= List of diplomatic visits to the United States from Europe =

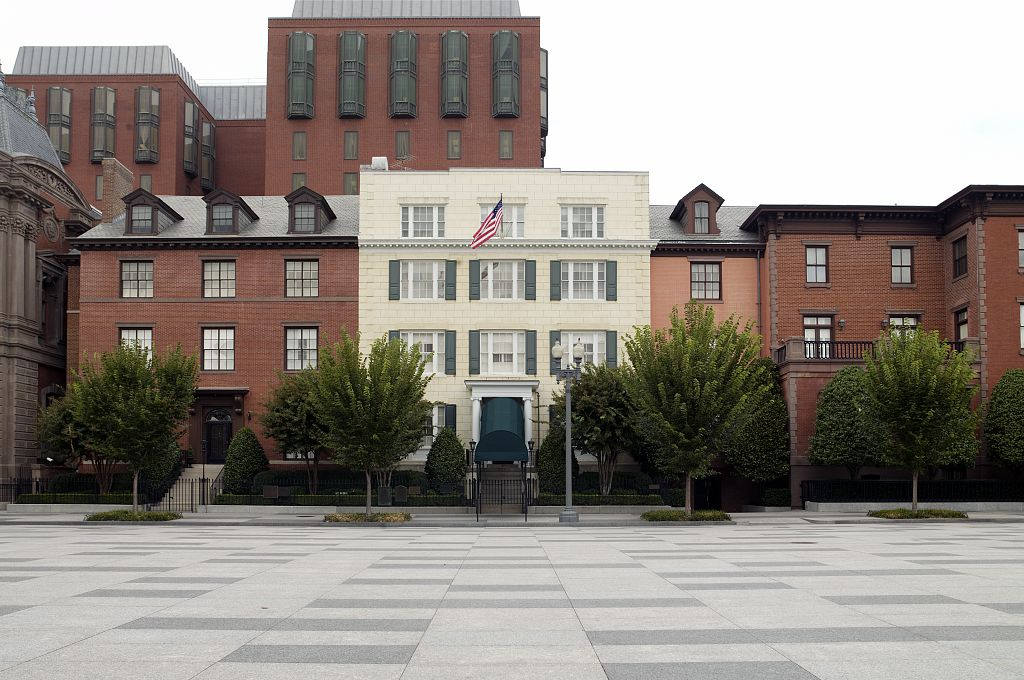
The President's Guest House, commonly known as Blair House has been the official guest house of visiting dignitaries in Washington D.C. since 1824

International trips made by the heads of state and heads of government to the United States have become a valuable part of American diplomacy and international relations since such trips were first made in the mid-19th century. They are complicated undertakings that often require months of planning along with a great deal of coordination and communication.

The first international visit to the United States was made by King Kalakaua of Hawaii in 1874, which was the first visit by a foreign chief of state or head of government.

The first European head of state to visit the United States was Prince Albert I of Monaco in 1913.

== Albania ==
Table of Trips
| Start | End | Guest | Title | Reason |
|---|---|---|---|---|
| June 14, 1992 | June 16, 1992 | Sali Berisha | President | Official working visit. |
| April 20, 1993 | April 22, 1993 | Aleksander Meksi | Prime Minister | Attended dedication of the Holocaust Memorial Museum and met with President Clinton on April 21. |
| September 10, 1995 | September 13, 1995 | Sali Berisha | President | Working visit. Afterwards visited Boston and New York. |
| February 3, 1998 | February 5, 1998 | Rexhep Meidani | President | Met with President Clinton during a private visit. |
| February 4, 1999 | | Pandeli Majko | Prime Minister | Met with President Clinton during a private visit. |
| April 23, 1999 | April 25, 1999 | Rexhep Meidani | President | Attended NATO's 50th Anniversary Summit. |
| May 1, 2001 | May 3, 2001 | Ilir Meta | Prime Minister | Met with President Bush May 1 during a private visit. |
| March 27, 2004 | April 1, 2004 | Fatos Nano | Prime Minister | Working visit. Attended NATO Accession ceremony. |
| May 20, 2012 | May 21, 2012 | Sali Berisha | Prime Minister | Attended the NATO Summit Meeting in Chicago, Illinois |
| September 21, 2012 | September 28, 2012 | Bujar Nishani | President | Attended the United Nations General Assembly. |
| September 21, 2013 | September 23, 2013 | Edi Rama | Prime Minister | Attended the United Nations General Assembly. |
| September 24, 2013 | September 28, 2013 | Bujar Nishani | President | Attended the United Nations General Assembly (accompanied by Prime Minister Edi Rama). |
| September 24, 2014 | September 26, 2014 | Bujar Nishani | President | Attended the United Nations General Assembly. |
| September 24, 2015 | September 29, 2015 | Edi Rama | Prime Minister | Attended the 2015 World Leadership Forum as well as the 2015 Columbia University World Leader Forum. |
| April 13, 2016 | April 14, 2016 | Edi Rama | Prime Minister | State visit. |
| September 23, 2016 | September 25, 2016 | Bujar Nishani | President | Attended the United Nations General Assembly. He also visited the city of Chicago in Illinois |
| September 18, 2017 | September 25, 2017 | Edi Rama | Prime Minister | Attended the United Nations General Assembly |
| September 28, 2018 | | Ilir Meta | President | Attended the United Nations General Assembly |
| July 9, 2024 | July 11, 2024 | Edi Rama | Prime Minister | Attended NATO 75th Anniversary Summit in Washington, D.C. |

== Armenia ==
Table of Trips
| Start | End | Guest | Title | Reason |
|---|---|---|---|---|
| August 7, 1994 | August 12, 1994 | Levon Ter-Petrosjan | President | Official working visit. |
| April 23, 1999 | April 26, 1999 | Levon Ter-Petrosjan | President | Attended NATO's 50th Anniversary Summit and discussed the Caucasus situation. |
| June 24, 2000 | June 29, 2000 | Levon Ter-Petrosjan | President | Working visit. |
| April 8, 2001 | April 9, 2001 | Levon Ter-Petrosjan | President | Met with President Bush April 9 during a private visit after peace talks in Key West, beginning April 3. |
| April 12, 2010 | April 13, 2010 | Serzh Sargsyan | President | Attended the Nuclear Security Summit. |
| March 31, 2016 | April 1, 2016 | Serzh Sargsyan | President | Attended the Nuclear Security Summit. |
| August 8, 2025 | August 9, 2025 | Nikol Pashinyan | Prime Minister | Met with U.S. President Donald Trump and Azeri President Ilham Aliyev to finally end the more than 35 Year long conflict between Armenia and Azerbaijan. |

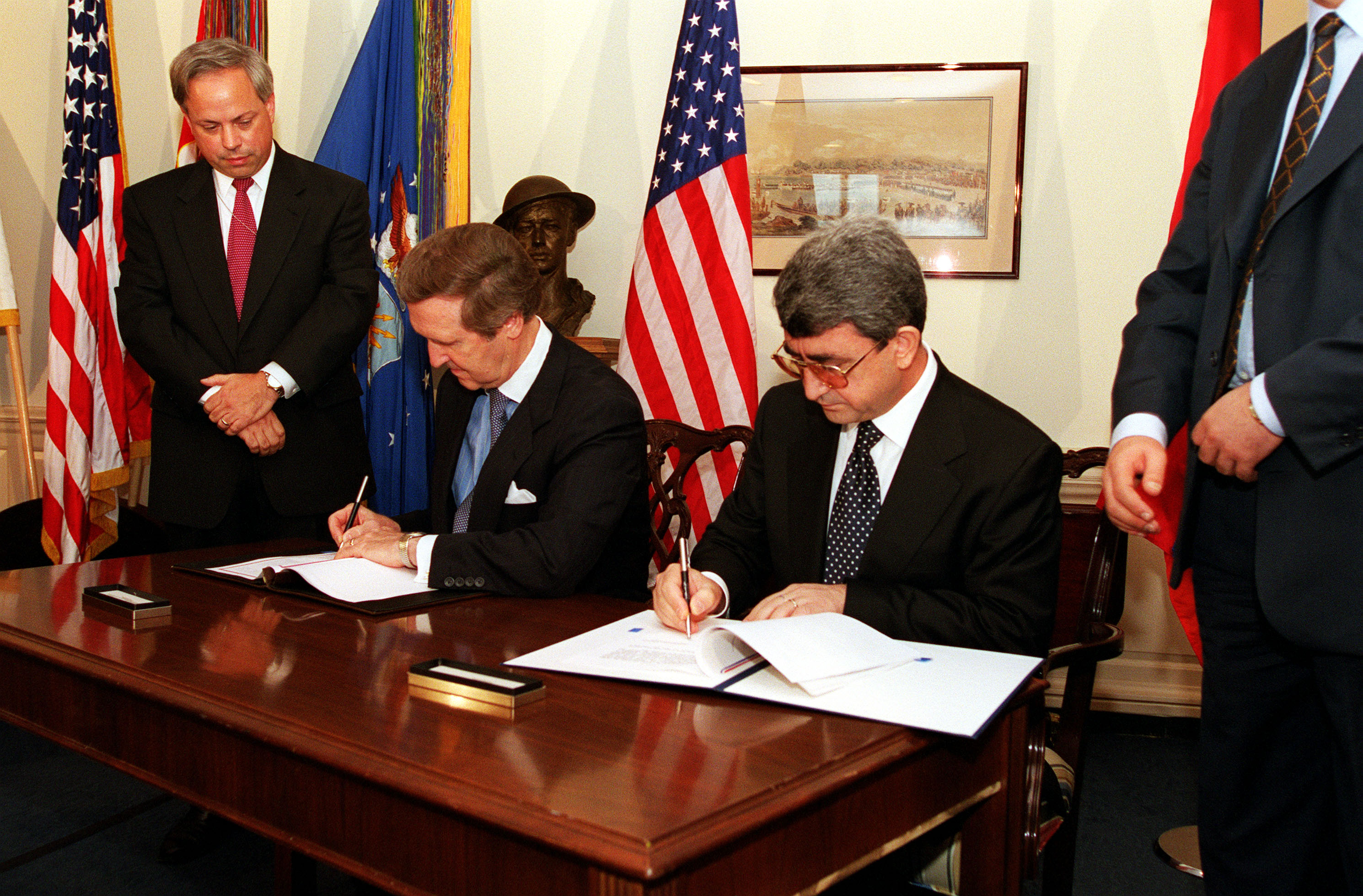

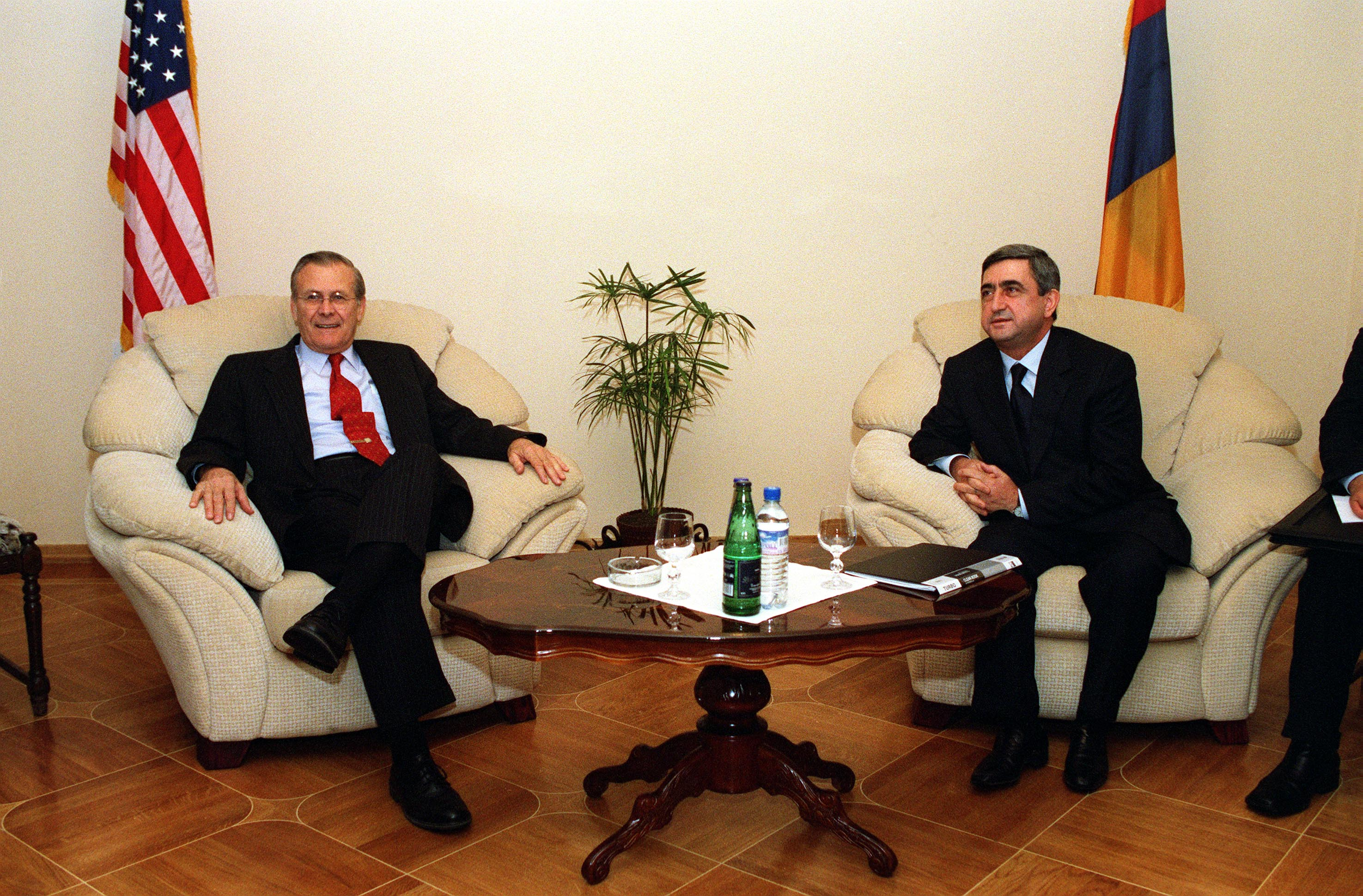

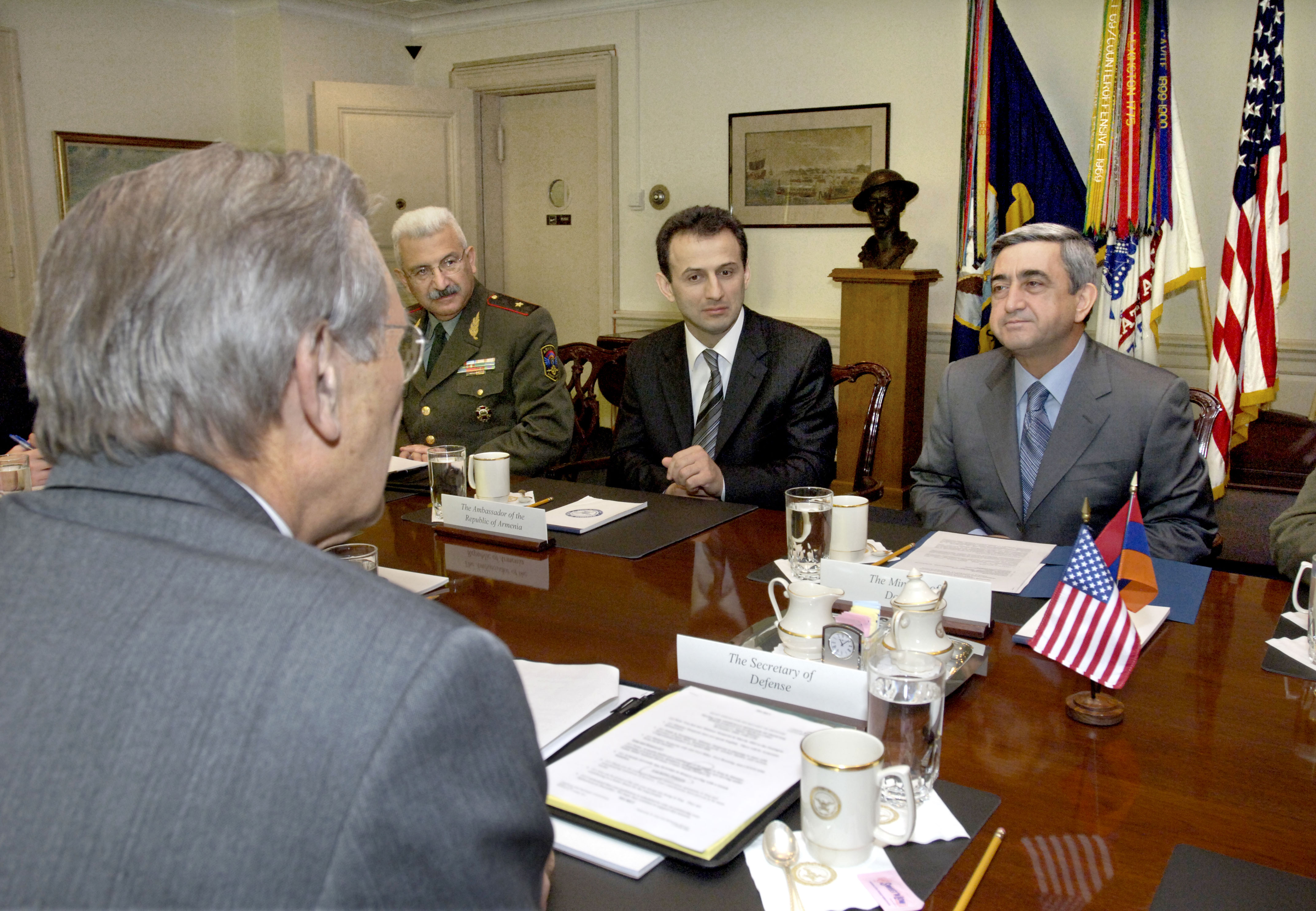

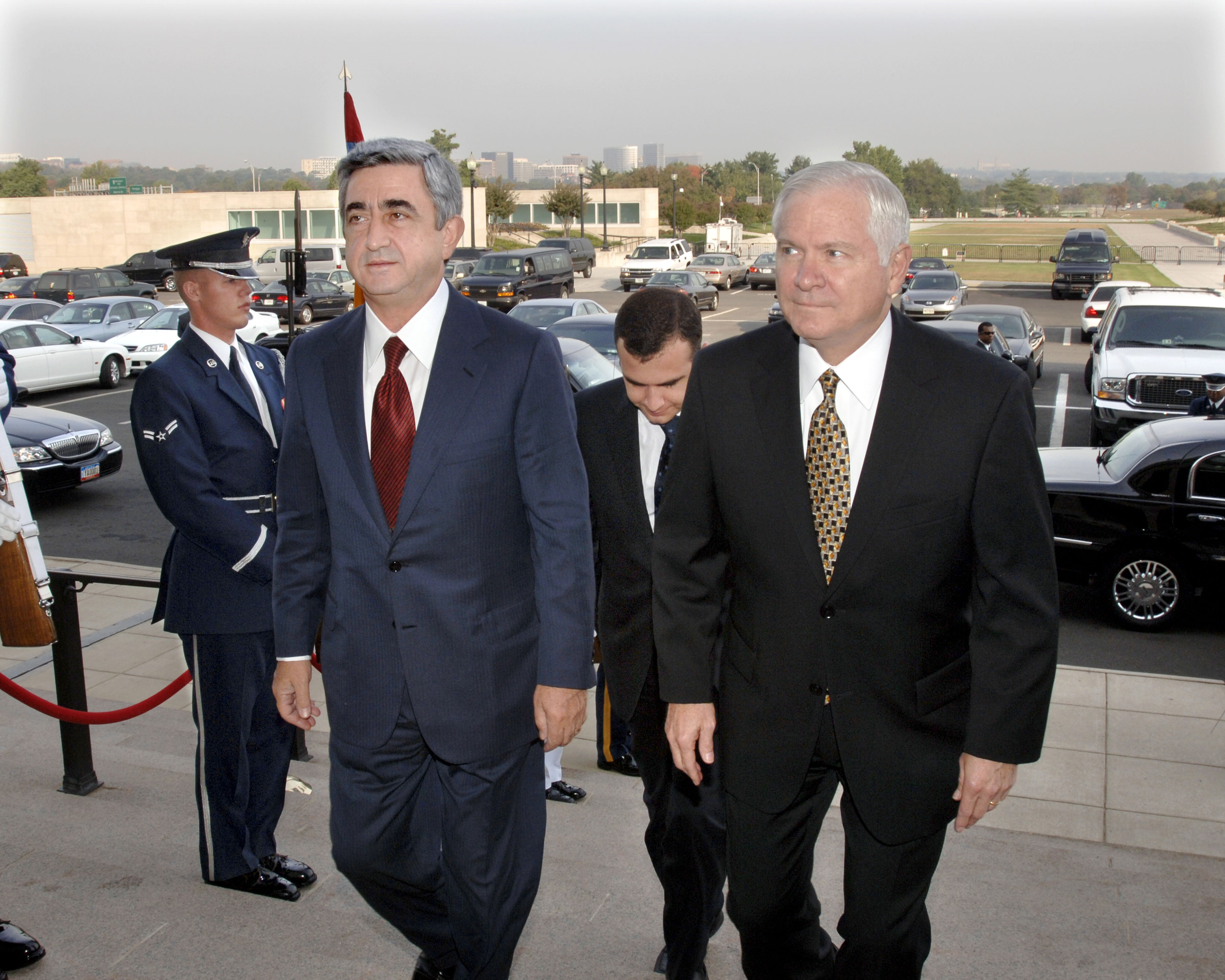

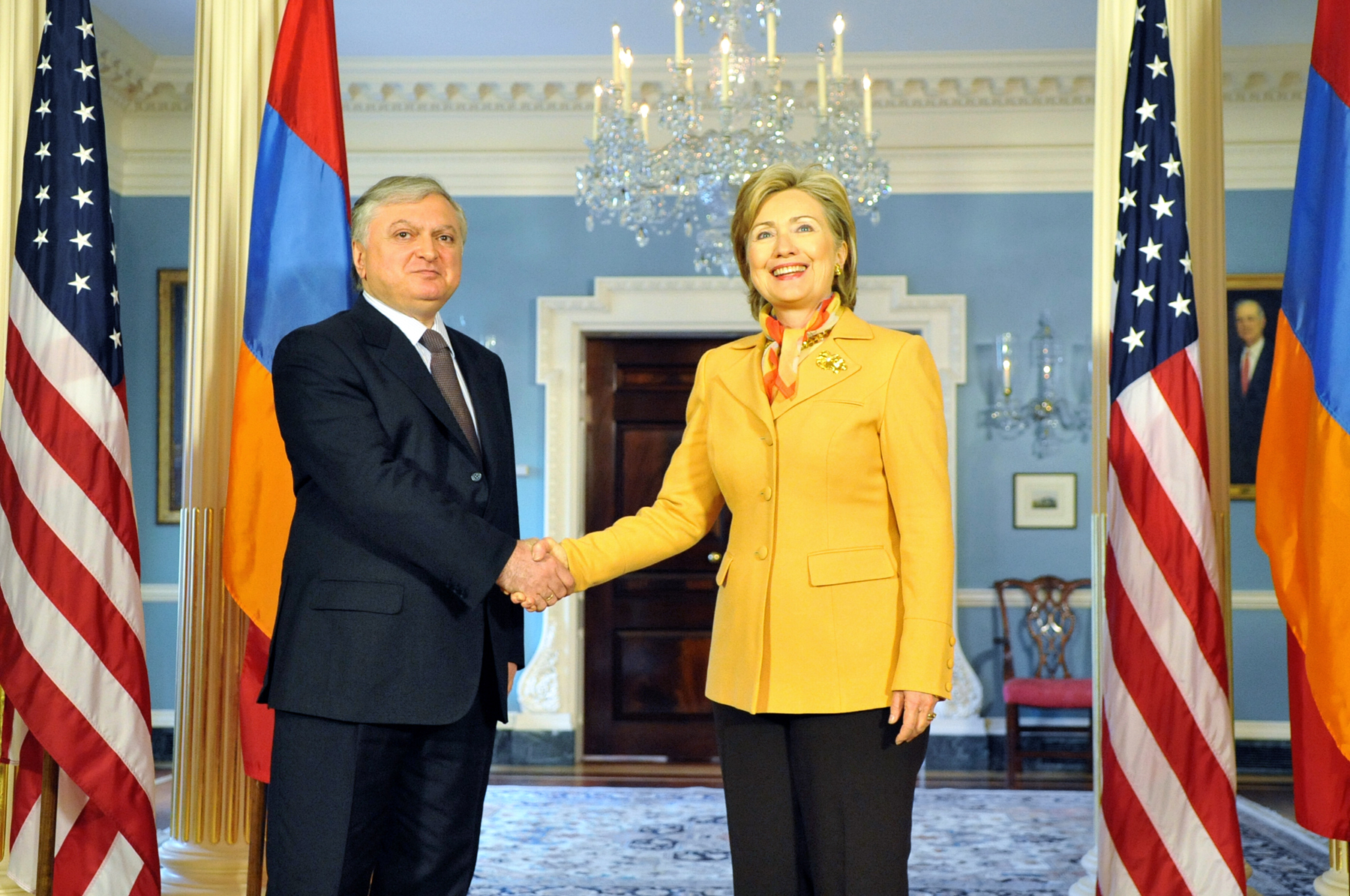

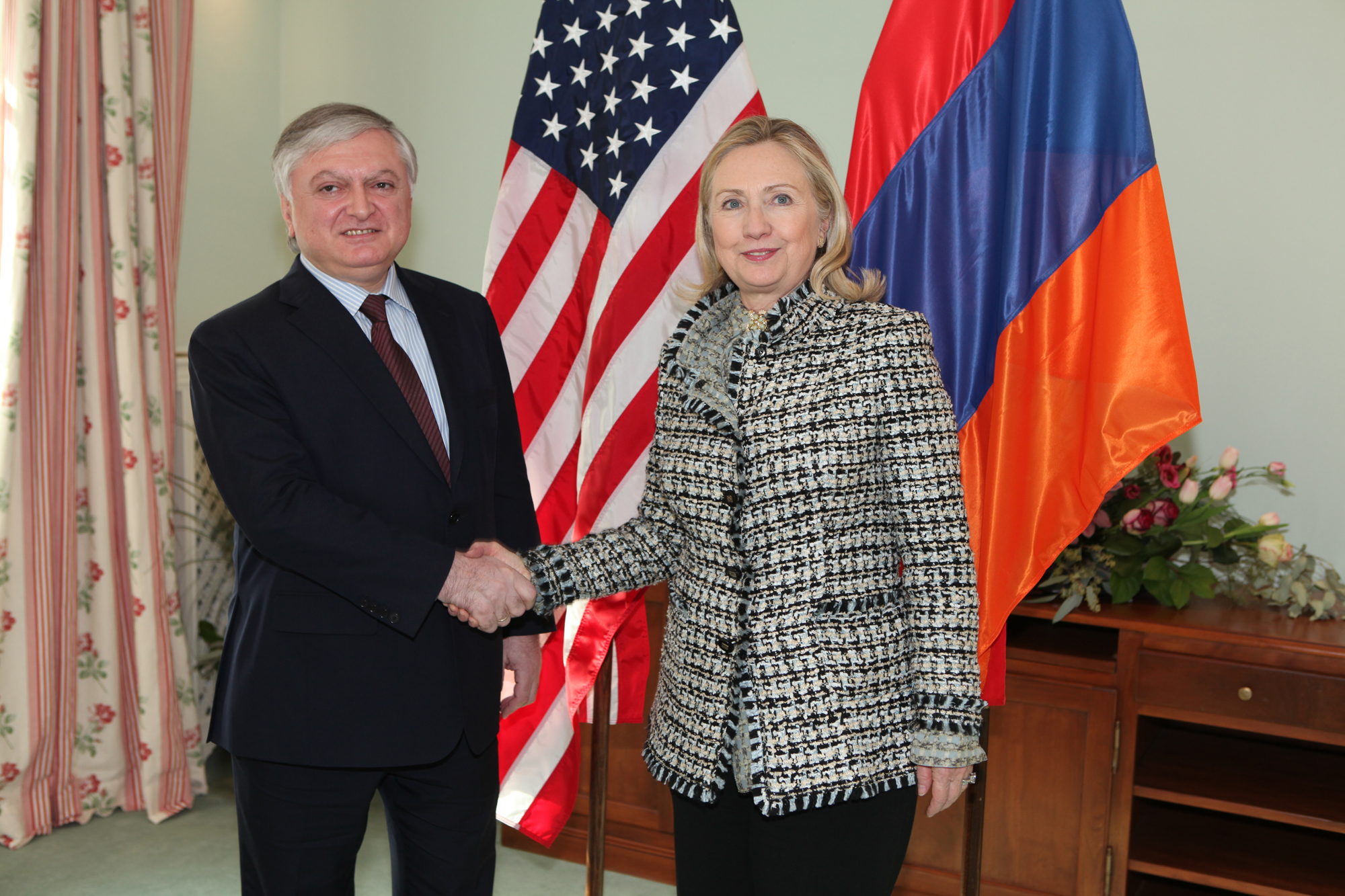

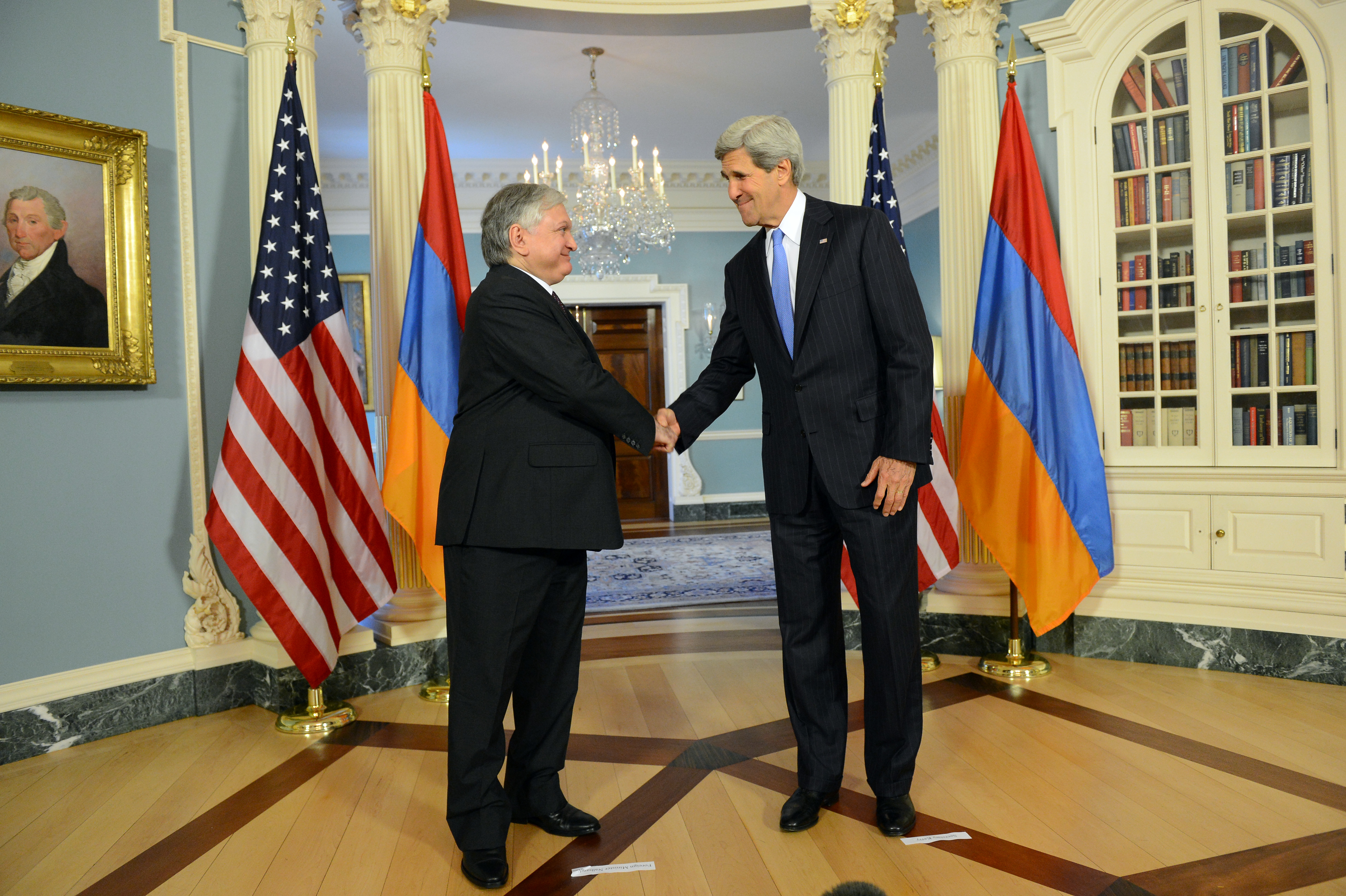

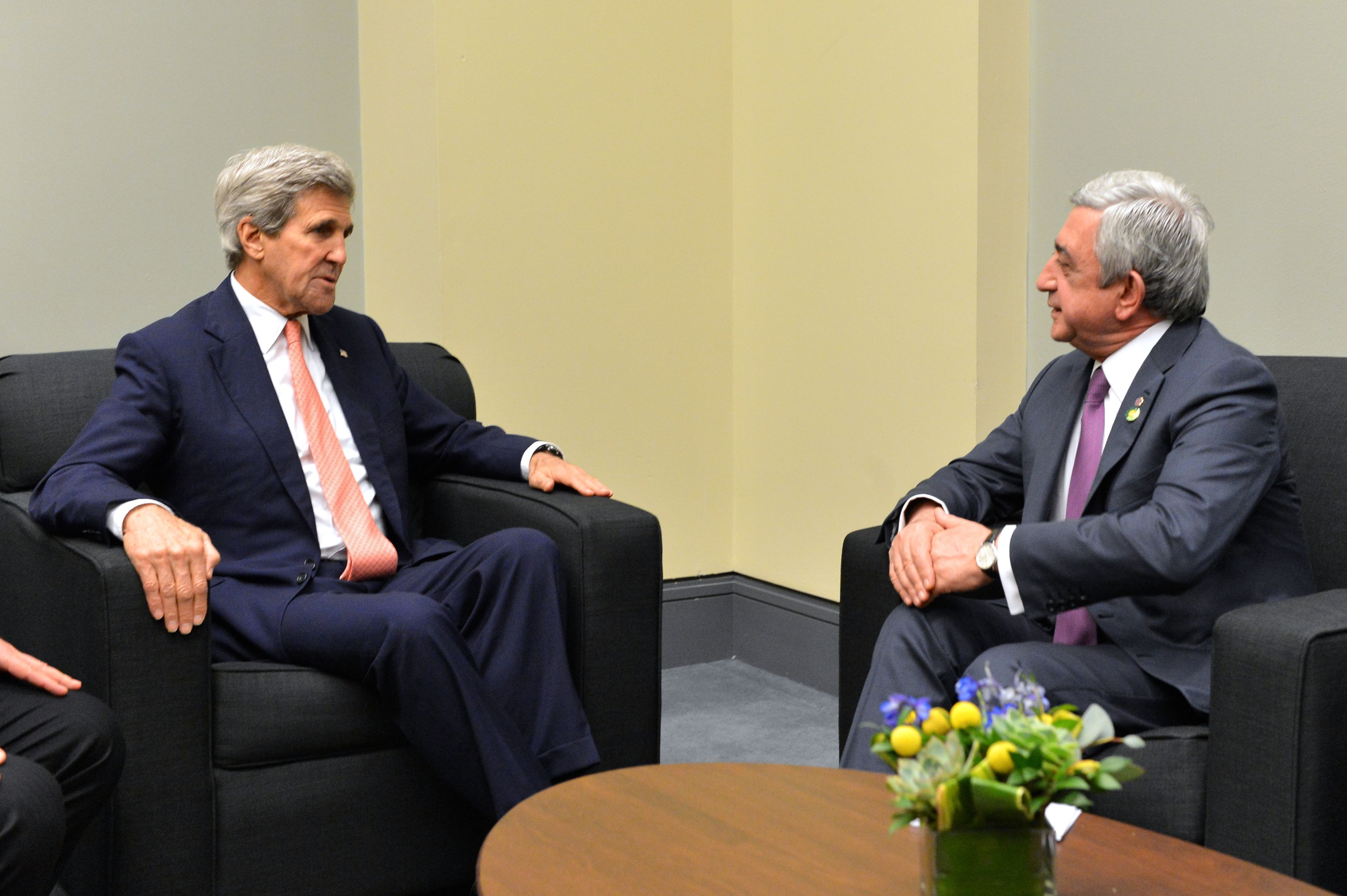

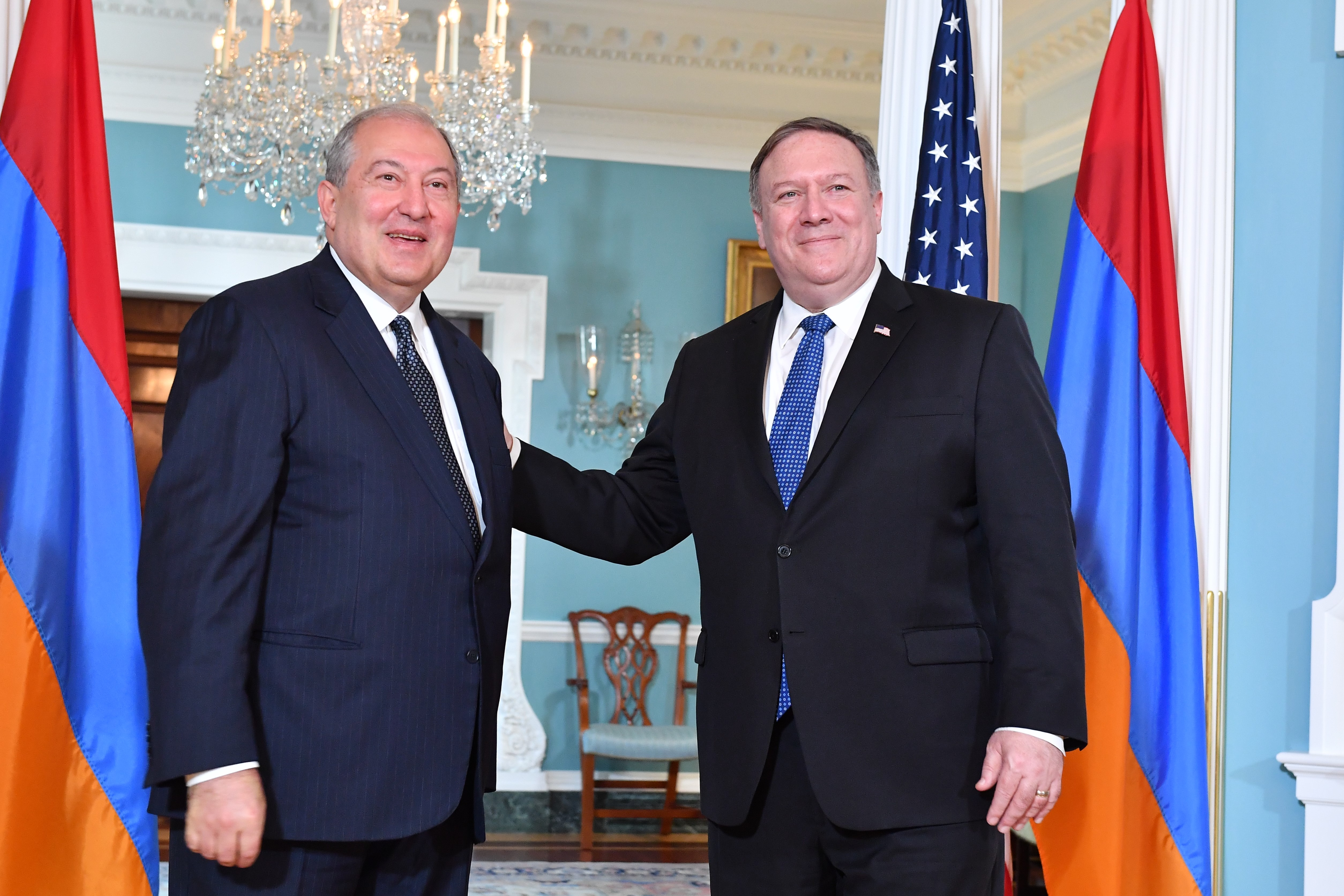

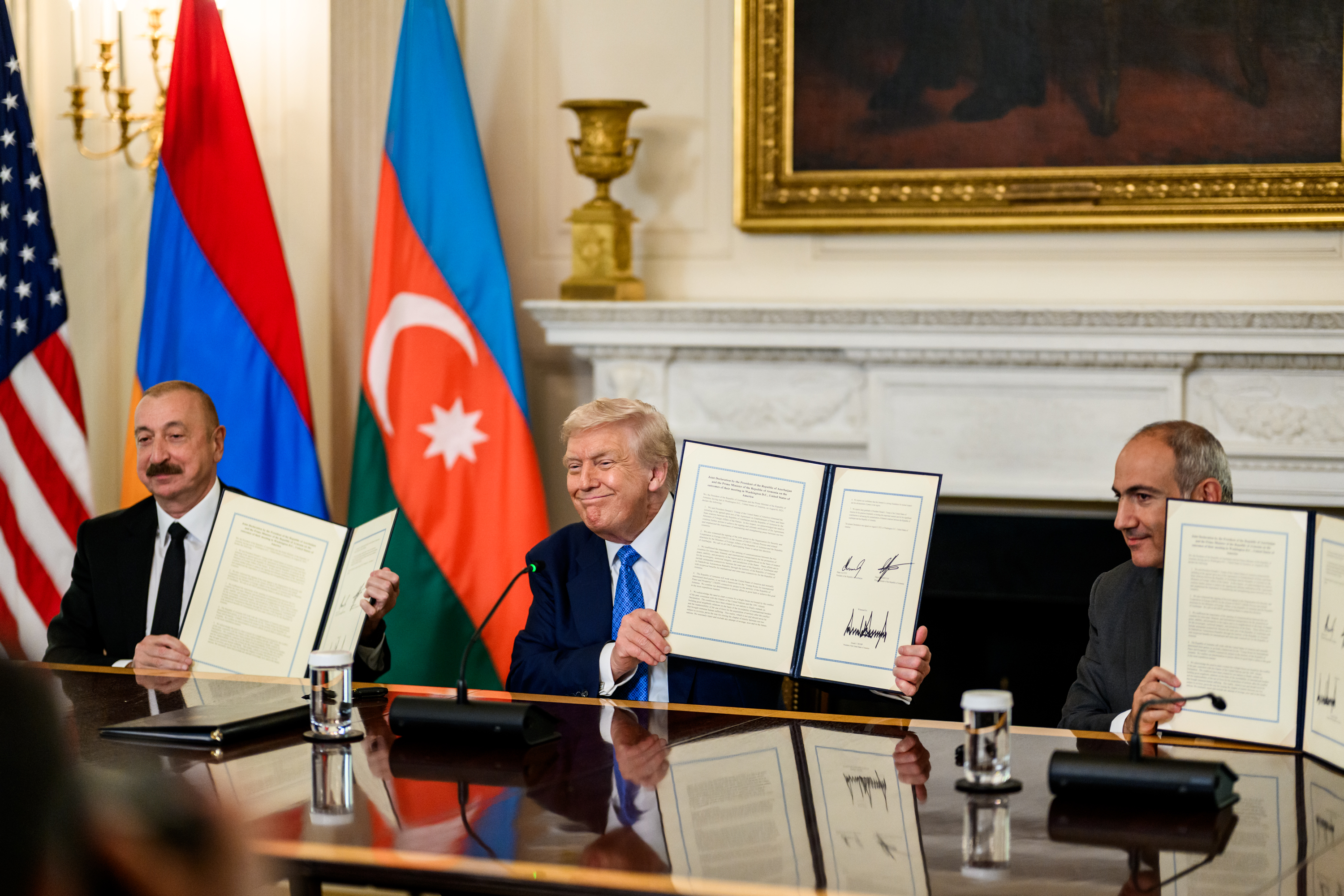

== Austria ==
Table of Trips
| Start | End | Guest | Title | Reason |
|---|---|---|---|---|
| May 12, 1952 | May 16, 1952 | Leopold Figl | Chancellor | At the invitation of the U.S. Government. In U.S. May 11–27. Visited New York City, Williamsburg, Buffalo, Detroit, Chicago, and Madison. |
| November 21, 1954 | November 25, 1954 | Julius Raab | Chancellor | Official visit. Afterwards visited Miami, New Orleans, St. Louis, and New York City. Departed U.S. December 5. Stopped in New York City December 9 after visiting Canada |
| May 18, 1958 | May 21, 1958 | Julius Raab | Chancellor | Unofficial visit. In U.S. May 17–28; visited New York City, Chicago, and San Francisco. |
| May 2, 1962 | May 4, 1962 | Alfons Gorbach | Chancellor | Informal visit. Afterwards visited New York City. Departed U.S. May 5. |
| November 24, 1963 | November 25, 1963 | Alfons Gorbach | Chancellor | Attended funeral of John. F Kennedy |
| April 10, 1968 | April 12, 1968 | Josef Klaus | Chancellor | Official visit. In U.S. April 6–17; visited New York City, Chicago, San Francisco, and Los Angeles. |
| November 12, 1974 | November 13, 1974 | Bruno Kreisky | Chancellor | Official visit. In U.S. November 9; visited New York City and Williamsburg. |
| March 14, 1977 | March 14, 1977 | Bruno Kreisky | Chancellor | Private visit. |
| October 26, 1979 | October 26, 1979 | Bruno Kreisky | Chancellor | Private visit. |
| February 2, 1983 | February 4, 1983 | Bruno Kreisky | Chancellor | Official working visit. Private visit afterwards to New York City. |
| February 27, 1984 | February 29, 1984 | Rudolf Kirchschläger | President | State visit; visited New York City, Chicago, San Francisco, and Los Angeles. Departed U.S. March 5. |
| May 20, 1987 | May 23, 1987 | Franz Vranitzky | Chancellor | Private Visit. Met with President Reagan May 21. |
| May 5, 1989 | May 5, 1989 | Franz Vranitzky | Chancellor | Met with President Bush during a private visit. |
| February 20, 1990 | February 20, 1990 | Franz Vranitzky | Chancellor | Private visit. |
| October 10, 1991 | October 10, 1991 | Franz Vranitzky | Chancellor | Met with President Bush during a private visit. |
| January 30, 1992 | January 30, 1992 | Franz Vranitzky | Chancellor | Met with President Bush while attending a U.N. Security Council Summit in New York City. |
| April 20, 1994 | April 20, 1994 | Franz Vranitzky | Chancellor | Met with President Clinton during a private visit. |
| October 18, 1995 | October 20, 1995 | Thomas Klestil | President | Working visit. |
| December 18, 1998 | December 18, 1998 | Viktor Klima | Chancellor | Attended U.S.-EU Summit meeting. Private visit with President Clinton. |
| April 23, 1999 | April 25, 1999 | Viktor Klima | Chancellor | Attended NATO's 50th Anniversary Summit. |
| October 30, 2001 | November 1, 2001 | Wolfgang Schüssel | Chancellor | Working visit. |
| December 8, 2005 | December 8, 2005 | Wolfgang Schüssel | Chancellor | Working visit. |
| May 20, 2012 | May 21, 2012 | Werner Faymann | Chancellor | Attended the NATO Summit meeting in Chicago |
| February 19, 2019 | February 21, 2019 | Sebastian Kurz | Chancellor | Working visit. |

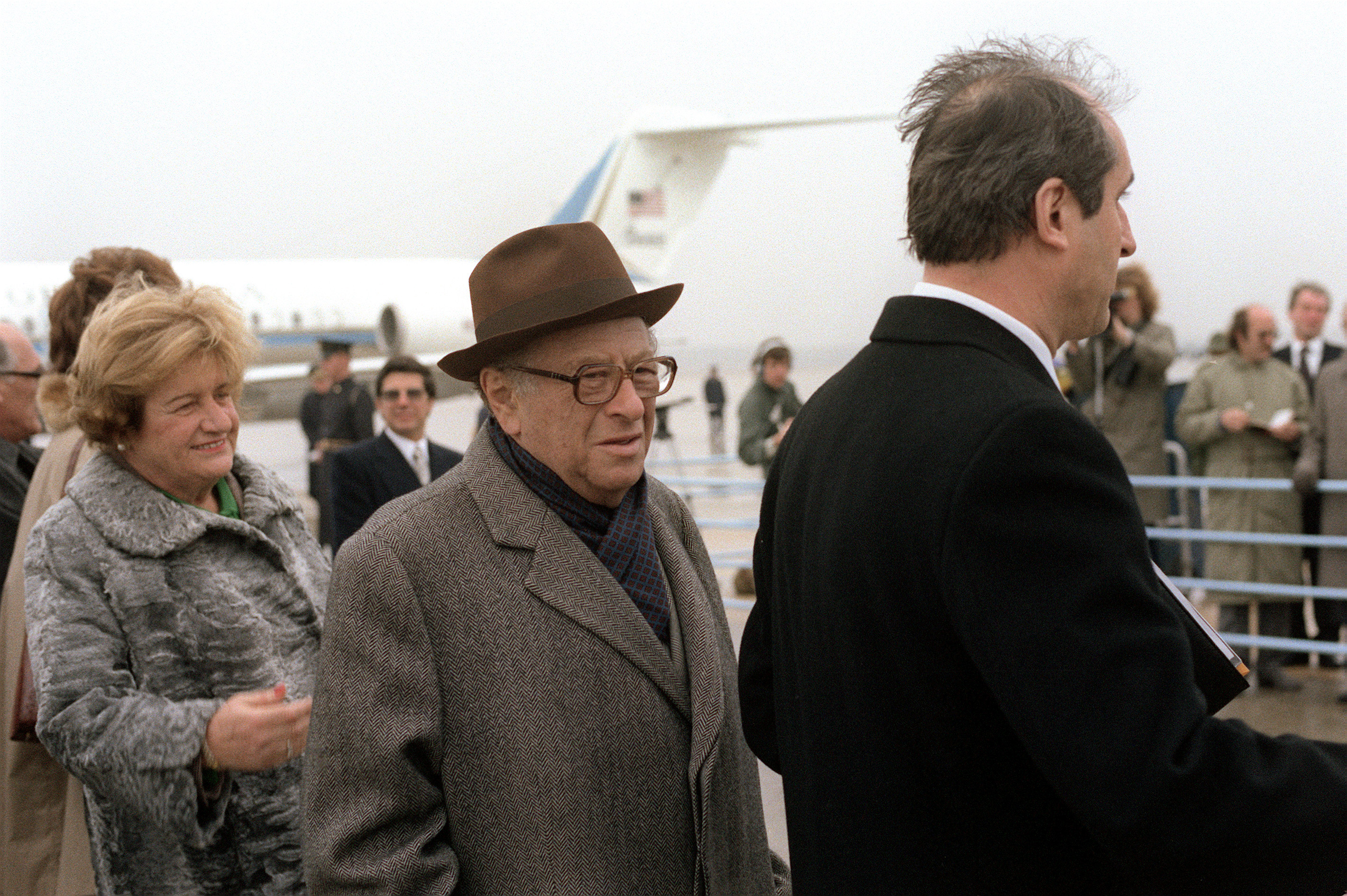

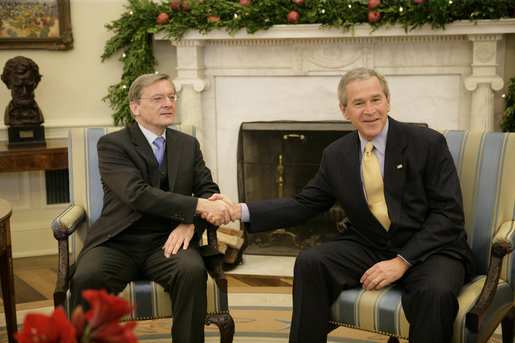

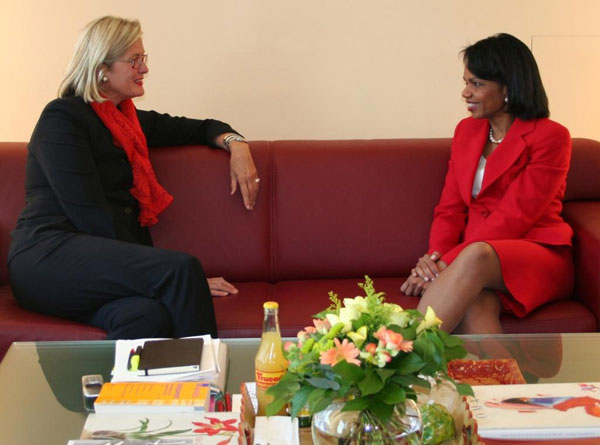

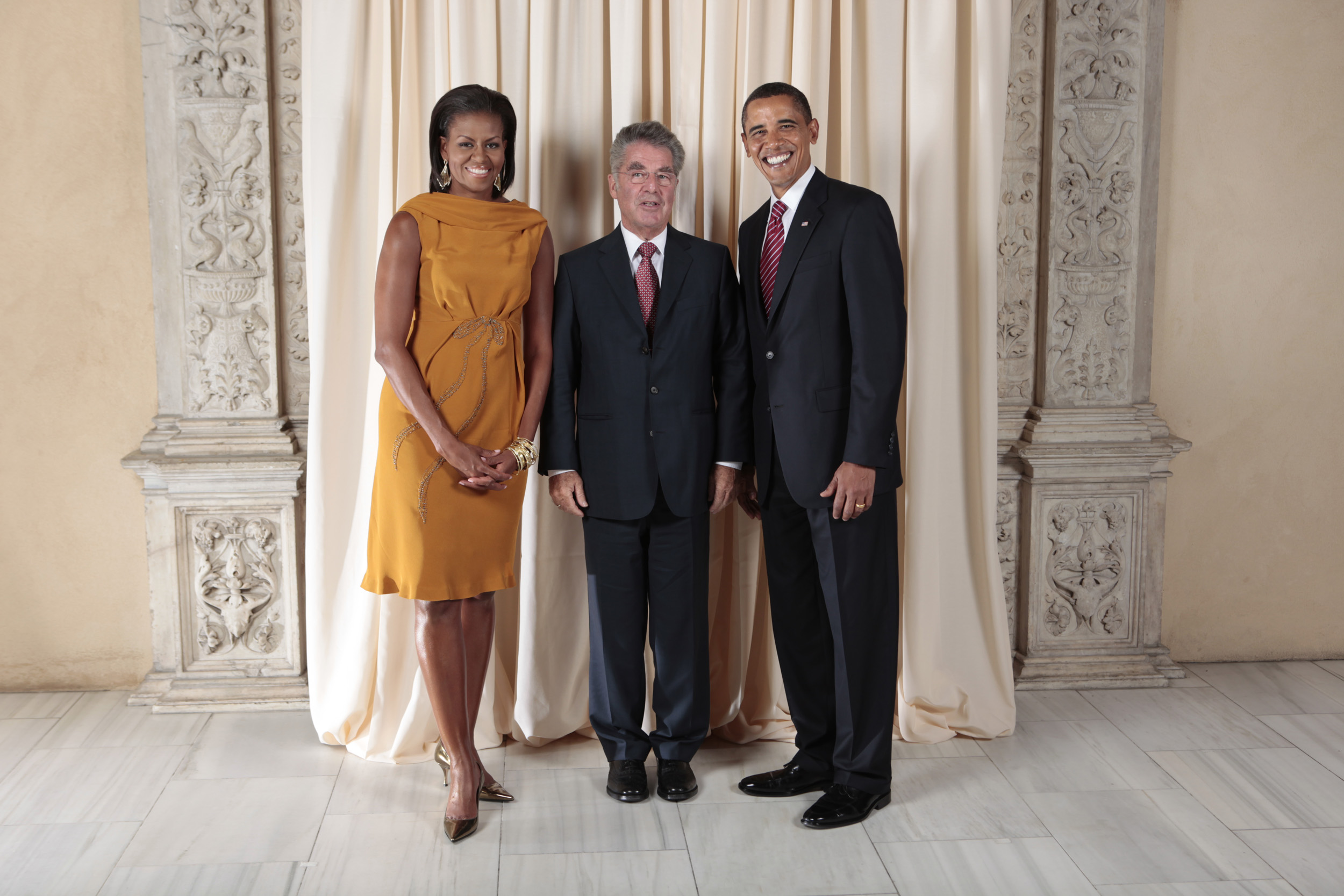

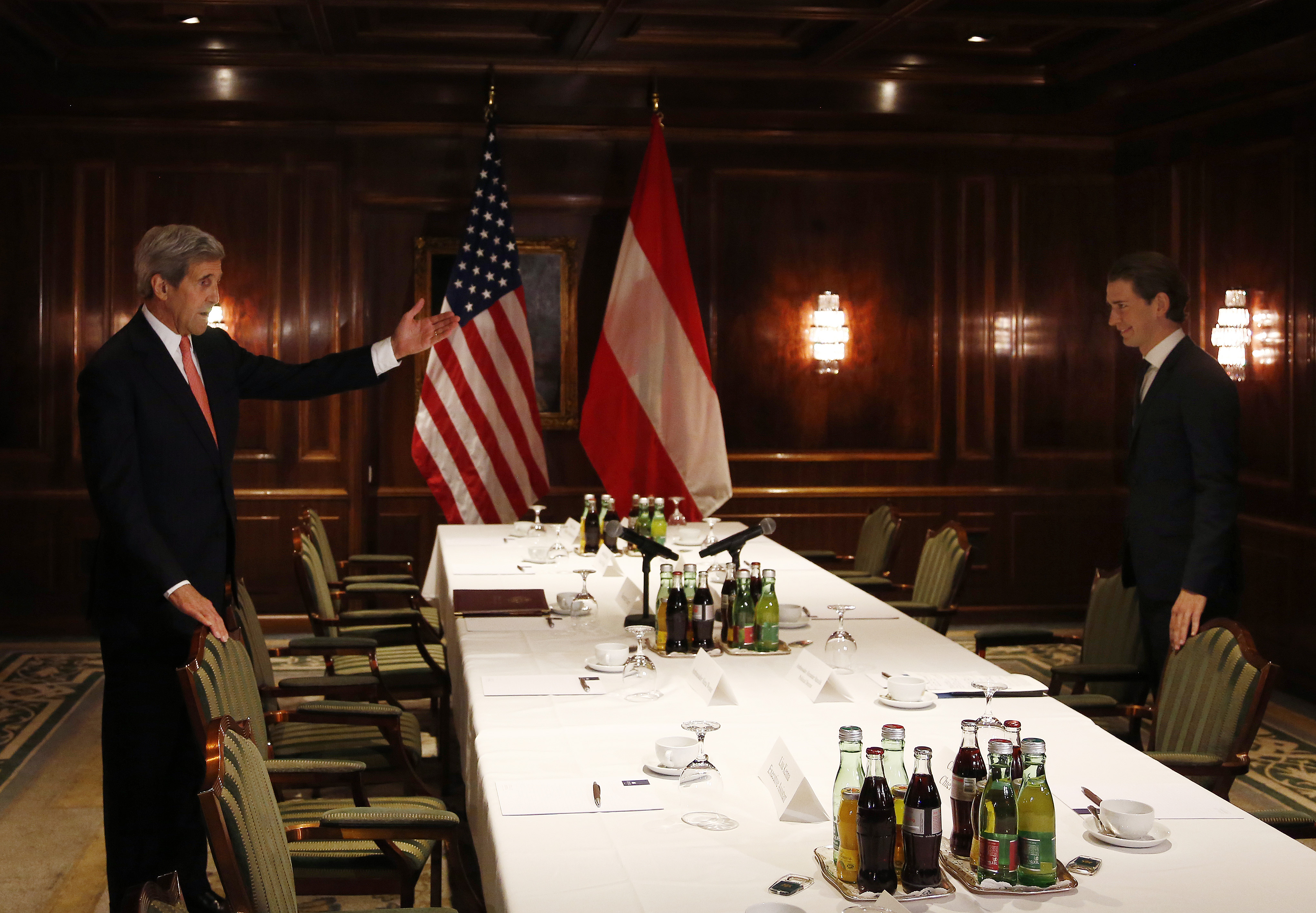

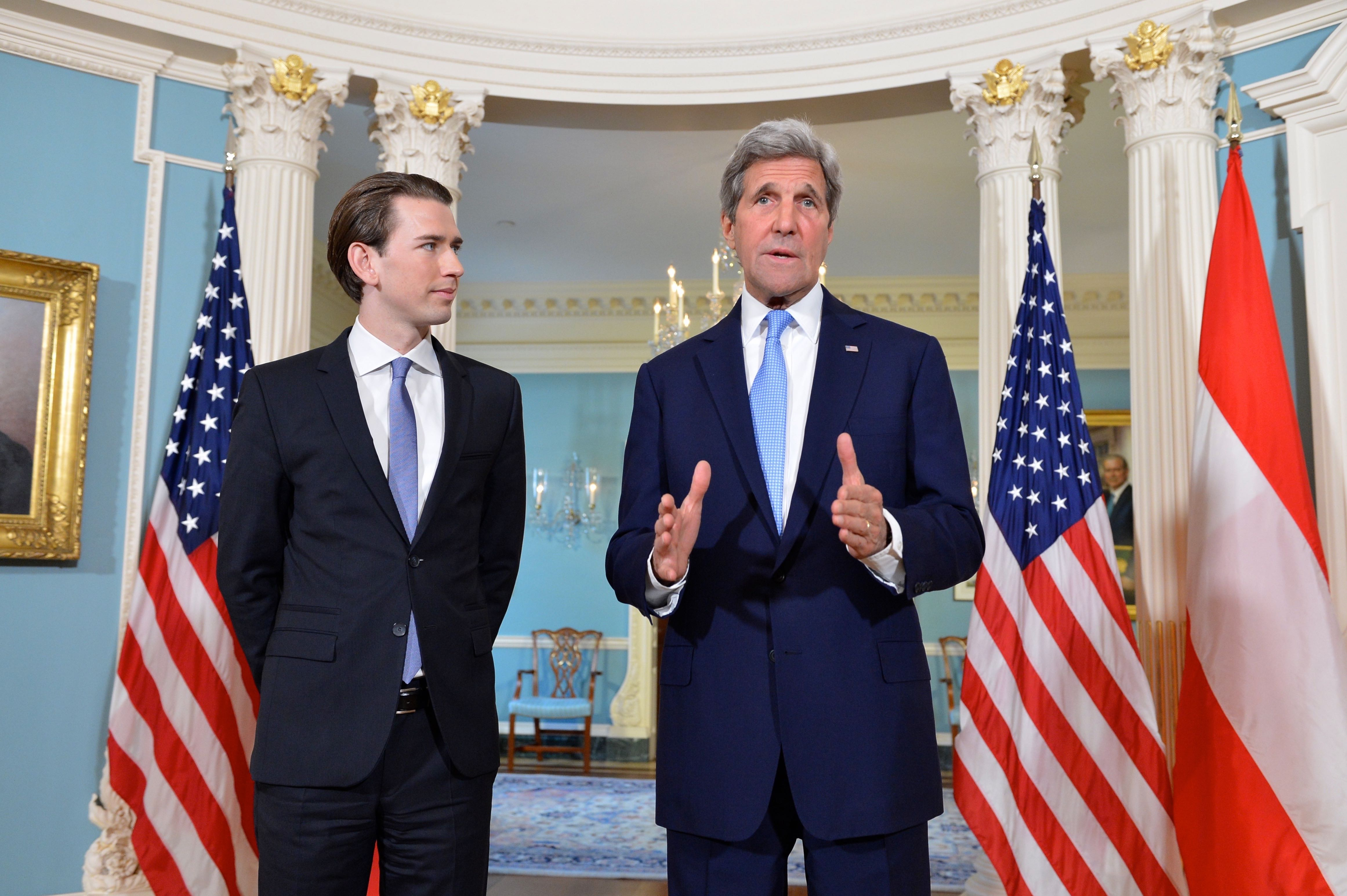

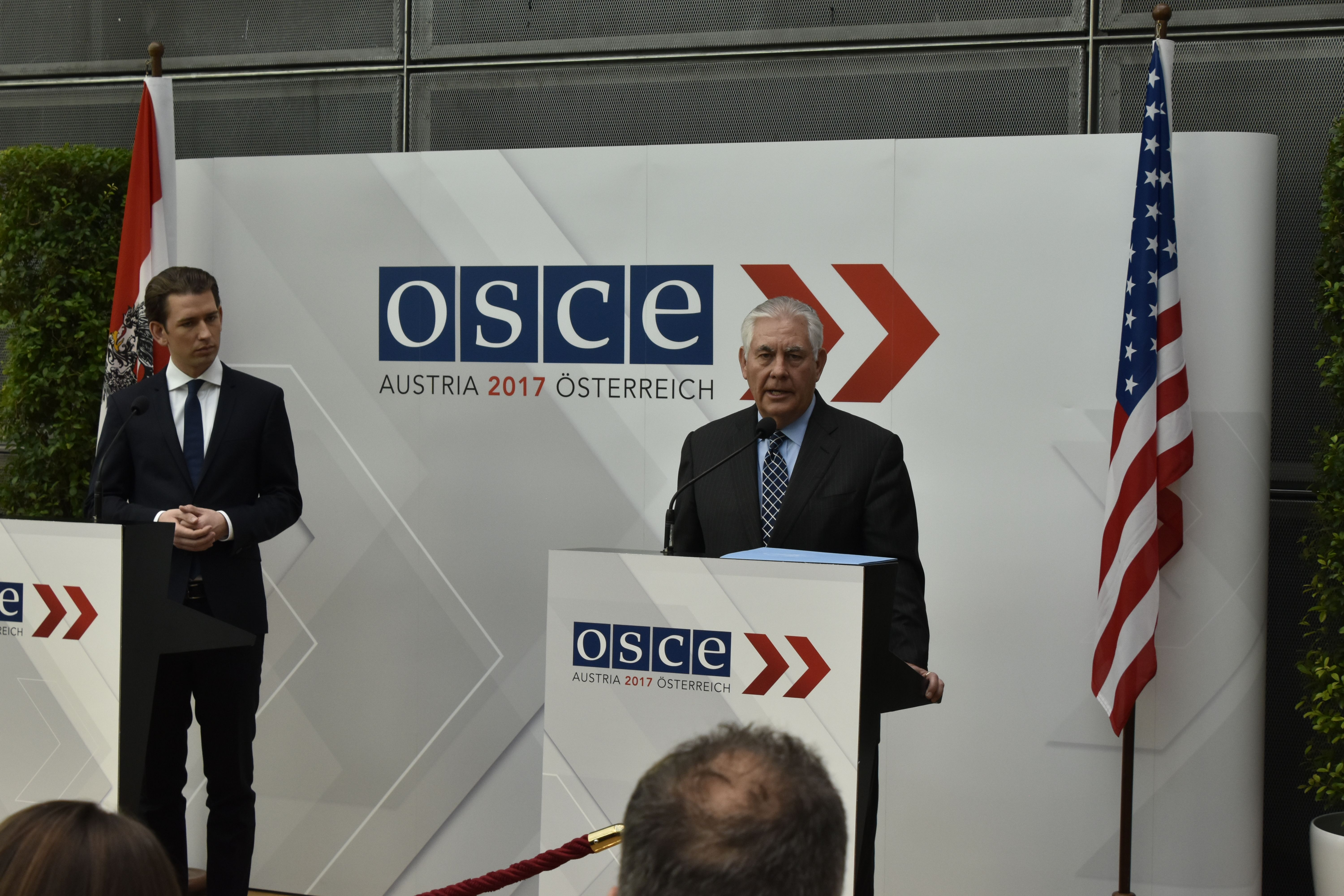

== Azerbaijan ==
Table of Trips
| Start | End | Guest | Title | Reason |
|---|---|---|---|---|
| September 26, 1994 | September 26, 1994 | Heydar Aliyev | President | Met with President Clinton at the U.N. General Assembly. |
| July 29, 1997 | August 1, 1997 | Heydar Aliyev | President | Official working visit. Later visited New York City, Houston, and Chicago. Departed the U.S. August 6. |
| April 23, 1999 | April 26, 1999 | Heydar Aliyev | President | Attended NATO's 50th Anniversary Summit and discussed the Caucasus situation. |
| July 12, 2000 | July 21, 2000 | Heydar Aliyev | President | Met with President Clinton during a private visit. |
| April 7, 2001 | April 11, 2001 | Heydar Aliyev | President | Met with President Bush April 9 during a private visit after peace talks in Key West, beginning April 3. |
| February 23, 2003 | February 27, 2003 | Heydar Aliyev | President | Working visit. |
| April 25, 2006 | April 28, 2006 | Ilham Aliyev | President | Working visit. |
| September 24, 2010 | September 24, 2010 | Ilham Aliyev | President | Met with President Obama at the U.N. General Assembly in New York City. |
| May 20, 2012 | May 21, 2012 | Ilham Aliyev | President | Attended the NATO Summit meeting in Chicago. |
| March 31, 2016 | April 1, 2016 | Ilham Aliyev | President | Attended the Nuclear Security Summit. |
| August 8, 2025 | August 9, 2025 | Ilham Aliyev | President | Met with U.S. President Donald Trump and Armenian Prime Minister Nikol Pashinyan to finally end the more than 35 Year long conflict between Armenia and Azerbaijan. |

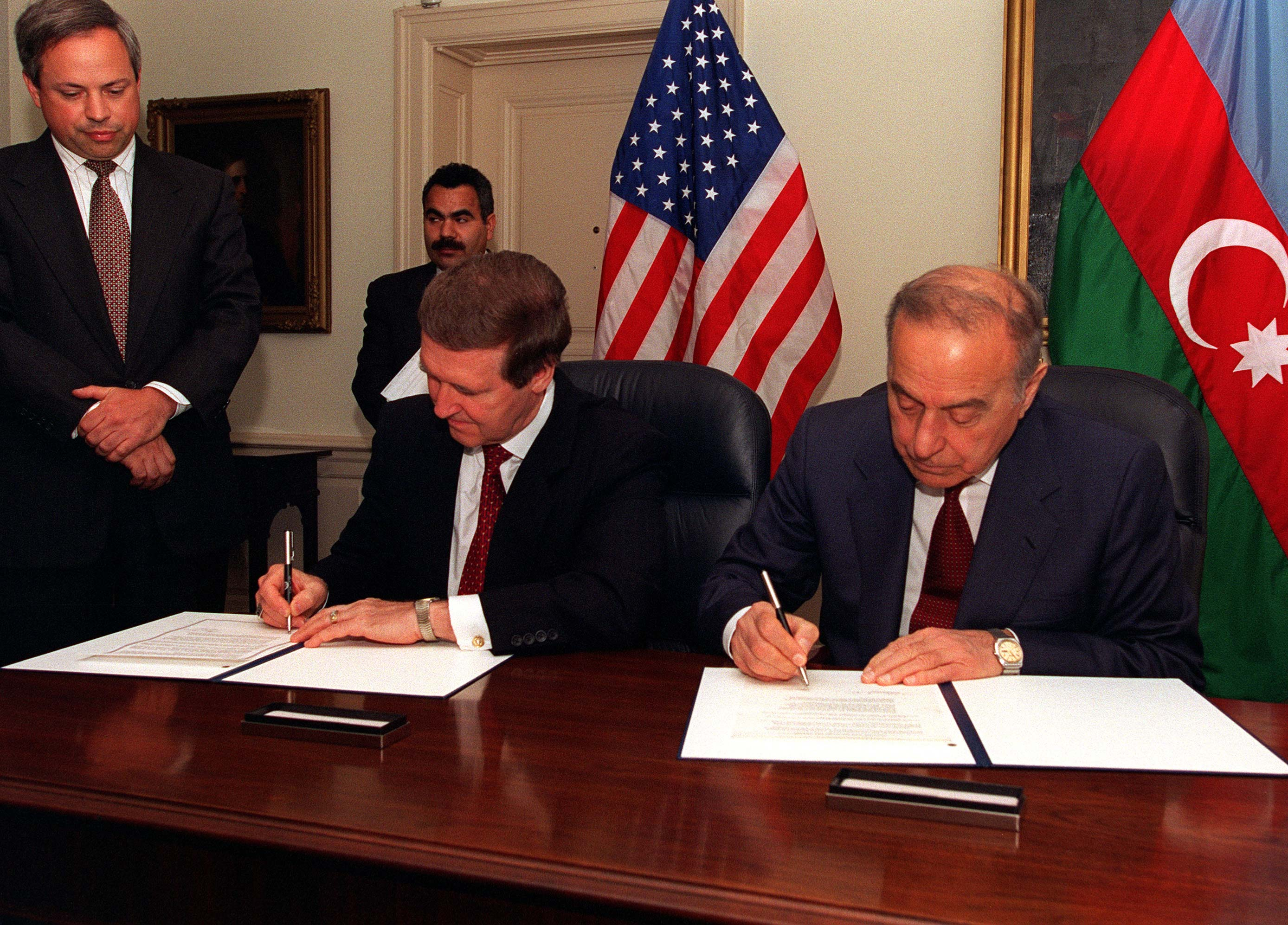

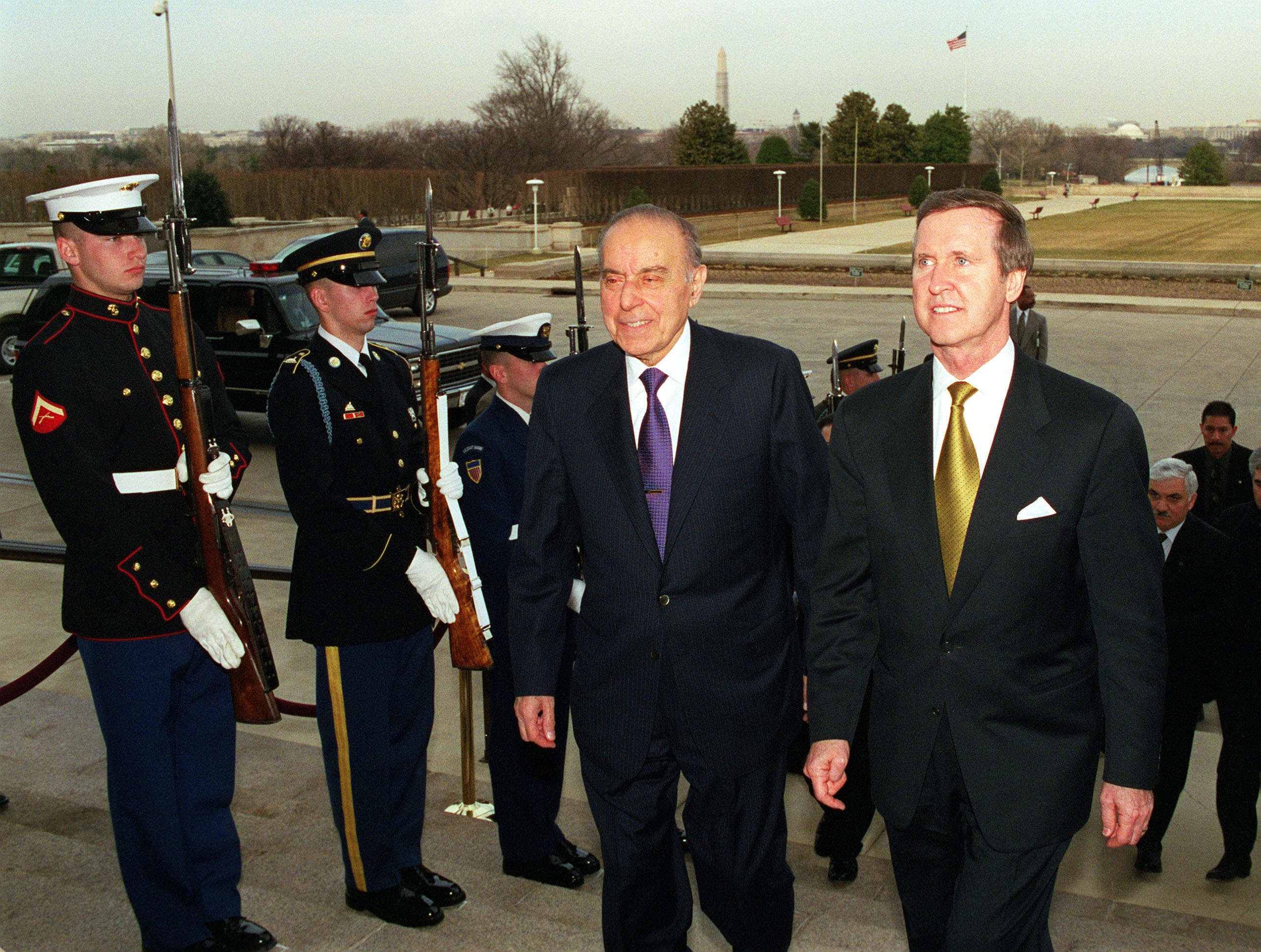

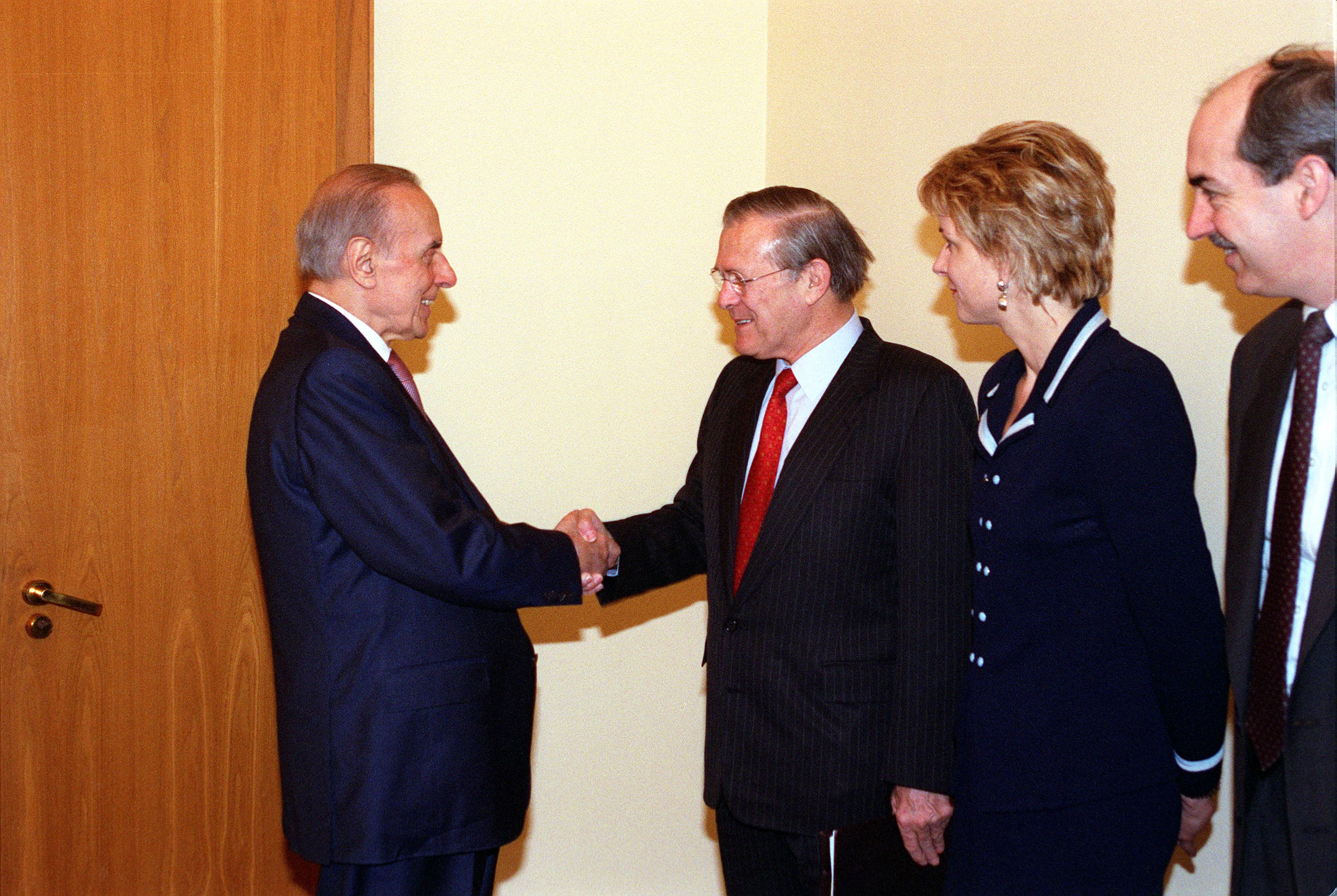

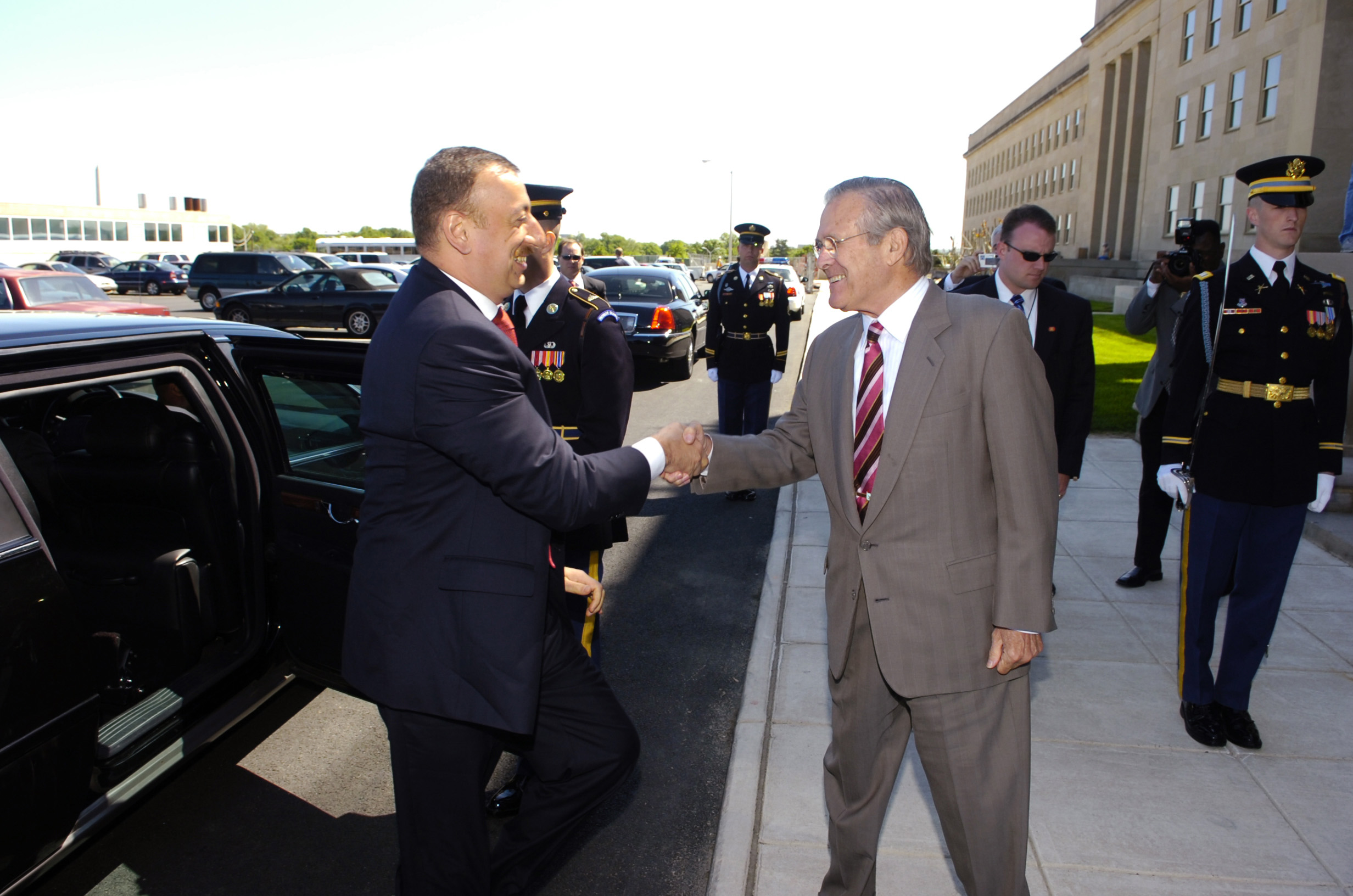

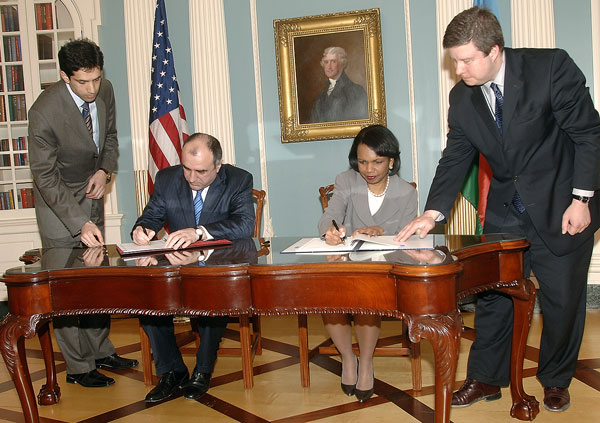

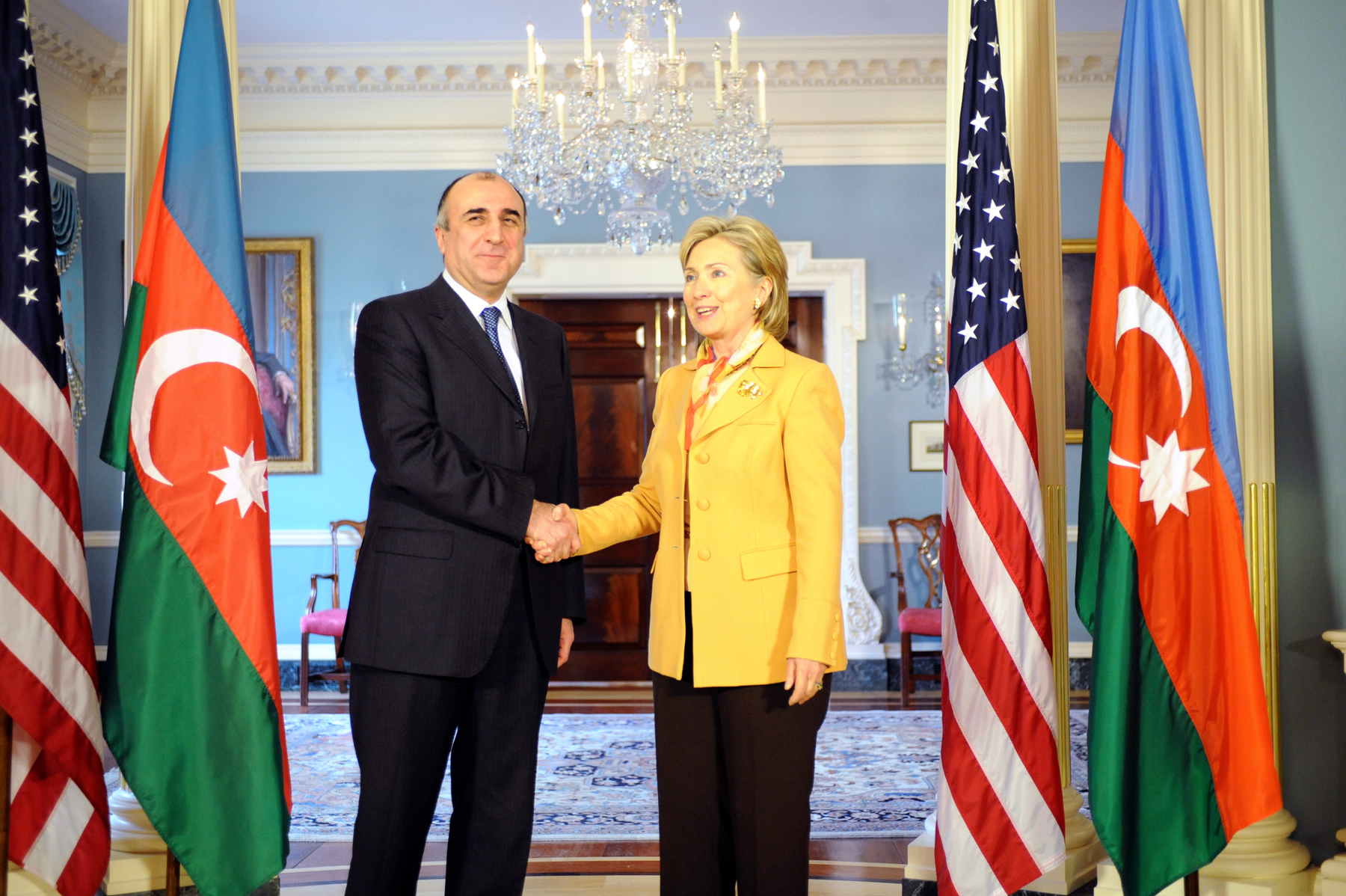

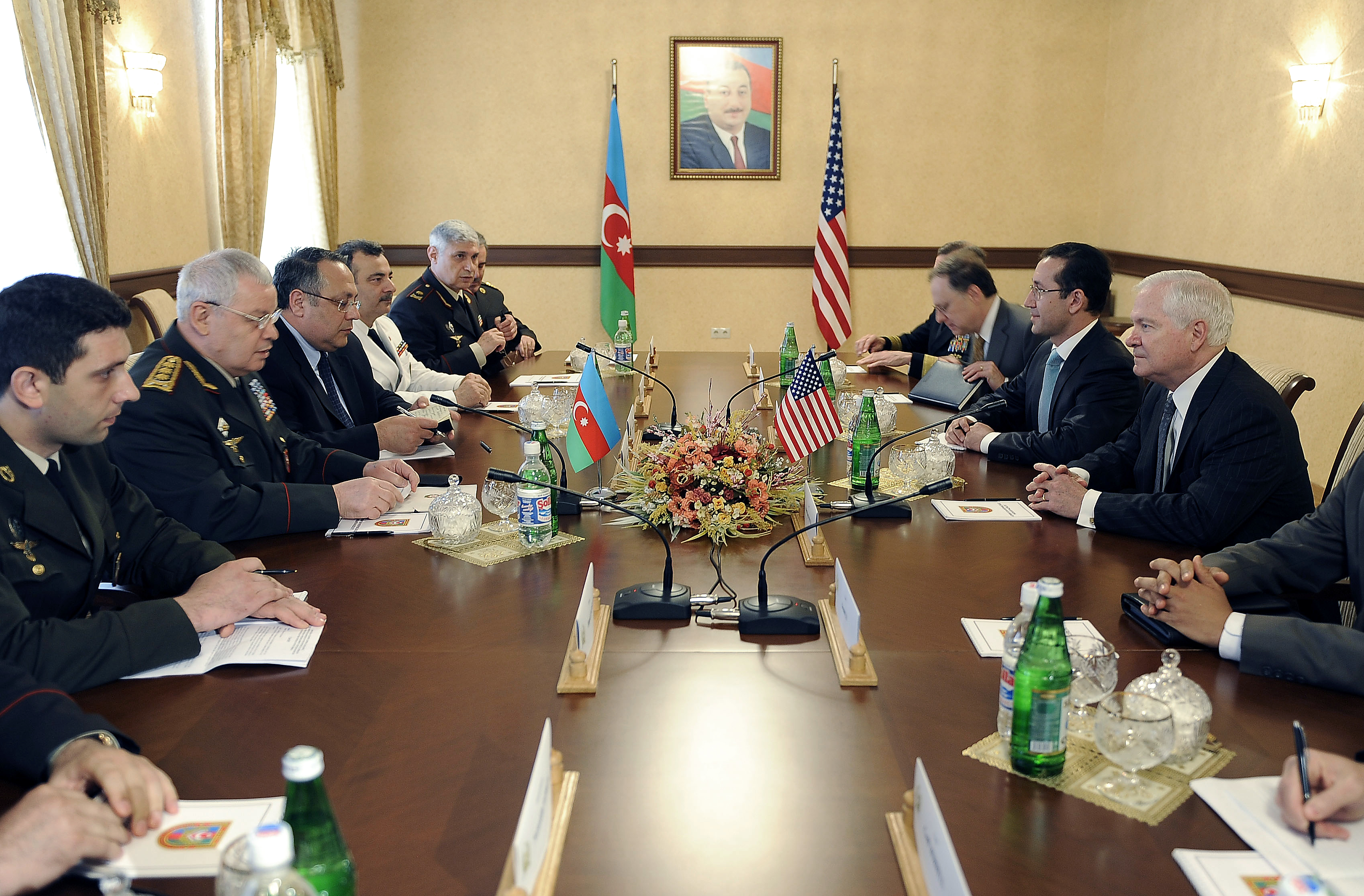

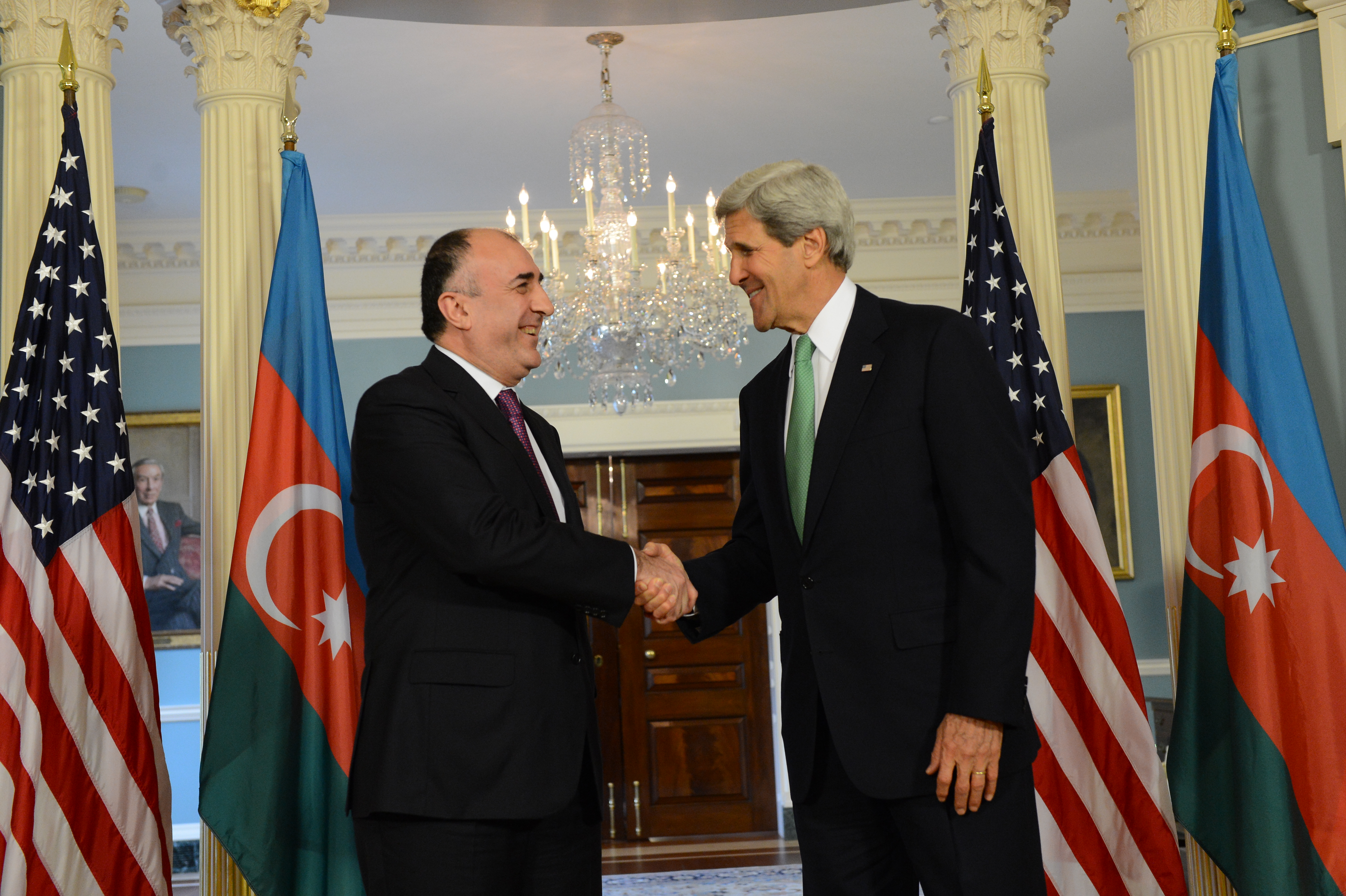

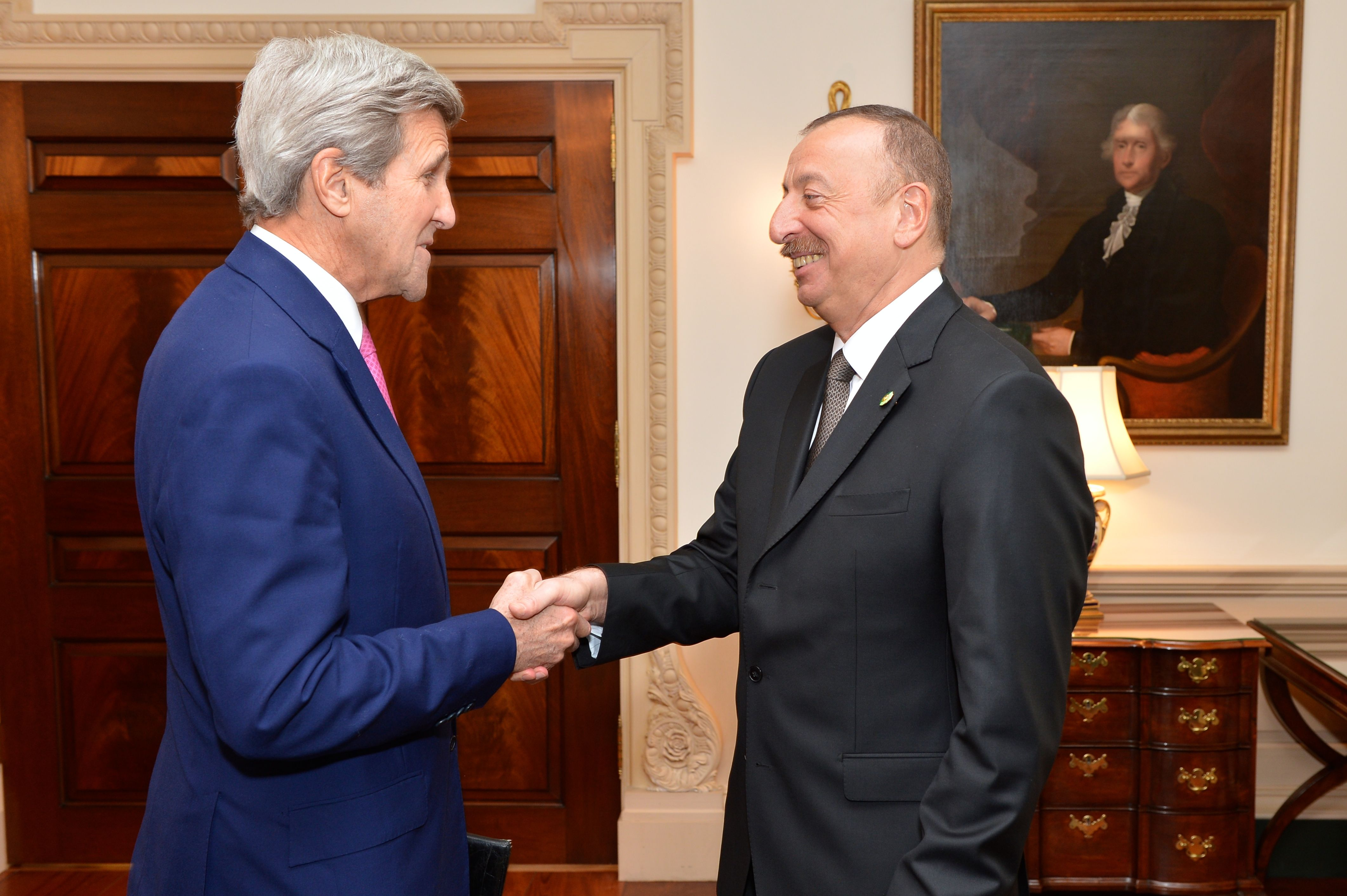

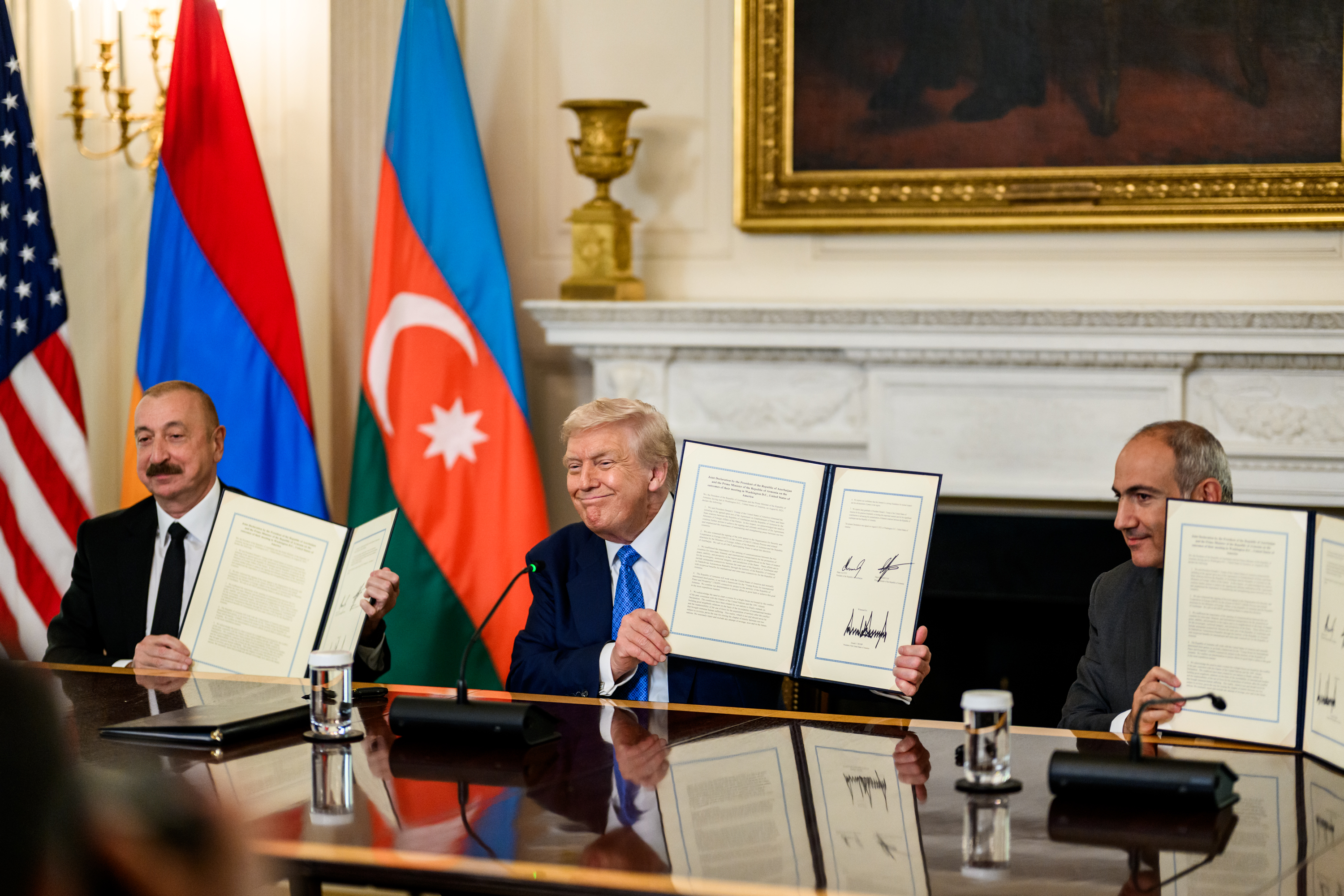

== Belarus ==
Table of Trips
| Start | End | Guest | Title | Reason |
|---|---|---|---|---|
| June 21, 1993 | June 23, 1993 | Stanislav Shushkevich | Chairman | Met with President Clinton during a private visit. |

== Belgium ==
Table of Trips
| Start | End | Guest | Title | Reason |
|---|---|---|---|---|
| October 27, 1919 | October 30, 1919 | Albert I | King | In U.S. October 2–31, visiting New York City, Boston, Santa Barbara, San Francisco, and Los Angeles. Addressed U.S. Congress October 28. |
| July 23, 1937 | July 25, 1937 | Paul van Zeeland | Prime Minister | In U.S. June 18–30. Also visited New York City and Princeton |
| April 4, 1948 | April 9, 1948 | Prince Charles | Regent | Also visited Annapolis, Knoxville, New York City, and West Point. Revisited Washington, D.C. privately April 10–12. Departed U.S. April 14. |
| April 4, 1948 | April 9, 1948 | Paul-Henri Spaak | Prime Minister | Accompanied Prince Charles. |
| April 2, 1951 | April 10, 1951 | Joseph Pholien | Prime Minister | Met with President Truman April 9 during a private visit. Arrived in U.S. March 31; visited New York City. |
| 11.–May 14, 1959 | 11.–May 14, 1959 | Baudouin I | King | State visit. Addressed U.S. Congress May 12. Afterwards visited Detroit, Chicago, Dallas and El Paso, Los Angeles, Santa Fe, Omaha, New York City, Norfolk and Wilmington. Departed U.S. May 31. |
| November 24, 1963 | November 25, 1963 | Baudouin I | King | Attended funeral of President Kennedy. |
| April 1, 1969 | April 1, 1969 | Baudouin I | King | Attended funeral of former President Eisenhower; met with President Nixon March 31. |
| 20.–May 21, 1969 | 20.–May 21, 1969 | Baudouin I | King | Informal visit. In U.S. May 17–23; visited Palm Beach, Cape Kennedy, New York City, and Houston. |
| October 18, 1977 | October 22, 1977 | Leo Tindemans | Prime Minister | Official visit. Private visit to Houston afterwards. |
| May 30, 1978 | May 31, 1978 | Leo Tindemans | Prime Minister | Attended NATO Summit conference. |
| April 20, 1980 | April 22, 1980 | Baudouin I | King | Private visit. Met with President Carter April 22. |
| 16.Feb.2.1982 | February 18, 1982 | Wilfried Martens | Prime Minister | Official working visit. |
| January 13, 1985 | January 15, 1985 | Wilfried Martens | Prime Minister | Official Working Visit. Private visit to Boston afterwards. |
| May 27, 1987 | May 27, 1987 | Wilfried Martens | Prime Minister | Private Visit. Met with President Reagan May 28. |
| August 30, 1990 | August 30, 1990 | Baudouin I | King | Met with President Bush at the U.N. General Assembly. |
| January 30, 1992 | January 30, 1992 | Wilfried Martens | Prime Minister | Met with President Bush while attending a U.N. Security Council Summit in New York City. |
| February 11, 1995 | February 15, 1995 | Jean-Luc Dehaene | Prime Minister | Official working visit. |
| April 23, 1999 | April 25, 1999 | Jean-Luc Dehaene | Prime Minister | Attended NATO's 50th Anniversary Summit. |
| September 27, 2001 | September 28, 2001 | Guy Verhofstadt | Prime Minister | Working visit. |
| January 17, 2006 | January 17, 2006 | Guy Verhofstadt | Prime Minister | Working visit. |
| April 12, 2010 | April 13, 2010 | Yves Leterme | Prime Minister | Attended the Nuclear Security Summit. |
| May 20, 2012 | May 21, 2012 | Elio Di Rupo | Prime Minister | Attended the NATO Summit meeting in Chicago |
| May 31, 2024 | May 31, 2024 | Alexander De Croo | Prime Minister | Working visit. |
| July 10, 2024 | July 11, 2024 | Alexander De Croo | Prime Minister | Attended NATO 75th Anniversary Summit in Washington, D.C. |

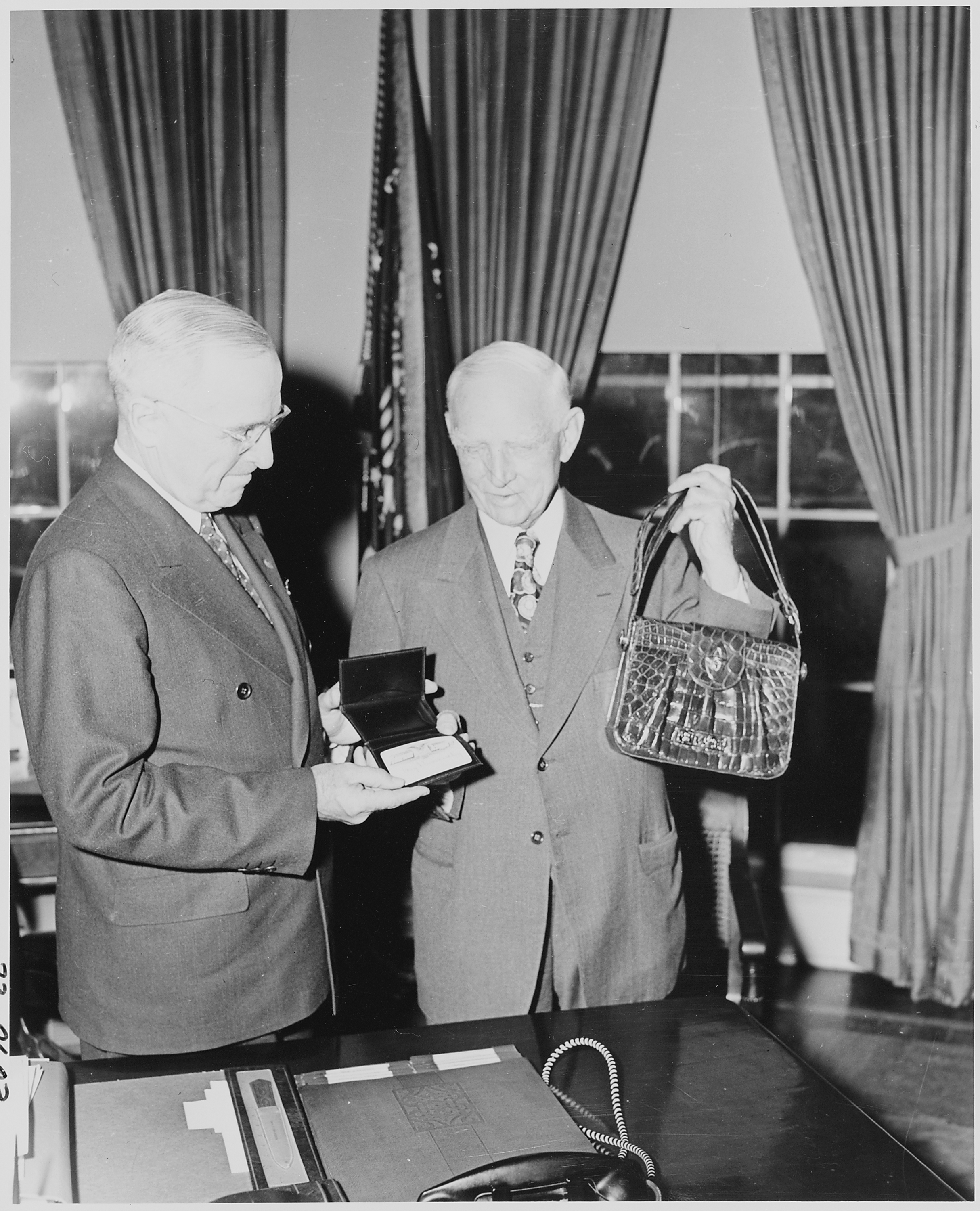

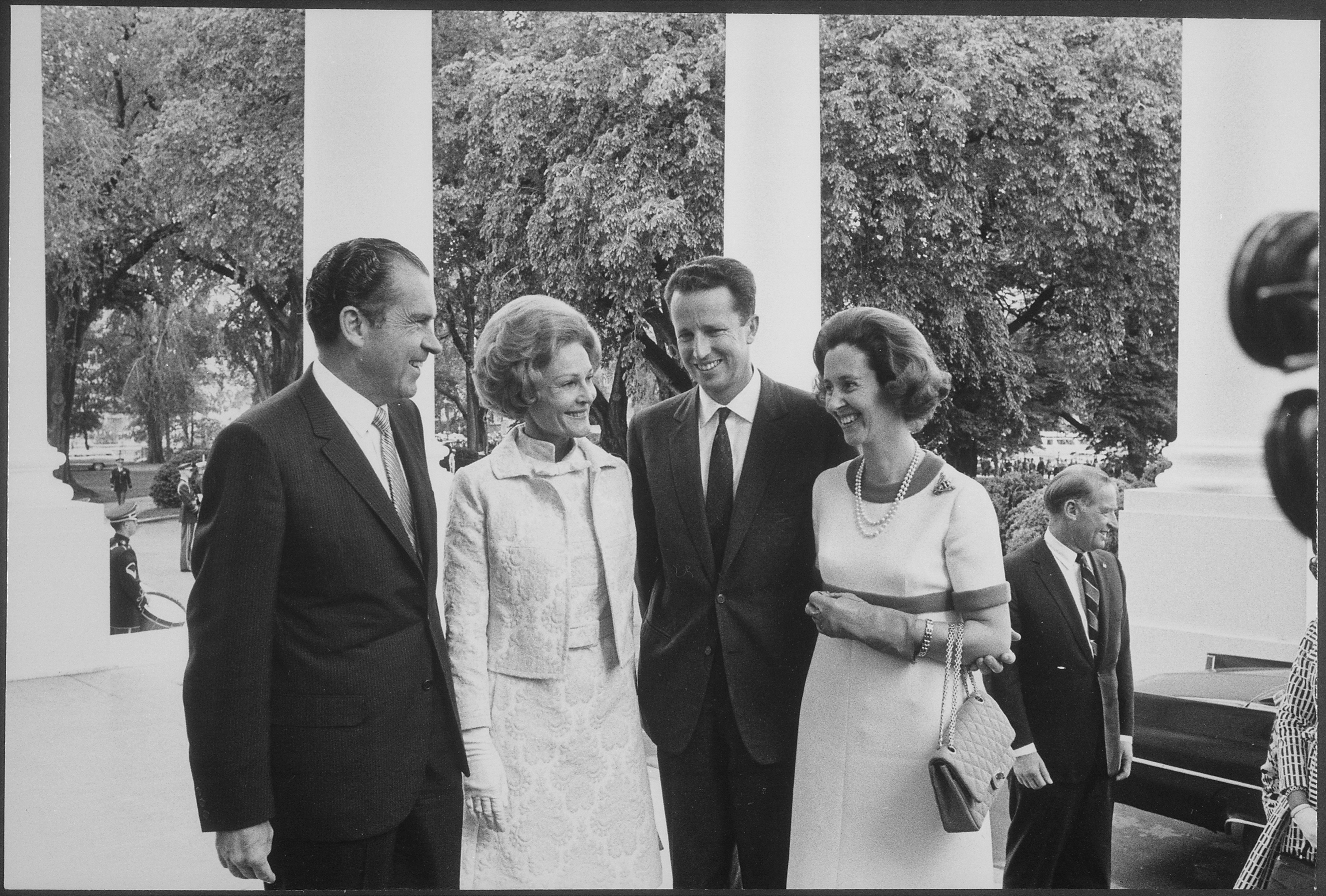

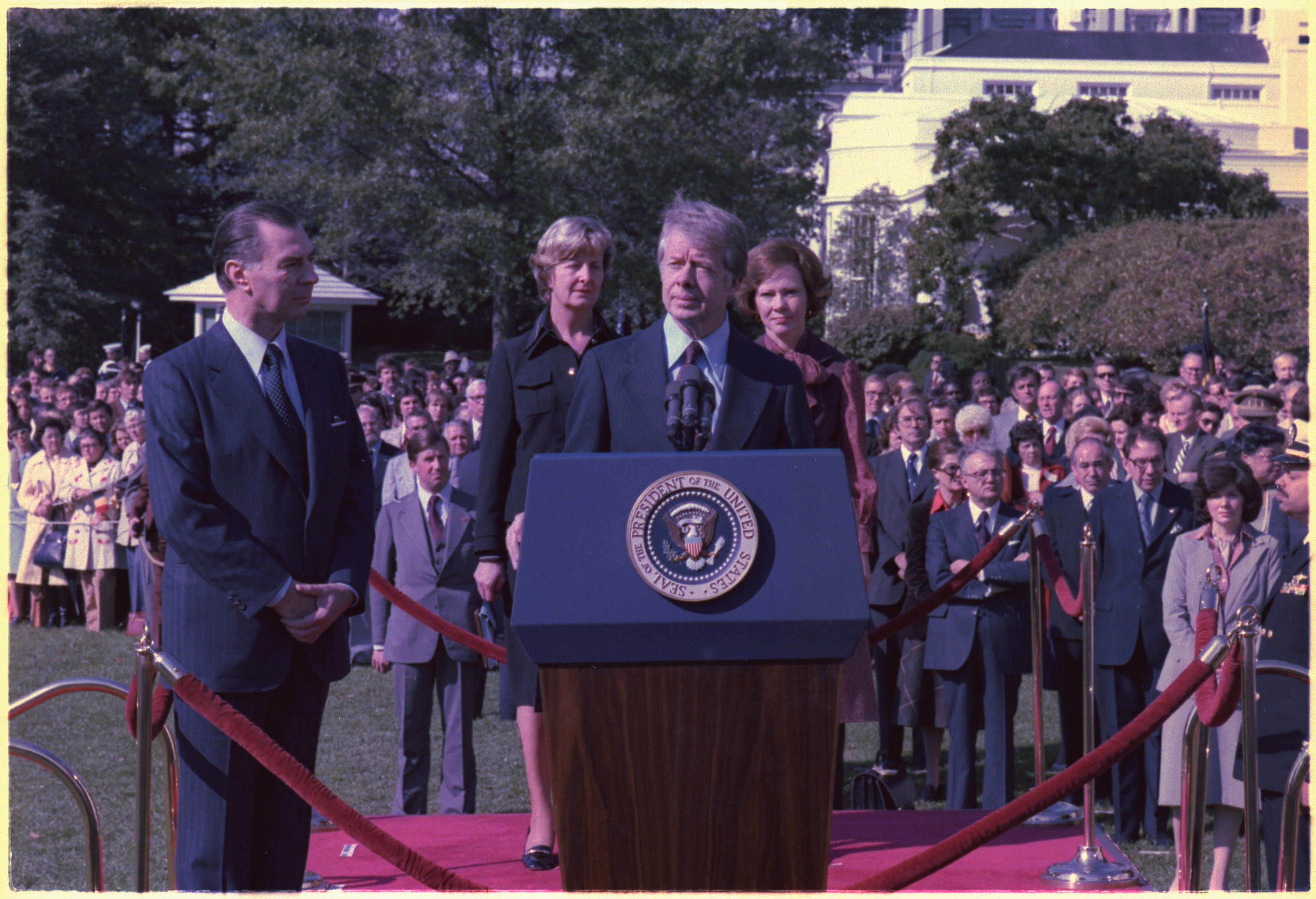

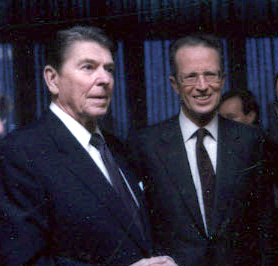

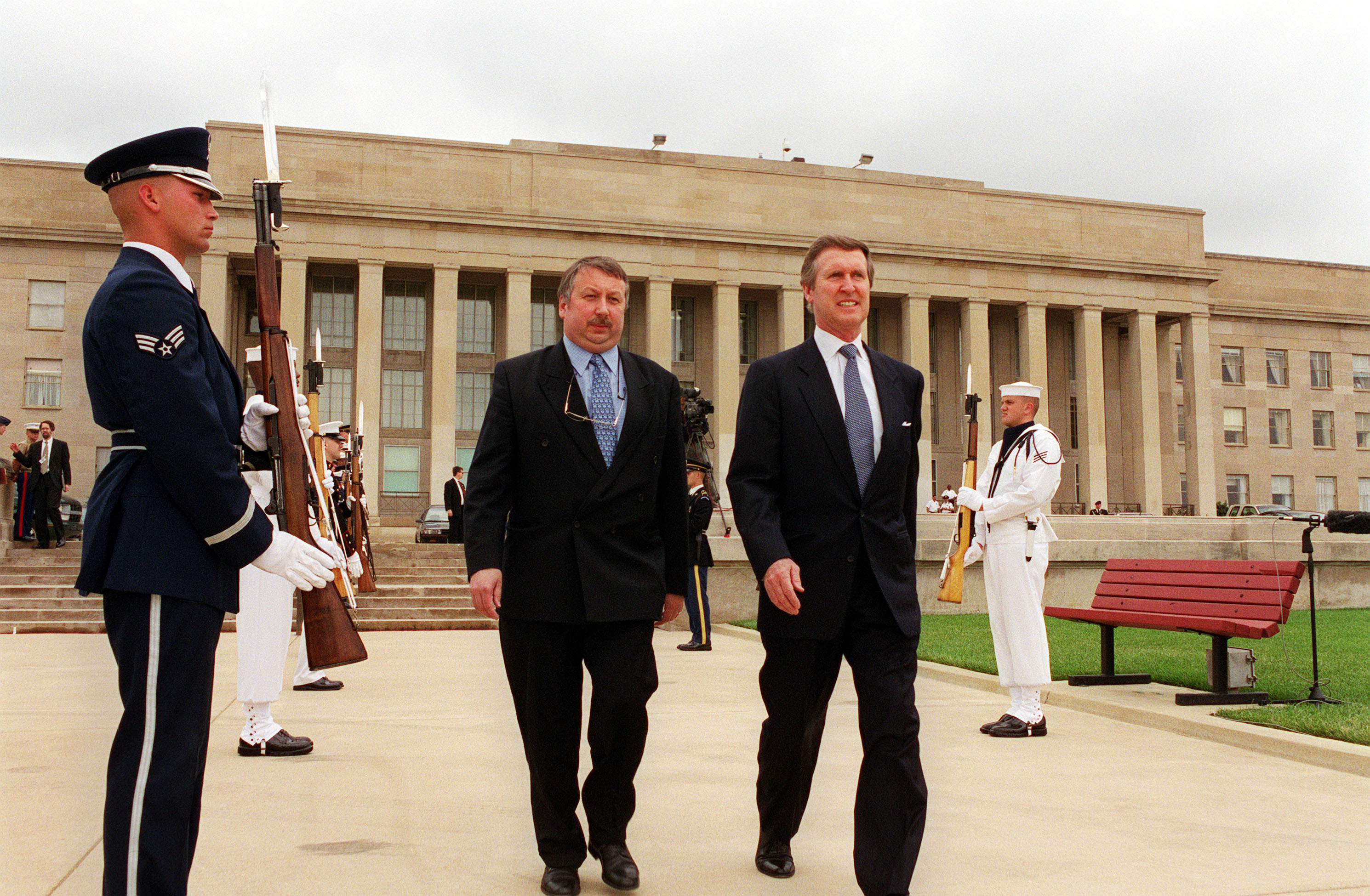

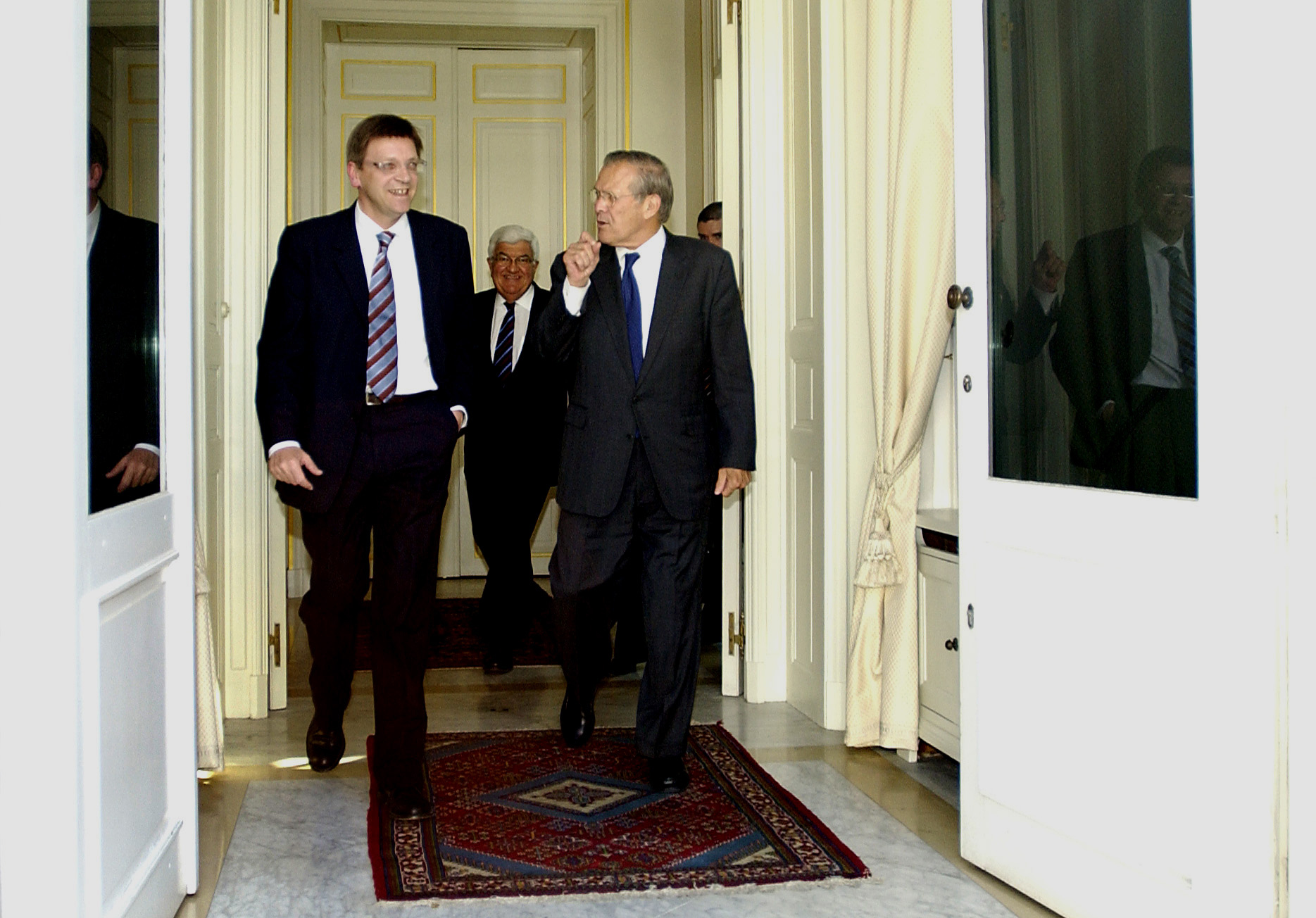

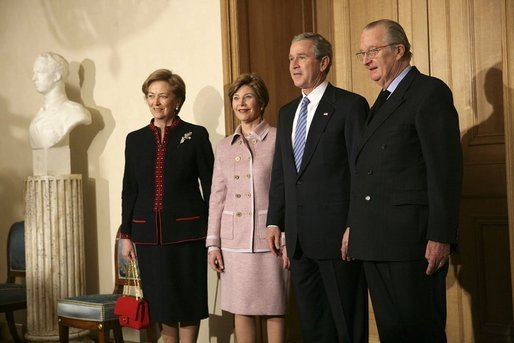

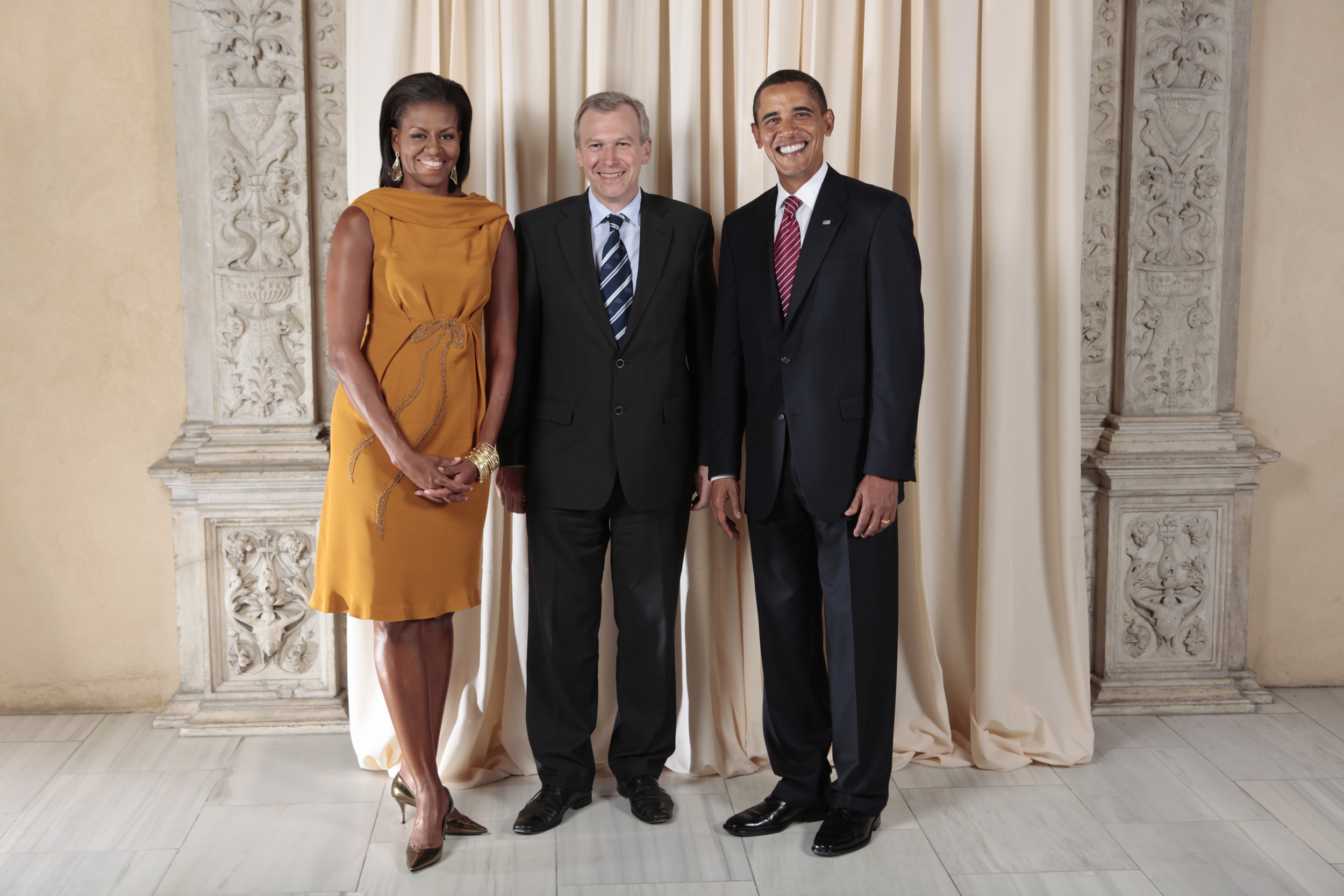

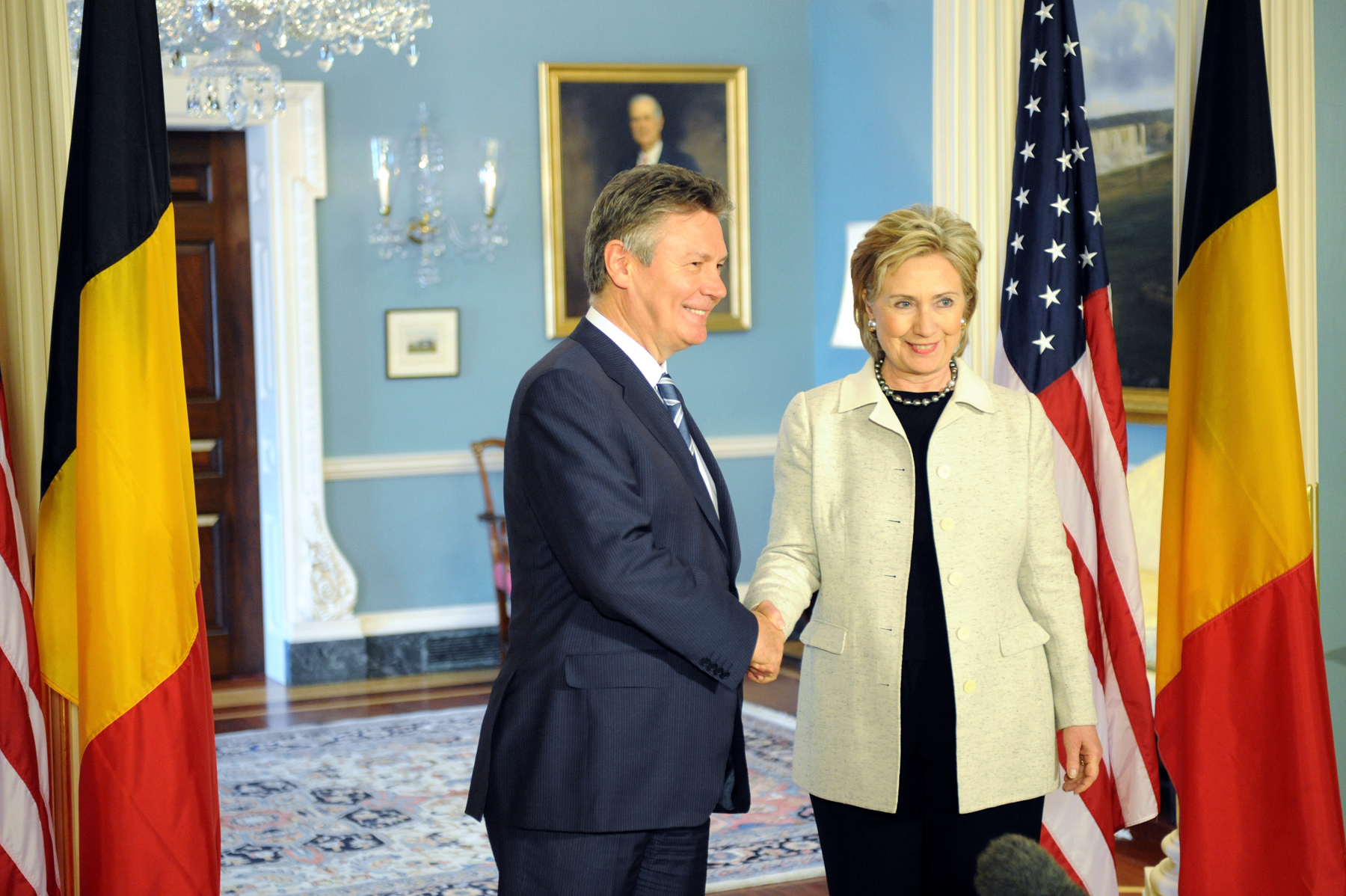

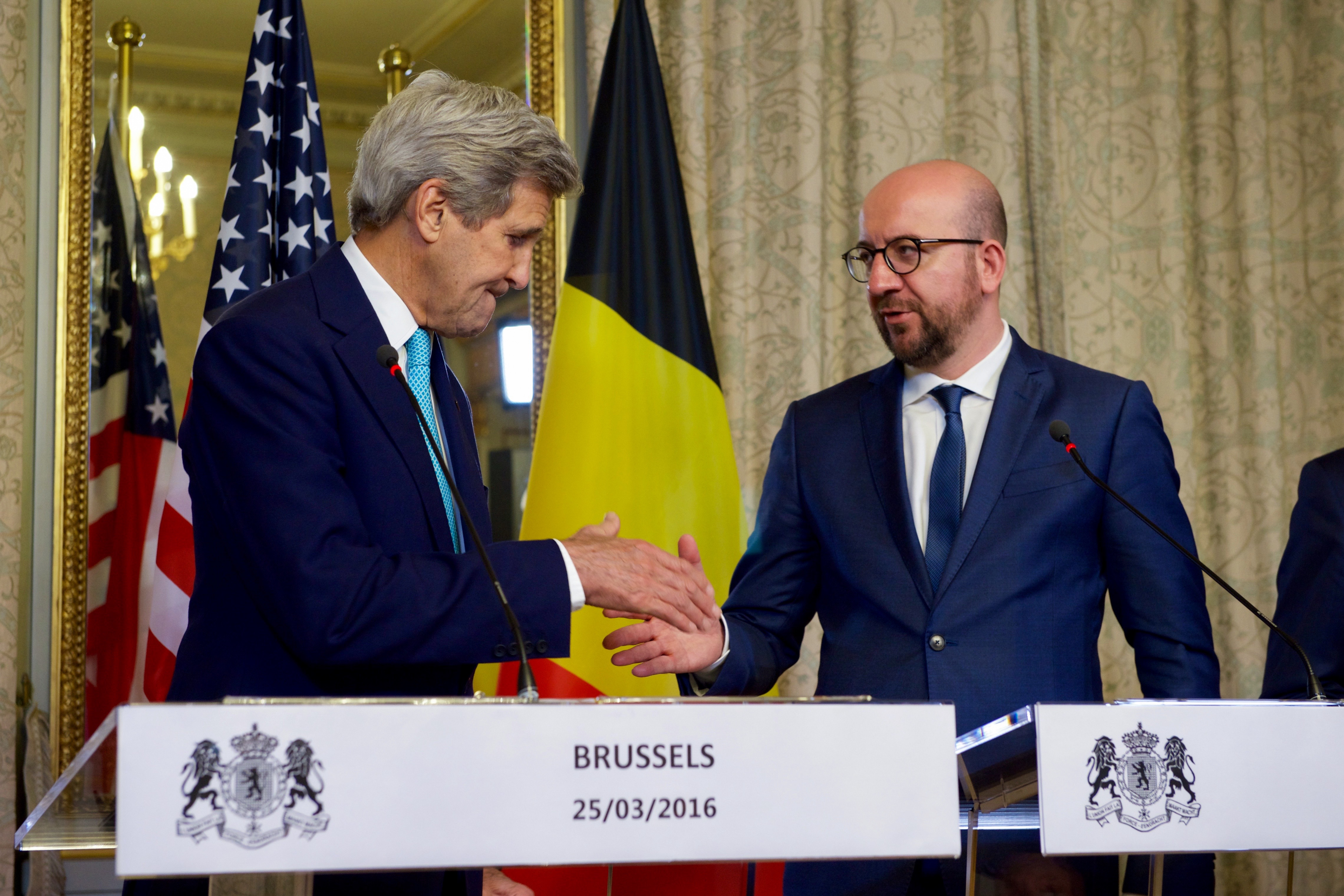

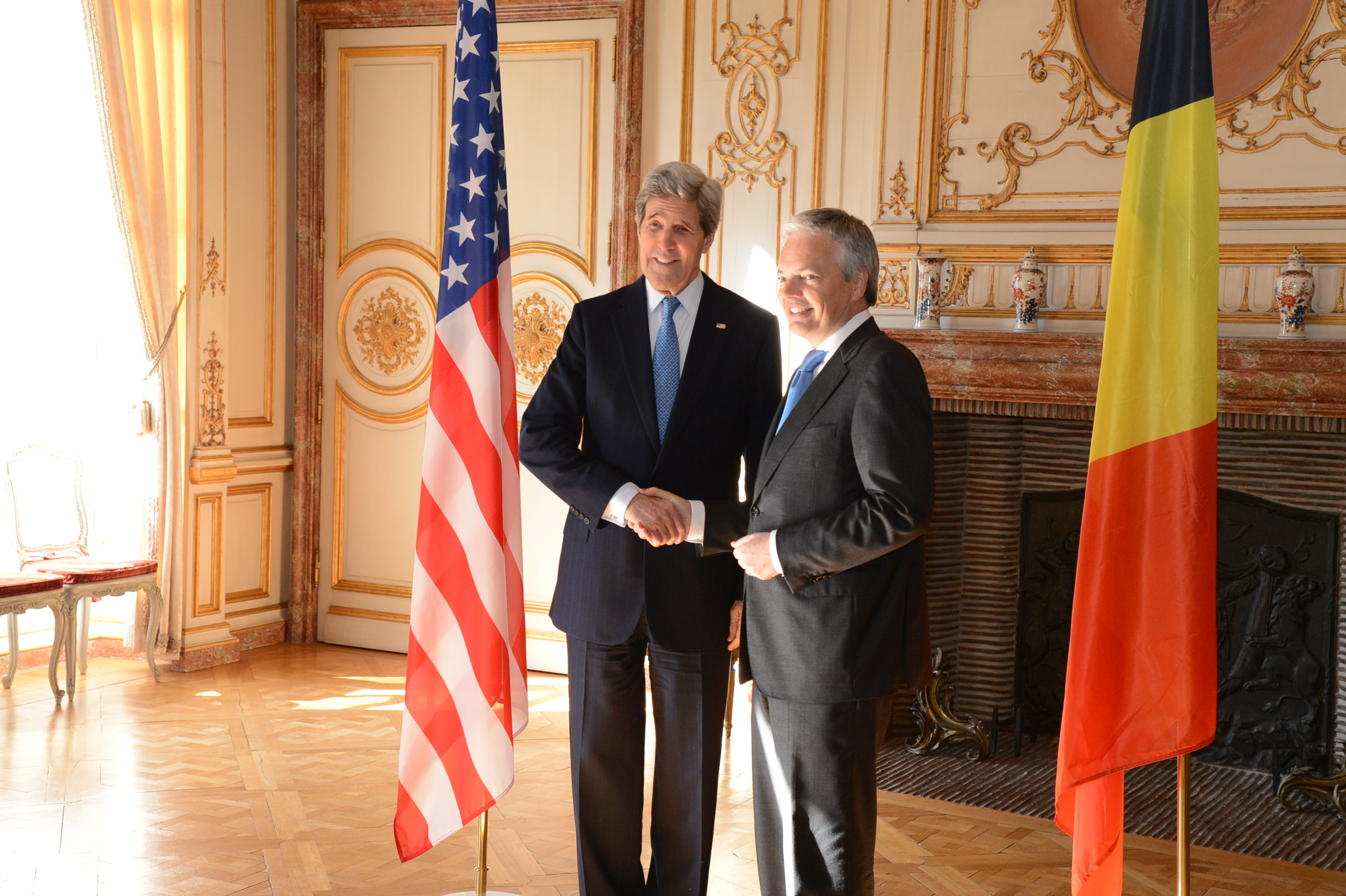

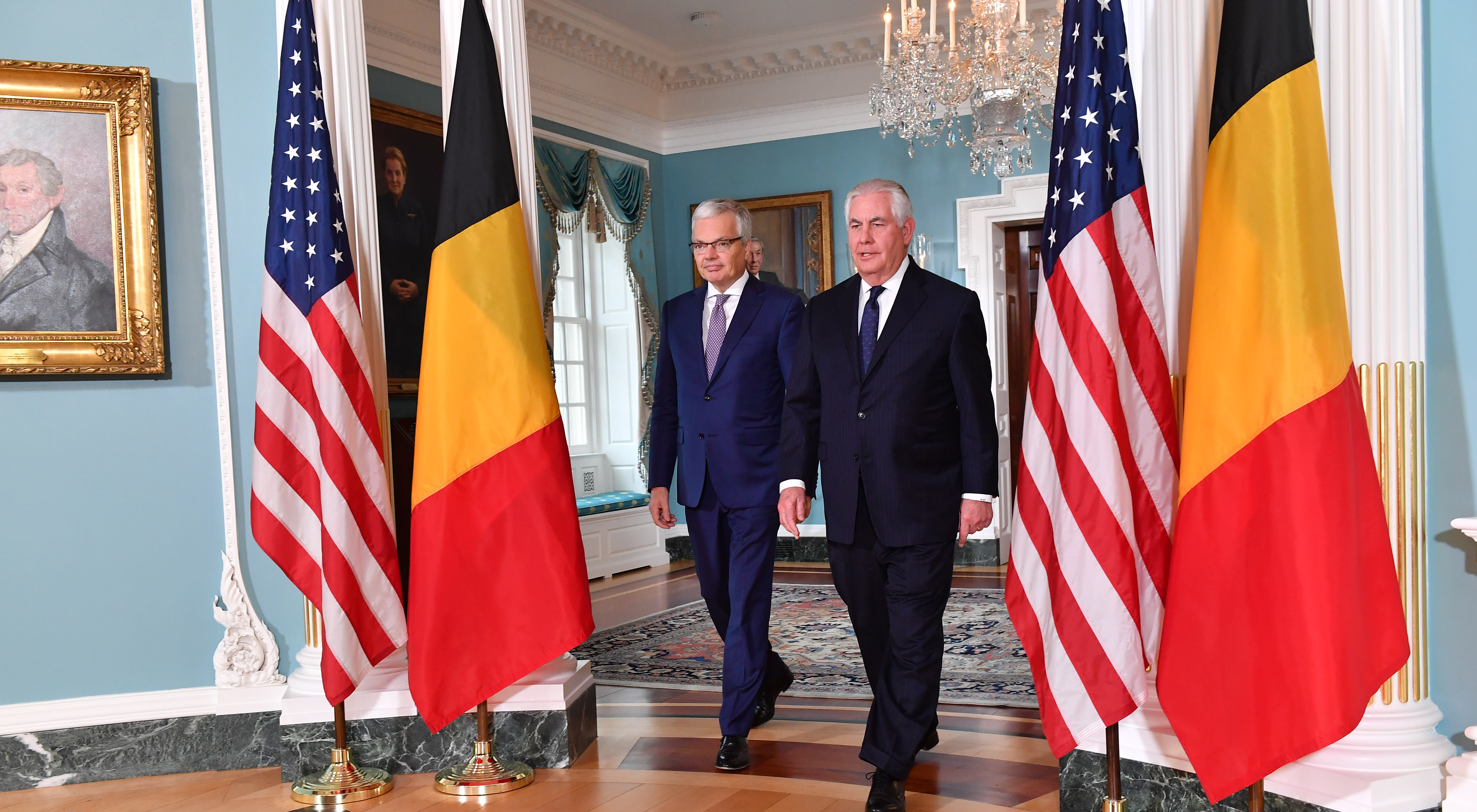

== Bosnia and Herzegovina ==
Table of Trips
| Start | End | Guest | Title | Reason |
|---|---|---|---|---|
| August 8, 1993 | August 9, 1993 | Alija Izetbegović | President | Met with President Clinton during a private visit. Arrived in the U.S. Sept. 7; also visited New York City. |
| March 17, 1994 | March 19, 1994 | Alija Izetbegović | President | Attended the signing of the Muslim-Croat federation agreement. |
| March 17, 1994 | March 19, 1994 | Haris Silajdžić | Prime Minister | Attended the signing of the Muslim-Croat federation agreement. |
| September 25, 1994 | September 25, 1994 | Alija Izetbegović | President | Discussed the Bosnian conflict with President Clinton at the U.N. General Assembly. |
| October 24, 1995 | October 24, 1995 | Alija Izetbegović | President | Met with President Clinton at the U.N. General Assembly. |
| May 14, 1996 | May 14, 1996 | Krešimir Zubak | President | Met with President Clinton after a meeting of the Federation Forum. |
| May 14, 1996 | May 14, 1996 | Izudin Kapetanović | Prime Minister | Met with President Clinton after a meeting of the Federation Forum. |
| May 14, 1996 | May 14, 1996 | Hasan Muratović | Prime Minister | Met with President Clinton after a meeting of the Federation Forum. |
| May 20, 1997 | May 26, 1997 | Alija Izetbegović | President | Private visit. Also visited New York City. |
| May 20, 2012 | May 21, 2012 | Bakir Izetbegović | President | Attended the NATO Summit meeting in Chicago |

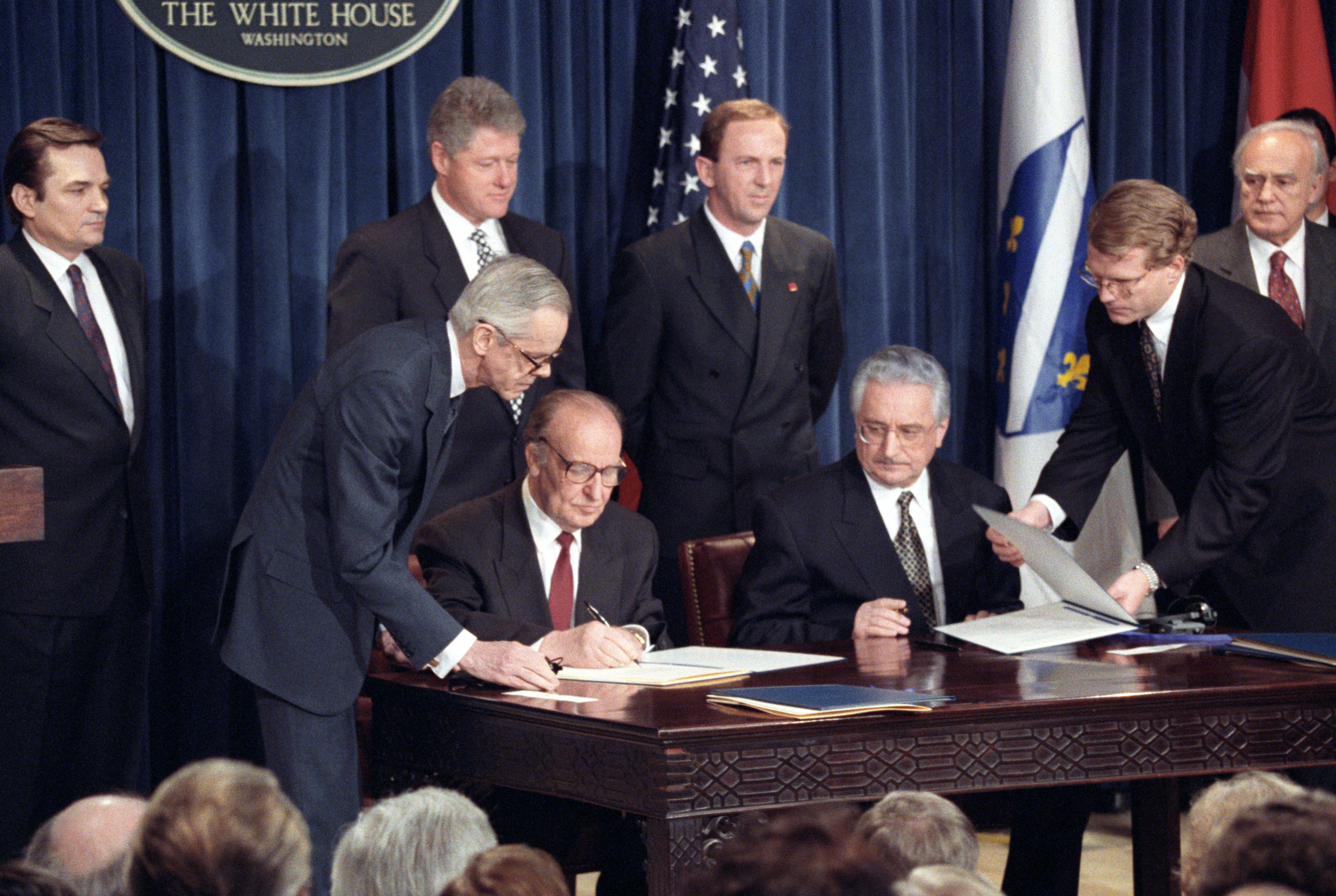

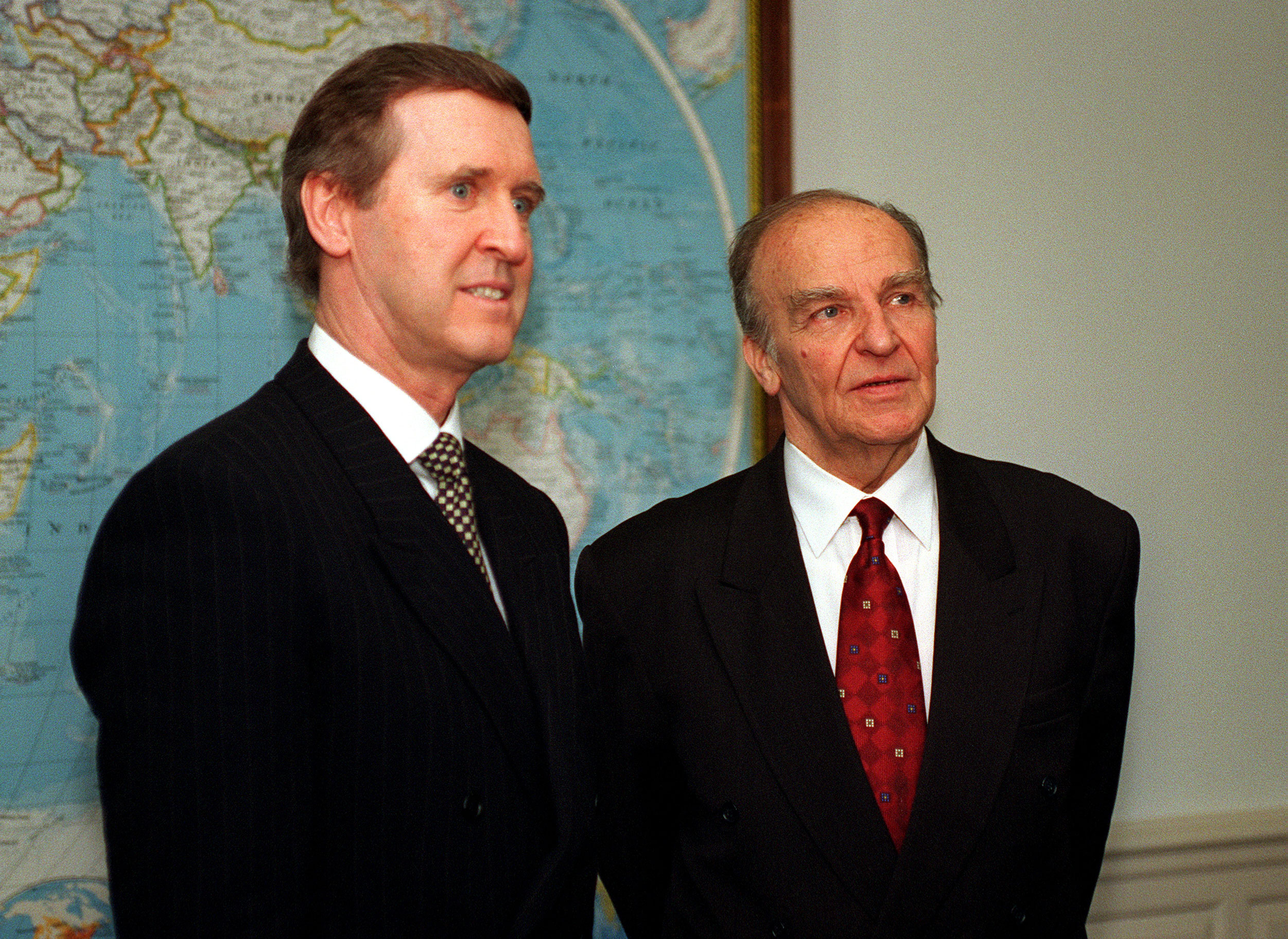

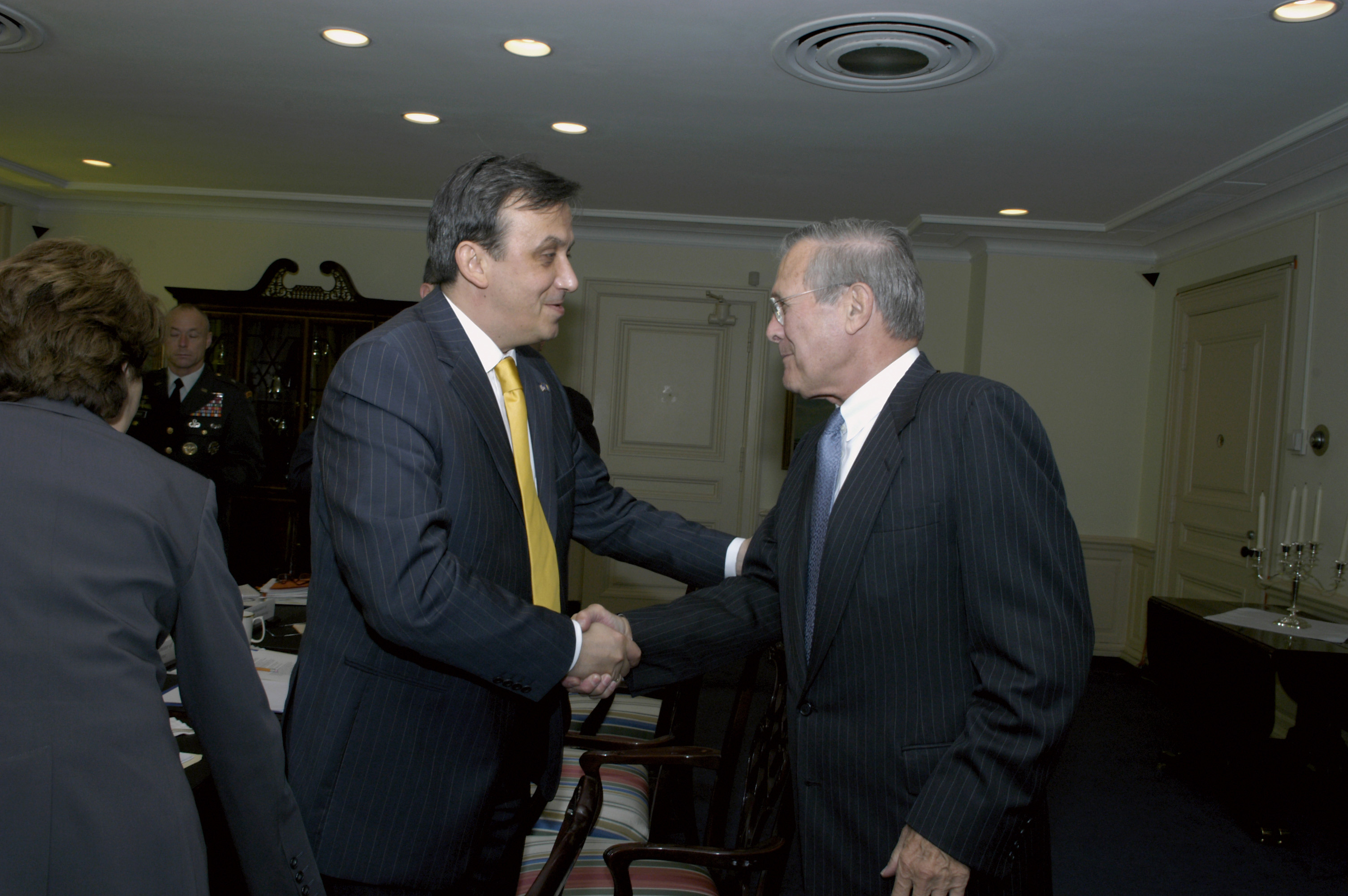

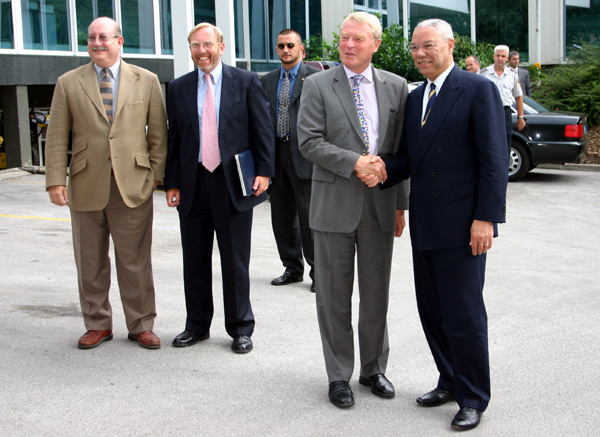

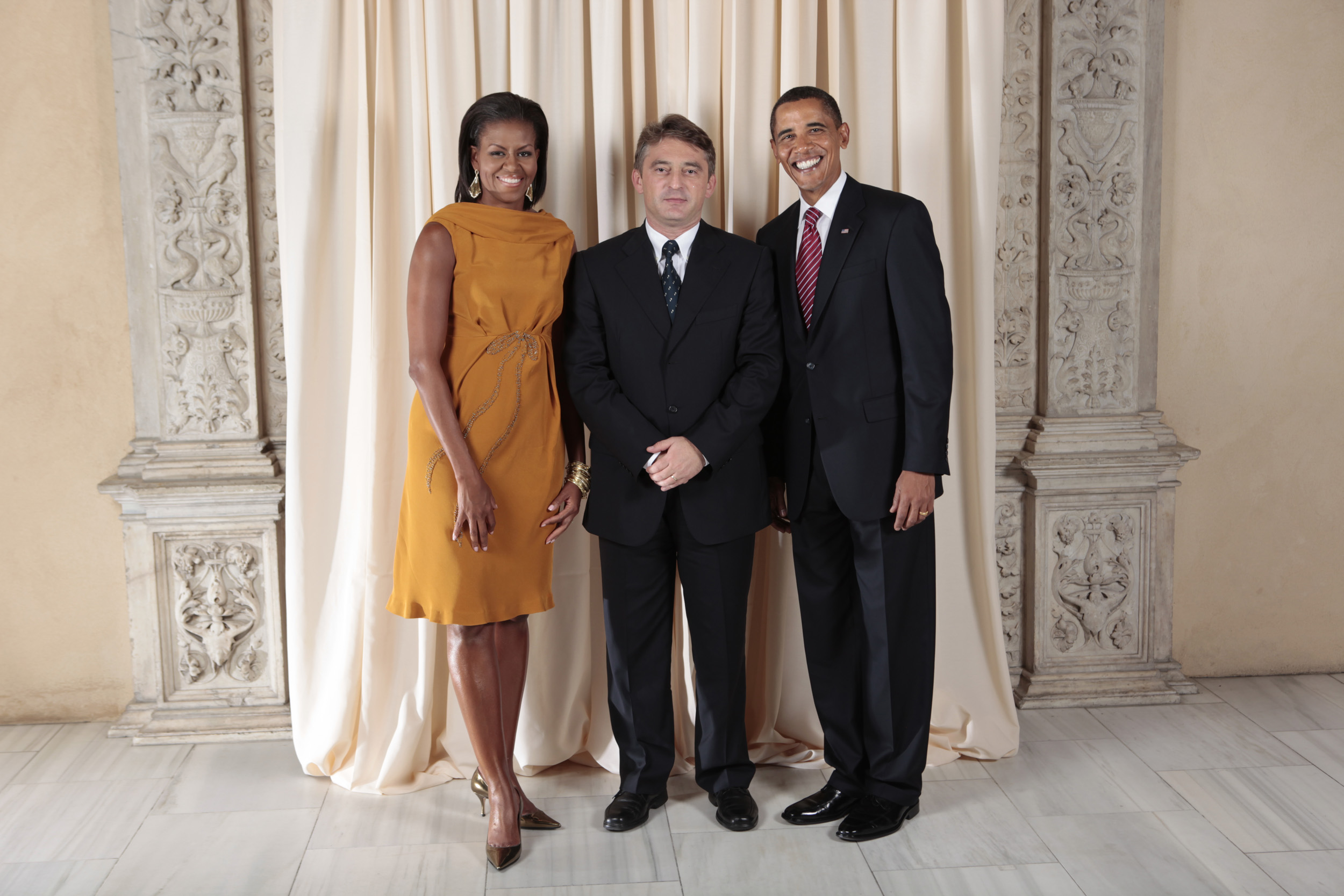

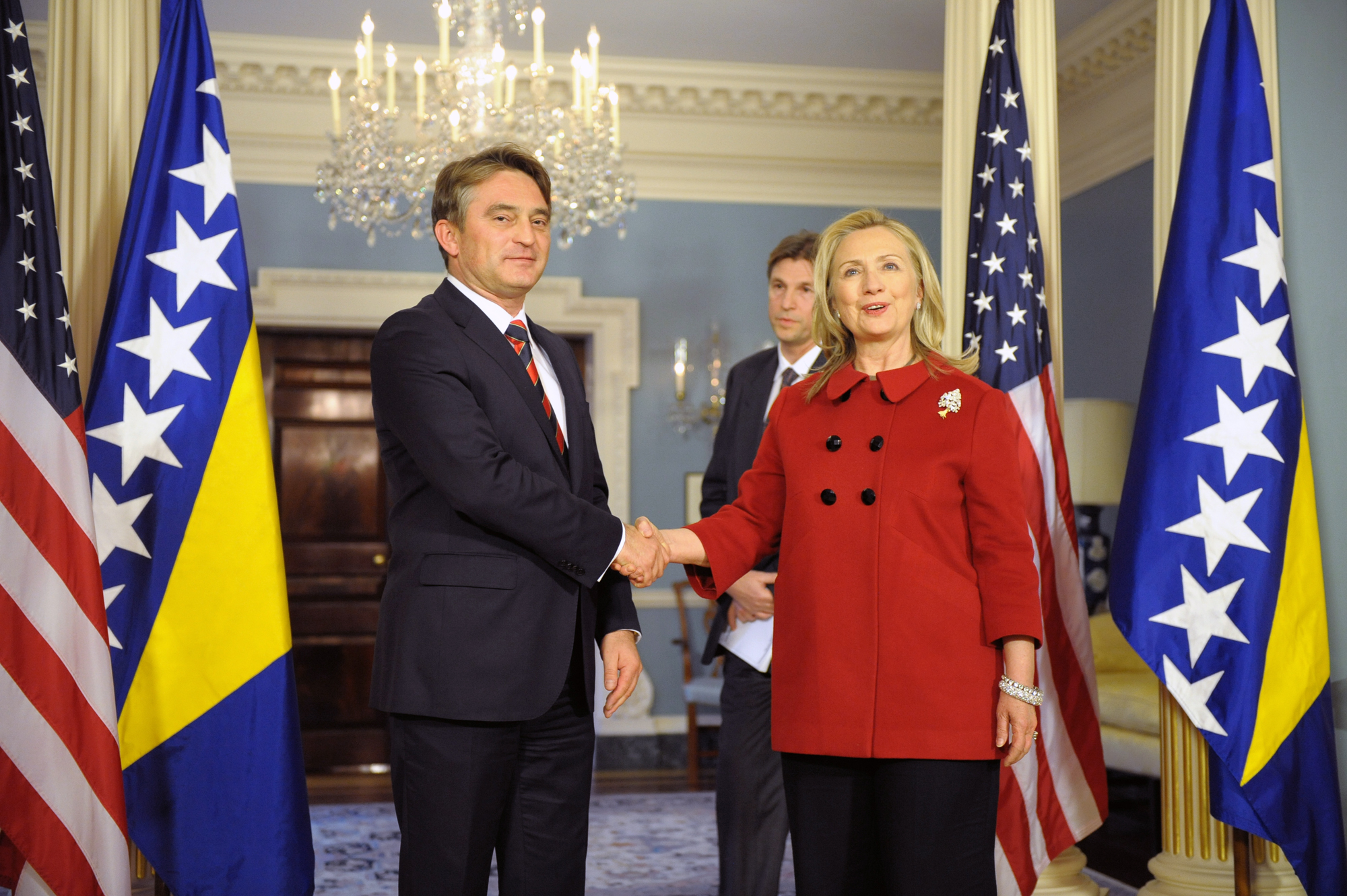

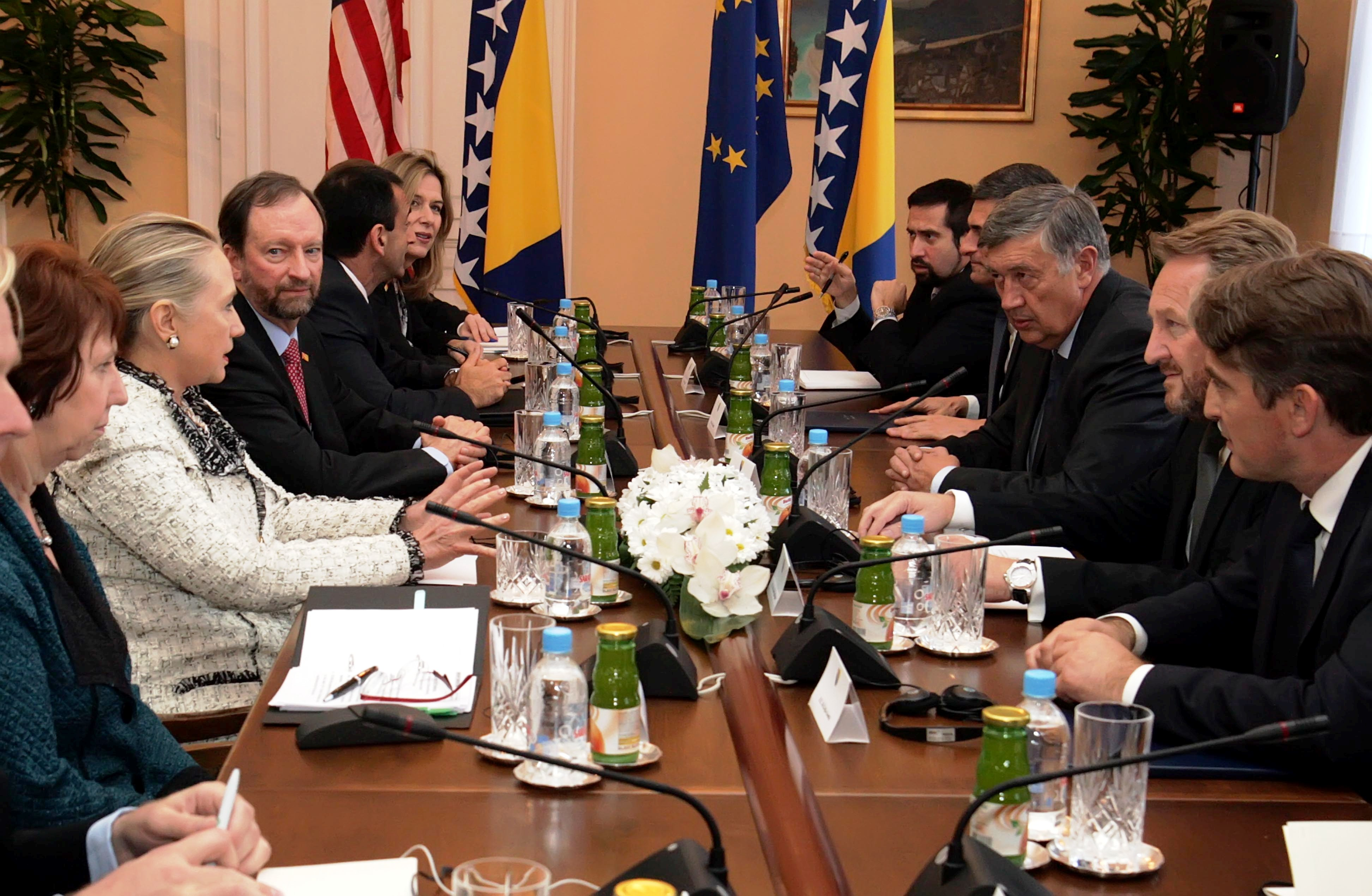

== Bulgaria ==
Table of Trips
| Start | End | Guest | Title | Reason |
|---|---|---|---|---|
| September 28, 1990 | September 28, 1990 | Zhelyu Zhelev | President | Met with President Bush during a private visit. |
| March 2, 1992 | March 5, 1992 | Philip Dimitrov | Prime Minister | Met with President Bush during a private visit. |
| April 19, 1993 | April 22, 1993 | Zhelyu Zhelev | President | Attended dedication of the Holocaust Memorial Museum and met with President Clinton on April 21. |
| February 12, 1995 | February 15, 1995 | Zhelyu Zhelev | President | Working visit. |
| February 9, 1998 | February 13, 1998 | Petar Stoyanov | President | Working visit. Afterwards visited Norfolk |
| September 22, 1998 | September 22, 1998 | Petar Stoyanov | President | Attended a forum on "Strengthening Democracy in the Global Economy" at New York University. |
| April 23, 1999 | April 25, 1999 | Petar Stoyanov | President | Attended NATO's 50th Anniversary Summit. |
| April 20, 2002 | April 25, 2002 | Simeon Saxe-Coburg Gotha | Prime Minister | Working visit. |
| February 24, 2003 | February 25, 2003 | Simeon Saxe-Coburg Gotha | Prime Minister | Working visit. |
| March 27, 2004 | March 30, 2004 | Simeon Saxe-Coburg Gotha | Prime Minister | Working visit. Attended NATO Accession ceremony. |
| October 17, 2005 | October 17, 2005 | Georgi Purvanov | President | Working visit. |
| June 16, 2008 | June 18, 2008 | Sergei Stanishev | Prime Minister | Working visit. |
| May 20, 2012 | May 21, 2012 | Rosen Plevneliev | President | Attended the NATO Summit meeting in Chicago |
| December 3, 2012 | December 3, 2012 | Boiko Borisov | Prime Minister | Working visit. |
| November 25, 2019 | November 25, 2019 | Boiko Borisov | Prime Minister | Working visit. |
| July 10, 2024 | July 11, 2024 | Dimitar Glavchev | Prime Minister | Attended NATO 75th Anniversary Summit in Washington, D.C. |

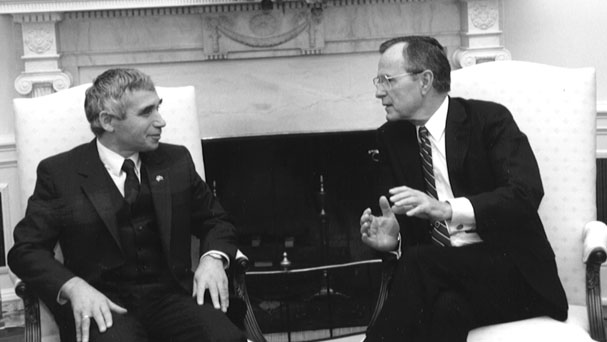

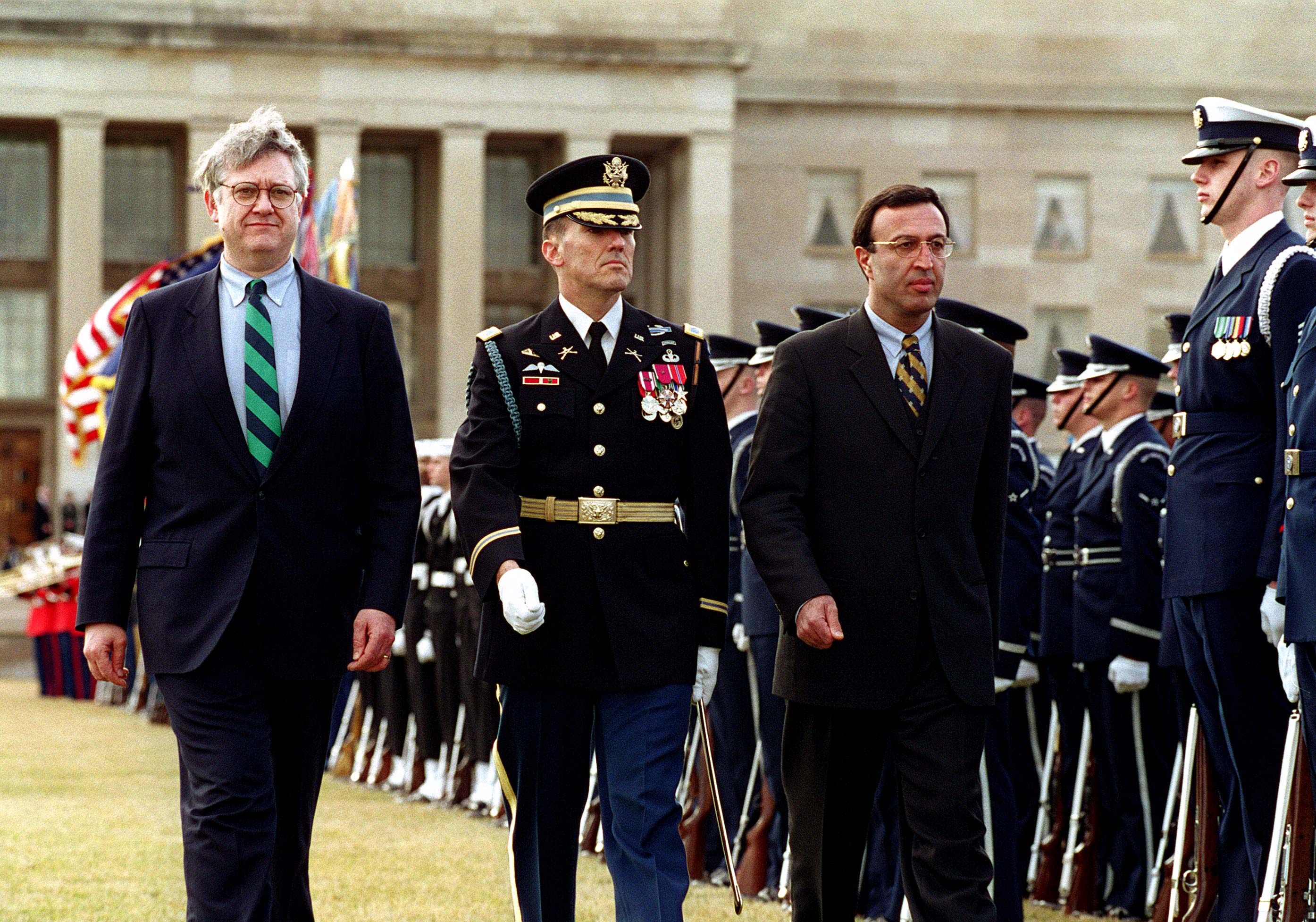

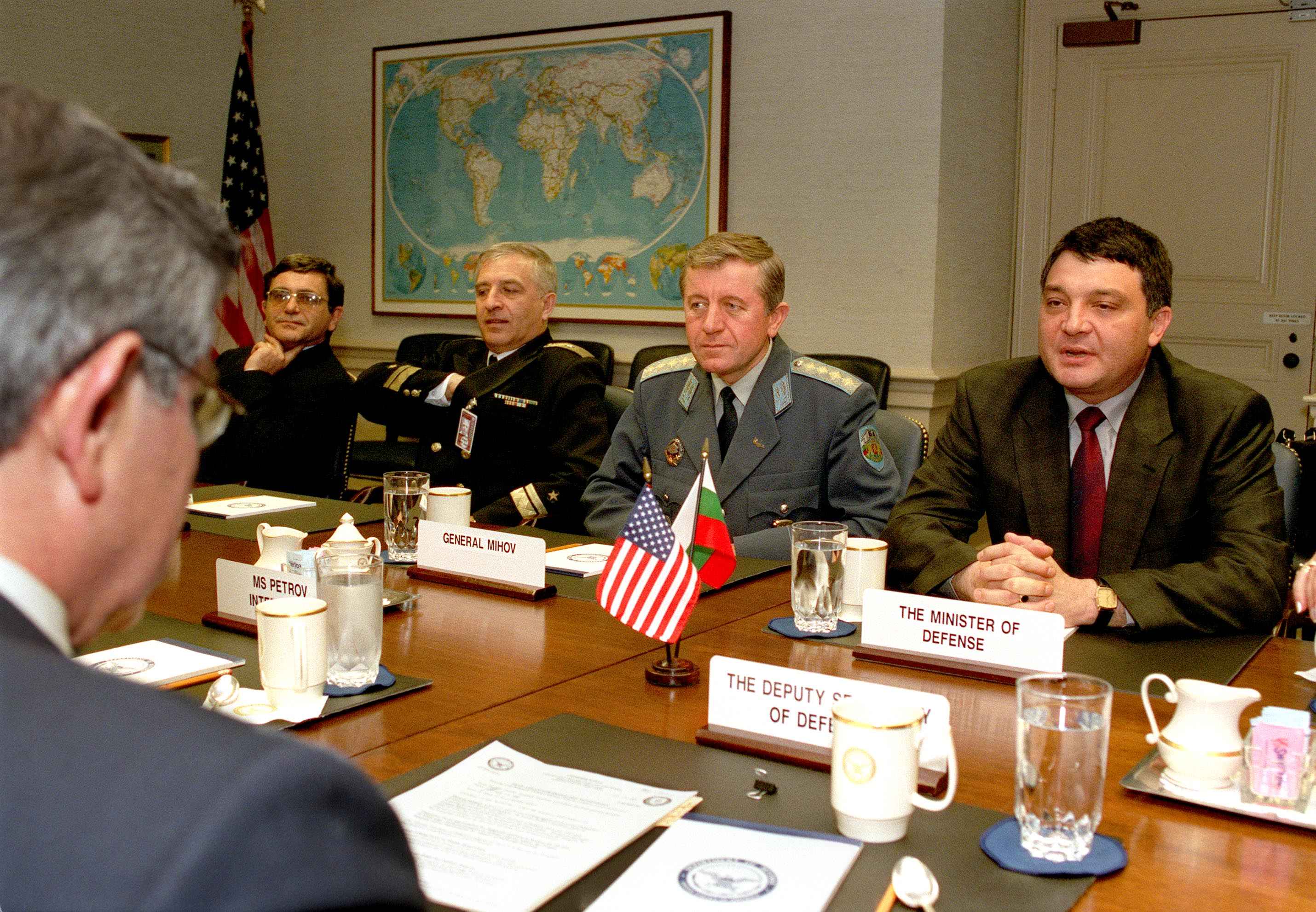

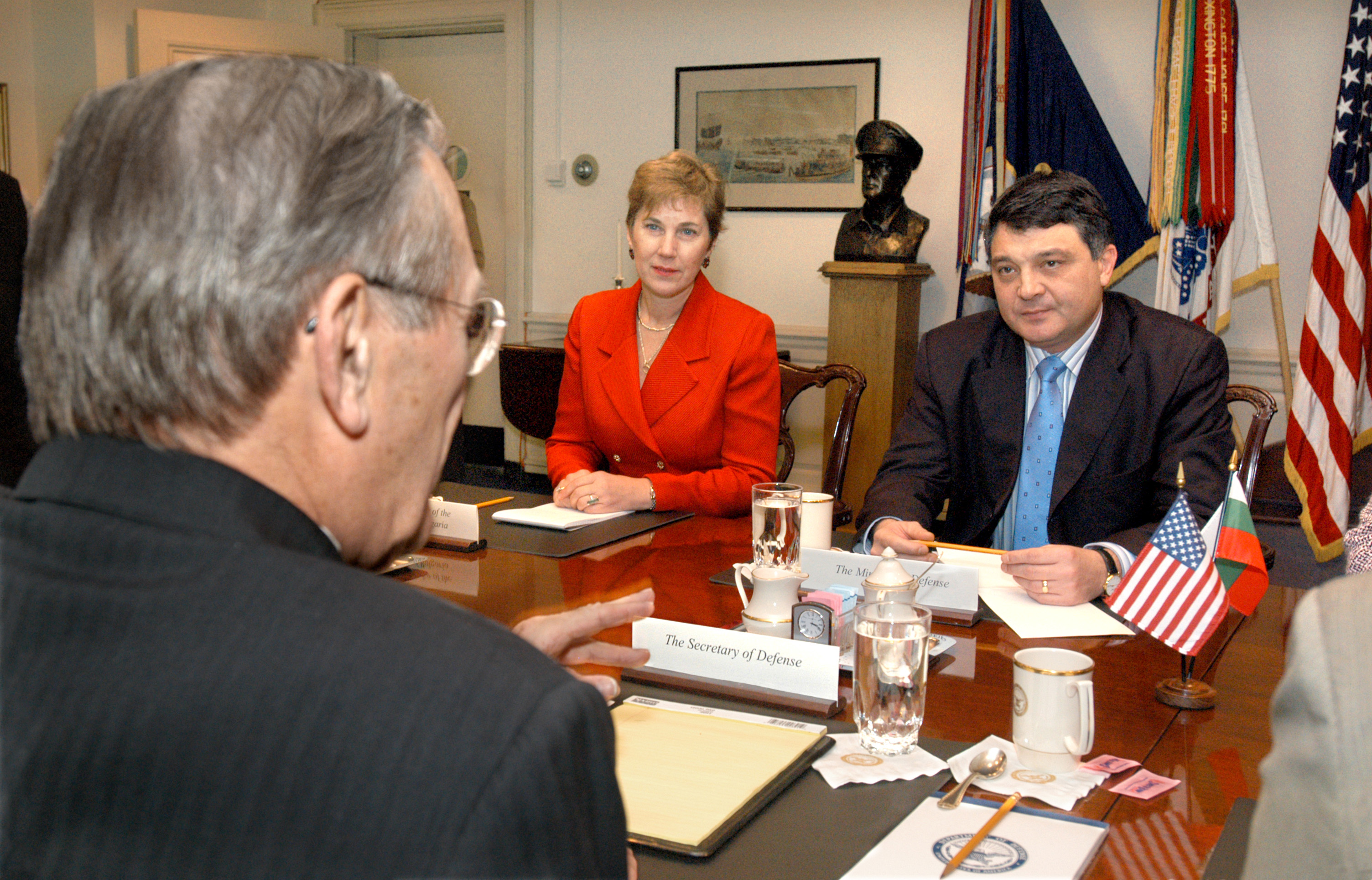

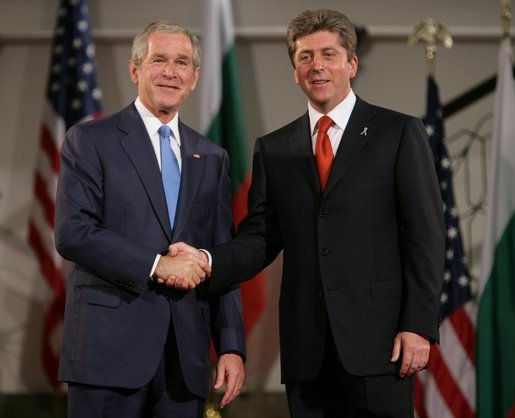

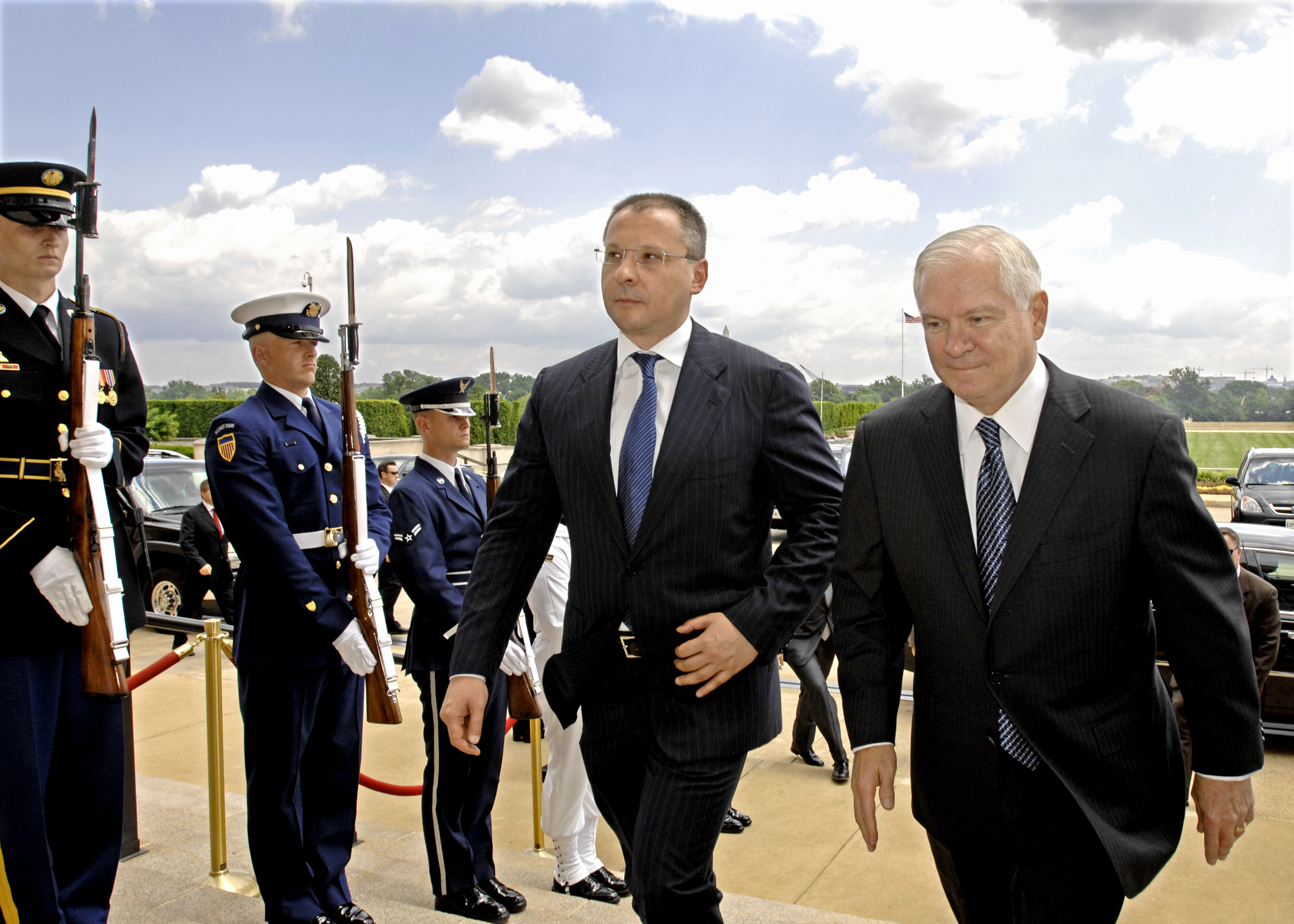

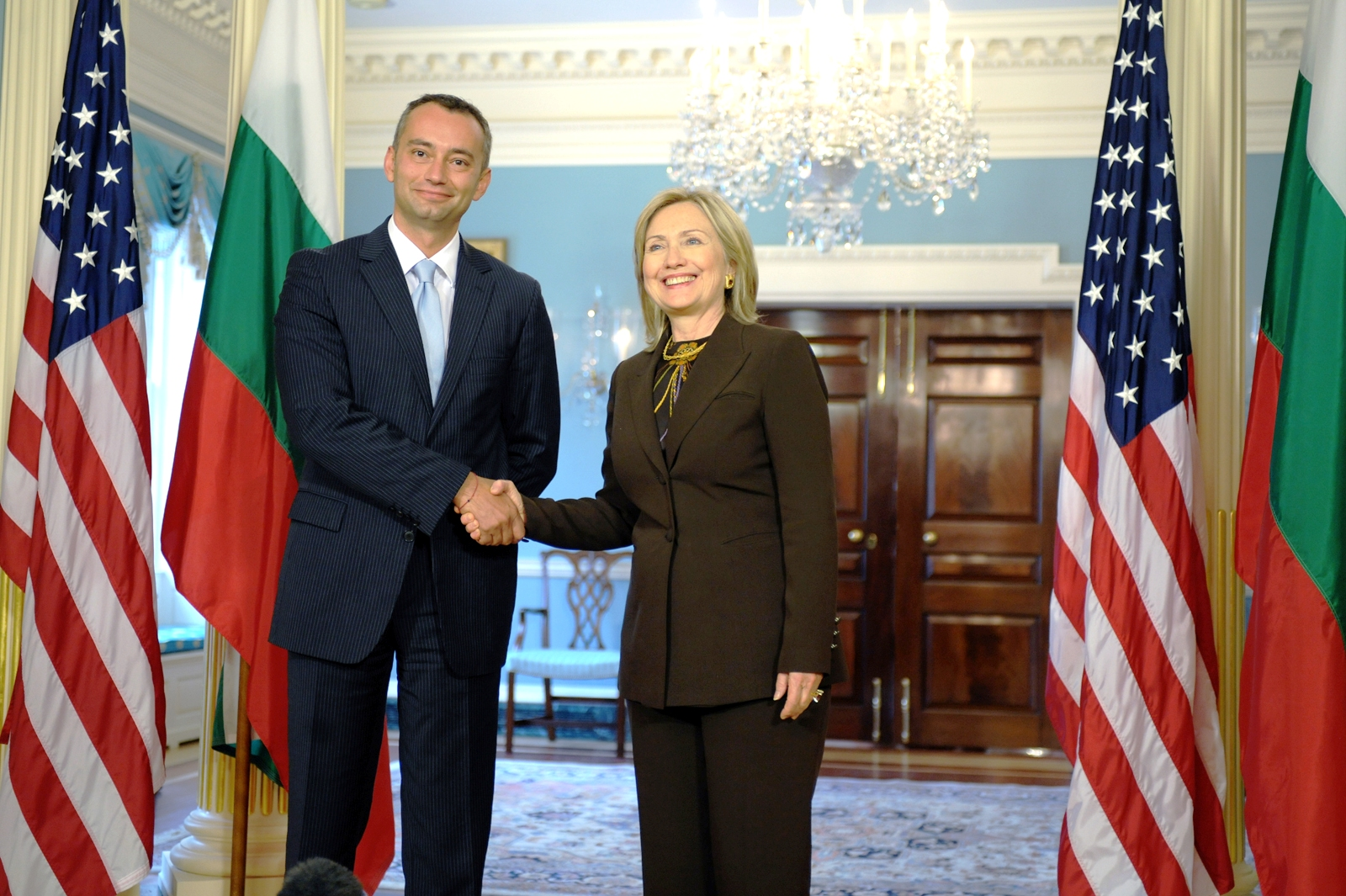

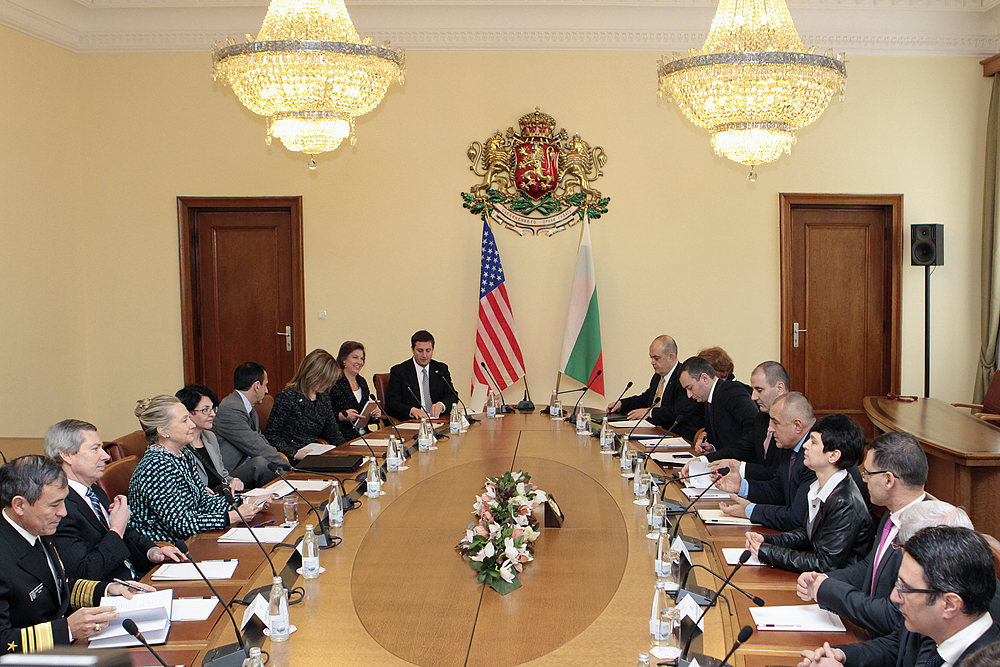

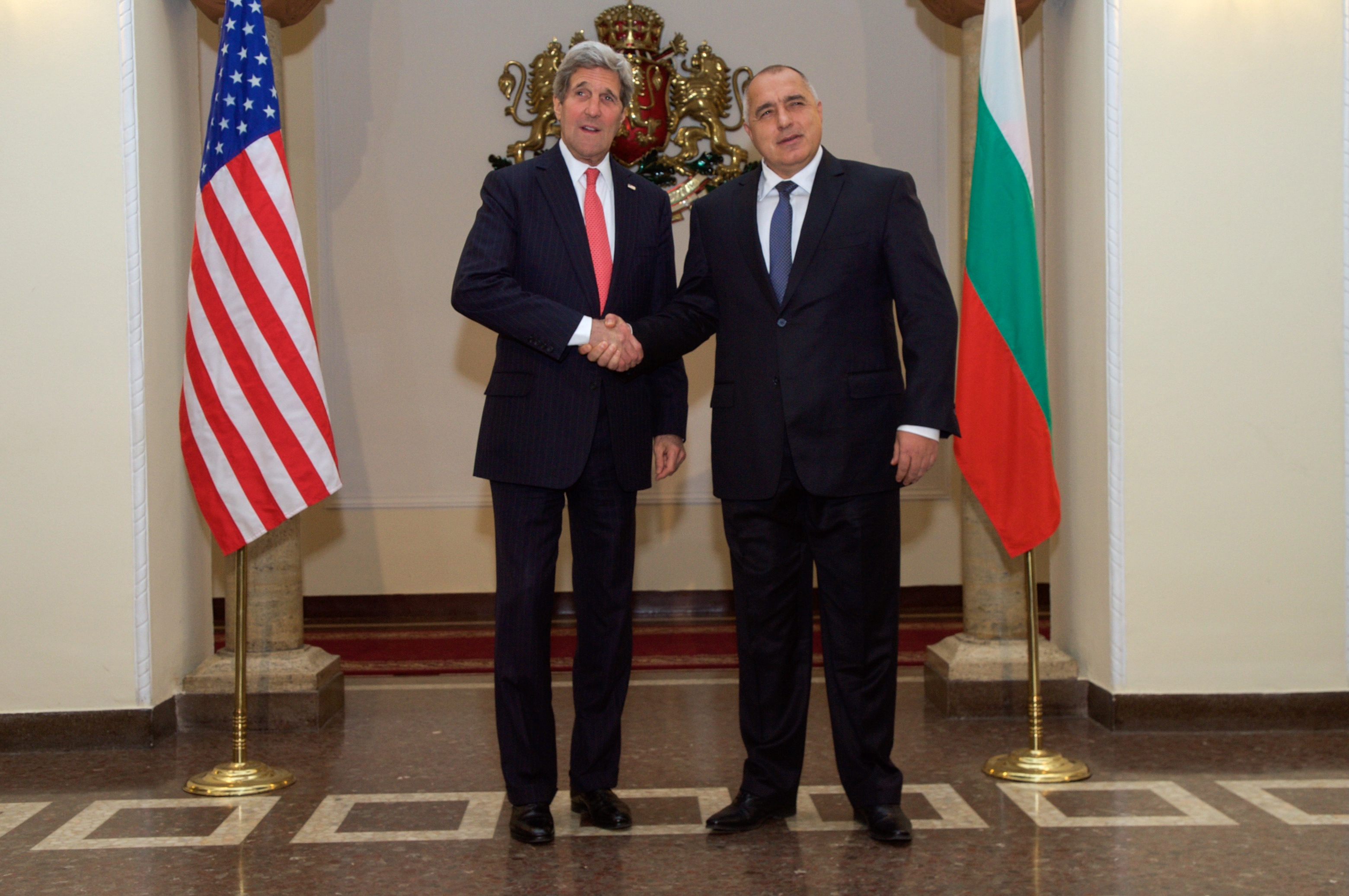

== Croatia ==
Table of Trips
| Start | End | Guest | Title | Reason |
|---|---|---|---|---|
| April 18, 1993 | April 22, 1993 | Franjo Tuđman | President | Attended dedication of the Holocaust Memorial Museum and met with President Clinton on April 21. |
| March 17, 1994 | March 20, 1994 | Franjo Tuđman | President | Attended the signing of the Muslim-Croat federation agreement. |
| March 15, 1995 | March 16, 1995 | Franjo Tuđman | President | Attended commemoration of the first anniversary of the Bosnian-Croatian Federation. |
| October 24, 1995 | October 24, 1995 | Franjo Tuđman | President | Met with President Clinton at the UN General Assembly in New York City. |
| April 9, 1996 | April 11, 1996 | Zlatko Mateša | Prime Minister | Attended funeral service for Commerce Secretary Ron Brown |
| August 1, 1996 | August 2, 1996 | Franjo Tuđman | President | Working visit. |
| August 7, 2000 | August 10, 2000 | Stjepan Mesić | President | Working visit. |
| August 7, 2000 | August 10, 2000 | Ivica Račan | Prime Minister | Working visit. |
| June 6, 2002 | June 6, 2002 | Ivica Račan | Prime Minister | Official working visit. |
| March 28, 2004 | March 30, 2004 | Ivo Sanader | Prime Minister | Working visit. Attended NATO Accession ceremony. |
| October 15, 2006 | October 18, 2006 | Ivo Sanader | Prime Minister | Working visit. |
| May 20, 2012 | May 21, 2012 | Zoran Milanović | Prime Minister | Attended the NATO Summit meeting in Chicago |
| July 10, 2024 | July 11, 2024 | Zoran Milanović | President | Attended NATO 75th Anniversary Summit in Washington, D.C. |

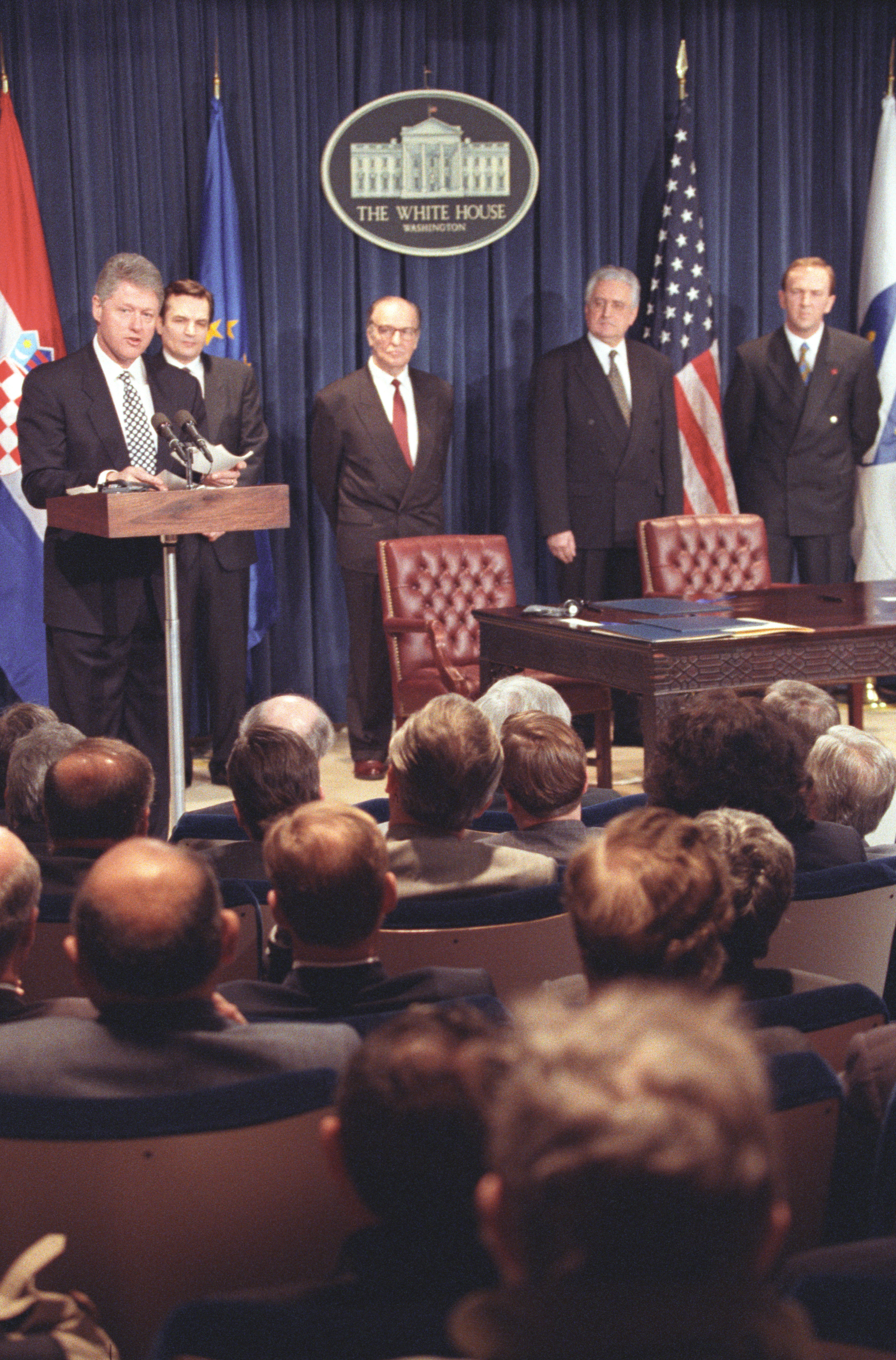

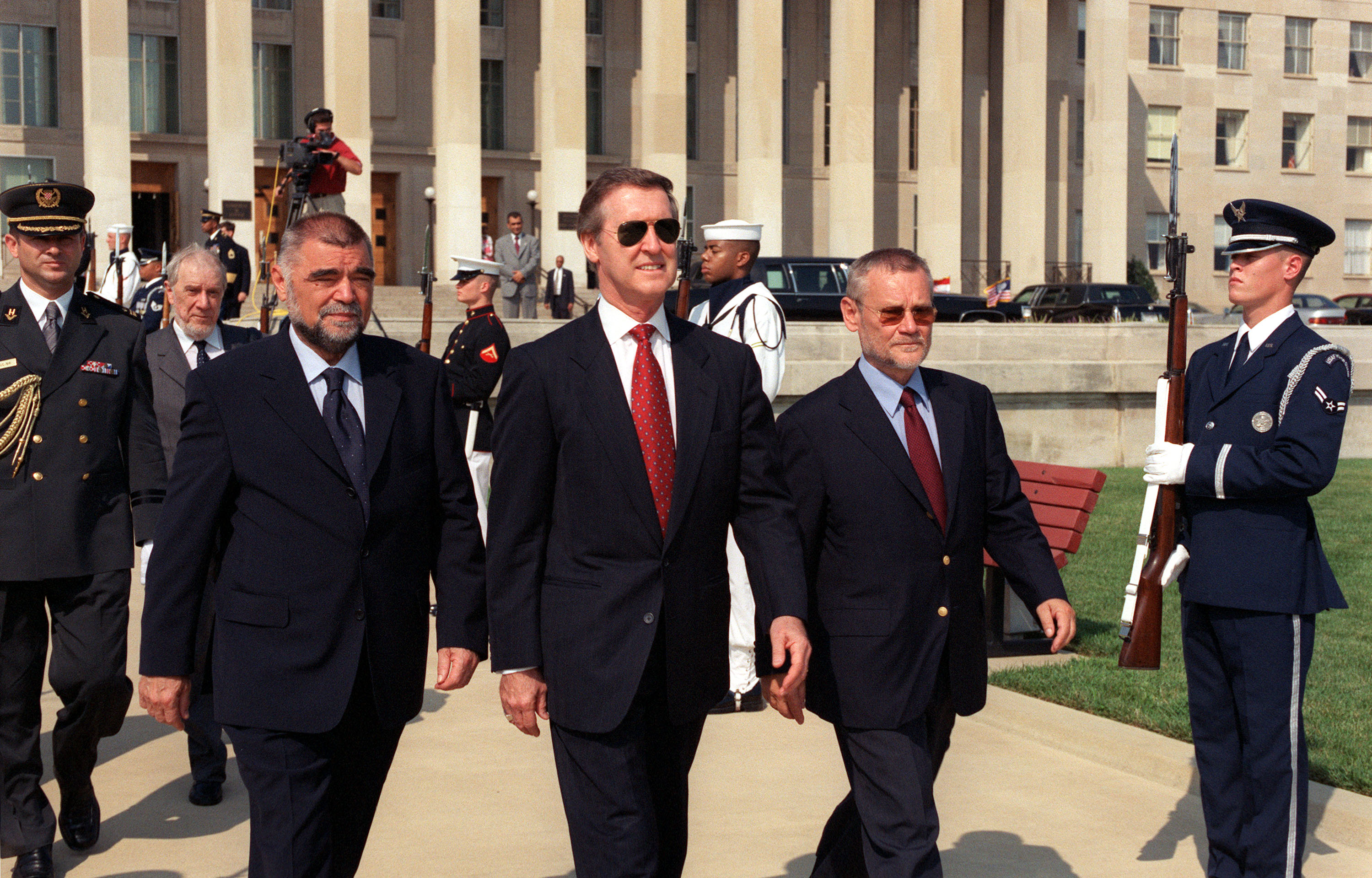

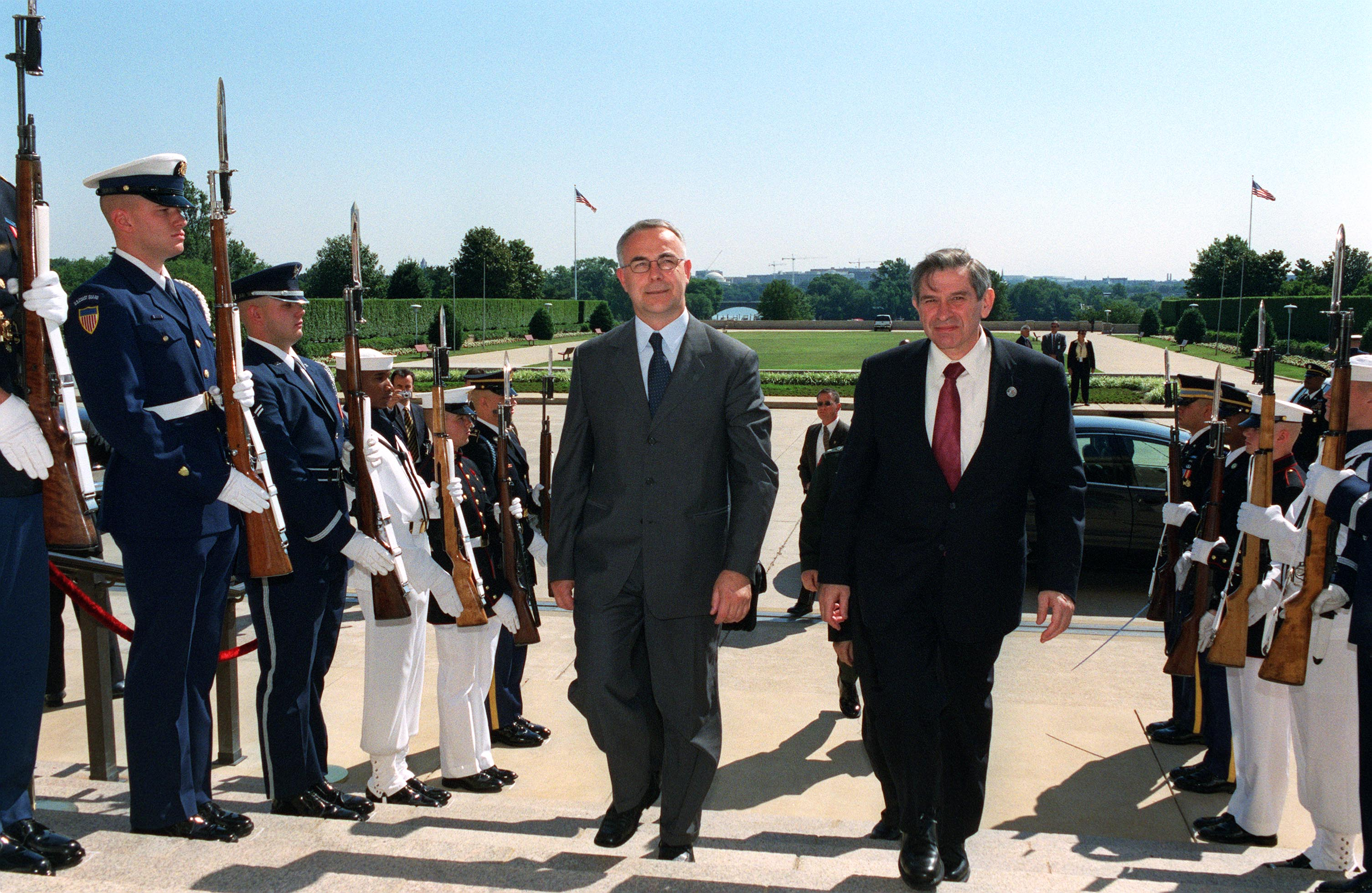

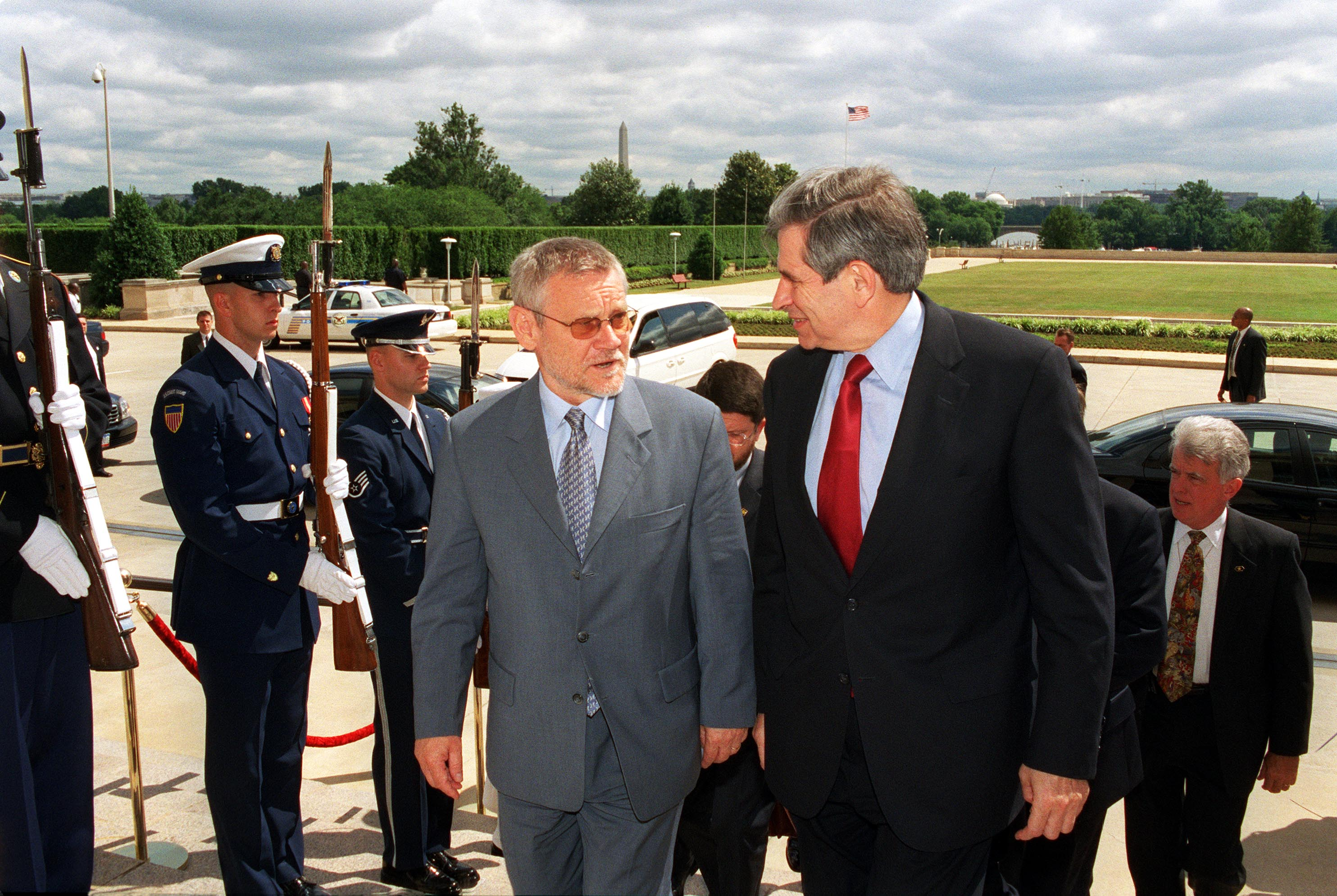

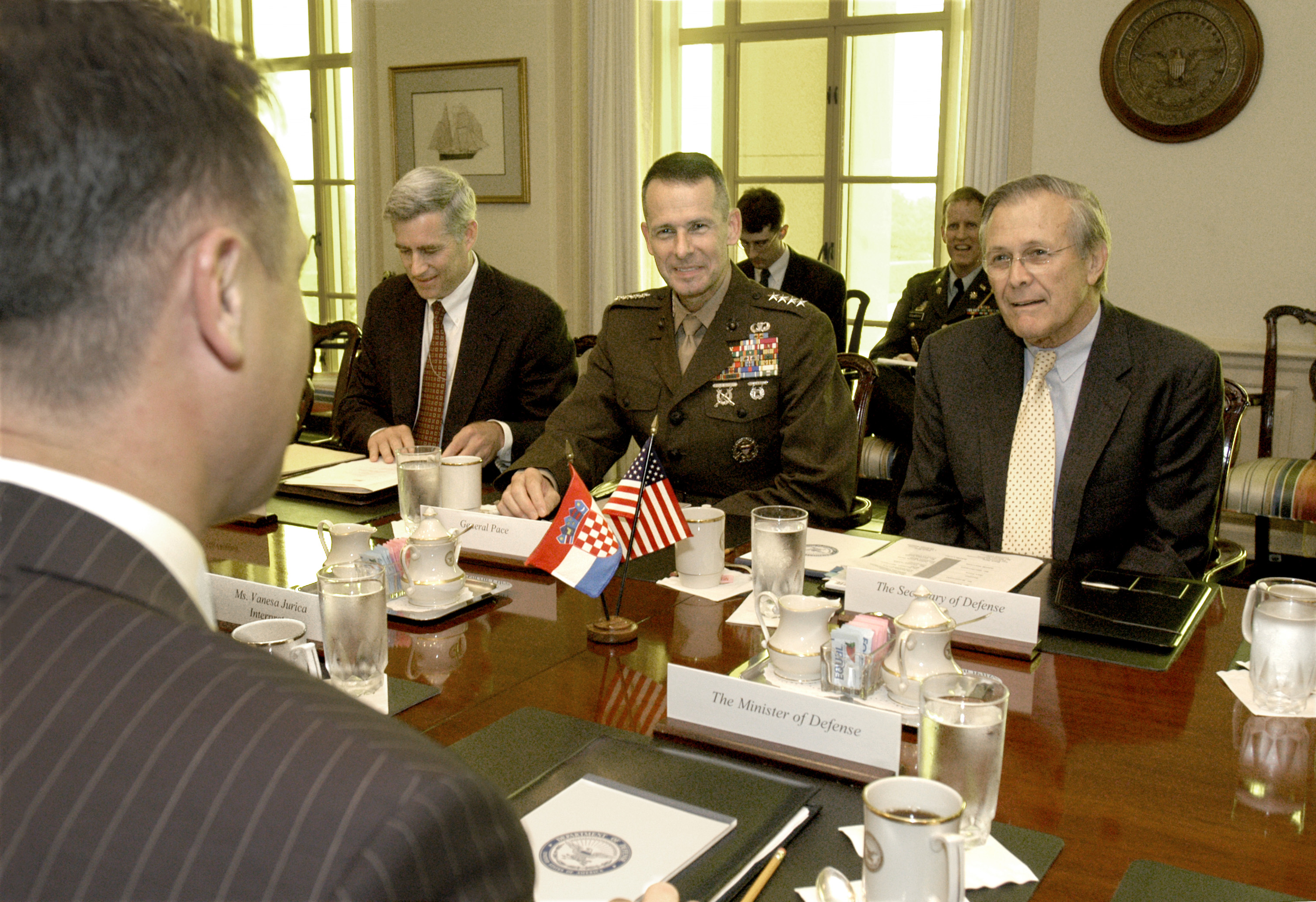

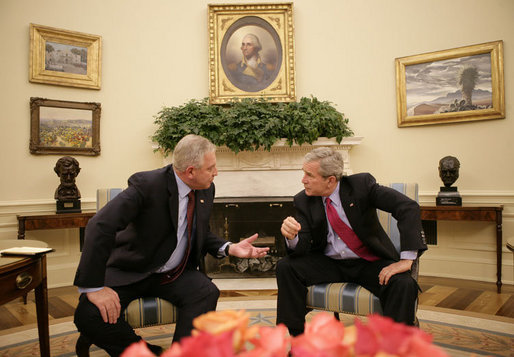

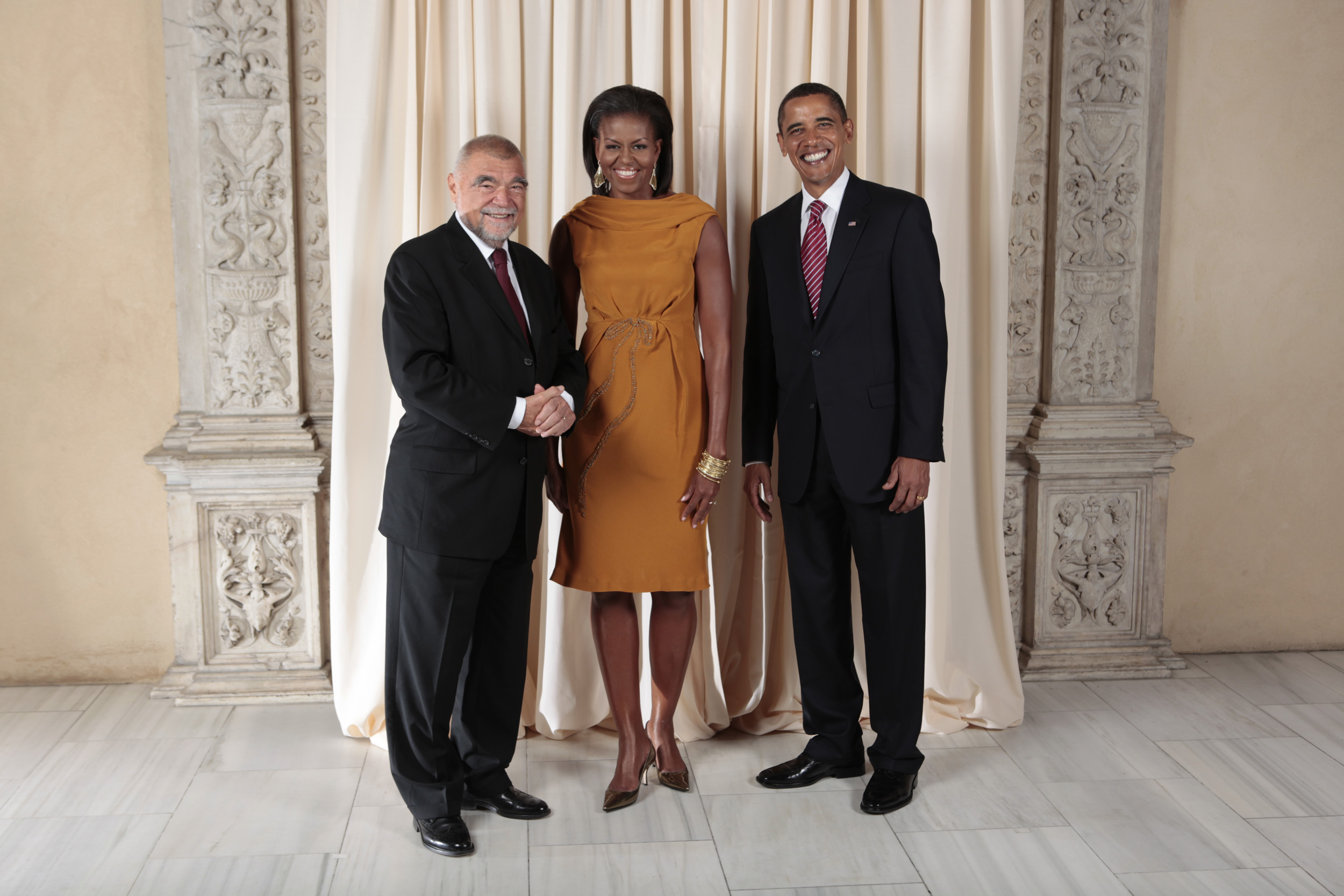

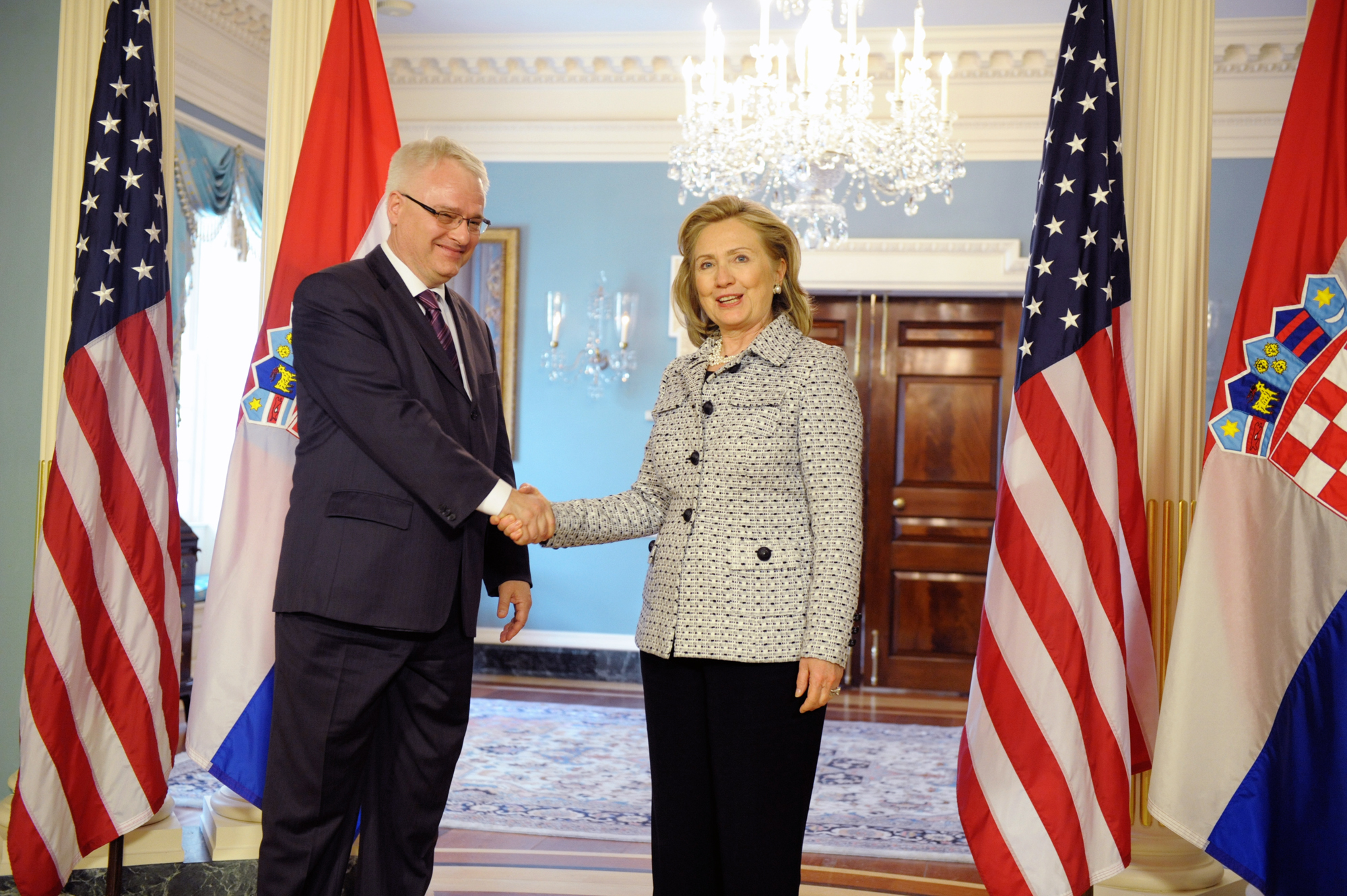

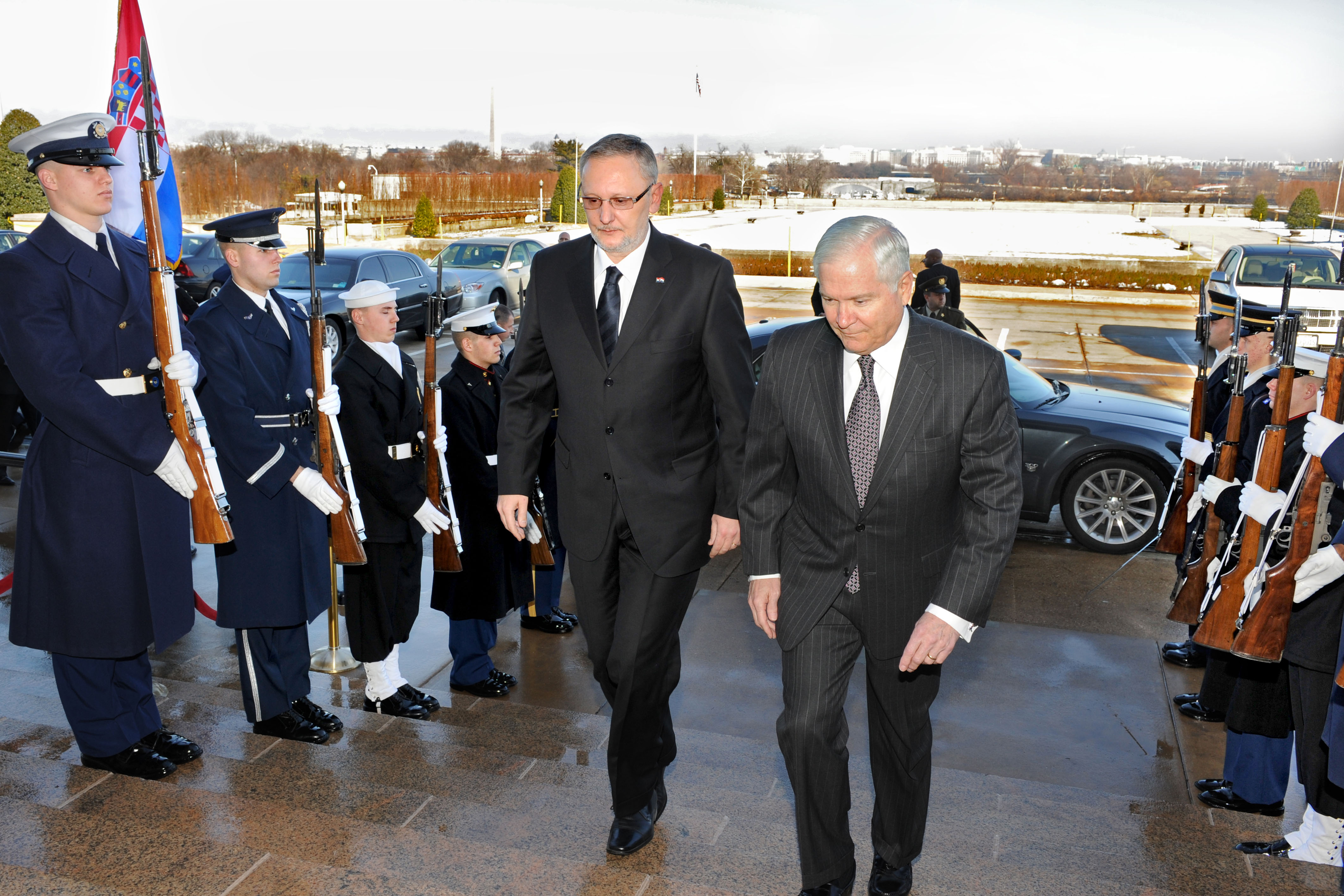

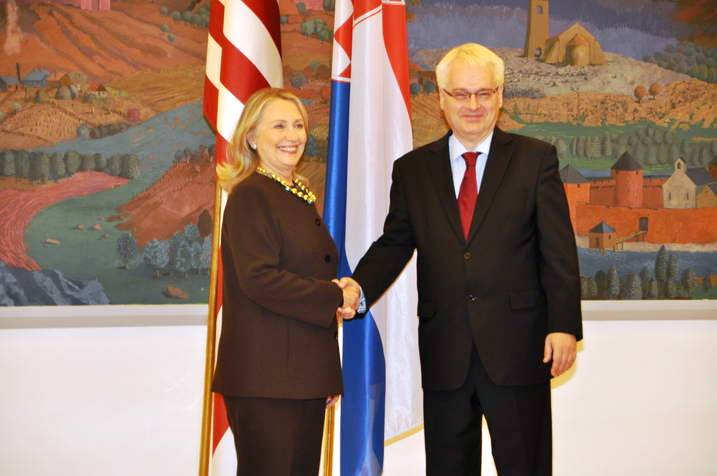

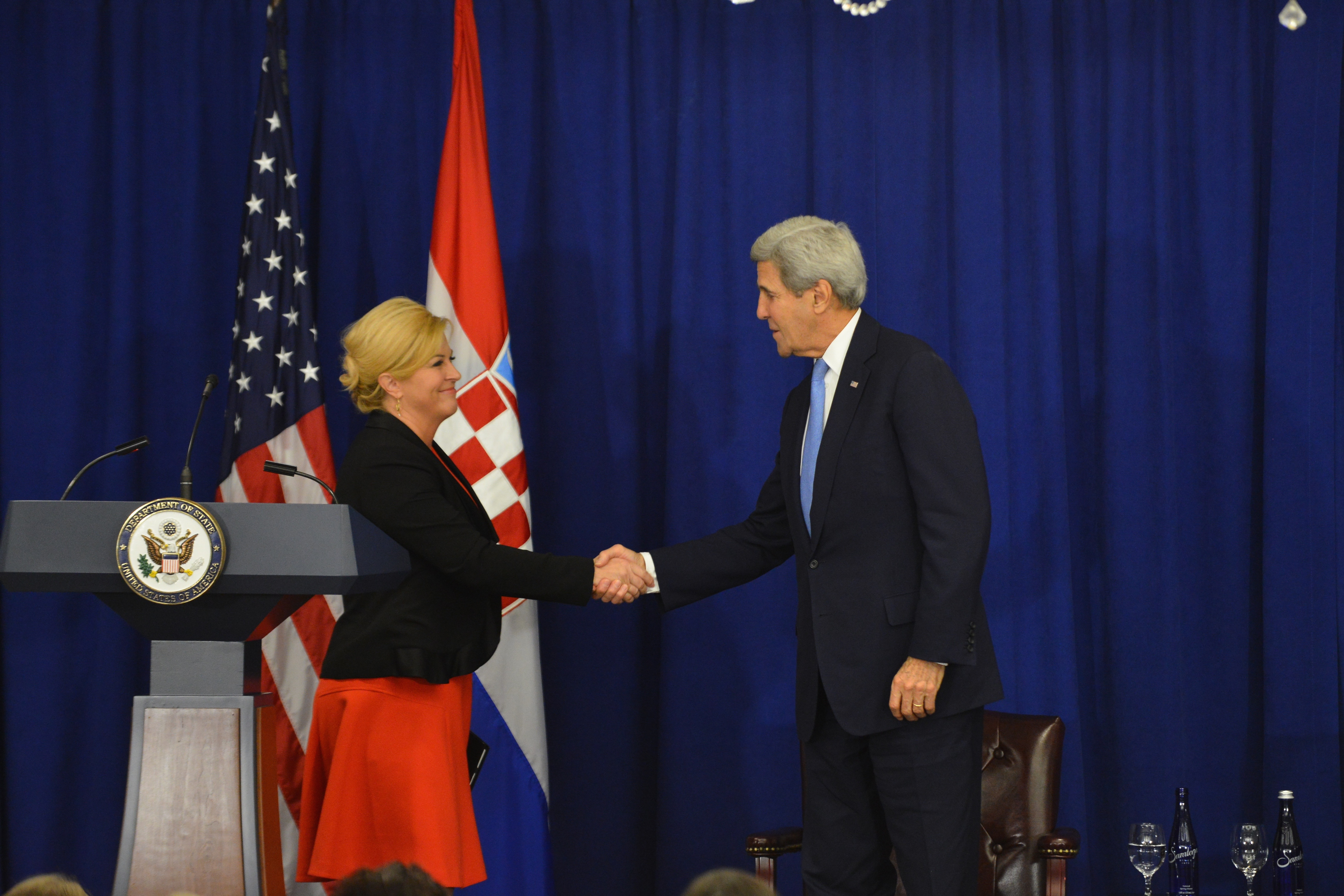

== Cyprus ==
Table of Trips
| Start | End | Guest | Title | Reason |
|---|---|---|---|---|
| June 5, 1962 | June 7, 1962 | Archbishop Makarios III | President | Presidential guest. In U.S. June 2–9, visiting Boston and New York City. |
| October 24, 1970 | October 25, 1970 | Archbishop Makarios III | President | Attended White House dinner on 25th Anniversary of the U.N; met privately with President Nixon October 25. |
| October 5, 1977 | October 5, 1977 | Spyros Kyprianou | President | Met with President Carter in New York City while attending U.N. General Assembly session. |
| October 6, 1978 | October 6, 1978 | Spyros Kyprianou | President | Private visit. |
| December 4, 1981 | December 9, 1981 | Spyros Kyprianou | President | Private visit. Met with President Reagan December 8. |
| October 4, 1989 | October 4, 1989 | George Vassiliou | President | Met with President Bush during a private visit. |
| May 29, 1991 | May 30, 1991 | George Vassiliou | President | Met with President Bush during a private visit. |
| March 30, 1992 | March 30, 1992 | George Vassiliou | President | Met with President Bush during a private visit. |
| May 20, 1993 | May 21, 1993 | Glafkos Klerides | President | Met with President Clinton during a private visit. |
| June 16, 1996 | June 18, 1996 | Glafkos Klerides | President | Working visit. |
| October 30, 2024 | October 31, 2024 | Nikos Christodoulides | President | Official Visit. |

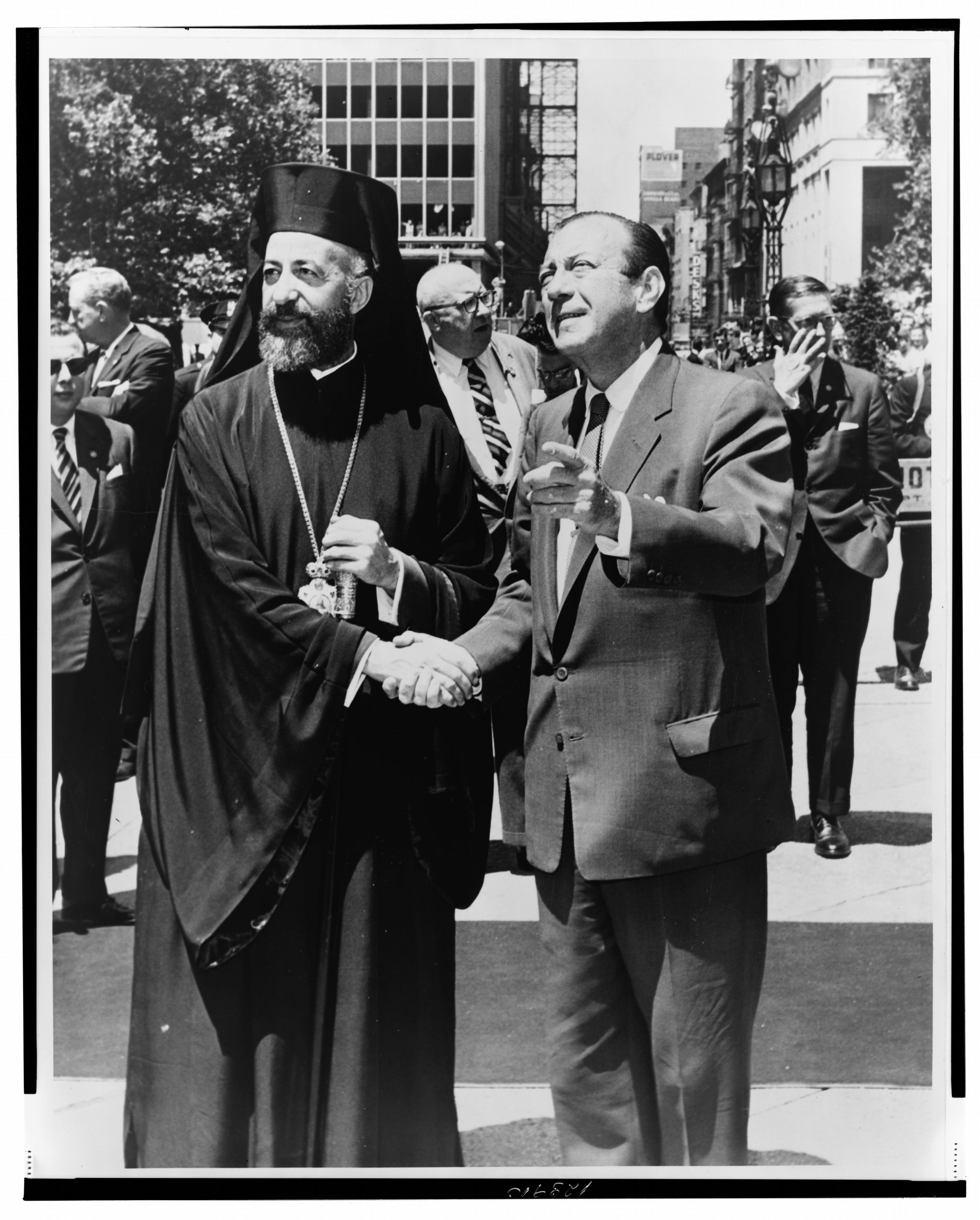

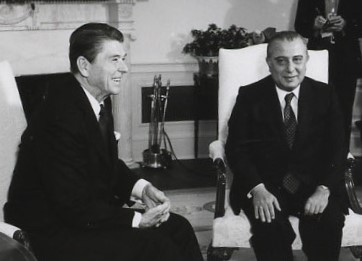

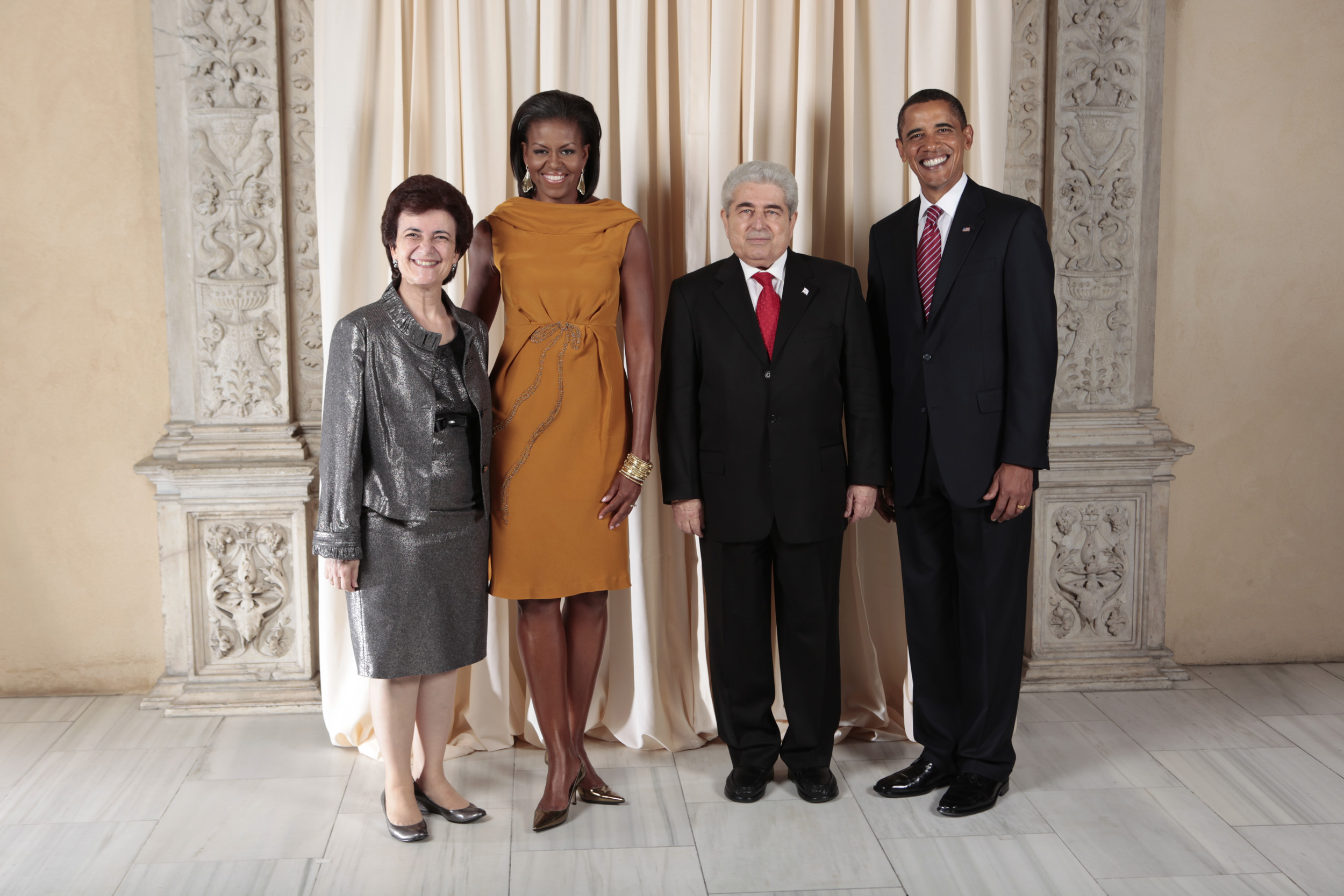

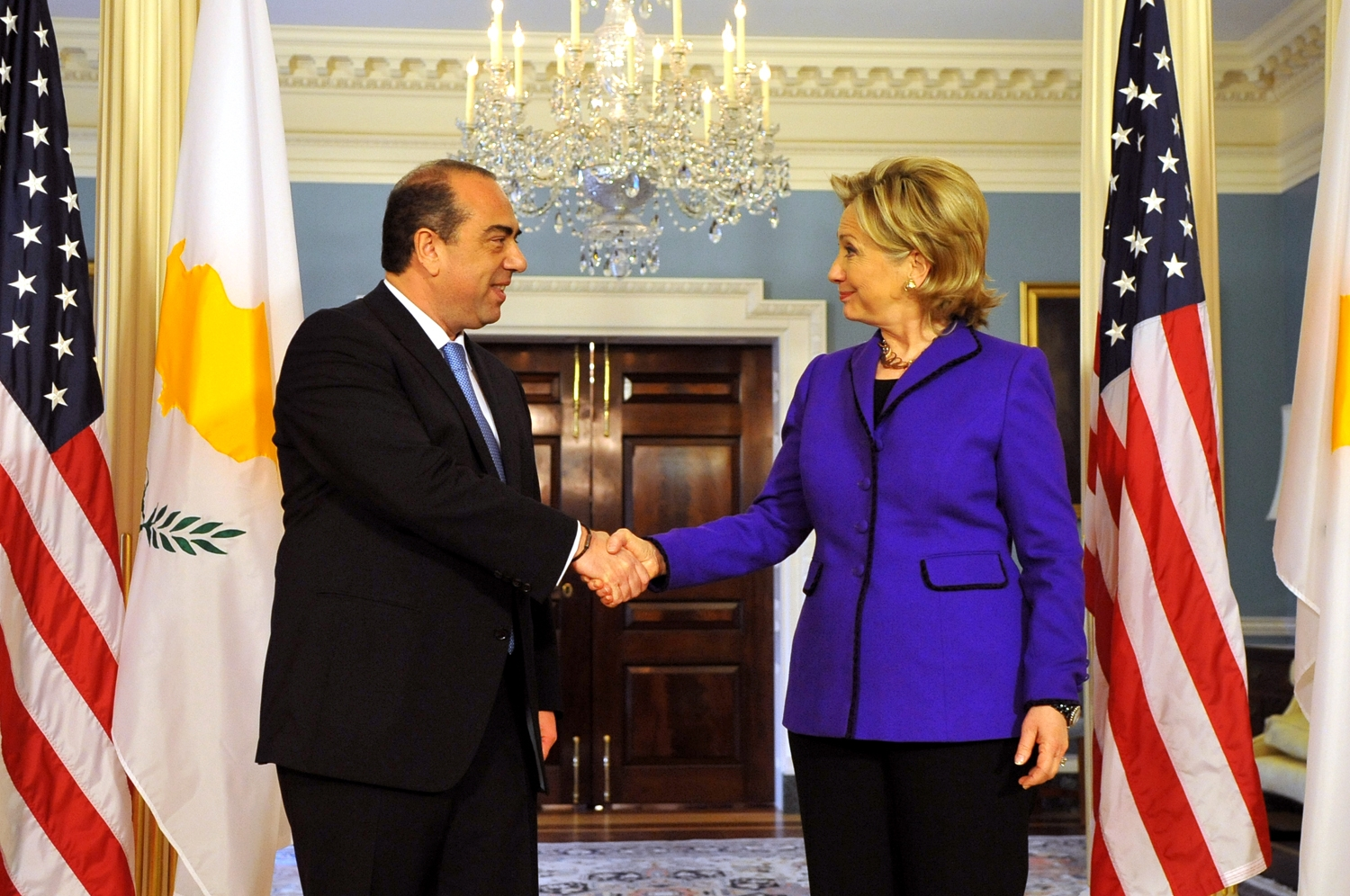

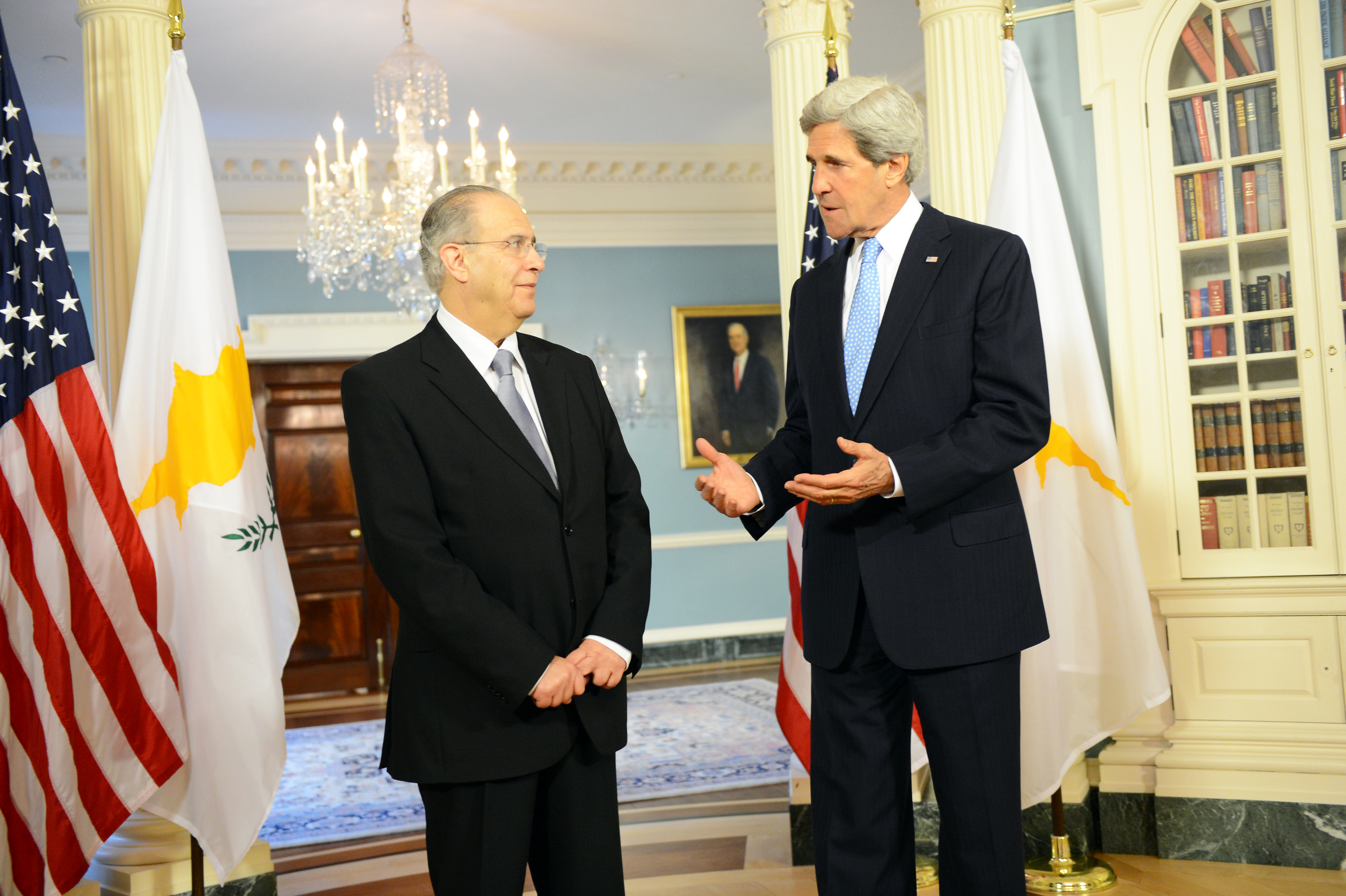

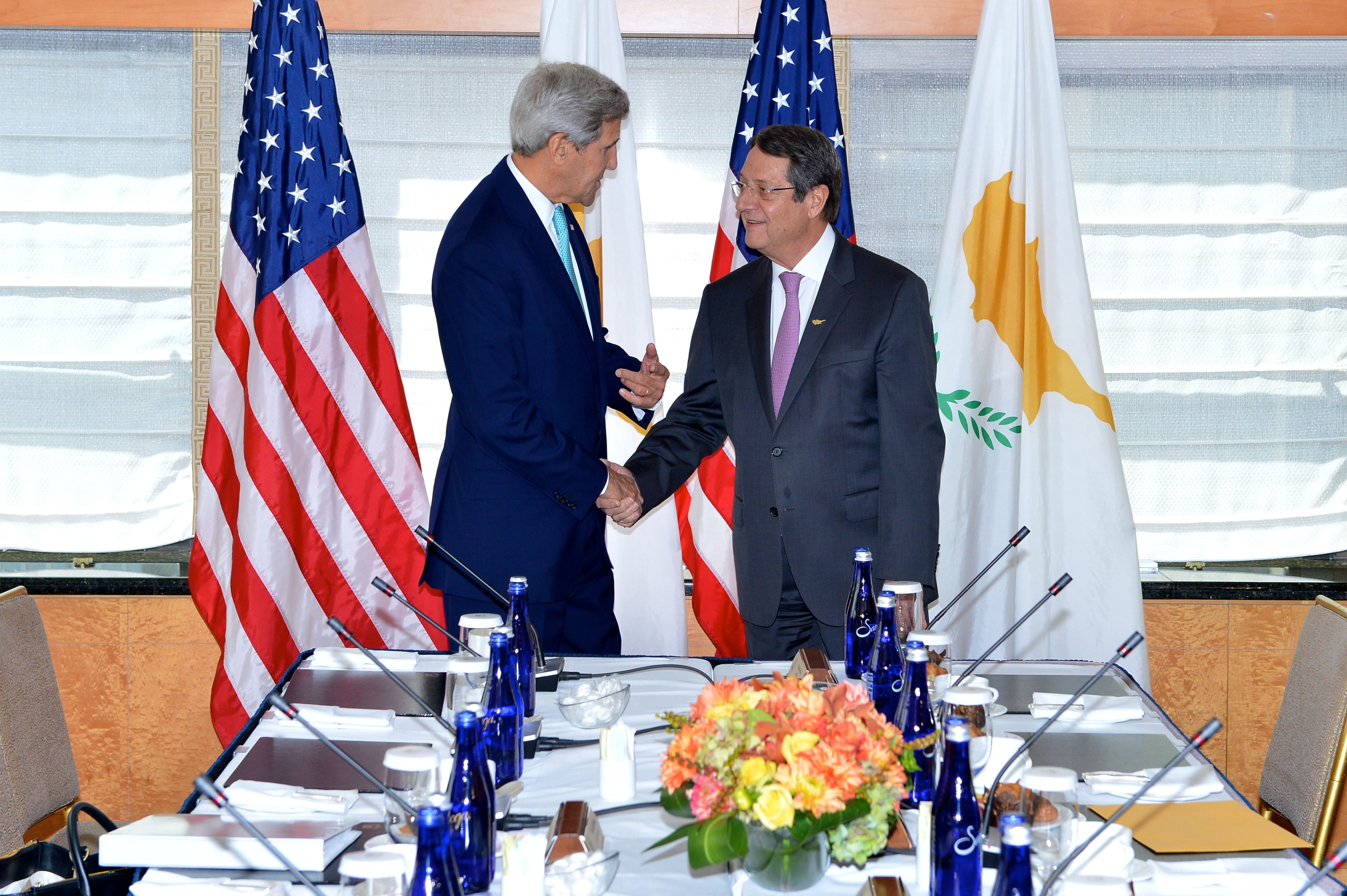

== Czechoslovakia ==
Table of Trips
| Start | End | Guest | Title | Reason |
|---|---|---|---|---|
| May 12, 1943 | May 19, 1943 | Edvard Beneš (government-in-exile) | President | Guest of the President. Addressed U.S. Senate. Also visited Chicago, New York City, and Fort Knox.Revisited Washington, D.C. May 29–30. Left U.S. June 7. |
| February 19, 1990 | February 21, 1990 | Václav Havel | President | Official working visit. Addressed Joint Meeting of Congress February 21. Private visit to New York City afterward. |
| September 30, 1990 | September 30, 1990 | Václav Havel | President | Met with President Bush at the U.N. General Assembly. |
| October 24, 1991 | October 24, 1991 | Václav Havel | President | State Visit. Private visit to Los Angeles afterwards. |
| April 10, 1992 | April 10, 1992 | Marián Čalfa | Prime Minister | Met with President Bush during a private visit. |

== Czech Republic ==
Table of Trips
| Start | End | Guest | Title | Reason |
|---|---|---|---|---|
| April 20, 1993 | April 22, 1993 | Václav Havel | President | Attended dedication of the Holocaust Memorial Museum and met with President Clinton on April 21. |
| May 3, 1995 | May 5, 1995 | Václav Klaus | Prime Minister | Working visit. |
| October 21, 1995 | October 21, 1995 | Václav Havel | President | Attended dedication of the National Czech & Slovak Museum & Library in Cedar Rapids |
| September 30, 1996 | October 1, 1996 | Václav Klaus | Prime Minister | Met with President Clinton during a private visit. |
| September 15, 1998 | September 18, 1998 | Václav Havel | President | State Visit. |
| April 23, 1999 | April 25, 1999 | Václav Havel | President | Attended NATO's 50th Anniversary Summit. |
| November 7, 1999 | November 9, 1999 | Miloš Zeman | Prime Minister | Working visit. |
| November 7, 2001 | November 10, 2001 | Miloš Zeman | Prime Minister | Met with President Bush November 9 during a private visit. |
| September 17, 2002 | September 19, 2002 | Václav Havel | President | Working visit. Also dedicated a monument to President Thomas Masaryk. |
| July 14, 2003 | July 17, 2003 | Vladimír Špidla | Prime Minister | Working visit. |
| June 11, 2004 | June 11, 2004 | Václav Klaus | President | Attended the funeral of Former President Reagan. |
| March 8, 2005 | March 8, 2005 | Václav Klaus | President | Working visit |
| February 25, 2008 | February 28, 2008 | Mirek Topolánek | Prime Minister | Working visit |
| April 12, 2010 | April 13, 2010 | Jan Fischer | Prime Minister | Attended the Nuclear Security Summit. |
| October 27, 2011 | October 27, 2011 | Petr Nečas | Prime Minister | Working visit. |
| May 20, 2012 | May 21, 2012 | Václav Klaus | President | Attended the NATO Summit meeting in Chicago. |
| November 17, 2014 | November 17, 2014 | Bohuslav Sobotka | Prime Minister | Working visit. |
| March 31, 2016 | April 1, 2016 | Bohuslav Sobotka | Prime Minister | Attended the Nuclear Security Summit. |
| March 6, 2019 | March 8, 2019 | Andrej Babiš | Prime Minister | Working visit. |
| April 15, 2024 | April 15, 2024 | Petr Fiala | Prime Minister | Working visit. |
| July 10, 2024 | July 11, 2024 | Petr Pavel | President | Attended NATO 75th Anniversary Summit in Washington, D.C. |

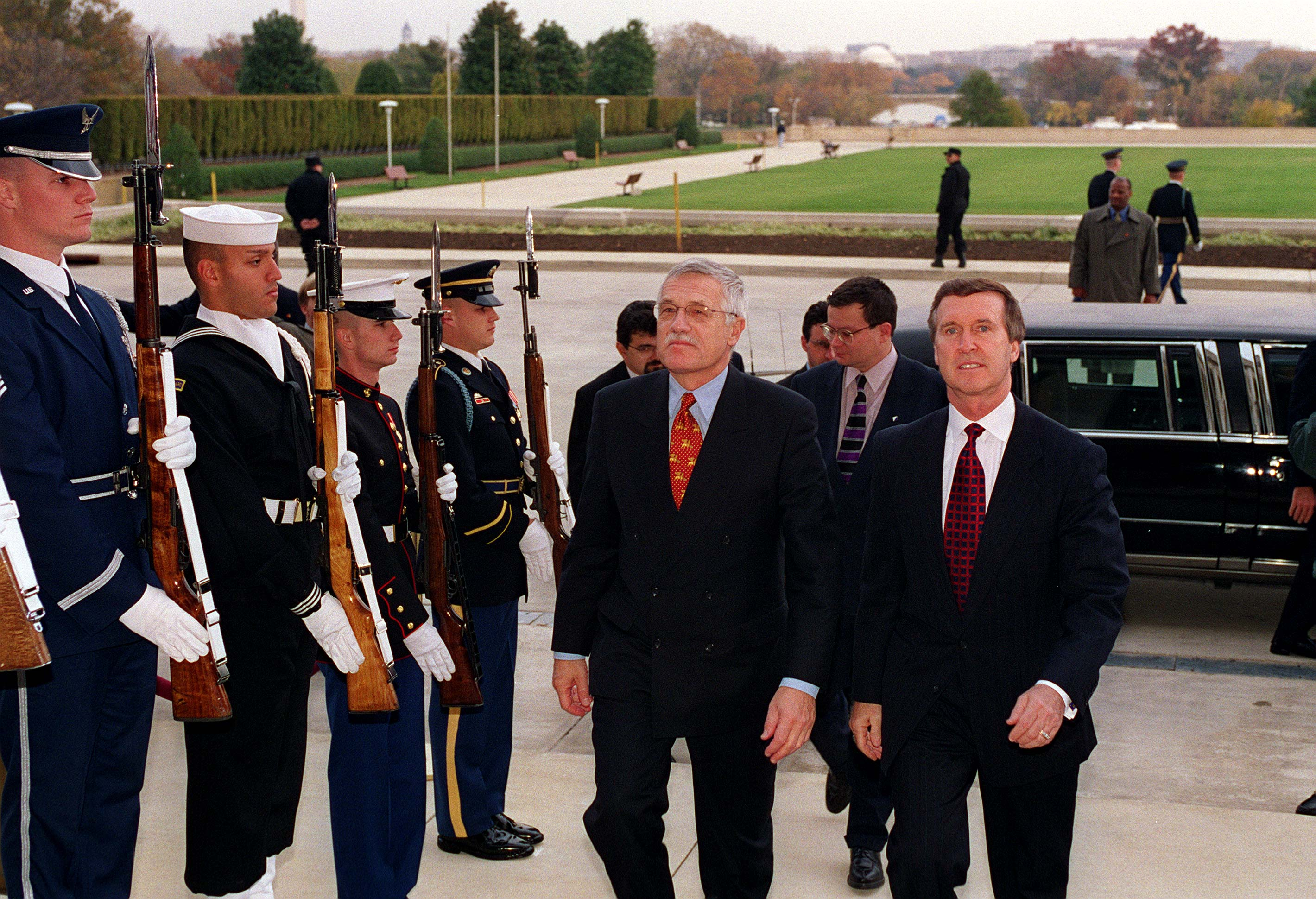

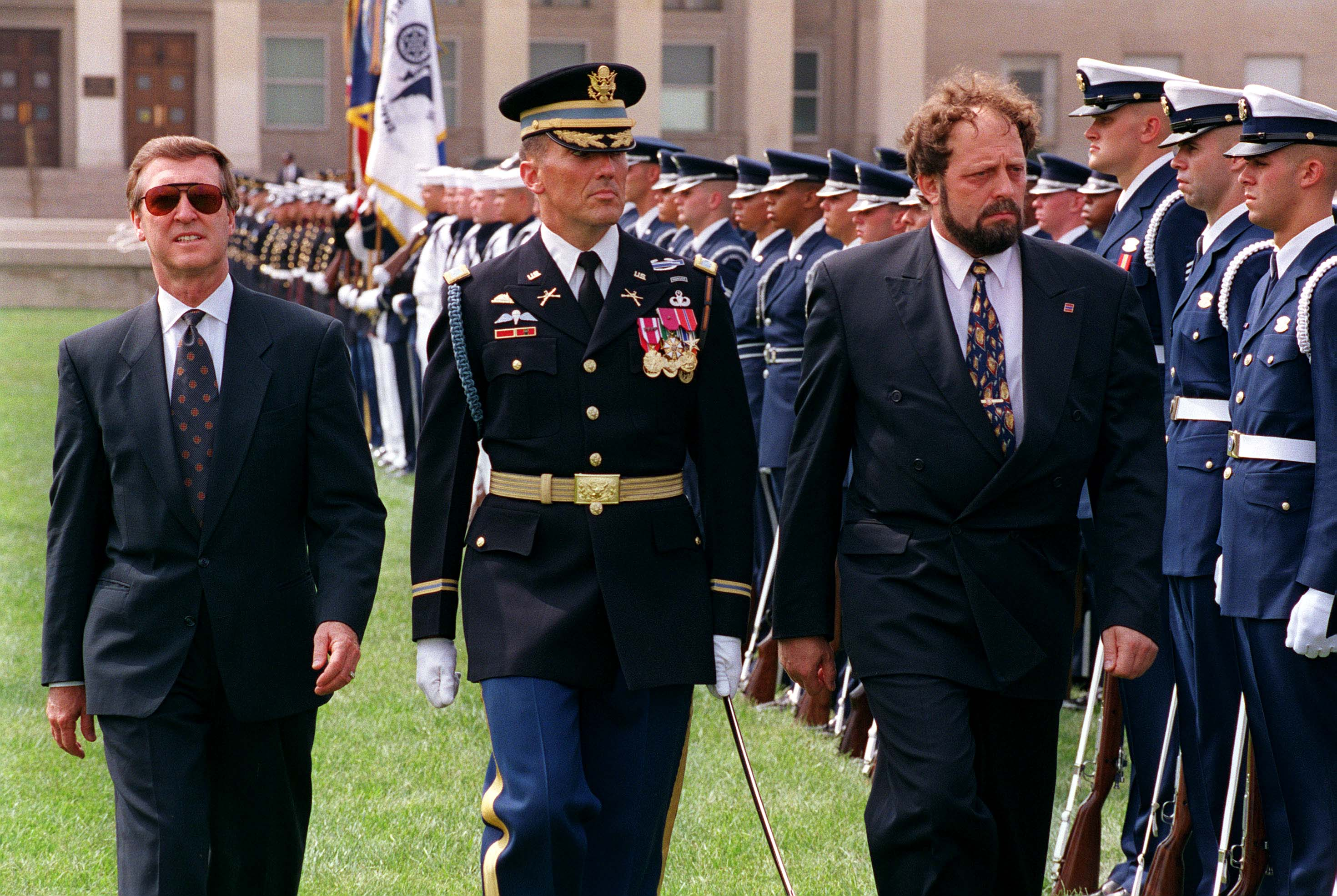

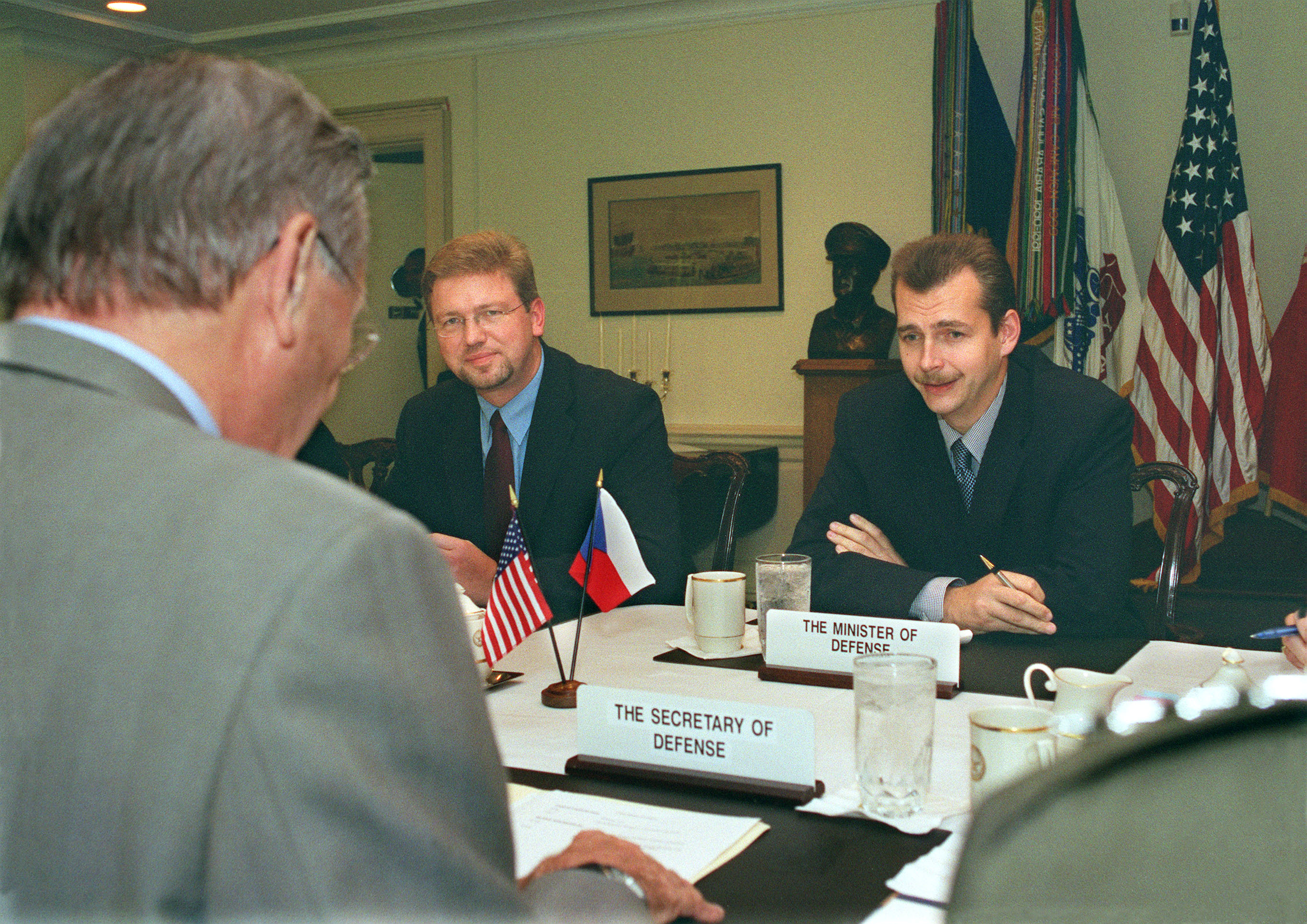

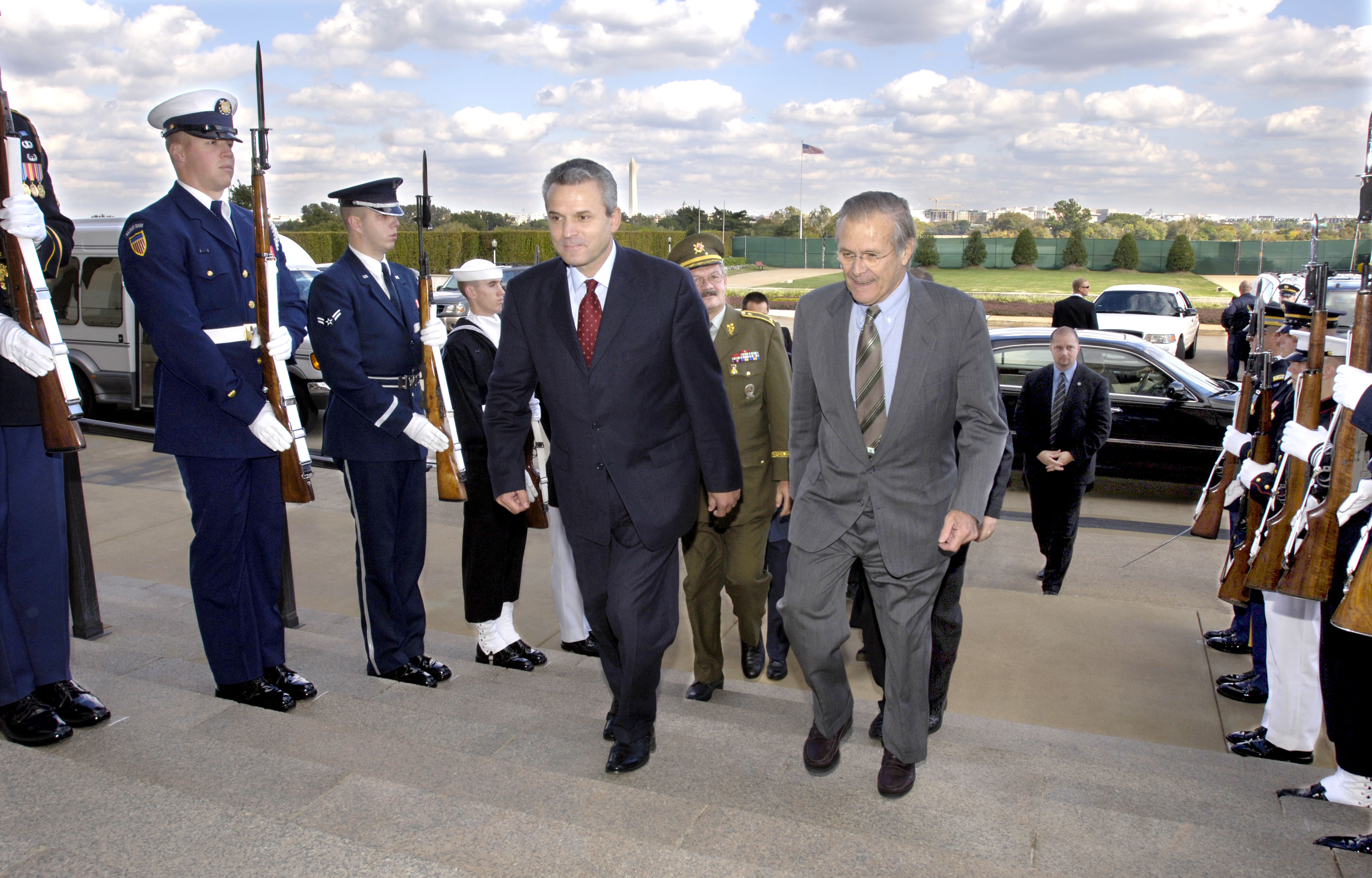

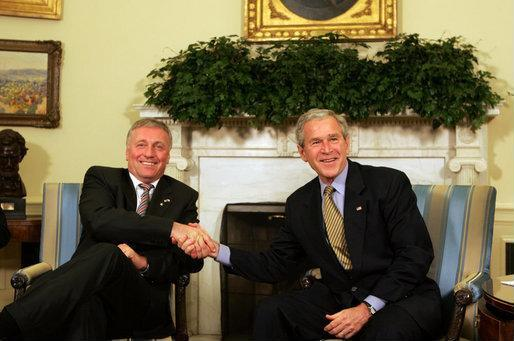

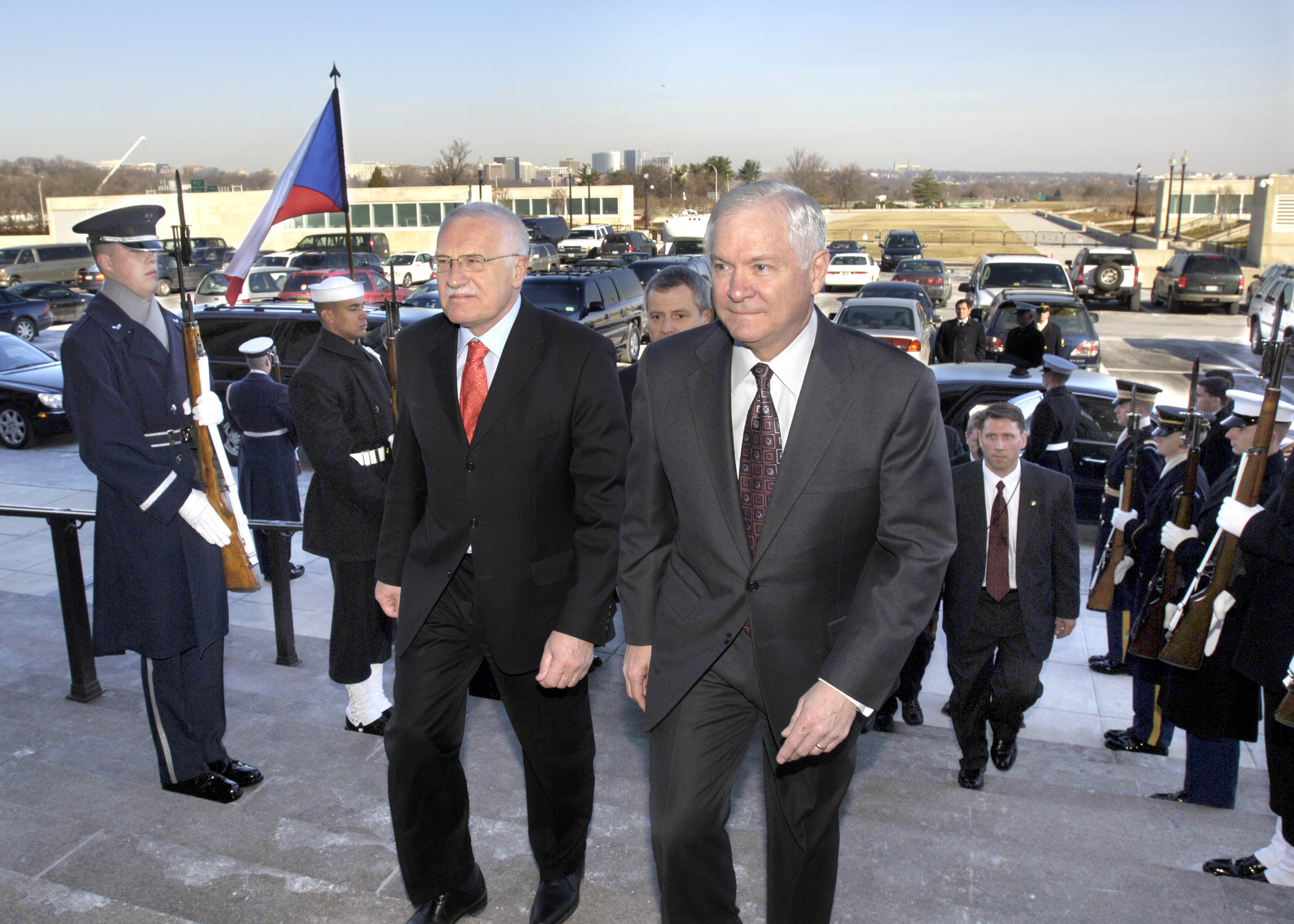

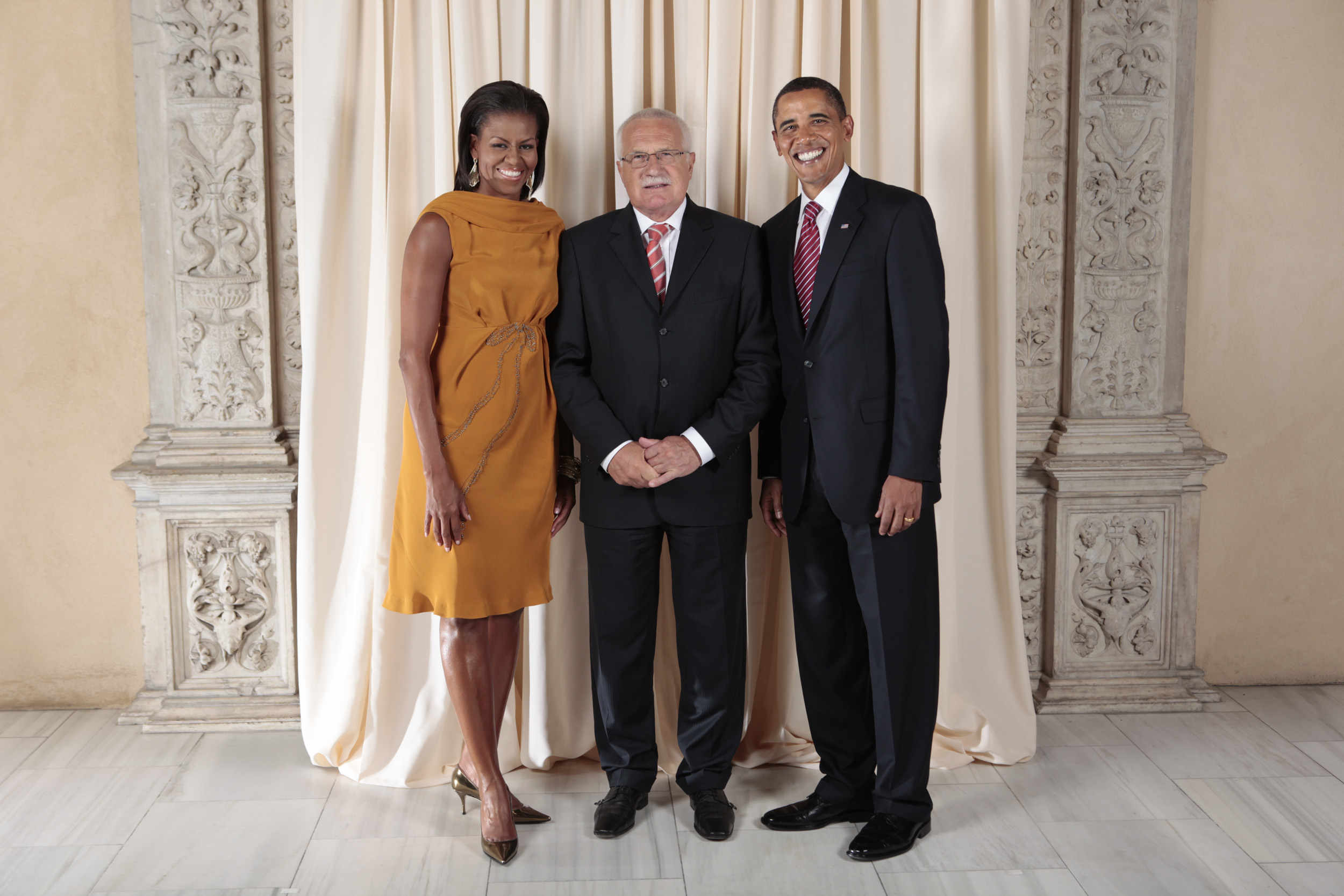

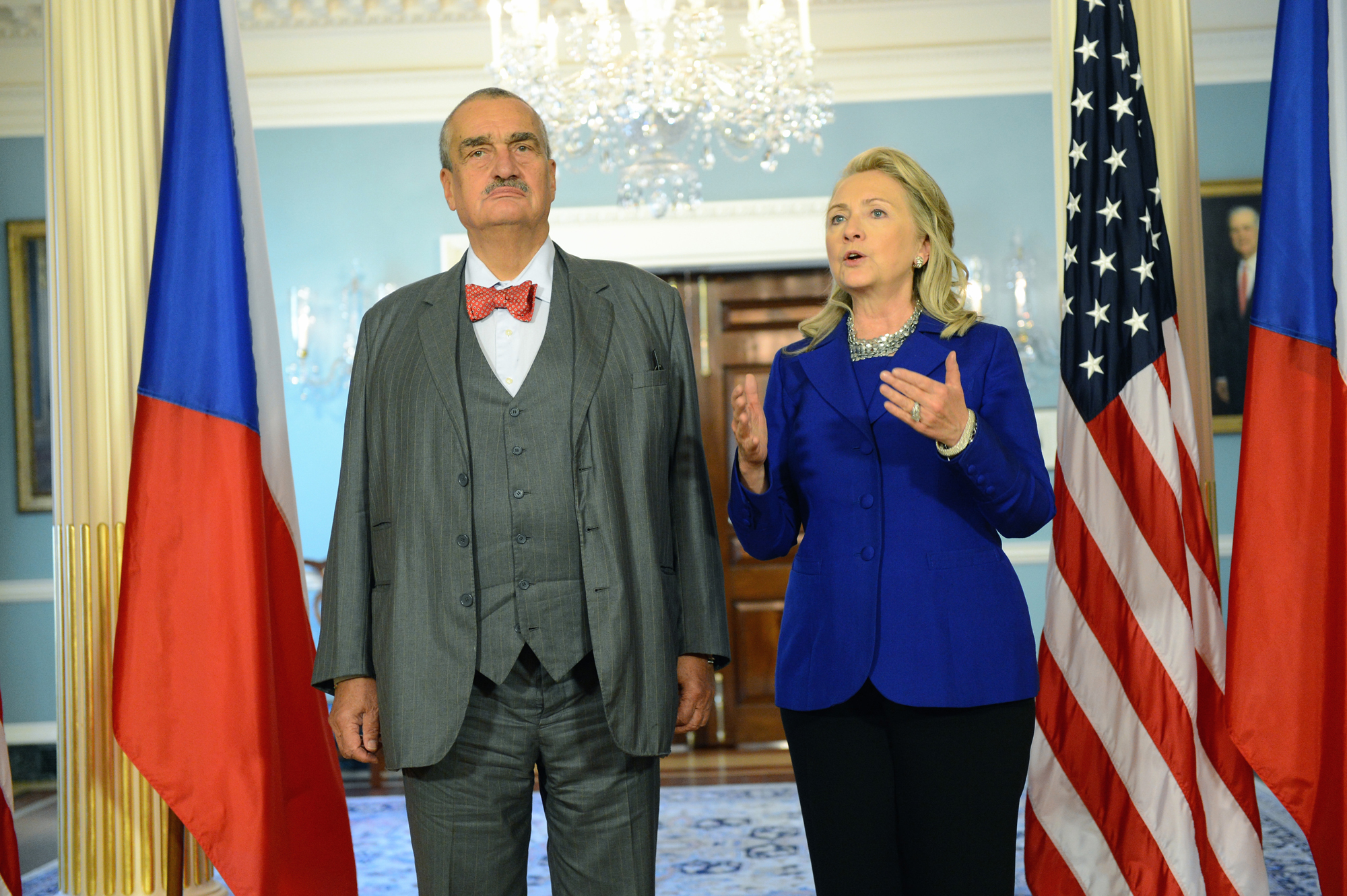

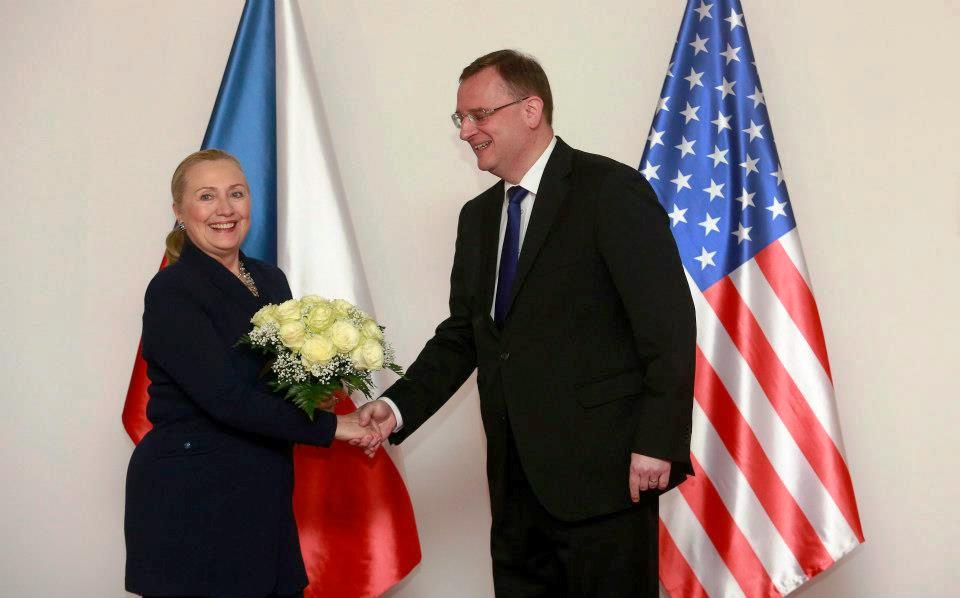

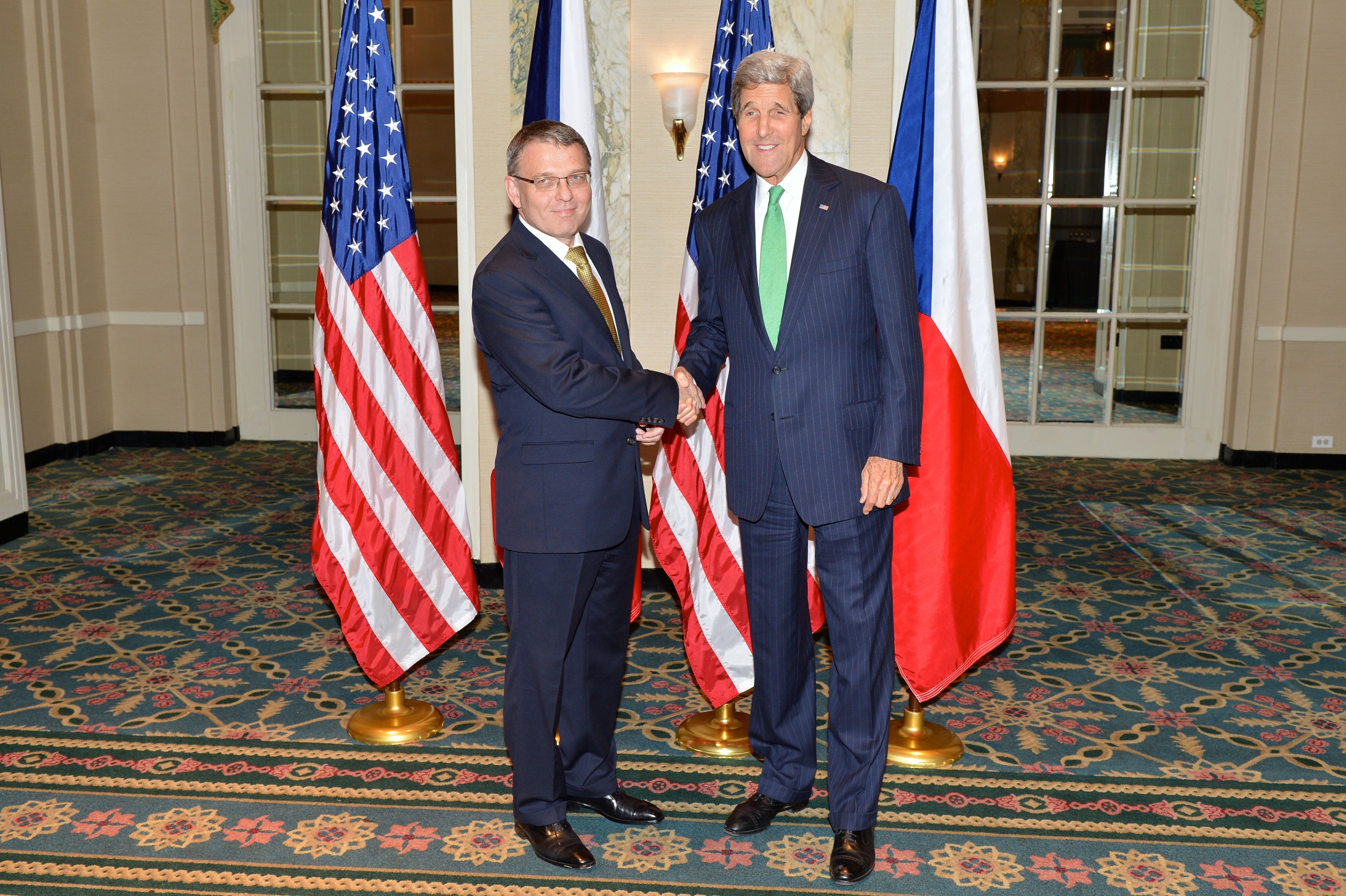

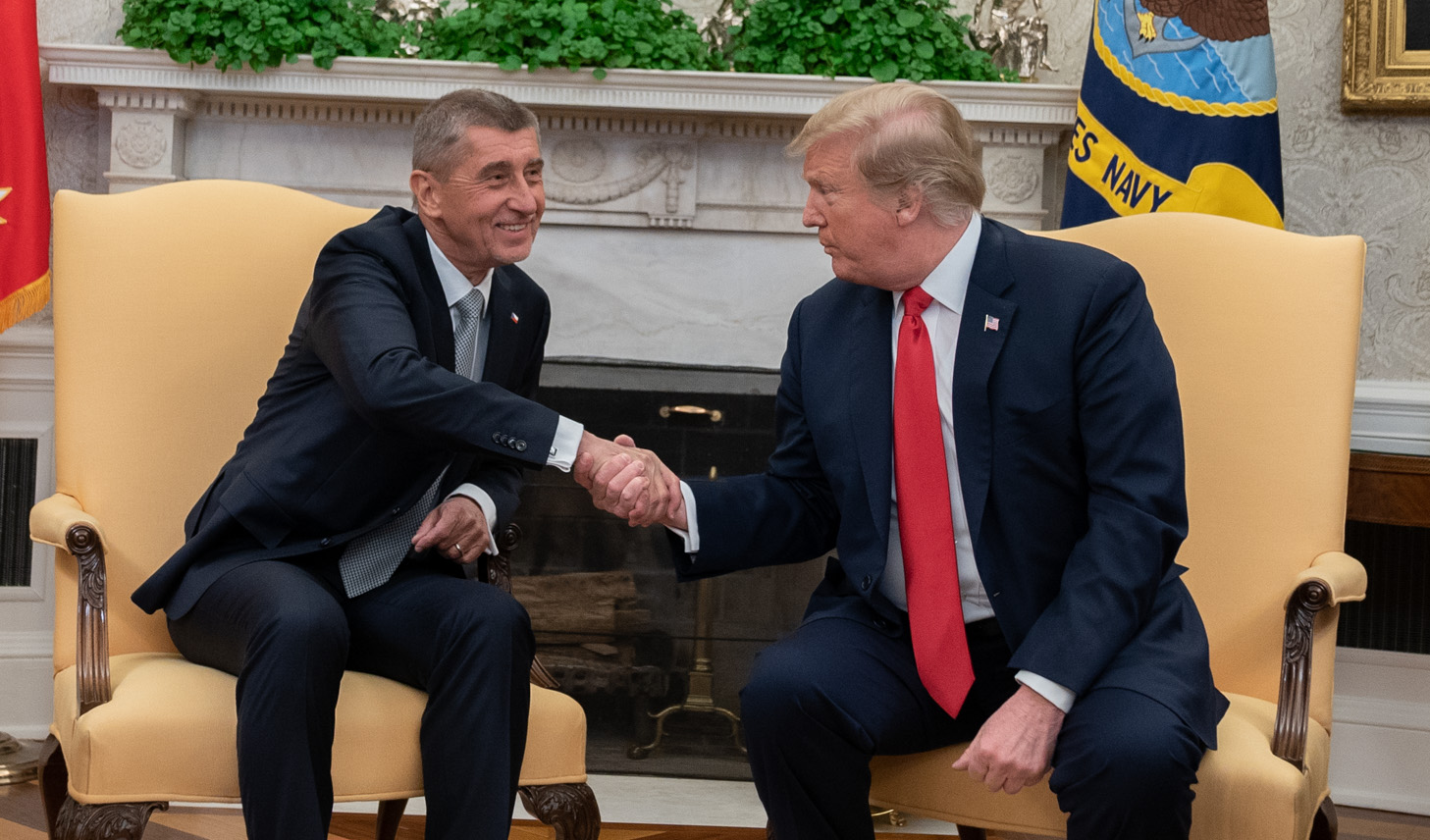

== Denmark ==
Table of Trips
| Start | End | Guest | Title | Reason |
|---|---|---|---|---|
| November 23, 1954 | November 26, 1954 | Hans Hedtoft | Prime Minister | Trans-Arctic flight to Los Angeles by Scandinavian Airlines. Met with President Eisenhower November 24. |
| May 8, 1958 | May 14, 1958 | Hans Hedtoft | Prime Minister | Unofficial visit; attended Minnesota Statehood Centennial in Minneapolis and St. Paul |
| October 11, 1960 | October 14, 1960 | Frederik IX | King | State visit. In U.S. October 4–17, visiting Los Angeles, San Francisco, Chicago, New York City, and Albany. |
| February 14, 1961 | February 15, 1961 | Viggo Kampmann | Prime Minister | Informal visit. In U.S. February 11–19, visiting New York City, Mystic, Chicago, and San Francisco. |
| November 24, 1963 | November 25, 1963 | Jens Otto Krag | Prime Minister | Attended funeral of President Kennedy. |
| June 9, 1964 | June 12, 1964 | Jens Otto Krag | Prime Minister | Private visit. |
| April 22, 1966 | April 27, 1966 | Jens Otto Krag | Prime Minister | Private visit. Arrived in U.S. April 20; visited New York City and Omaha. Met with President Johnson April 27. |
| June 22, 1967 | June 22, 1967 | Jens Otto Krag | Prime Minister | Informal visit. Discussed the Middle East crisis with President Johnson. |
| September 27, 1967 | September 27, 1967 | Jens Otto Krag | Prime Minister | Informal visit. |
| April 14, 1970 | April 16, 1970 | Hilmar Baunsgaard | Prime Minister | Official visit. In U.S. April 12–19; visited Williamsburg, and afterwards made a private visit to New York City. |
| October 24, 1970 | October 24, 1970 | Hilmar Baunsgaard | Prime Minister | Attended White House dinner on 25th Anniversary of the U.N. |
| November 13, 1975 | November 13, 1975 | Anker Jørgensen | Prime Minister | Private visit. |
| May 10, 1976 | May 11, 1976 | Margrethe II | Queen | Luncheon at the White House during a private visit |
| February 21, 1978 | February 23, 1978 | Anker Jørgensen | Prime Minister | Official visit. Private visit afterwards to Colorado, California, and Washington state. |
| May 30, 1978 | May 31, 1978 | Anker Jørgensen | Prime Minister | Attended NATO summit conference. |
| December 12, 1982 | December 14, 1982 | Poul Schlüter | Prime Minister | Official working visit. |
| September 9, 1985 | September 11, 1985 | Poul Schlüter | Prime Minister | Official Visit. |
| August 28, 1989 | August 28, 1989 | Poul Schlüter | Prime Minister | Met with President Bush during a private visit to Kennebunkport |
| February 19, 1991 | February 22, 1991 | Margrethe II | Queen | State Visit. Private visit to New York City afterward. |
| May 6, 1993 | May 7, 1993 | Poul Nyrup Rasmussen | Prime Minister | Accompanied EEC President Jacques Delors to discuss the Bosnian crisis with President Clinton. |
| April 23, 1999 | April 25, 1999 | Poul Nyrup Rasmussen | Prime Minister | Attended NATO's 50th Anniversary Summit. |
| March 25, 2002 | March 25, 2002 | Anders Fogh Rasmussen | Prime Minister | Met with President Bush during a private visit. |
| May 12, 2003 | May 12, 2003 | Anders Fogh Rasmussen | Prime Minister | Working visit. |
| May 27, 2004 | May 28, 2004 | Anders Fogh Rasmussen | Prime Minister | Working visit. |
| May 20, 2005 | May 20, 2005 | Anders Fogh Rasmussen | Prime Minister | Working visit. |
| June 8, 2006 | June 11, 2006 | Anders Fogh Rasmussen | Prime Minister | Working visit. Met with President Bush at Camp David. Later visited San Francisco and Sacramento; and Seattle. Departed the U.S. June 13. |
| February 27, 2008 | March 1, 2008 | Anders Fogh Rasmussen | Prime Minister | Working visit. Met with President Bush in Crawford |
| March 14, 2011 | March 14, 2011 | Lars Løkke Rasmussen | Prime Minister | Working visit. |
| February 24, 2012 | February 24, 2012 | Helle Thorning-Schmidt | Prime Minister | Working visit. |
| May 20, 2012 | May 21, 2012 | Helle Thorning-Schmidt | Prime Minister | Attended the NATO Summit Meeting in Chicago. |
| March 31, 2016 | April 1, 2016 | Lars Løkke Rasmussen | Prime Minister | Attended the Nuclear Security Summit. |
| May 13, 2016 | May 13, 2016 | Lars Løkke Rasmussen | Prime Minister | Attended the U.S.-Nordic Leaders Summit. |
| March 30, 2017 | March 30, 2017 | Lars Løkke Rasmussen | Prime Minister | Working Visit. |
| June 5, 2023 | June 5, 2023 | Mette Frederiksen | Prime Minister | Working Visit. |
| July 10, 2024 | July 11, 2024 | Mette Frederiksen | Prime Minister | Attended NATO 75th Anniversary Summit in Washington, D.C. |

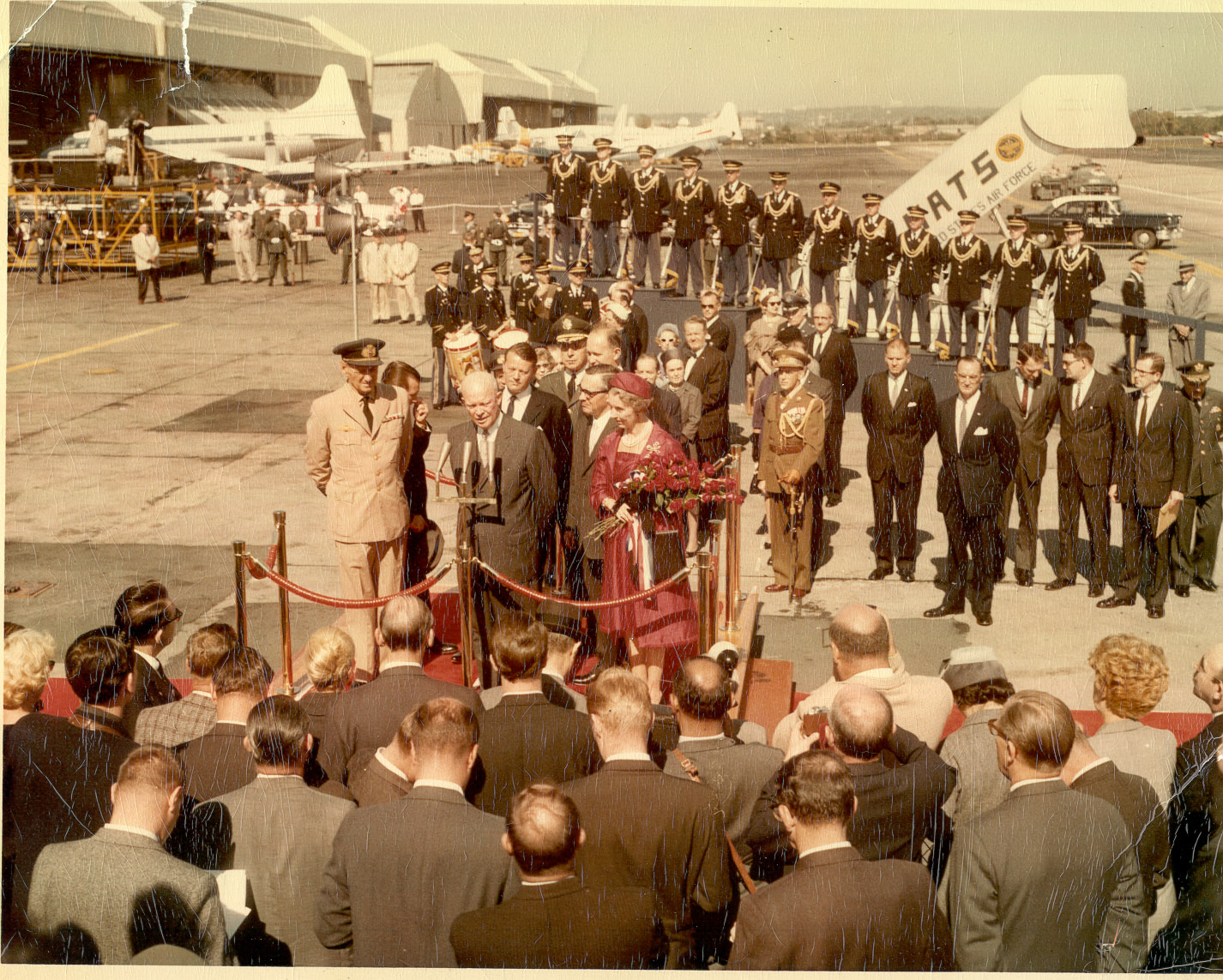

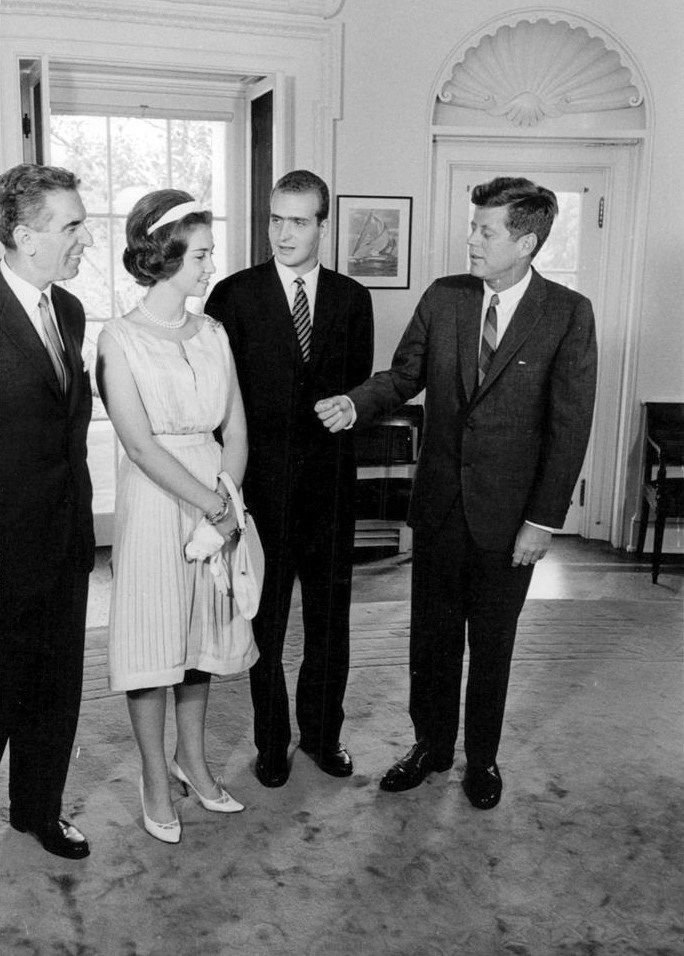

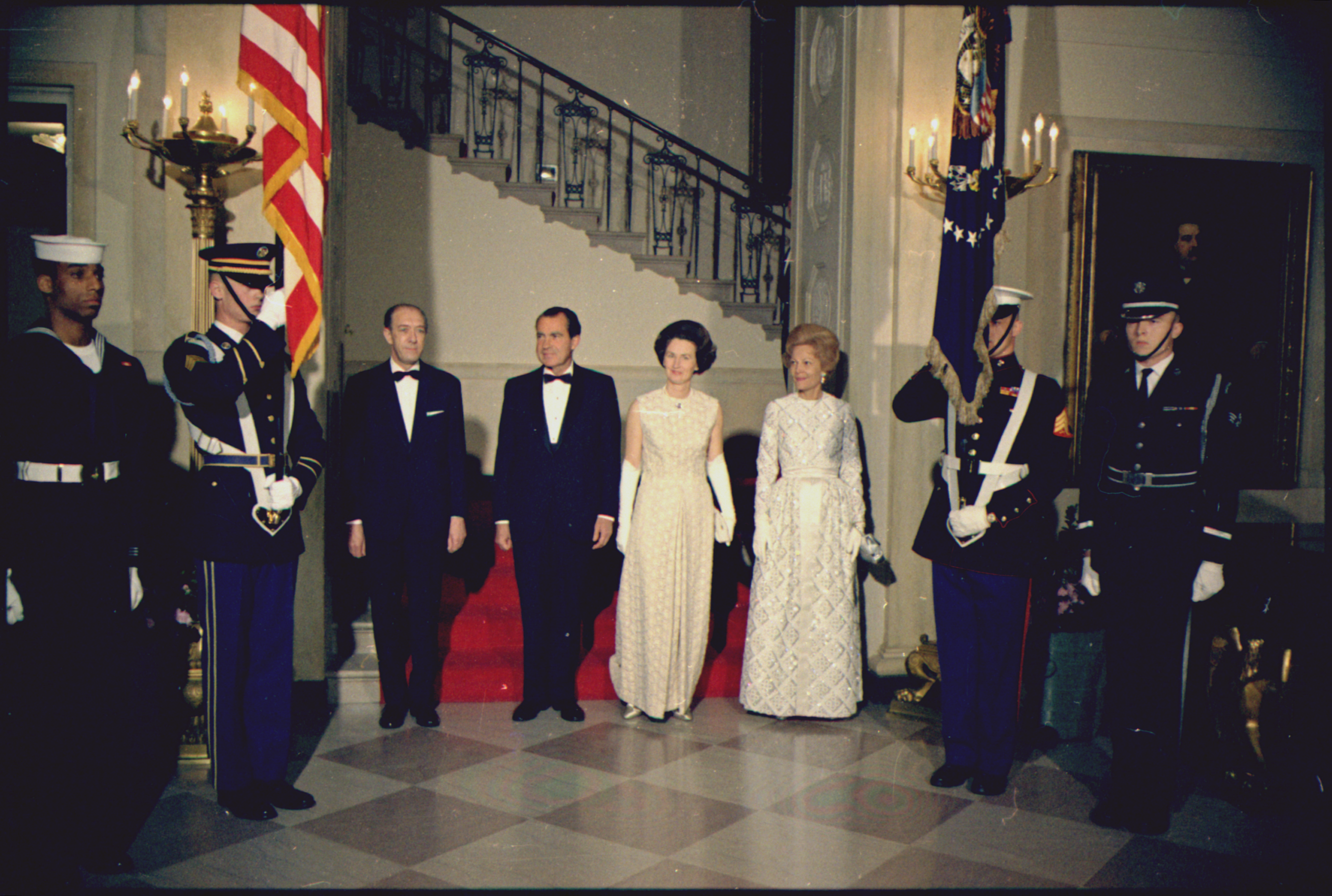

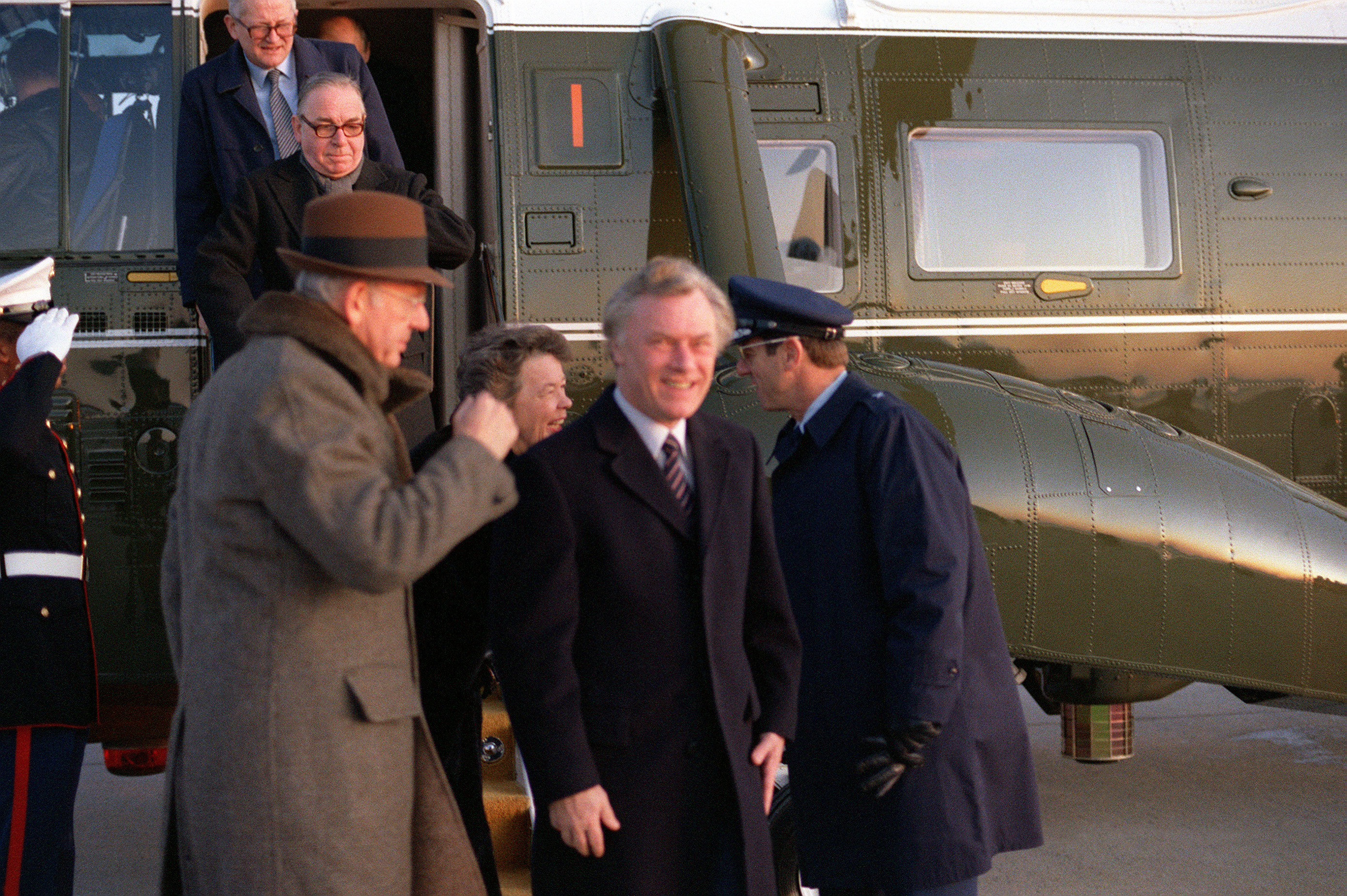

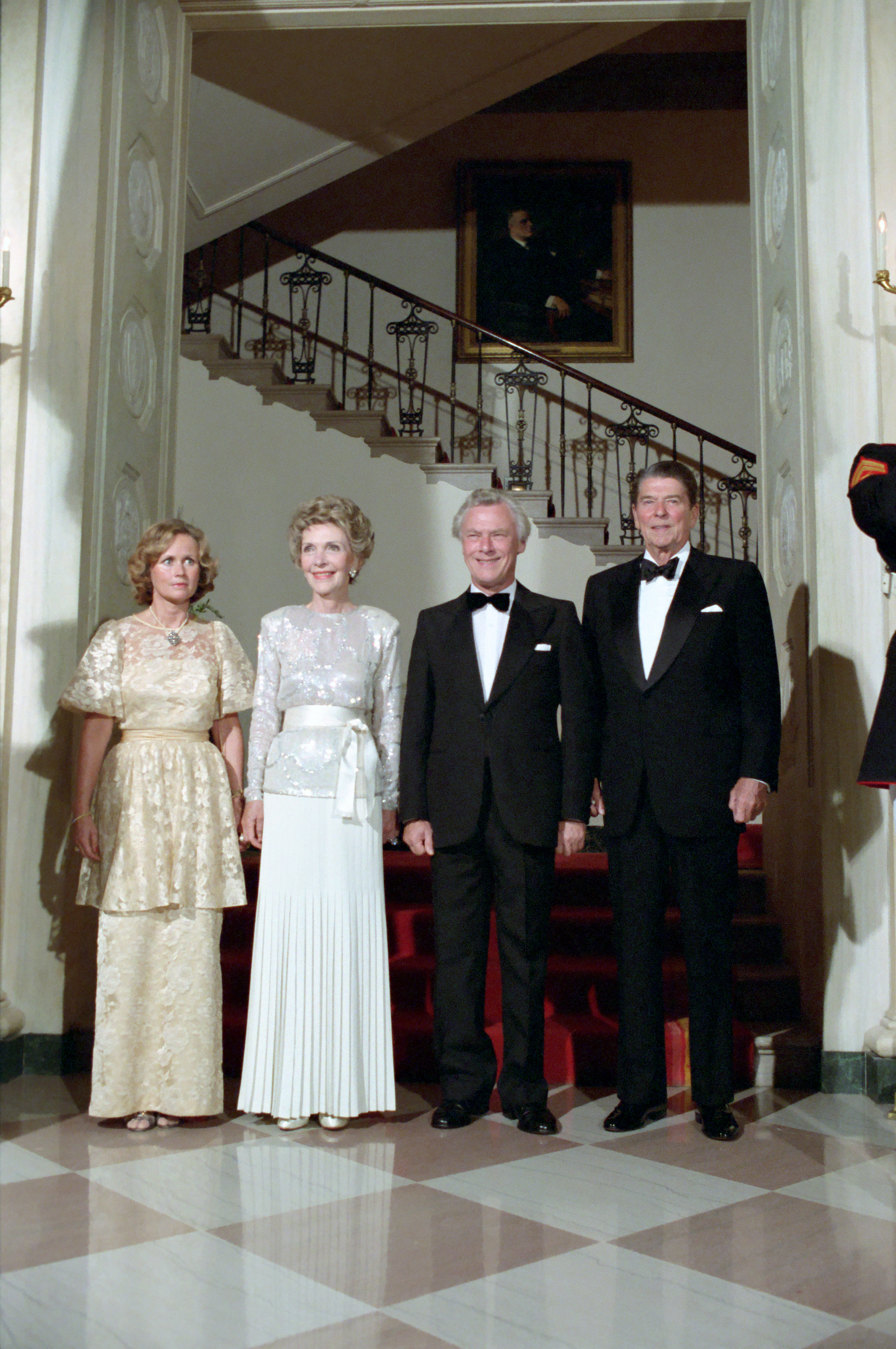

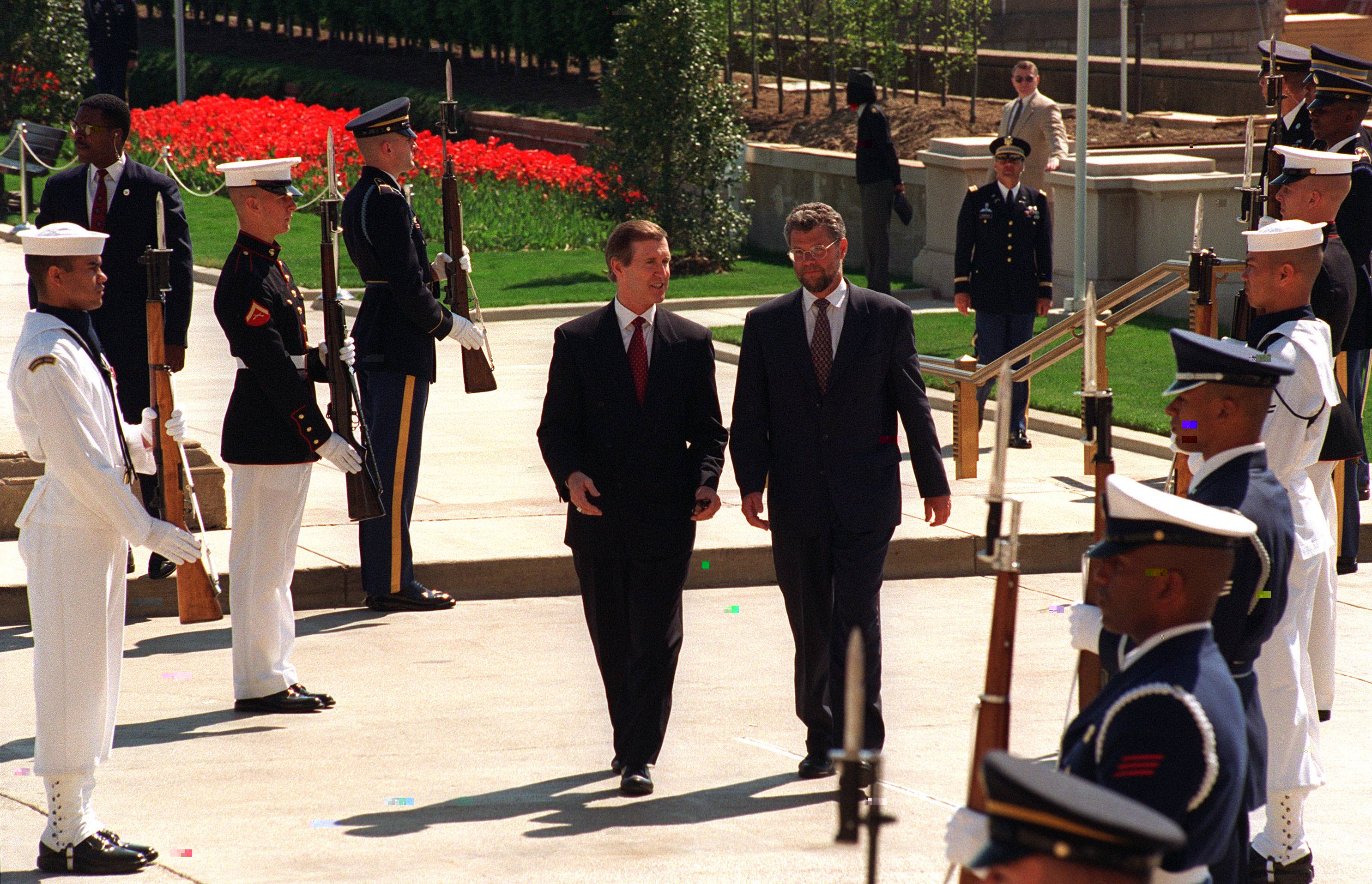

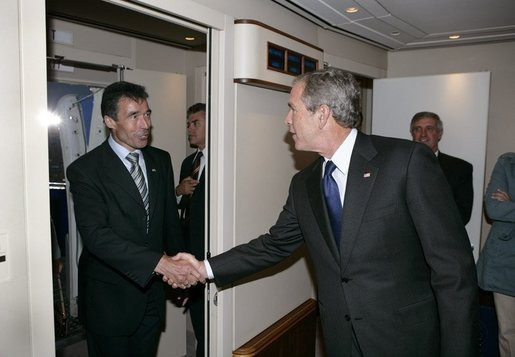

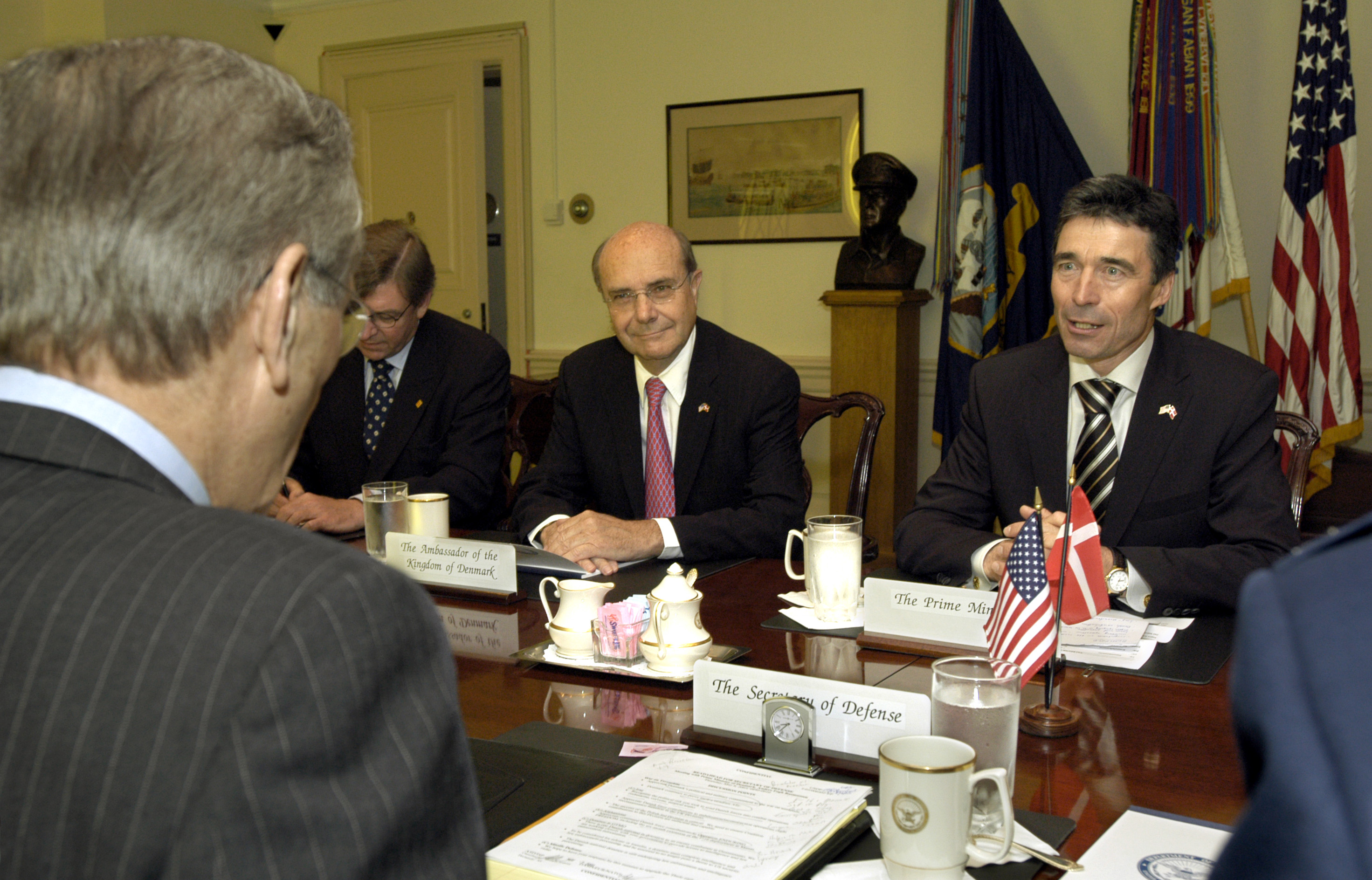

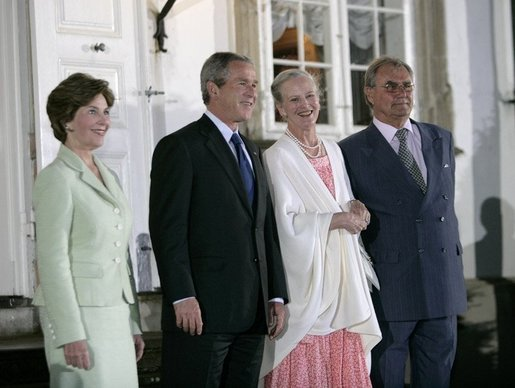

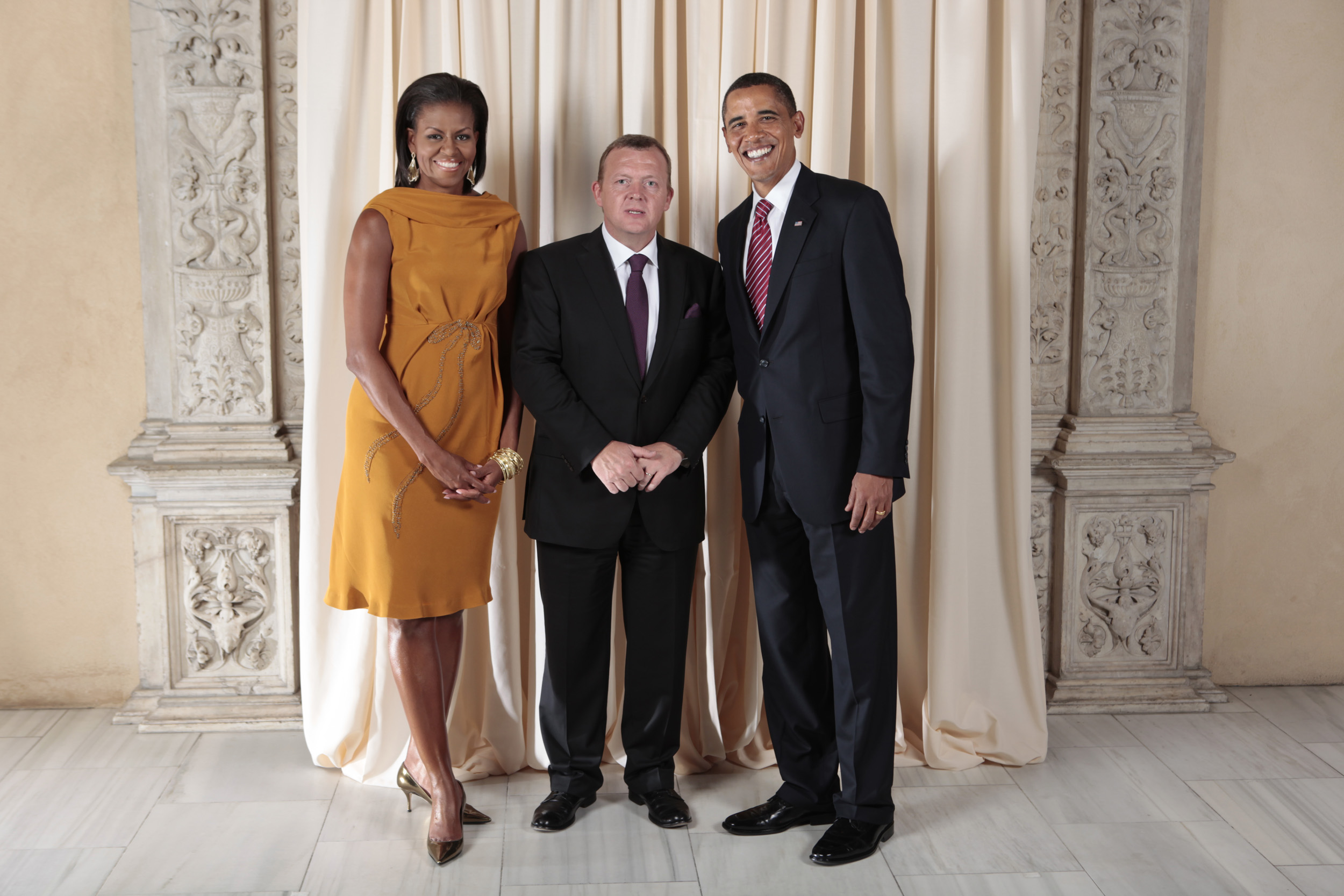

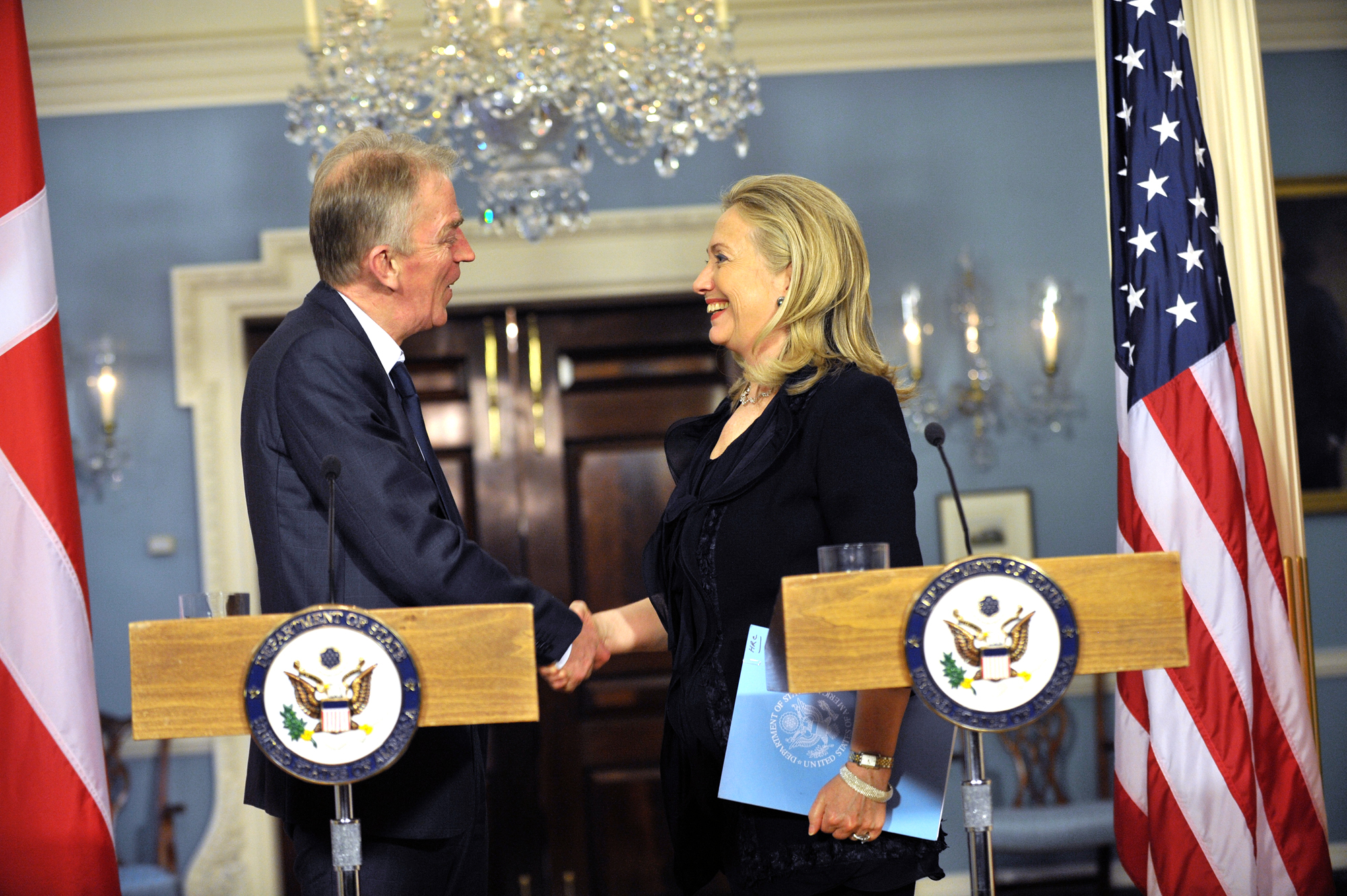

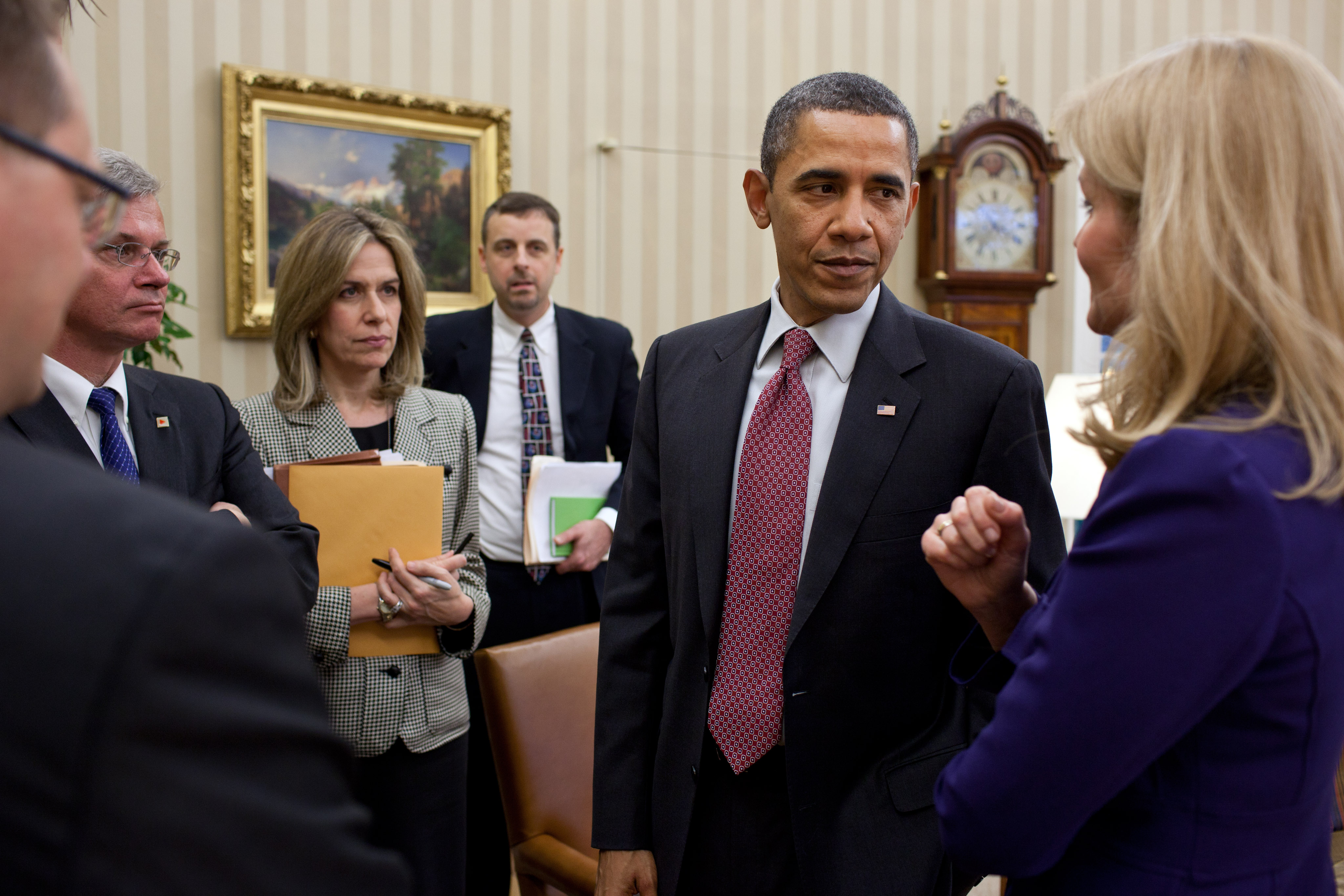

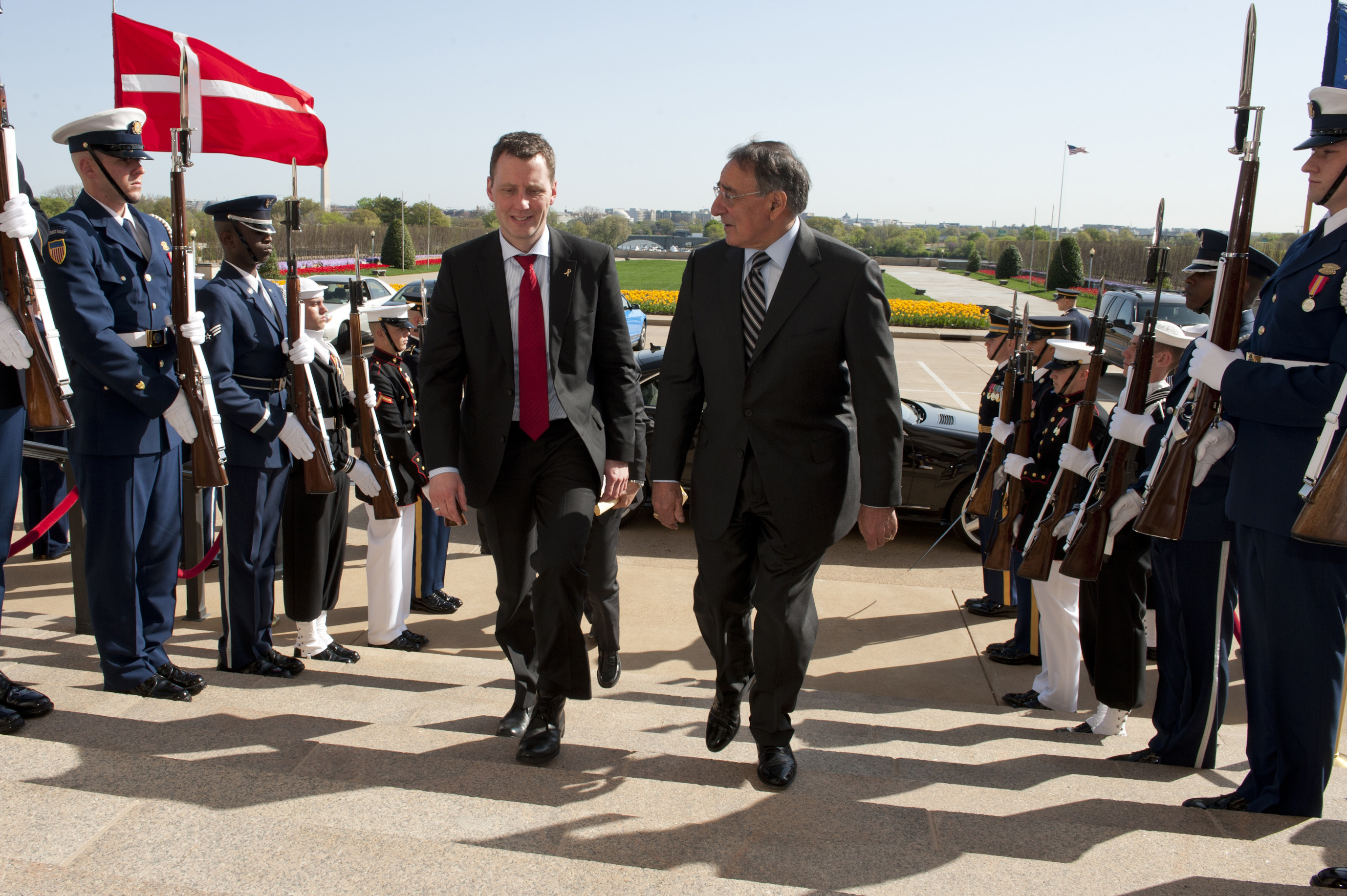

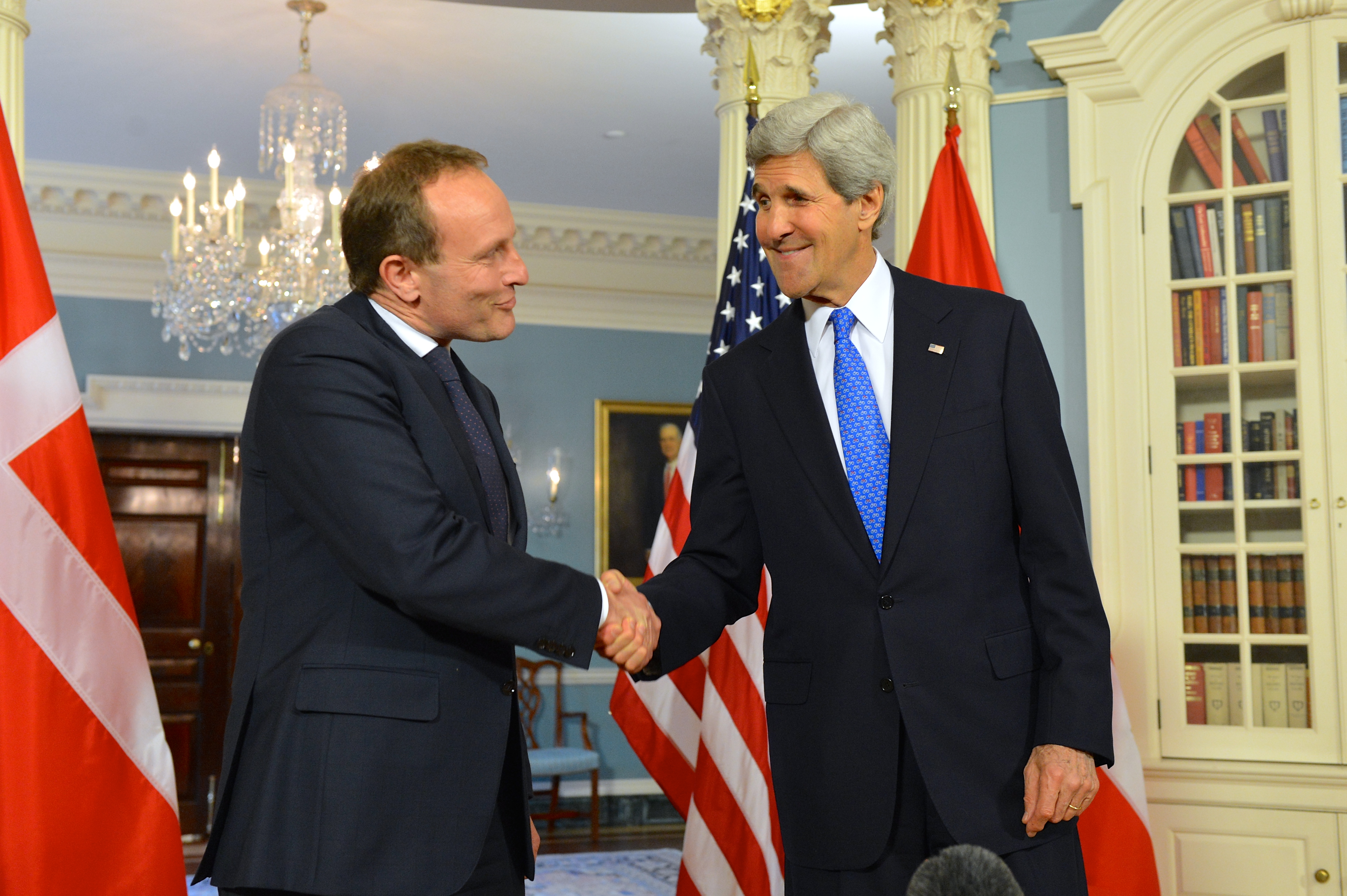

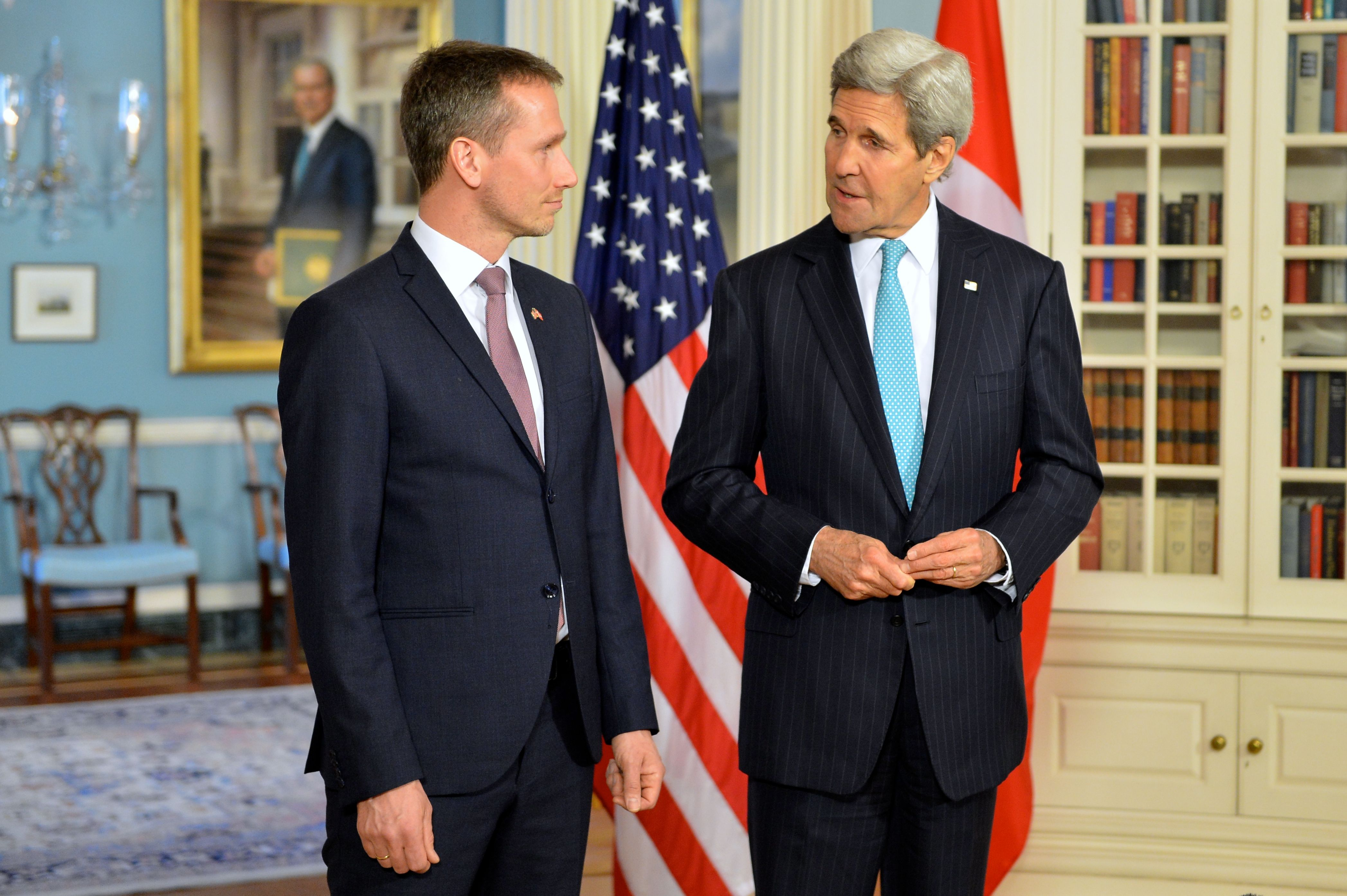

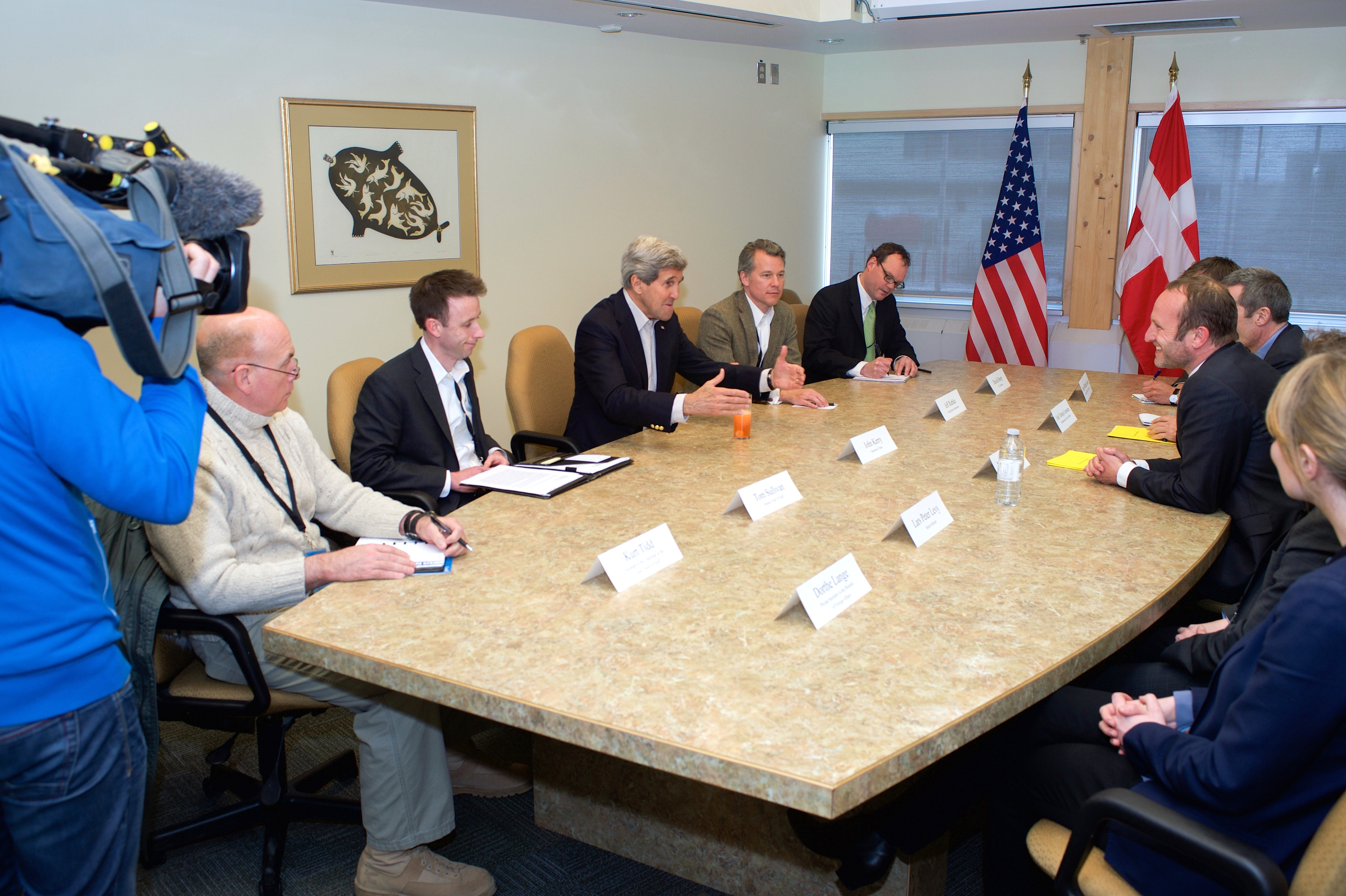

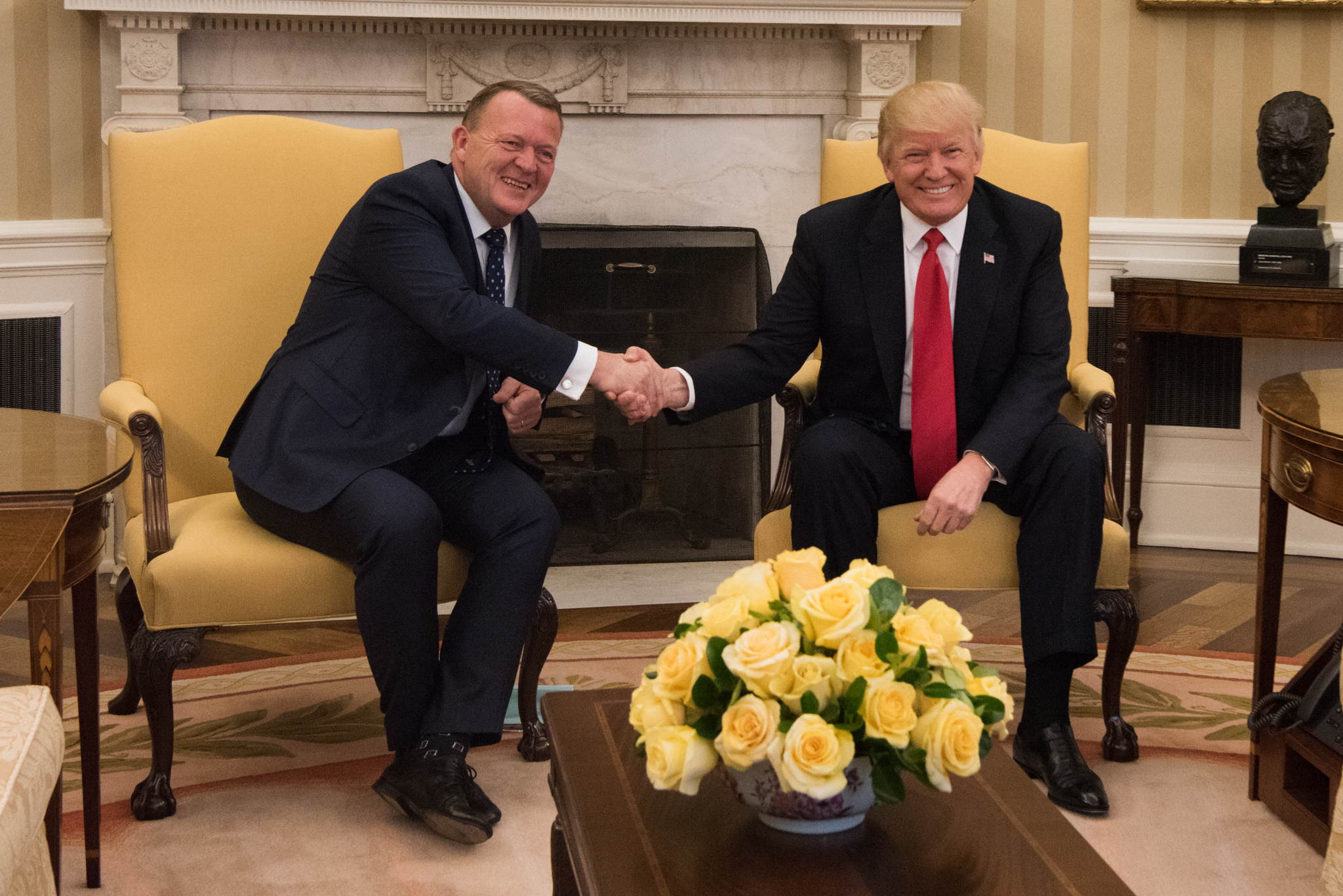

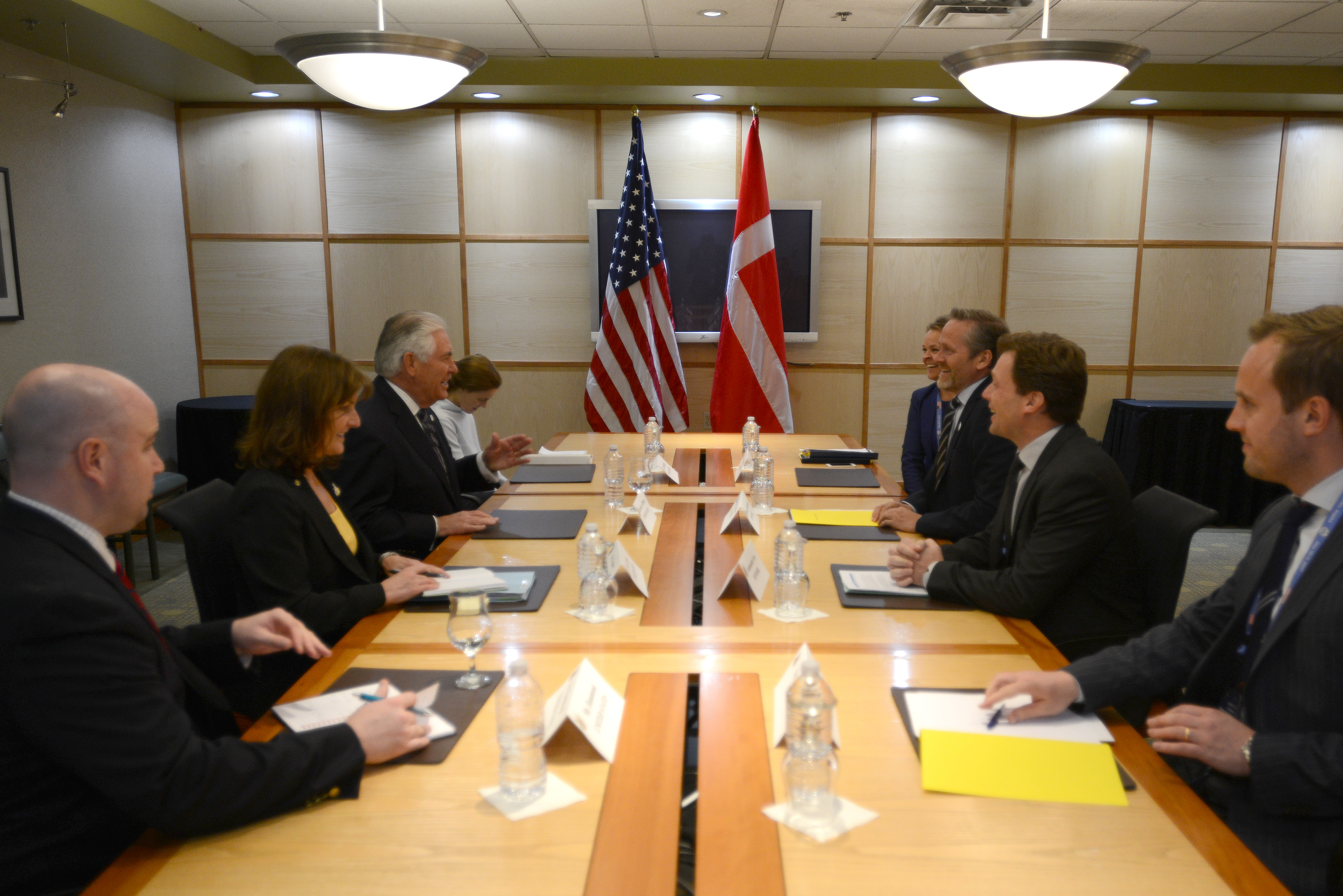

== Estonia ==
Table of Trips
| Start | End | Guest | Title | Reason |
|---|---|---|---|---|
| September 27, 1993 | September 27, 1993 | Lennart Meri | President | Met with President Clinton at the U.N. General Assembly in New York City. |
| June 25, 1996 | June 27, 1996 | Lennart Meri | President | Working visit. Afterwards visited New York City. |
| January 14, 1998 | January 18, 1998 | Lennart Meri | President | Working visit. Signed U.S.-Baltic Charter of Partnership. |
| April 23, 1999 | April 25, 1999 | Lennart Meri | President | Attended NATO's 50th Anniversary Summit. Arrived April 22. |
| September 4, 2002 | September 4, 2002 | Siim Kallas | Prime Minister | |
| March 28, 2004 | March 30, 2004 | Juhan Parts | Prime Minister | Working visit. Attended NATO Accession ceremony. |
| June 24, 2007 | June 27, 2007 | Toomas Hendrik Ilves | President | Working visit. |
| May 20, 2012 | May 21, 2012 | Andrus Ansip | Prime Minister | Attended the NATO Summit meeting in Chicago |
| August 30, 2013 | August 30, 2013 | Toomas Hendrik Ilves | President | Working visit. |
| April 3, 2018 | April 3, 2018 | Kersti Kaljulaid | President | U.S.-Baltic Leaders Summit. |
| July 10, 2024 | July 11, 2024 | Kaja Kallas | Prime Minister | Attended NATO 75th Anniversary Summit in Washington, D.C. |

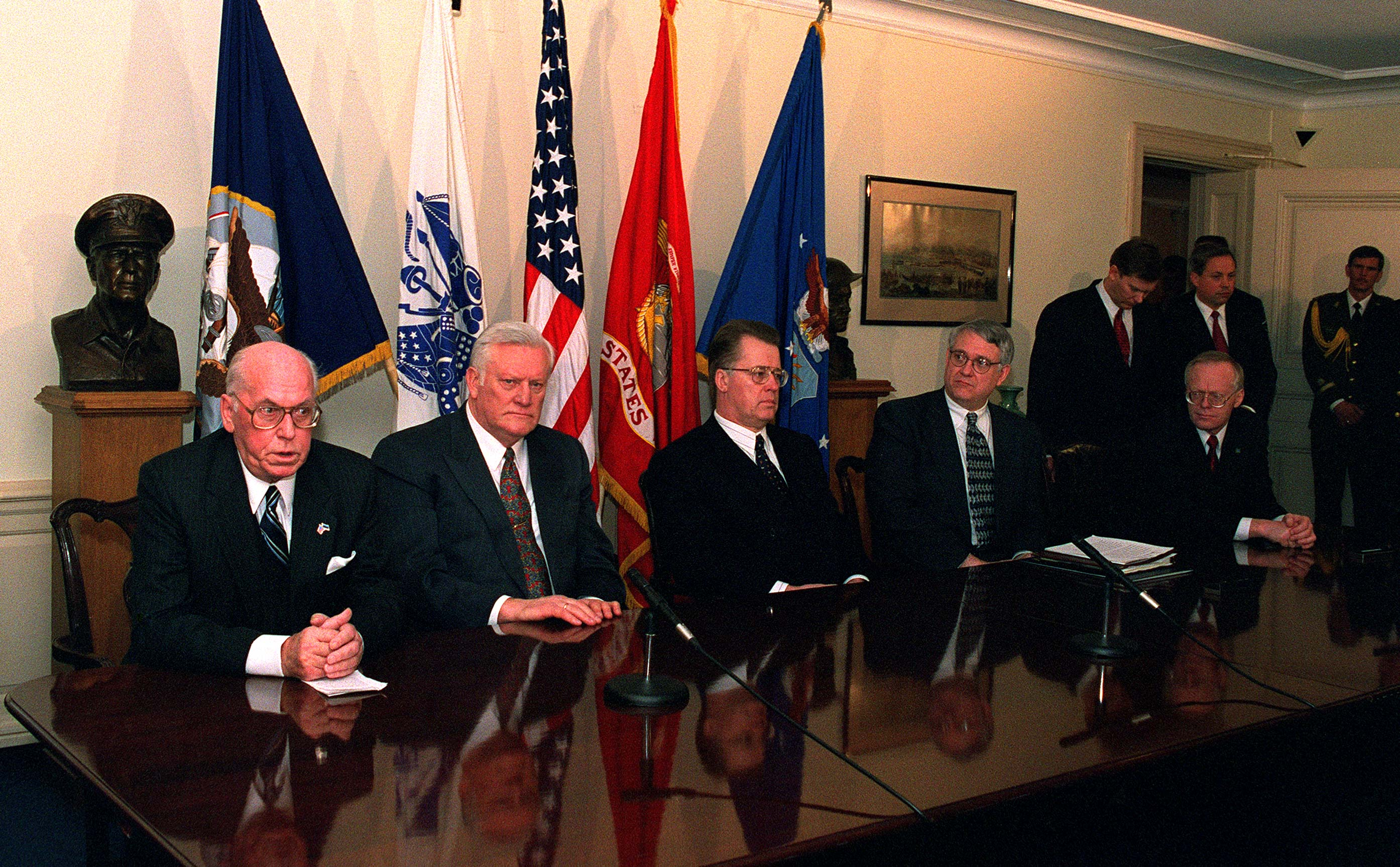

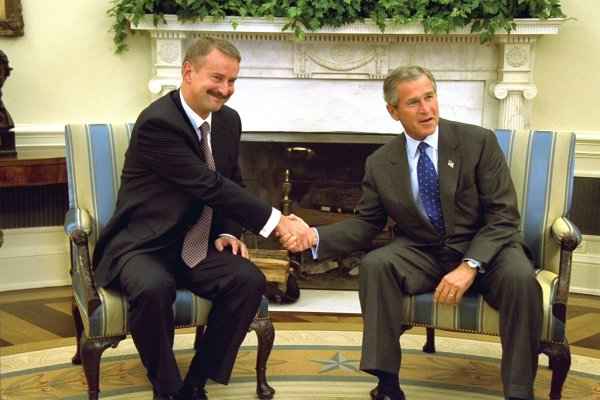

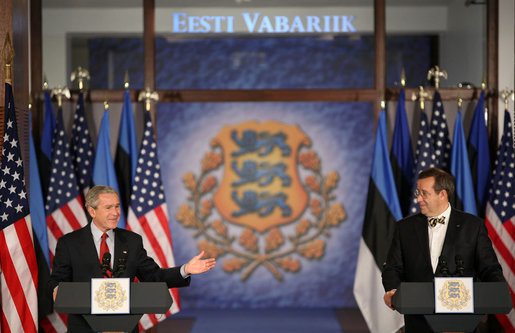

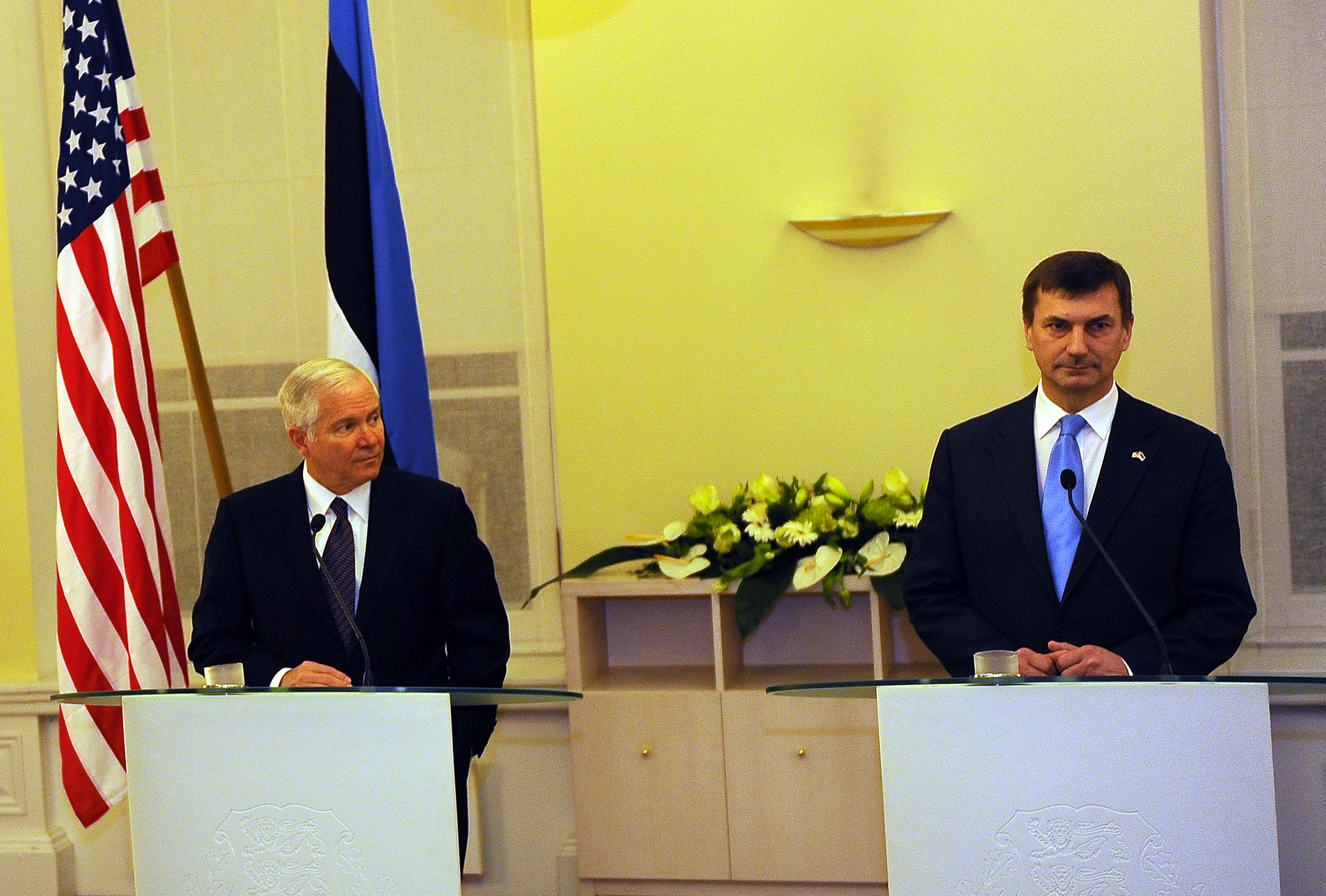

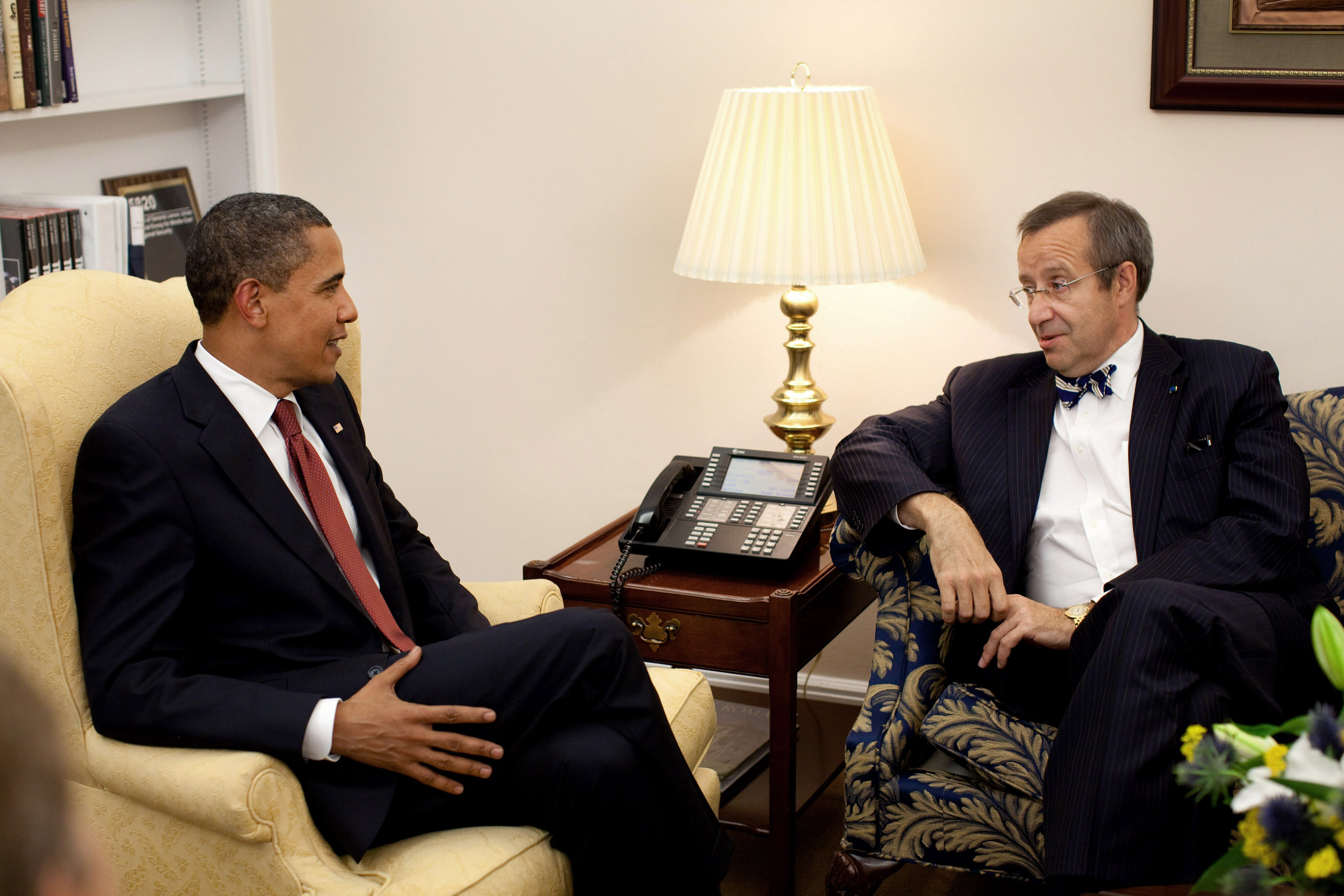

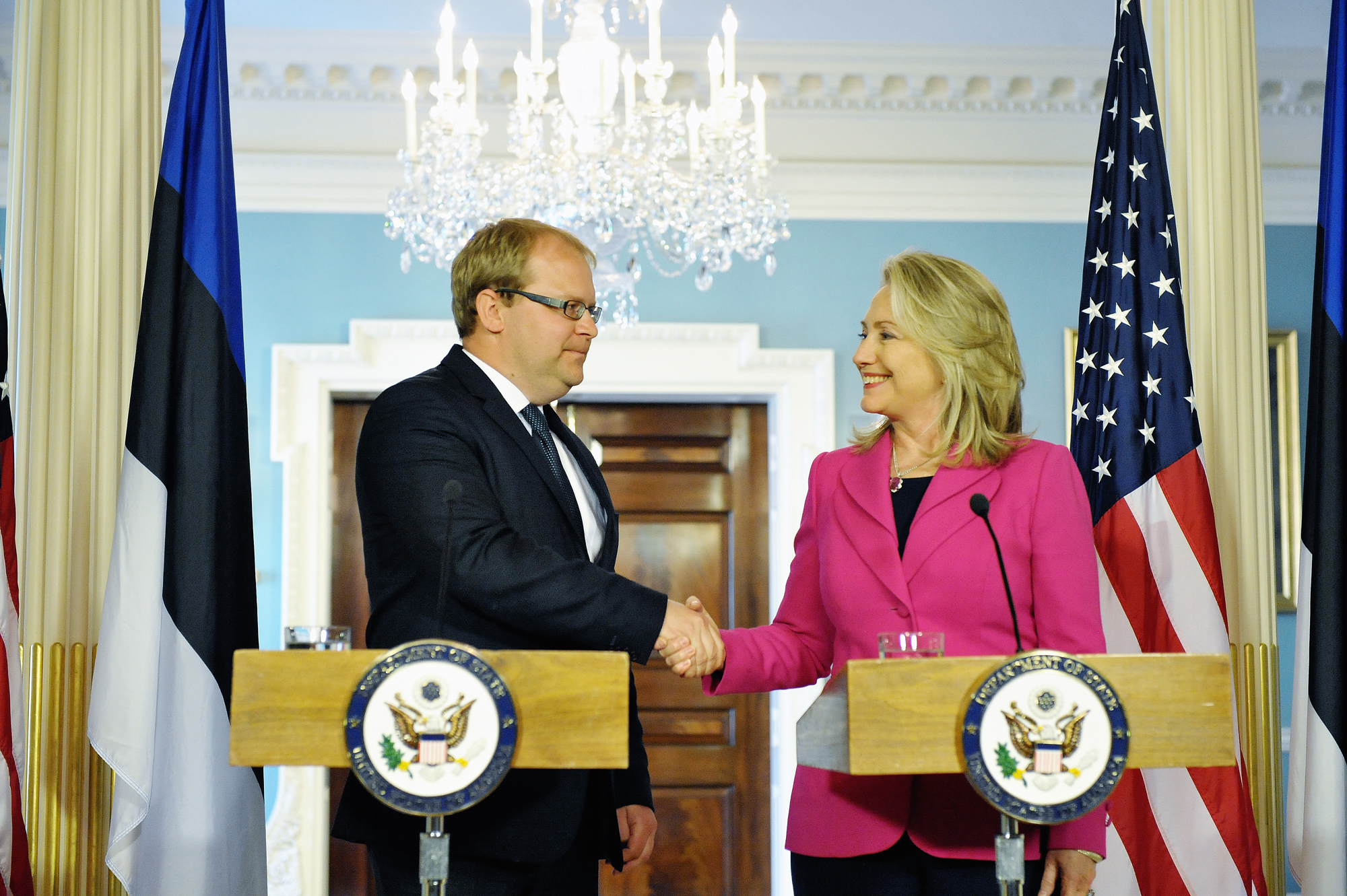

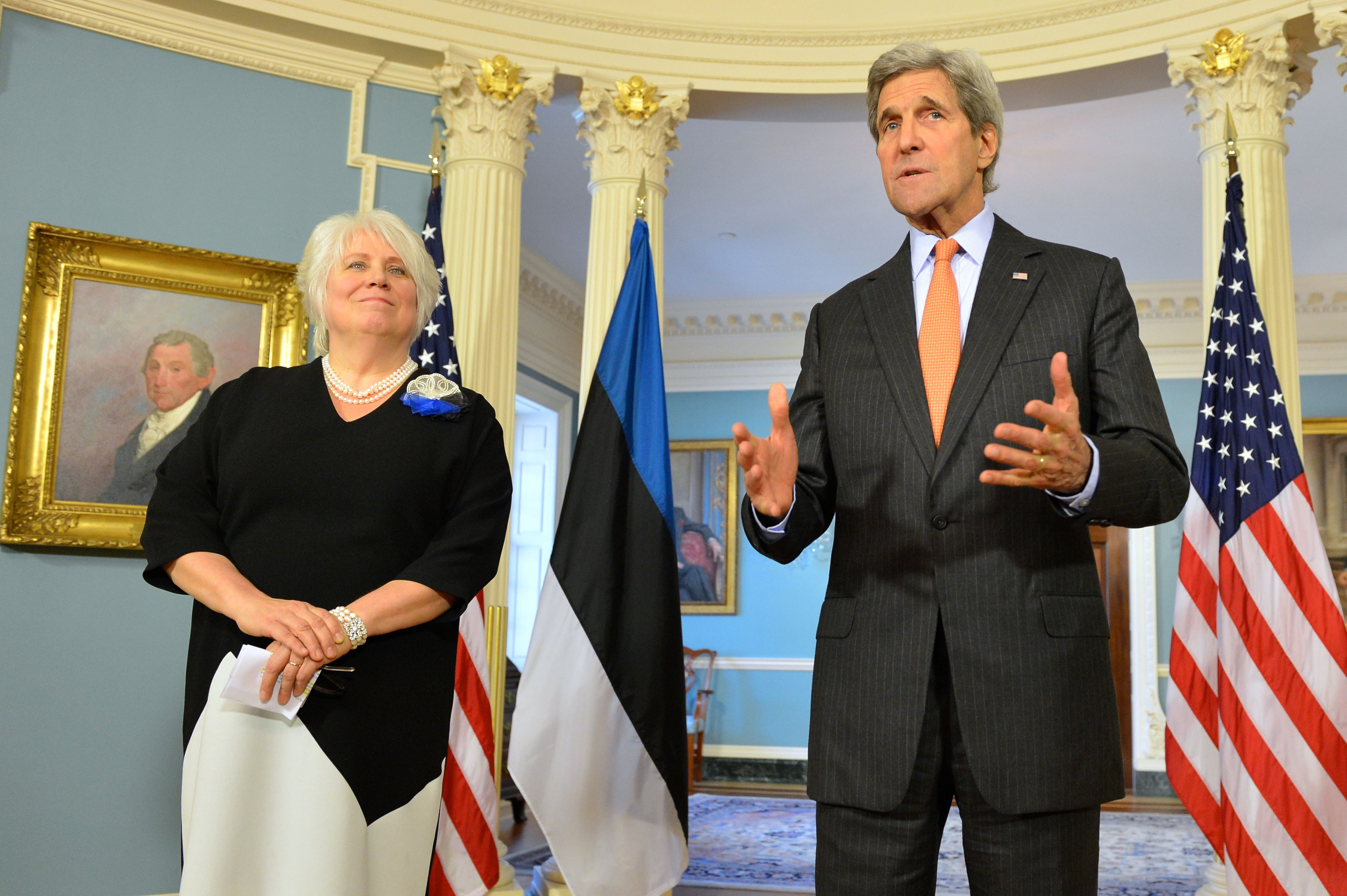

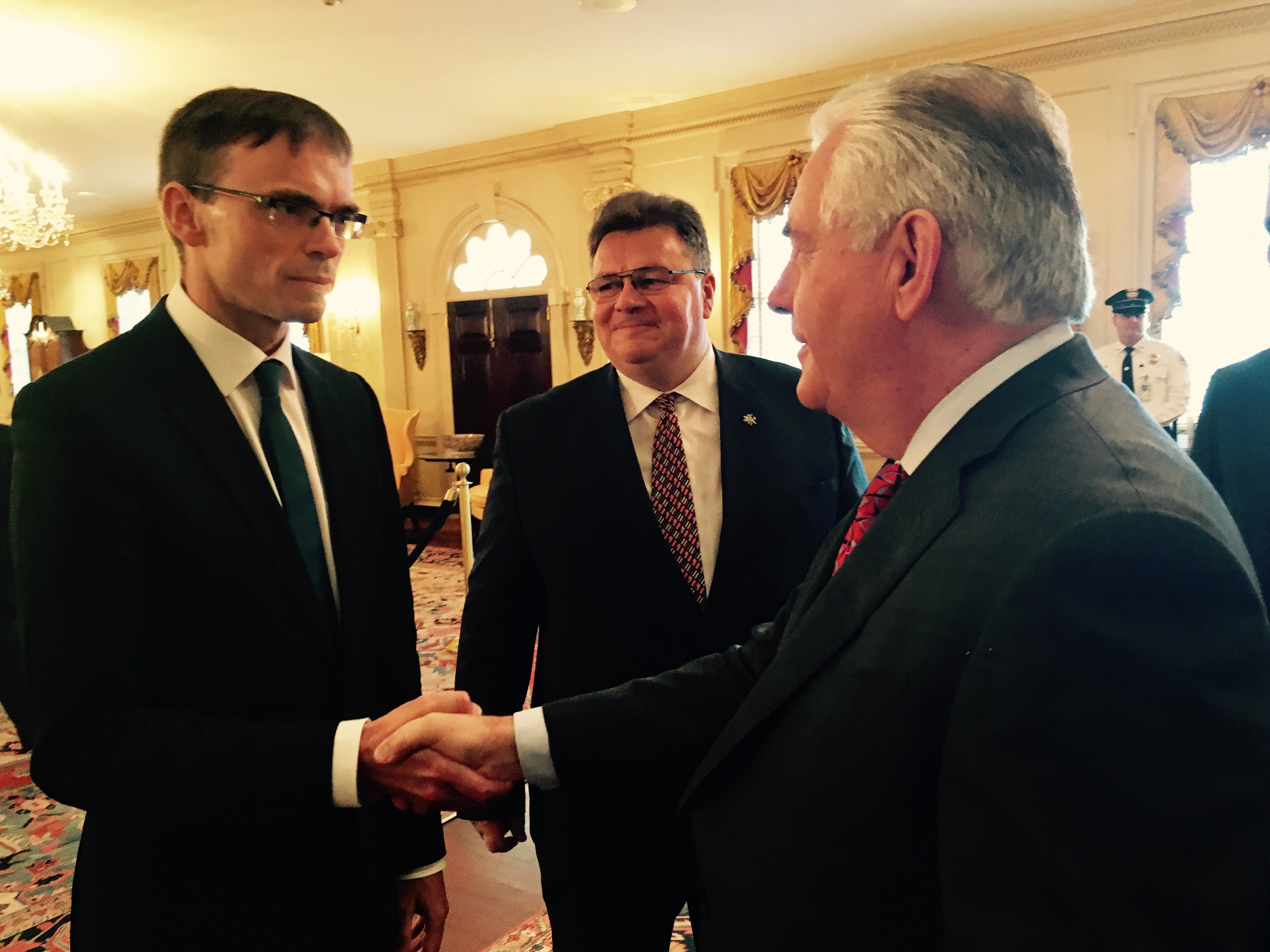

== Finland ==
Table of Trips
| Start | End | Guest | Title | Reason |
|---|---|---|---|---|
| May 8, 1958 | May 14, 1958 | Reino Kuuskoski | Prime Minister | Unofficial visit; attended Minnesota Statehood Centennial in Minneapolis and St. Paul. |
| October 16, 1961 | October 18, 1961 | Urho Kekkonen | President | Official visit. Afterwards visited New York City, Detroit, Duluth, San Francisco, Los Angeles, and Honolulu, Hawaii. Departed U.S. November 2. |
| July 23, 1970 | July 25, 1970 | Urho Kekkonen | President | Official visit. In U.S. July 22–27; visited Williamsburg, Fitchburg, Wood's Hole, and New York City. |
| October 24, 1970 | October 24, 1970 | Urho Kekkonen | President | Attended White House dinner on 25th Anniversary of the U.N |
| August 3, 1976 | August 5, 1976 | Urho Kekkonen | President | State visit. Private visit to New York City, Hancock, and Williamsburg July 30 – August 3. Private visit afterwards to Minneapolis and New York City. |
| May 17, 1979 | May 17, 1979 | Kalevi Sorsa | Prime Minister | Informal visit while serving as Chairman of the Socialist International Study Group on Disarmament. |
| September 24, 1983 | September 27, 1983 | Mauno Koivisto | President | Official working visit. |
| May 2, 1988 | May 2, 1988 | Harri Holkeri | Prime Minister | Met with President Reagan during a private visit. |
| May 6, 1991 | May 8, 1991 | Mauno Koivisto | President | Official working visit. |
| May 12, 1992 | May 17, 1992 | Esko Aho | Prime Minister | Met with President Bush during a private visit. |
| November 8, 1994 | November 10, 1994 | Martti Ahtisaari | President | Met with President Clinton during a private visit. |
| April 23, 1999 | April 25, 1999 | Martti Ahtisaari | President | Attended NATO's 50th Anniversary Summit. |
| December 16, 1999 | December 17, 1999 | Martti Ahtisaari | President | Working visit. |
| April 28, 2000 | April 28, 2000 | Tarja Halonen | President | Private visit. |
| April 16, 2002 | April 16, 2002 | Tarja Halonen | President | Met with President Bush during a private visit. |
| December 7, 2002 | December 9, 2002 | Paavo Lipponen | Prime Minister | Working visit. |
| April 12, 2010 | April 13, 2010 | Tarja Halonen | President | Attended the Nuclear Security Summit. |
| May 20, 2012 | May 21, 2012 | Sauli Niinistö | President | Attended the NATO Summit Meeting in Chicago. |
| March 31, 2016 | April 1, 2016 | Sauli Niinistö | President | Attended the Nuclear Security Summit. |
| May 13, 2016 | May 13, 2016 | Sauli Niinistö | President | Attended the U.S.-Nordic Leaders Summit. |
| August 28, 2017 | August 28, 2017 | Sauli Niinistö | President | Official Working visit. |
| October 1, 2019 | October 3, 2019 | Sauli Niinistö | President | Official Working visit. |
| March 4, 2022 | March 4, 2022 | Sauli Niinistö | President | Working visit. |
| March 9, 2023 | March 9, 2023 | Sauli Niinistö | President | Working visit. |
| July 9, 2024 | July 11, 2024 | Alexander Stubb | President | Attended NATO 75th Anniversary Summit in Washington, D.C. |

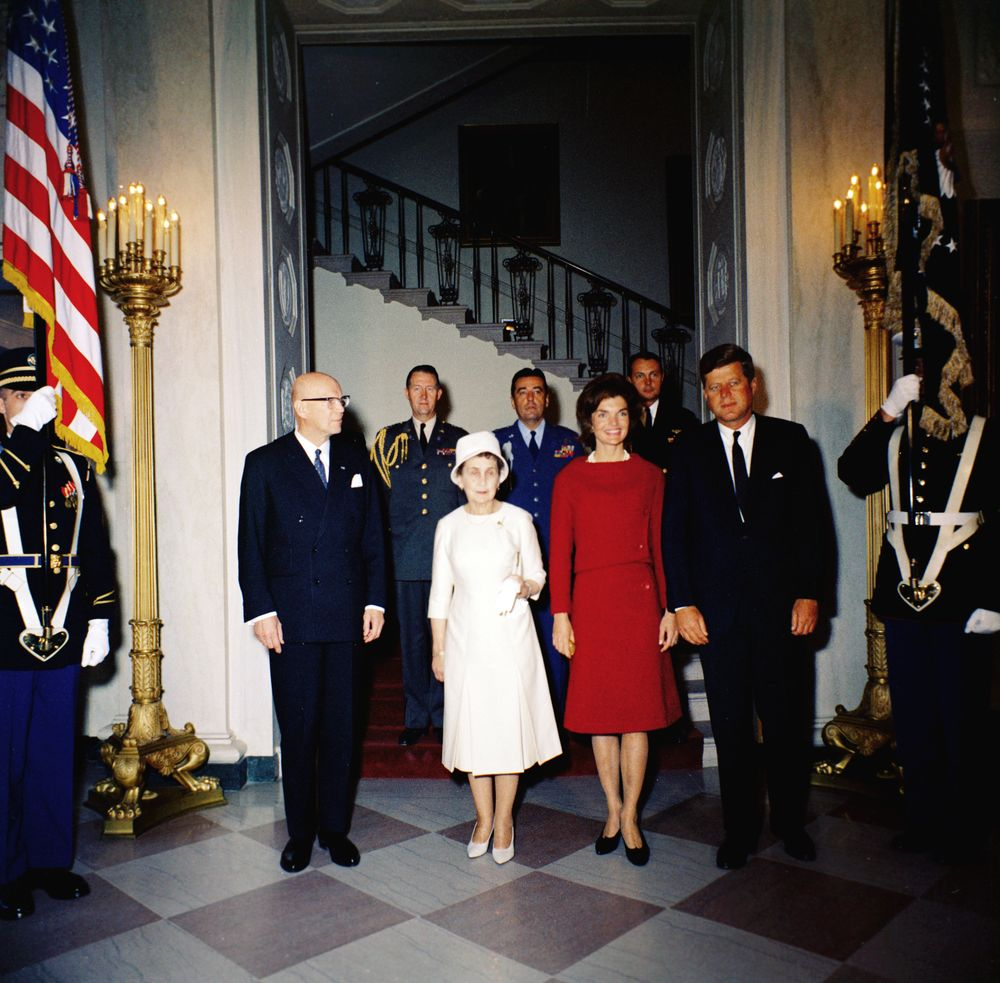

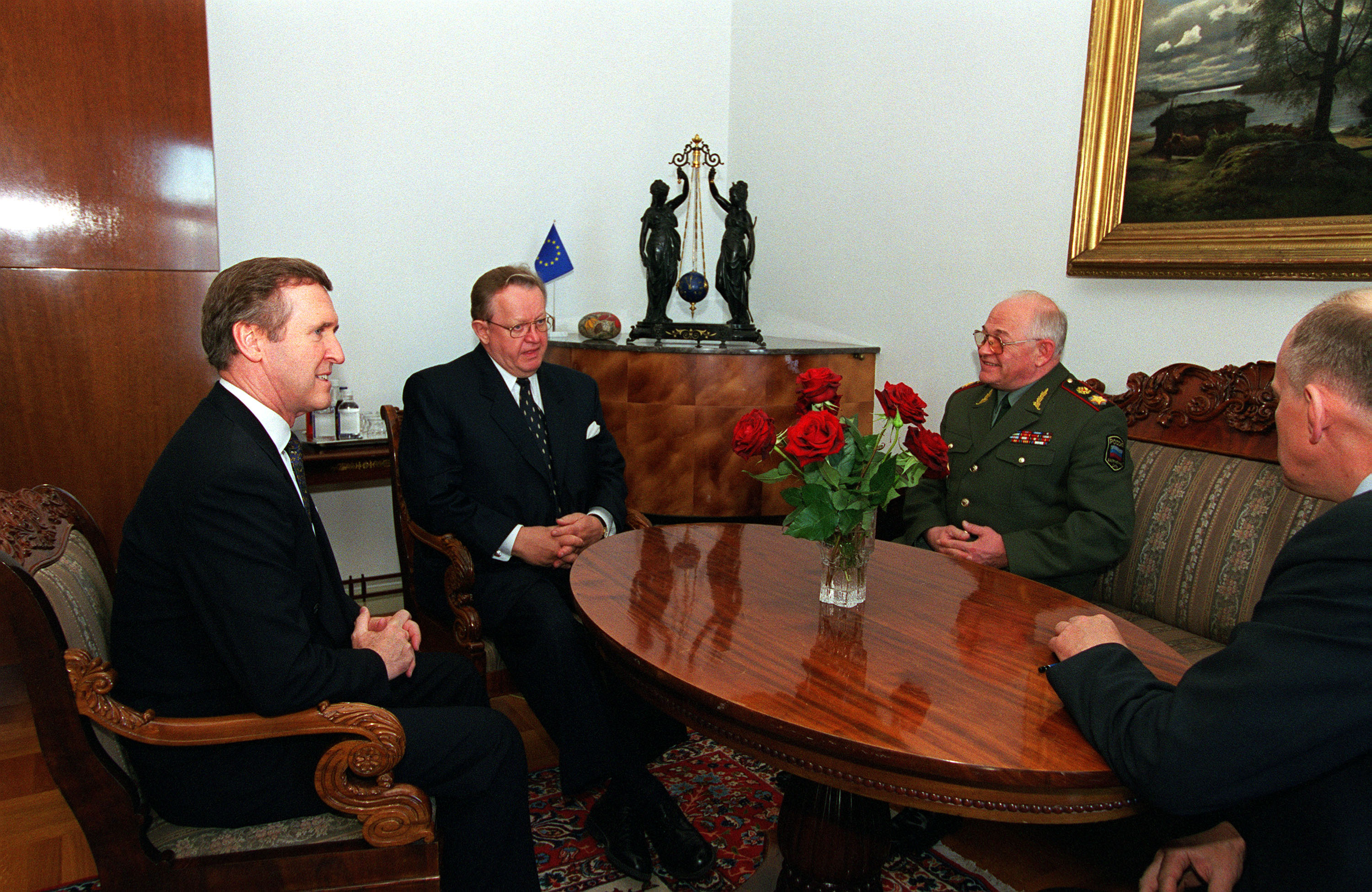

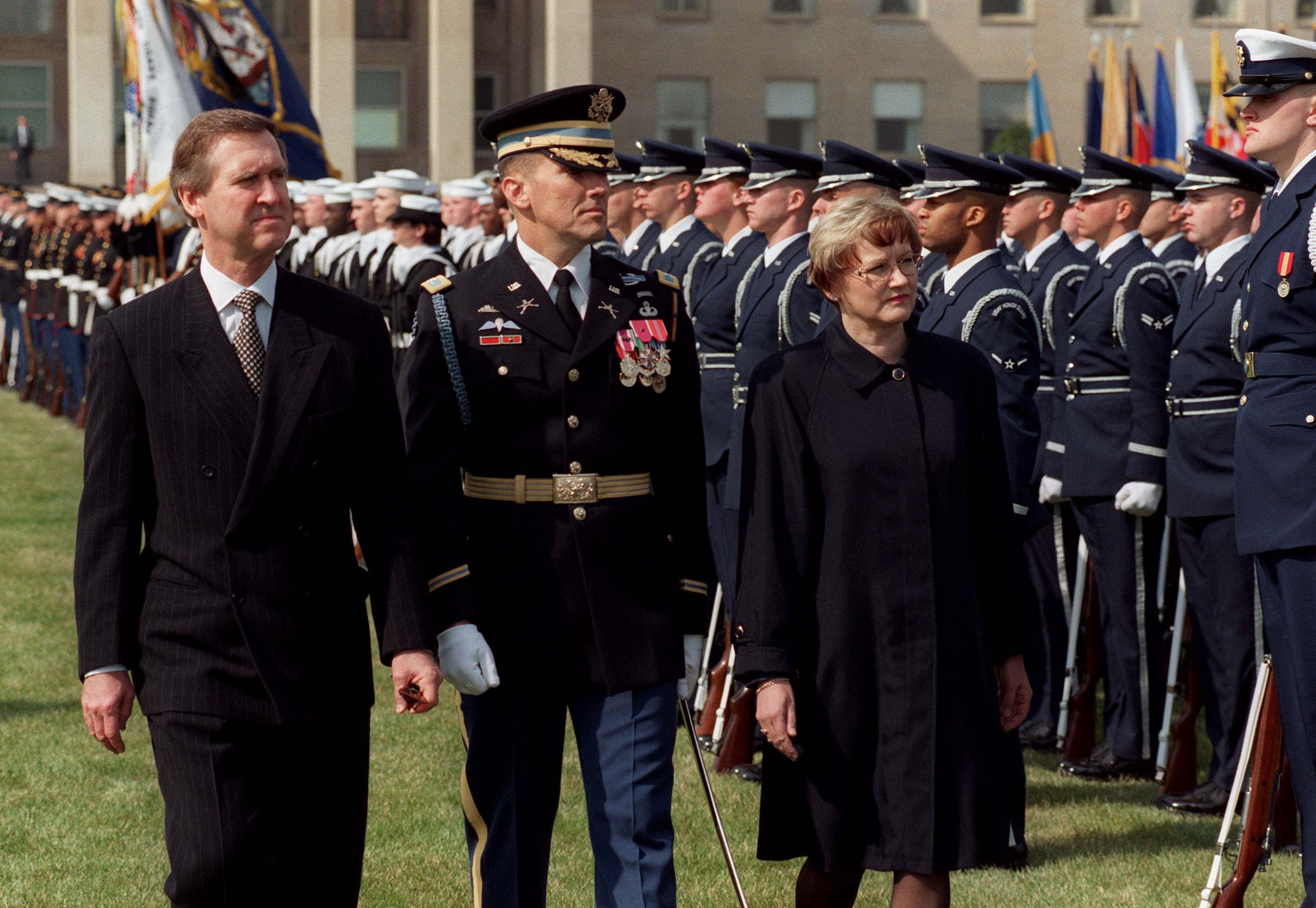

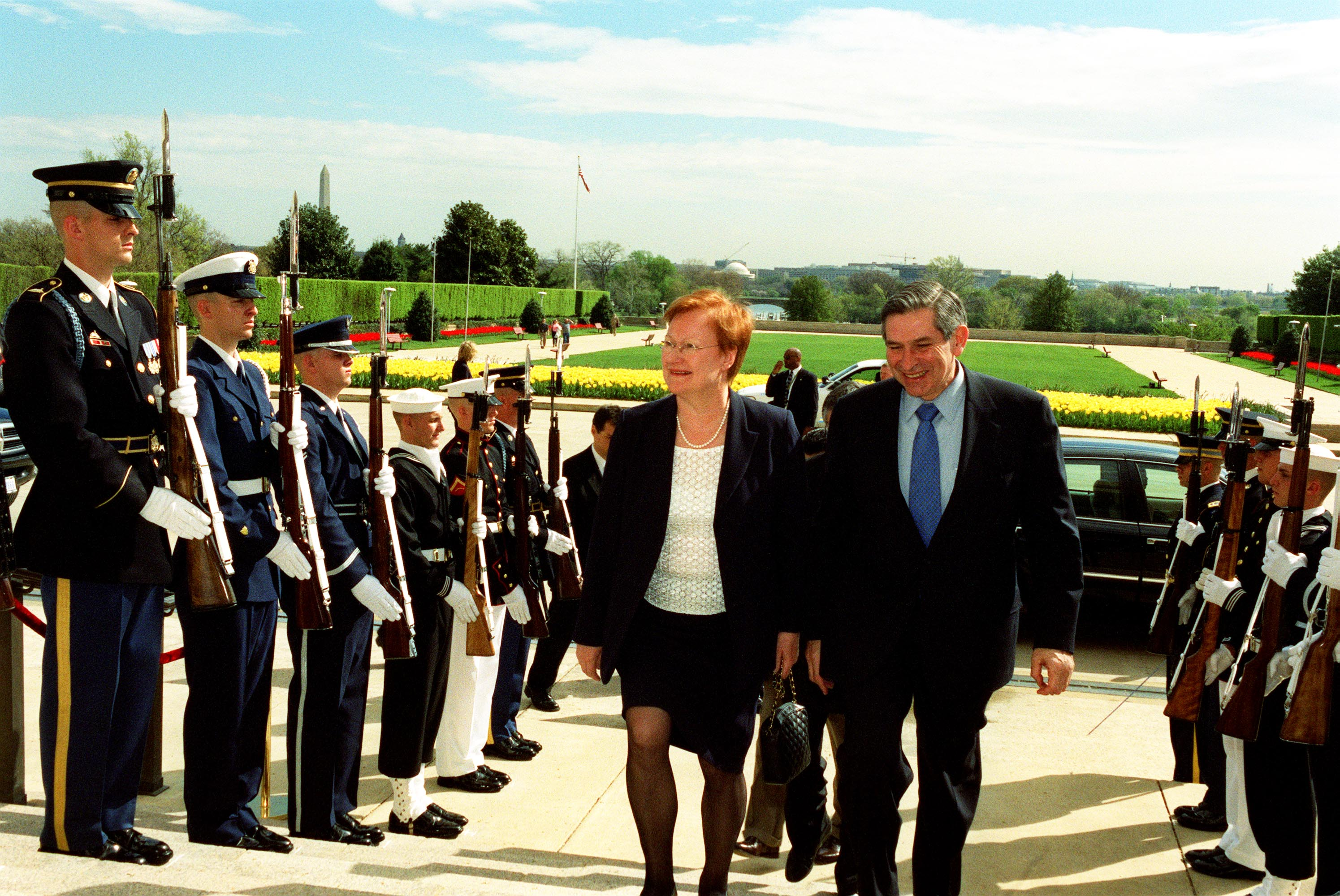

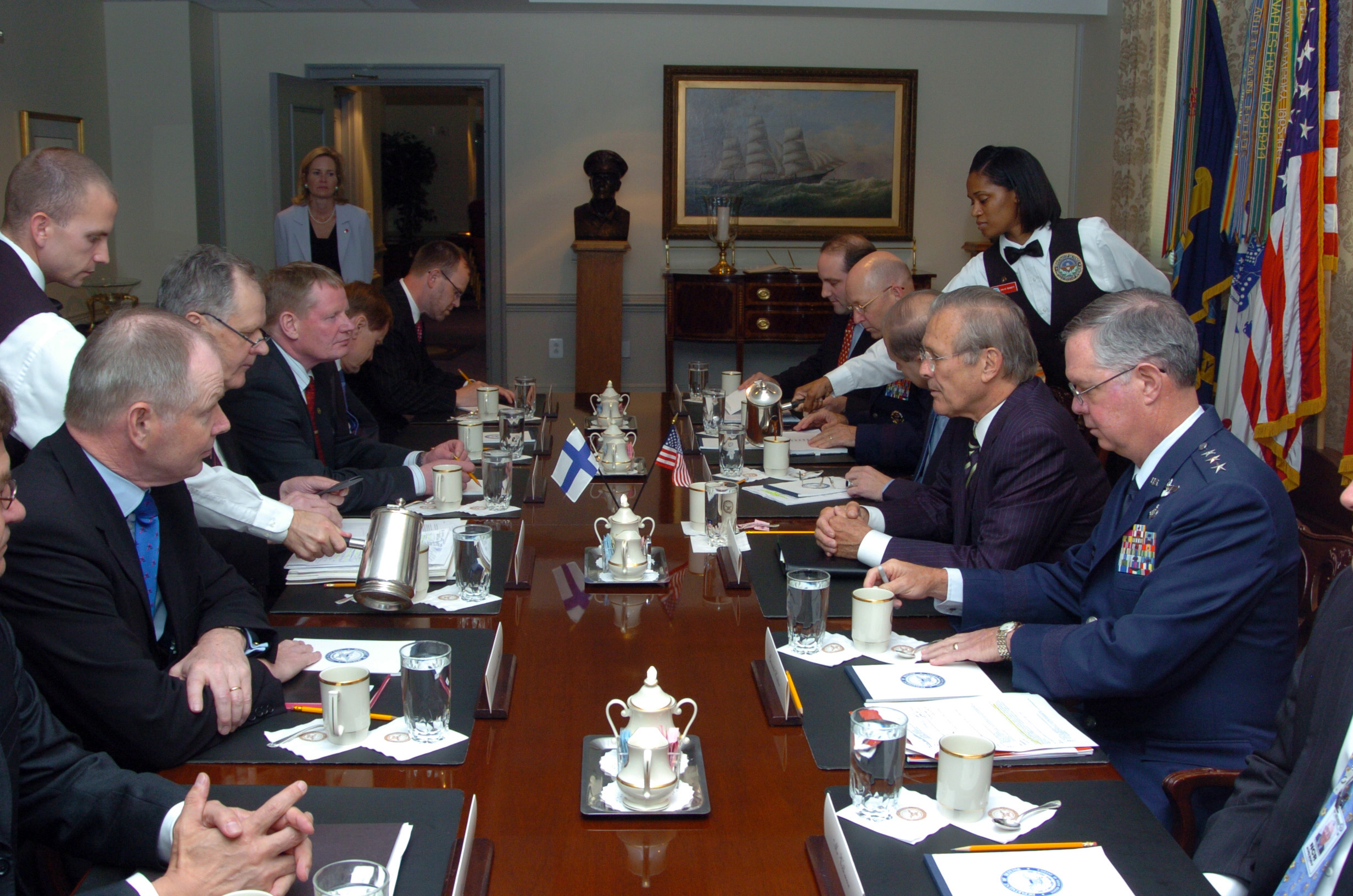

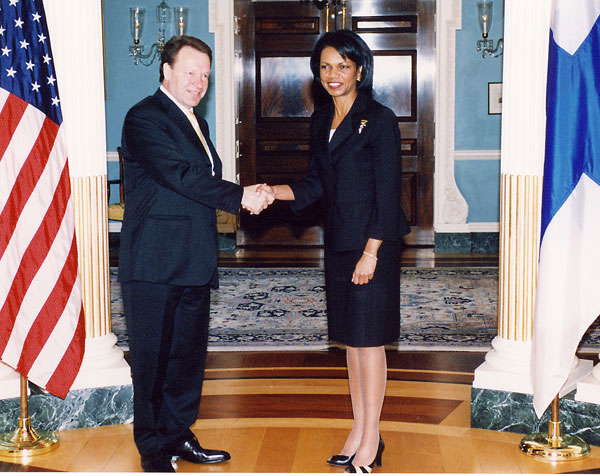

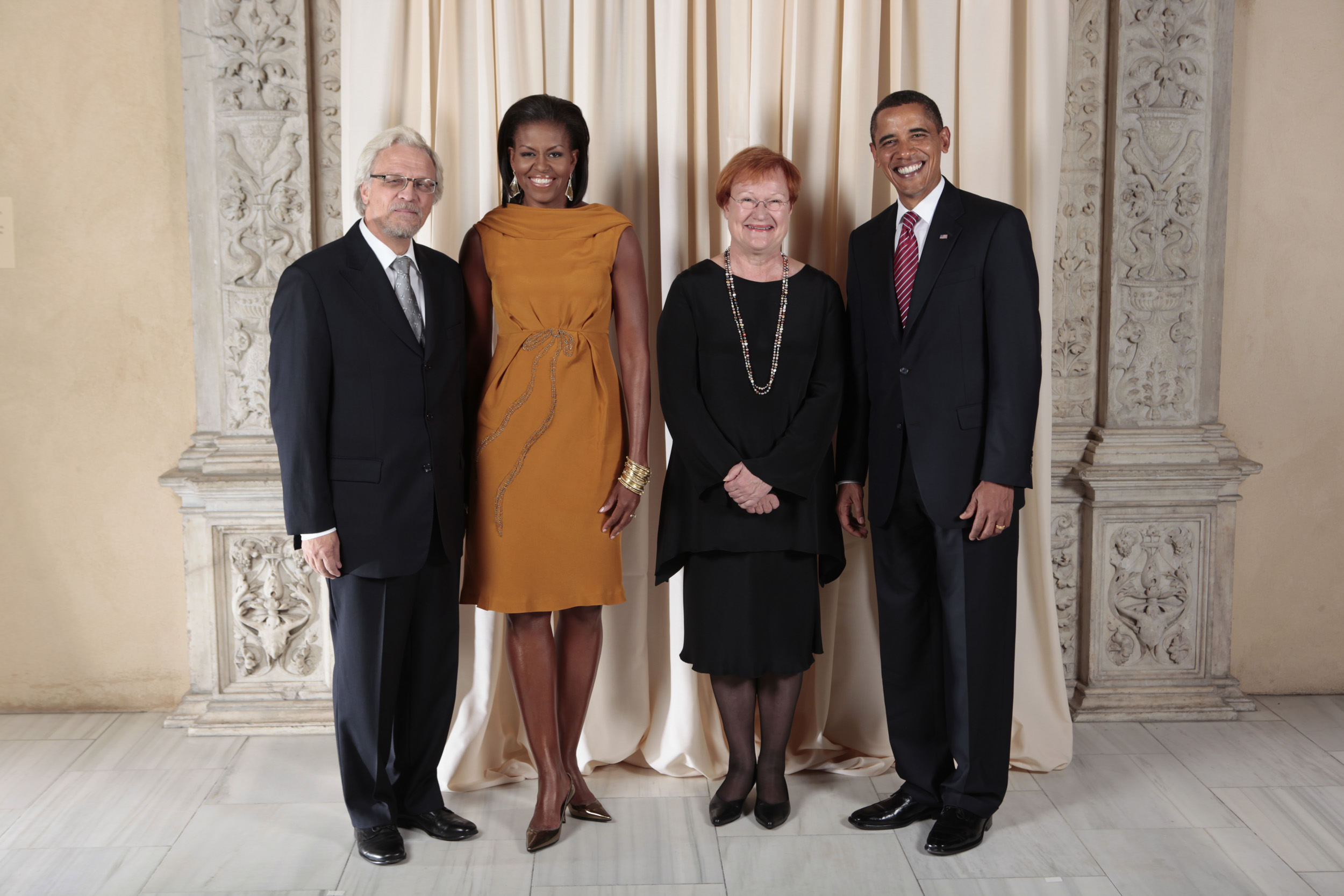

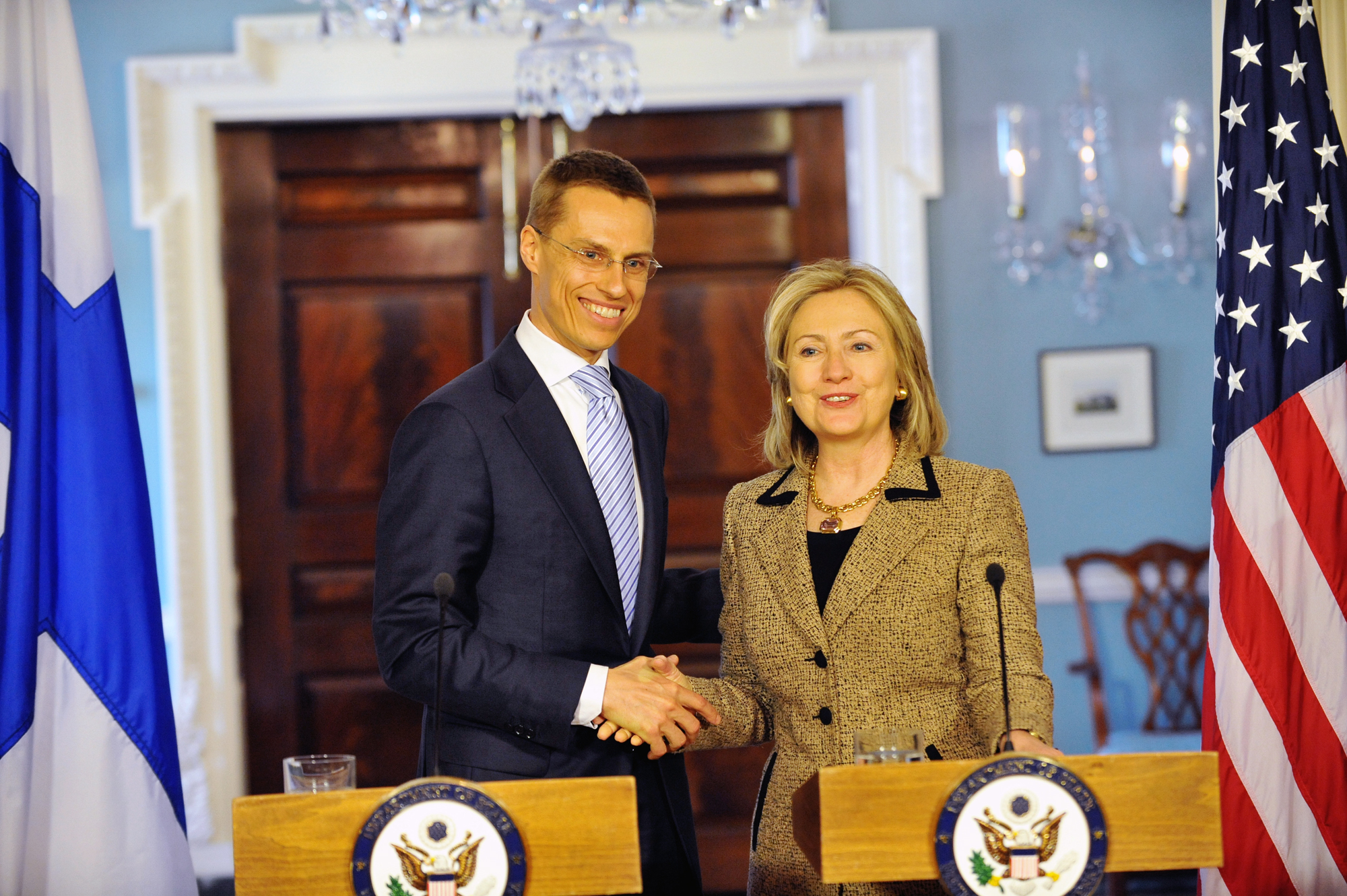

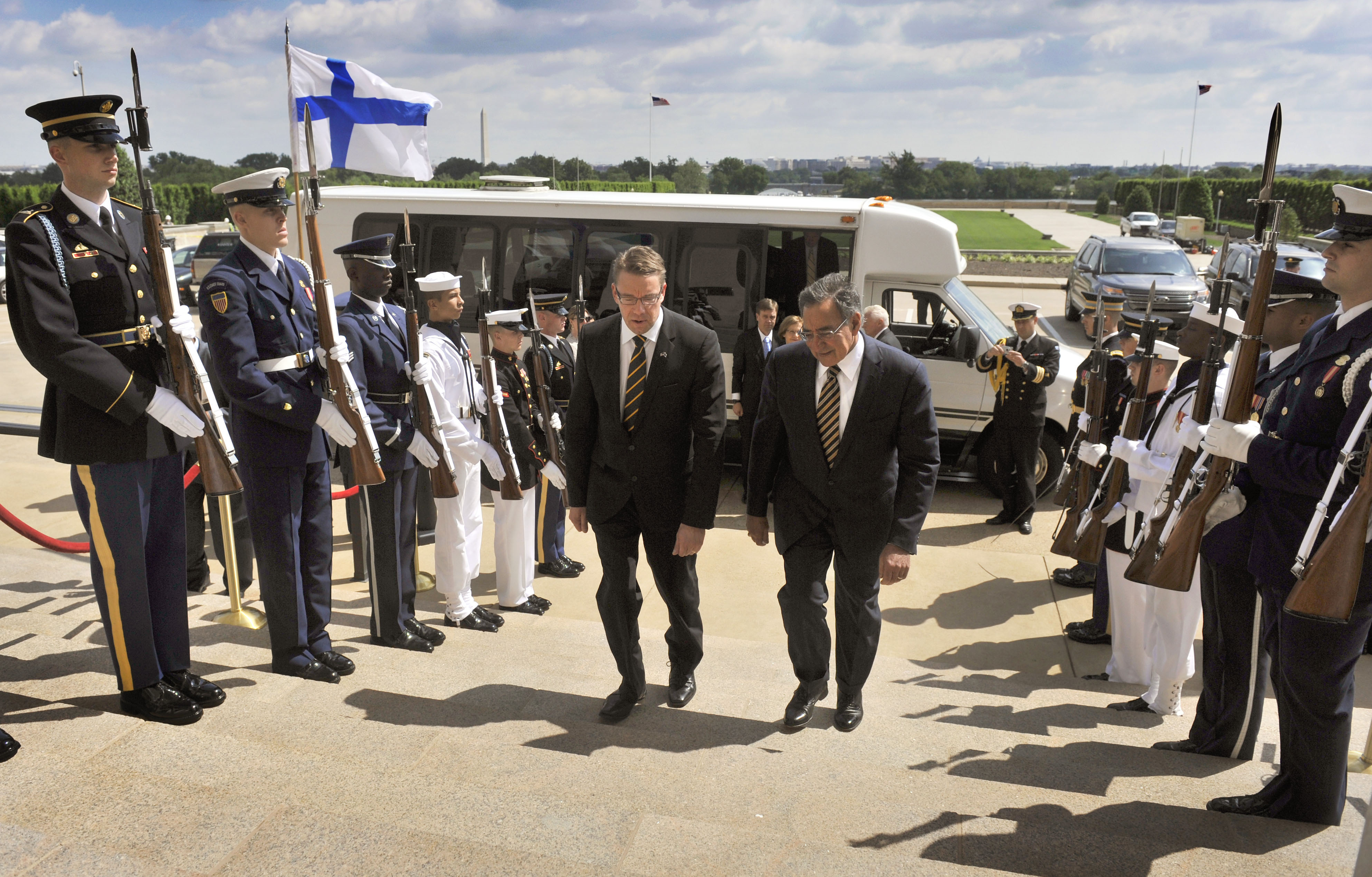

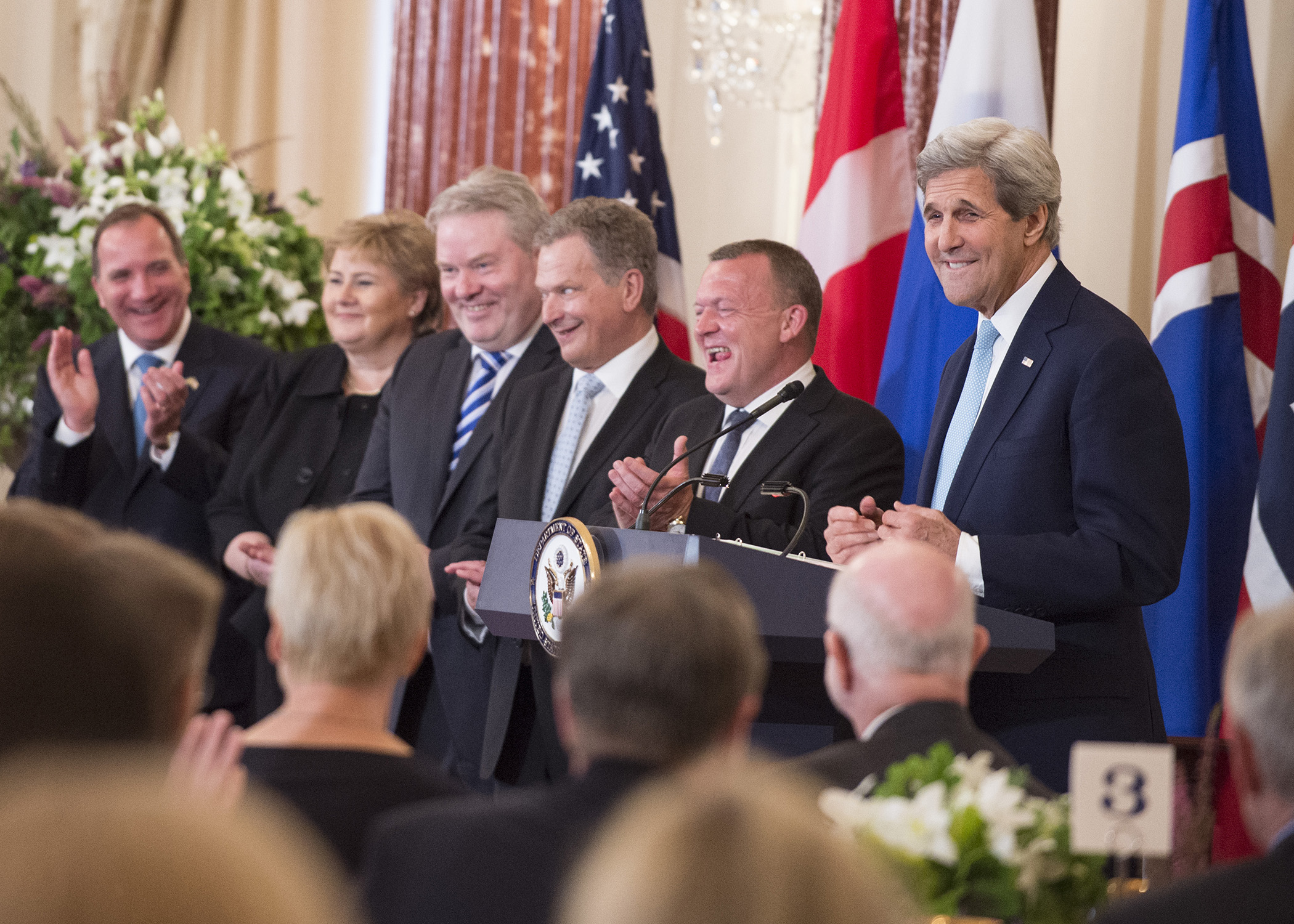

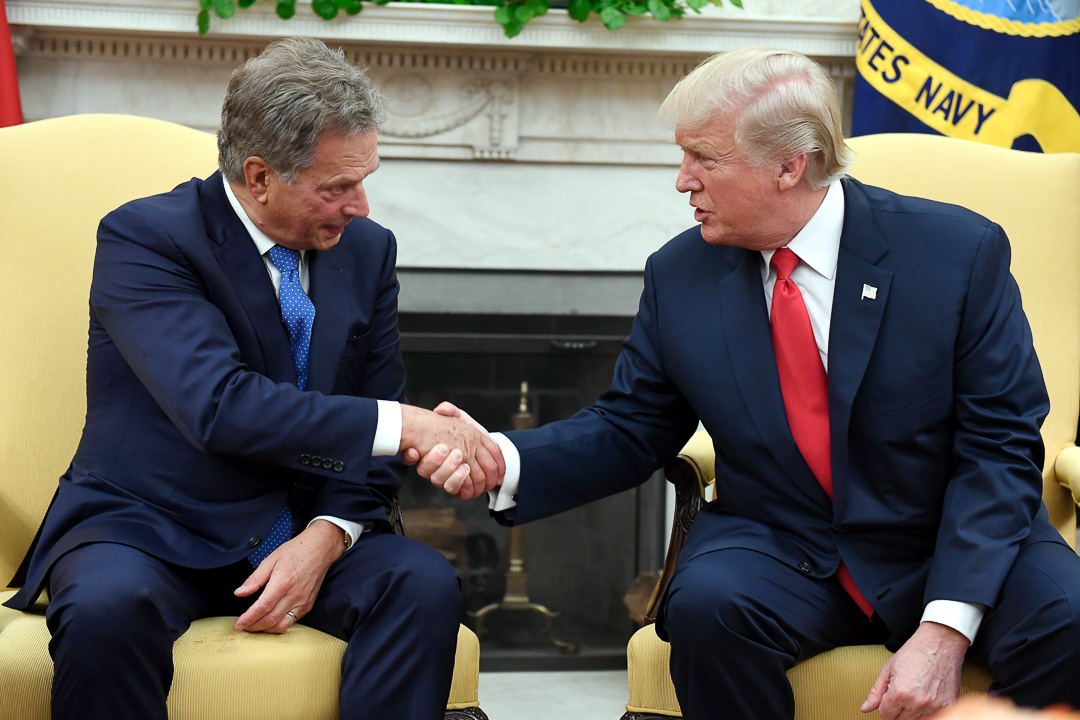

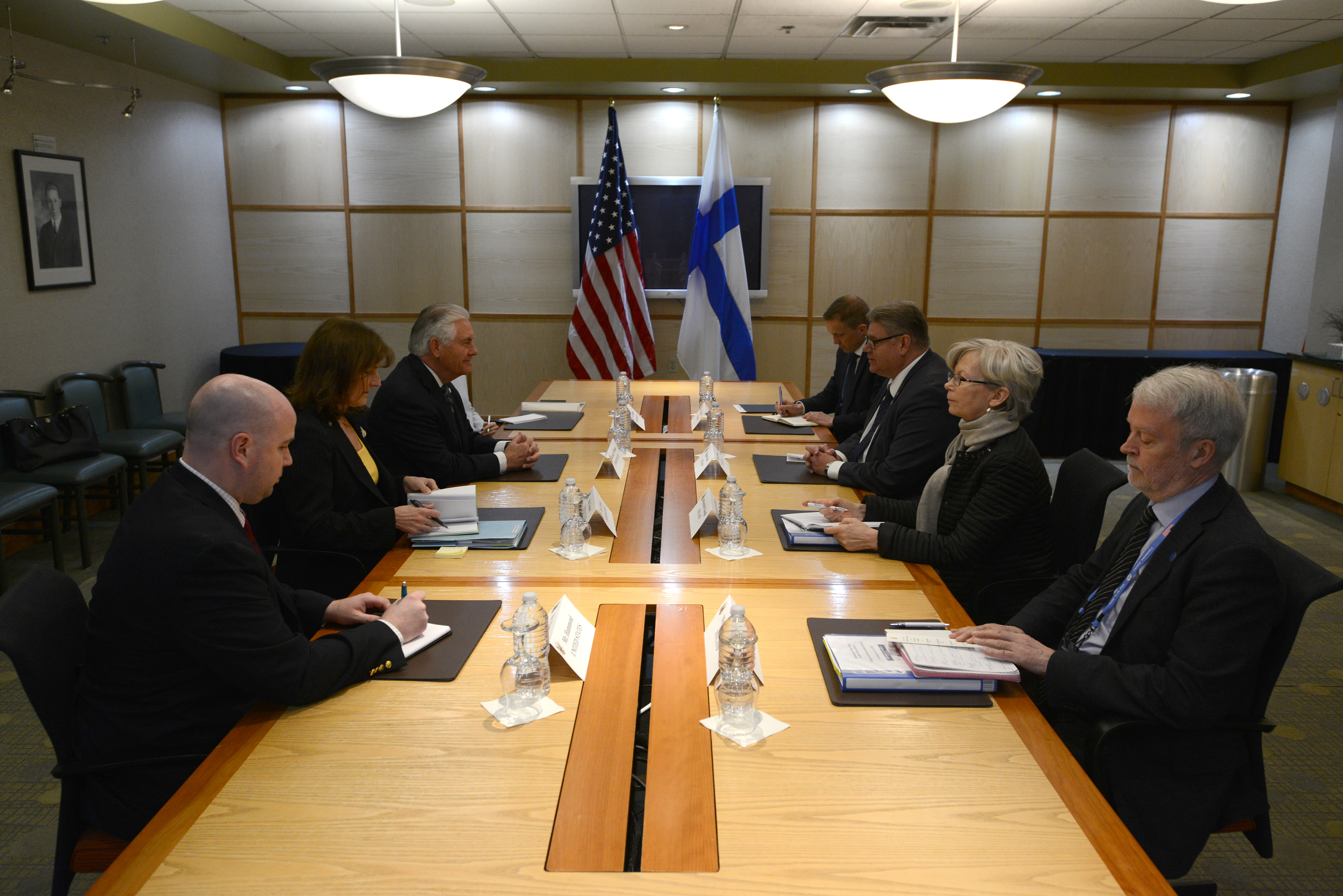

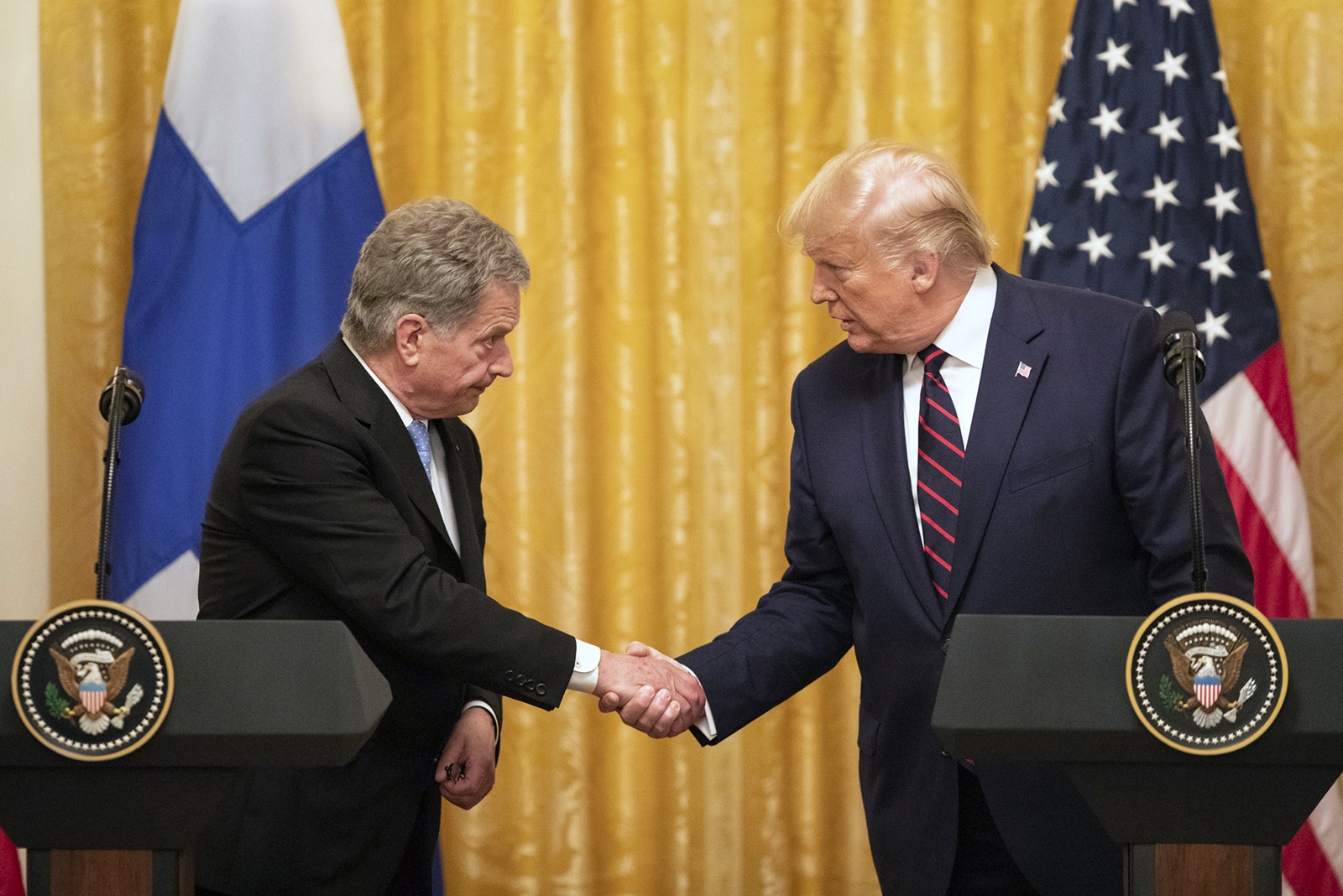

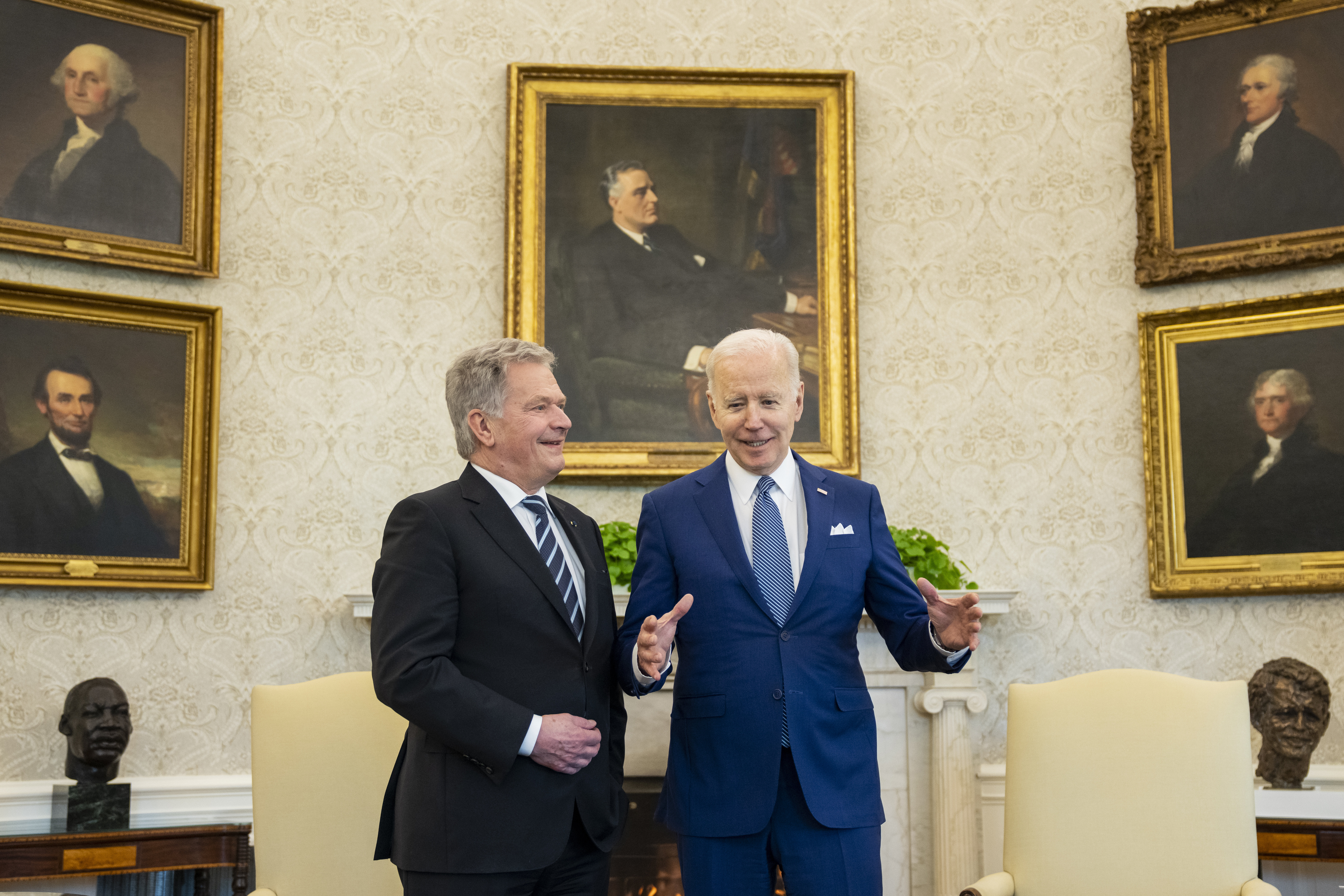

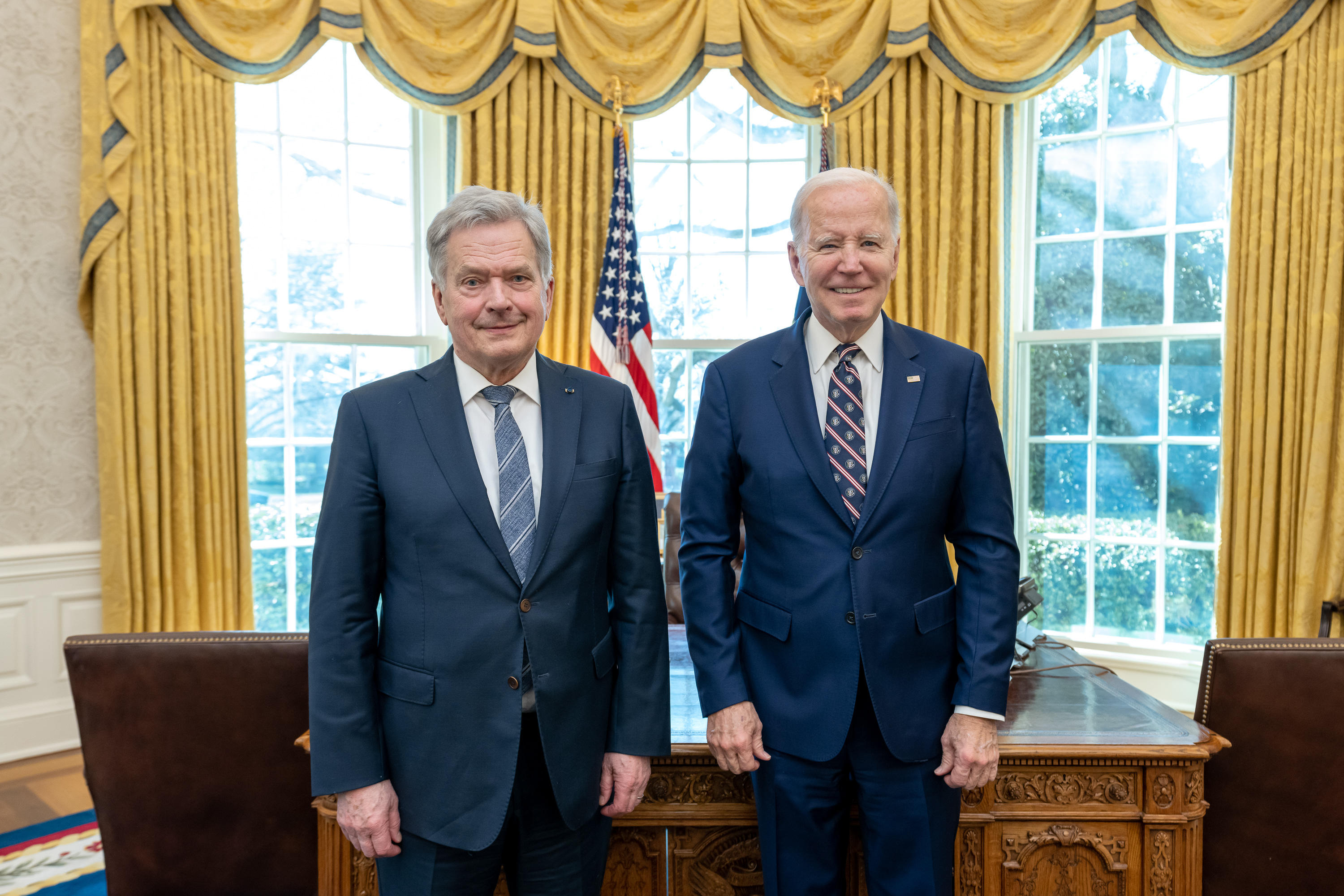

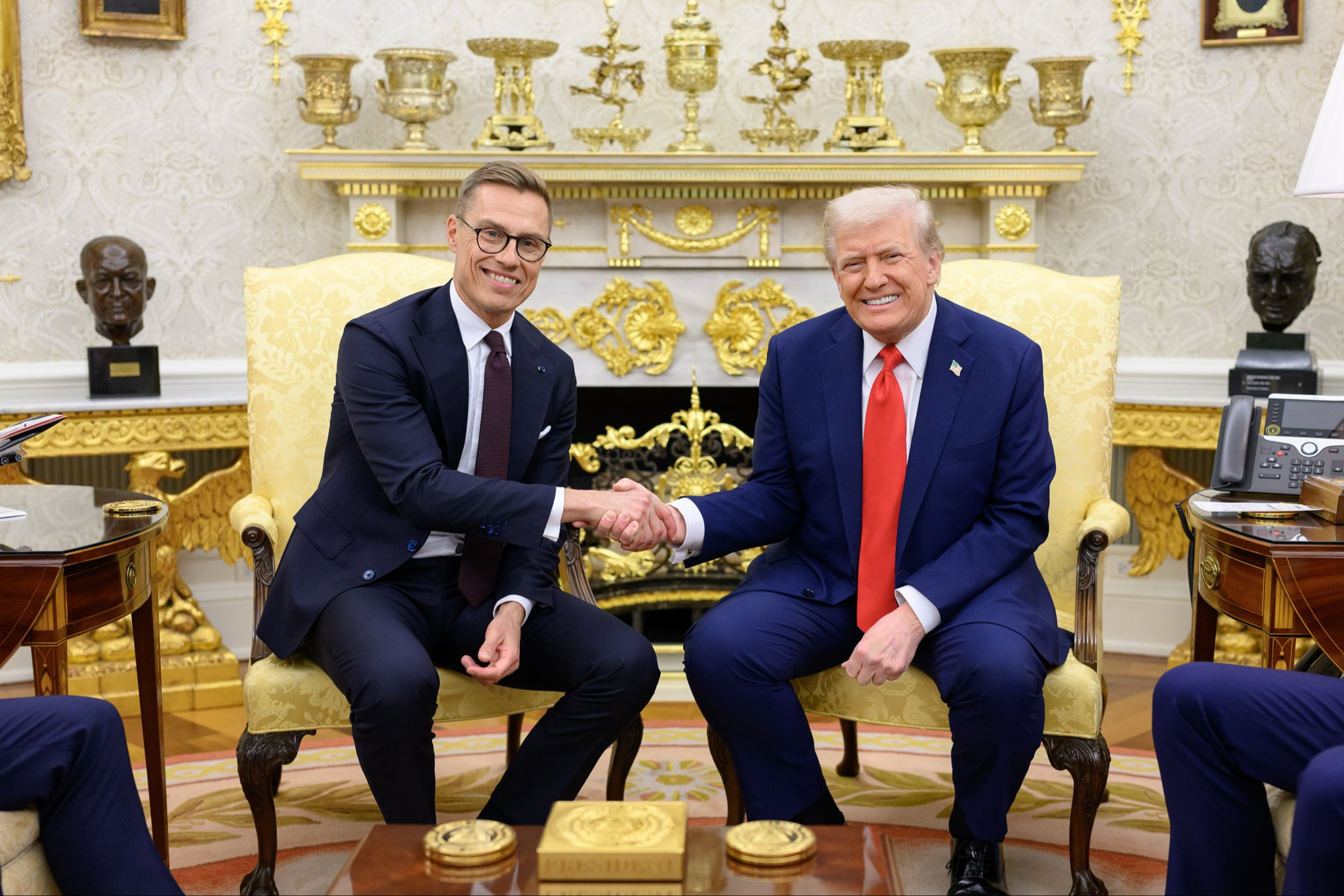

== France ==
Table of Trips
| Start | End | Guest | Title | Reason |
|---|---|---|---|---|
| November 7, 1921 | November 24, 1921 | Aristide Briand | Prime Minister | Attended Conference on the Limitation of Armaments. Departed November 25. |
| October 22, 1931 | October 25, 1931 | Pierre Laval | Prime Minister | At the invitation of President Hoover. Departed U.S. October 27. |
| August 22, 1945 | August 25, 1945 | Charles de Gaulle | President | Afterwards visited New York City and Chicago. Departed U.S. August 28. |
| January 29, 1951 | January 30, 1951 | René Pleven | Prime Minister | At the invitation of the President. Discussed collective security in the Far East and Europe with President Truman. |
| March 28, 1951 | April 2, 1951 | Vincent Auriol | President | Addressed U.S. Congress April 2. Afterwards visited New York City. Departed U.S. April 4. |
| March 25, 1953 | March 28, 1953 | René Mayer | Prime Minister | Official visit. Discussed security measures in the Far East and Europe. |
| October 17, 1954 | October 20, 1954 | Pierre Mendès France | Prime Minister | Discussed European and Far Eastern affairs, visited New York City, and addressed UN General Assembly. Departed U.S. November 23. |
| February 25, 1957 | February 28, 1957 | Guy Mollet | Prime Minister | Official visit. Afterwards visited New York City. Departed U.S. March 2. |
| April 22, 1960 | April 22, 1960 | Charles de Gaulle | President | State visit. Addressed U.S. Congress April 25. Afterwards visited New York City, San Francisco, and New Orleans. Departed U.S. April 29. |
| November 24, 1963 | November 25, 1963 | Charles de Gaulle | President | Attended funeral of President Kennedy. |
| March 31, 1969 | April 1, 1969 | Charles de Gaulle | President | Attended funeral of former President Eisenhower; met with President Nixon March 31 |
| February 23, 1970 | February 26, 1970 | Georges Pompidou | President | State visit. Addressed U.S. Congress February 26. Afterwards visited Cape Kennedy, San Francisco, Chicago, New York City. Departed U.S. March 3. |
| May 17, 1976 | May 20, 1976 | Valéry Giscard d'Estaing | President | State visit; addressed joint session of U.S. Congress May 18; visited Yorktown, Philadelphia, Houston, New Orleans, and Pascagoula. Departed U.S. May 22. |
| June 26, 1976 | June 28, 1976 | Valéry Giscard d'Estaing | President | Attended G-8 Economic Summit Meeting in Dorado, Puerto Rico |
| September 14, 1977 | September 17, 1977 | Raymond Barre | Prime Minister | Official visit. |
| May 26, 1978 | May 31, 1978 | Valéry Giscard d'Estaing | President | Private visit while attending U.N. Special Session on Disarmament. Met with President Carter May 26. |
| October 17, 1981 | October 19, 1981 | François Mitterrand | President | Private visit. Attended Bicentennial ceremonies at Williamsburg and Yorktown |
| March 12, 1982 | March 12, 1982 | François Mitterrand | President | Official working visit. |
| May 28, 1983 | May 31, 1983 | François Mitterrand | President | Attended G-8 Economic Summit Meeting, Williamsburg |
| March 21, 1984 | March 24, 1984 | François Mitterrand | President | State visit; visited Atlanta, San Francisco, Chicago, Peoria, Pittsburgh, and New York City. Departed U.S. March 28. |
| March 30, 1987 | April 1, 1987 | Jacques Chirac | Prime Minister | Official Visit. In New York City March 29. |
| September 29, 1988 | September 29, 1988 | François Mitterrand | President | Official Working Visit. |
| May 20, 1989 | May 21, 1989 | François Mitterrand | President | Met with President Bush at Kennebunkport, and at Boston while receiving an honorary doctorate from Boston University. |
| April 19, 1990 | April 19, 1990 | François Mitterrand | President | Informal meeting with President Bush at Key Largo |
| July 8, 1990 | June 11, 1990 | François Mitterrand | President | Attended G-8 Economic Summit Meeting in Houston |
| January 31, 1992 | January 31, 1992 | François Mitterrand | President | Met with President Bush at the U.N. Security Council in New York City |
| March 9, 1993 | March 9, 1993 | François Mitterrand | President | Met with President Clinton during a private visit. |
| June 15, 1993 | June 15, 1993 | Edouard Balladur | Prime Minister | Met with President Clinton during a private visit. |
| June 14, 1995 | June 15, 1995 | Jacques Chirac | President | Attended U.S.-EU Summit meeting |
| January 31, 1996 | February 2, 1996 | Jacques Chirac | President | State Visit. Addressed Joint Session of Congress. Later visited Chicago. |
| June 20, 1997 | June 22, 1997 | Jacques Chirac | President | Attended G-8 Economic Summit Meeting in Denver |
| June 17, 1998 | June 19, 1998 | Lionel Jospin | Prime Minister | Working visit. Afterwards visited New York City. |
| February 18, 1999 | February 19, 1999 | Jacques Chirac | President | Official working visit. |
| April 23, 1999 | April 25, 1999 | Jacques Chirac | President | Attended NATO's 50th Anniversary Summit. |
| September 7, 2000 | September 7, 2000 | Jacques Chirac | President | Met with President Clinton at the UN Millennium Summit in New York City. |
| December 17, 2000 | December 18, 2000 | Jacques Chirac | President | Attended U.S.-EU Summit meeting |
| September 18, 2001 | September 18, 2001 | Jacques Chirac | President | Working visit. |
| November 6, 2001 | November 6, 2001 | Jacques Chirac | President | Working visit. |
| September 23, 2003 | September 23, 2003 | Jacques Chirac | President | Met with President Bush at the UN General Assembly in New York City. |
| June 8, 2004 | June 10, 2004 | Jacques Chirac | President | Attended G-8 Economic Summit at Sea Island |
| August 19, 2006 | August 19, 2006 | Jacques Chirac | President | Met with President Bush at the UN General Assembly in New York City. |
| August 11, 2007 | August 11, 2007 | Nicolas Sarkozy | President | Working visit. President Bush at Kennebunkport.Arrived in Washington, D.C. August 15. |
| November 6, 2007 | November 7, 2007 | Nicolas Sarkozy | President | Working visit. Addressed joint meeting of Congress. Also visited Mount Vernon. |
| October 18, 2008 | October 18, 2008 | Nicolas Sarkozy | President | Met with President Bush at Camp David. Accompanied by President Barroso of the European Commission. |
| November 14, 2008 | November 15, 2008 | Nicolas Sarkozy | President | Attended the G-20 Economic Summit meeting. |
| September 24, 2009 | September 25, 2009 | Nicolas Sarkozy | President | Attended the G-20 Economic Summit meeting in Pittsburgh |
| March 30, 2010 | March 30, 2010 | Nicolas Sarkozy | President | Working visit. |
| April 12, 2010 | April 13, 2010 | Nicolas Sarkozy | President | Attended the Nuclear Security Summit. |
| January 9, 2011 | January 10, 2011 | Nicolas Sarkozy | President | Working visit. |
| September 21, 2011 | September 21, 2011 | Nicolas Sarkozy | President | Met with President Obama at the U.N. General Assembly. |
| May 18, 2012 | May 19, 2012 | François Hollande | President | Attended the G-8 Economic Summit at Camp David. |
| May 20, 2012 | May 21, 2012 | François Hollande | President | Attended the NATO Summit meeting in Chicago. |
| February 9, 2014 | February 11, 2014 | François Hollande | President | State visit. Visited Monticello in Charlottesville, Virginia on February 10. |
| November 24, 2015 | November 24, 2015 | François Hollande | President | Official Working visit. |
| March 31, 2016 | April 1, 2016 | François Hollande | President | Attended the Nuclear Security Summit. |
| April 23, 2018 | April 25, 2018 | Emmanuel Macron | President | State Visit. |
| September 21, 2022 | September 21, 2022 | Emmanuel Macron | President | Met with President Biden at the UN General Assembly Meeting in New York City. |
| December 1, 2022 | December 1, 2022 | Emmanuel Macron | President | State Visit. |
| July 10, 2024 | July 11, 2024 | Emmanuel Macron | President | Attended NATO 75th Anniversary Summit in Washington, D.C. |
| February 24, 2025 | February 24, 2025 | Emmanuel Macron | President | Official Working visit. |

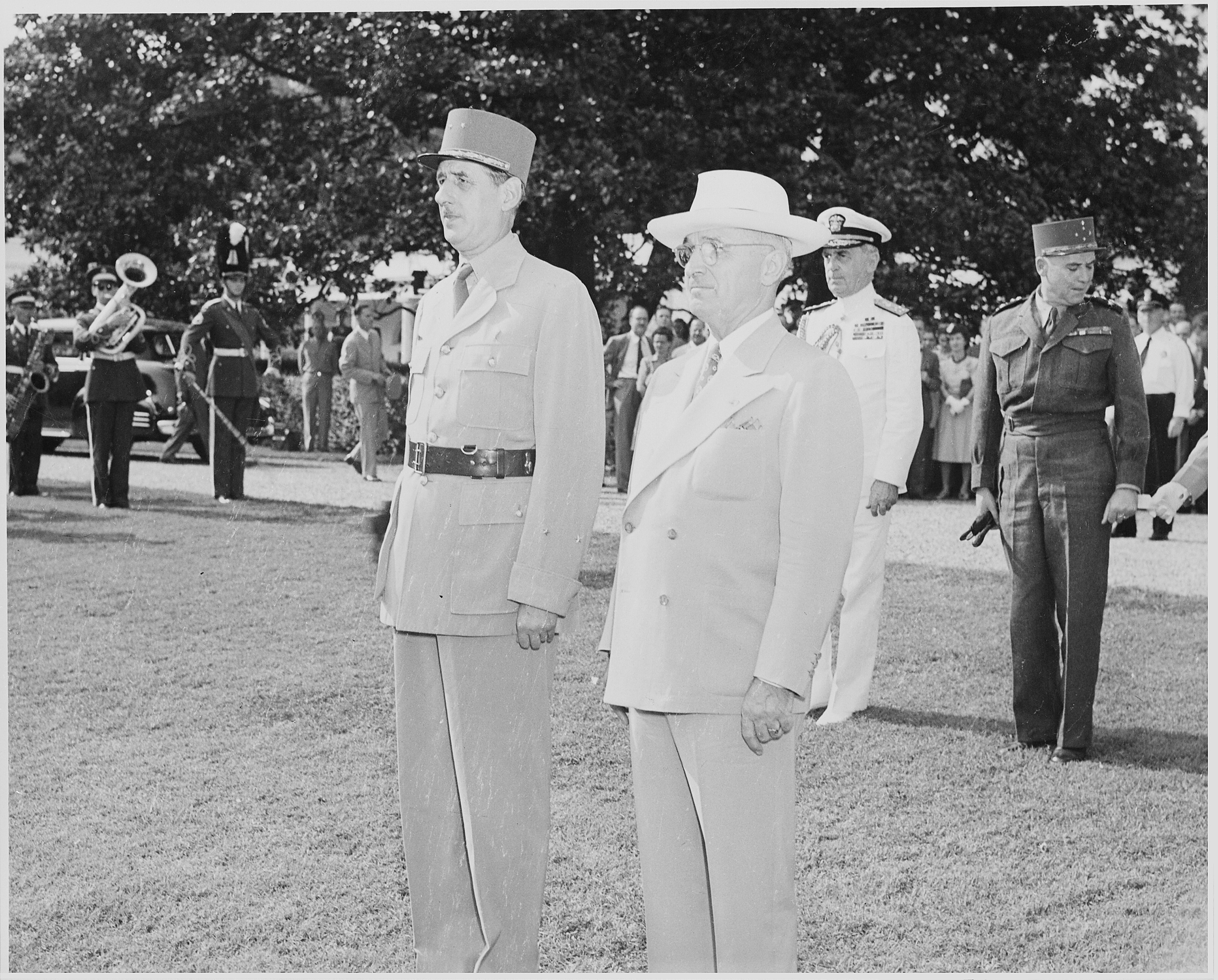

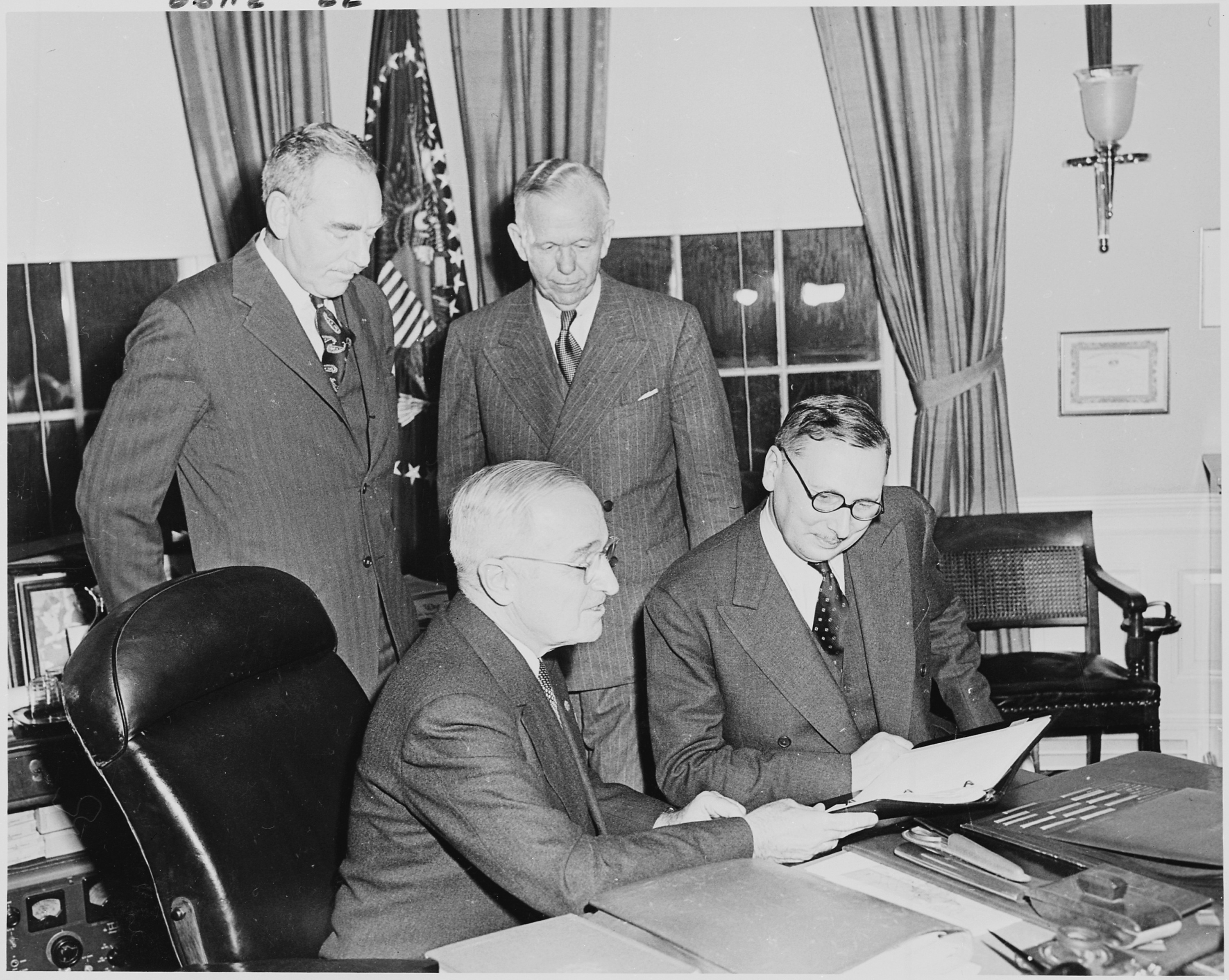

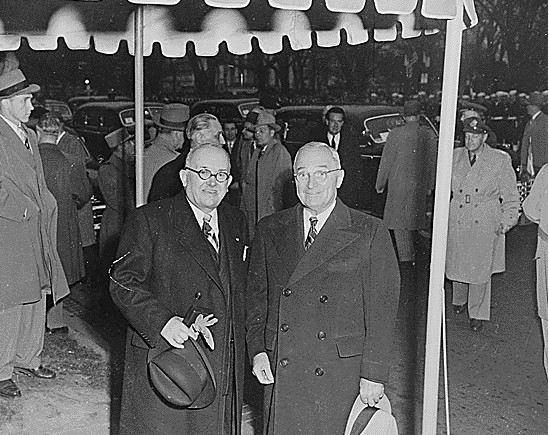

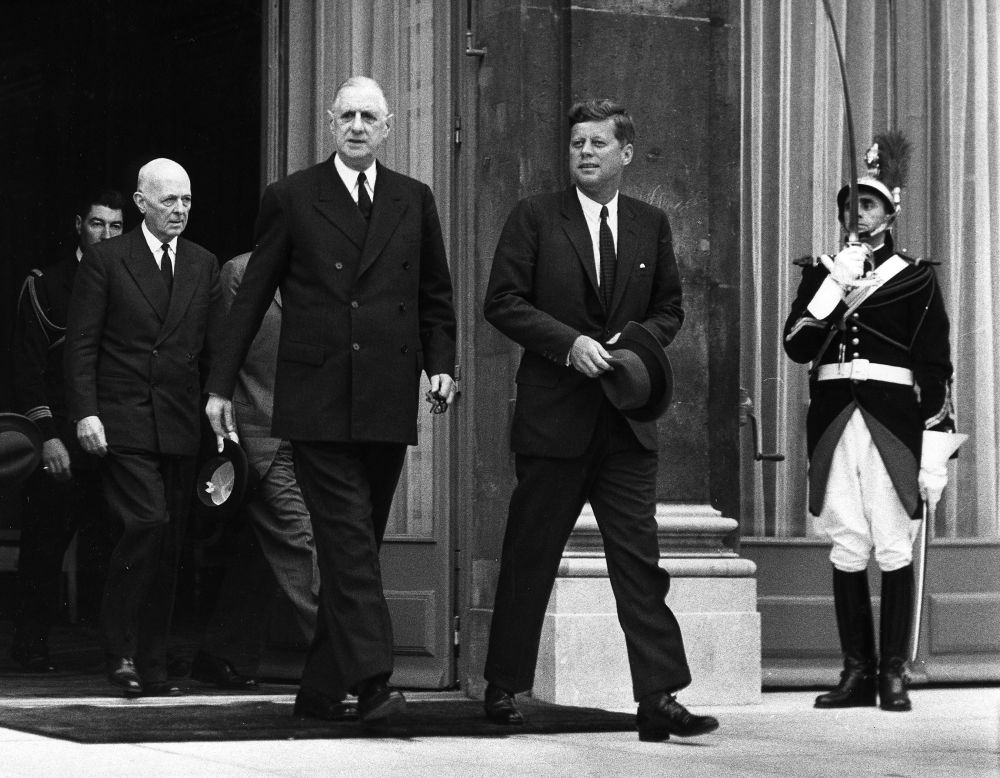

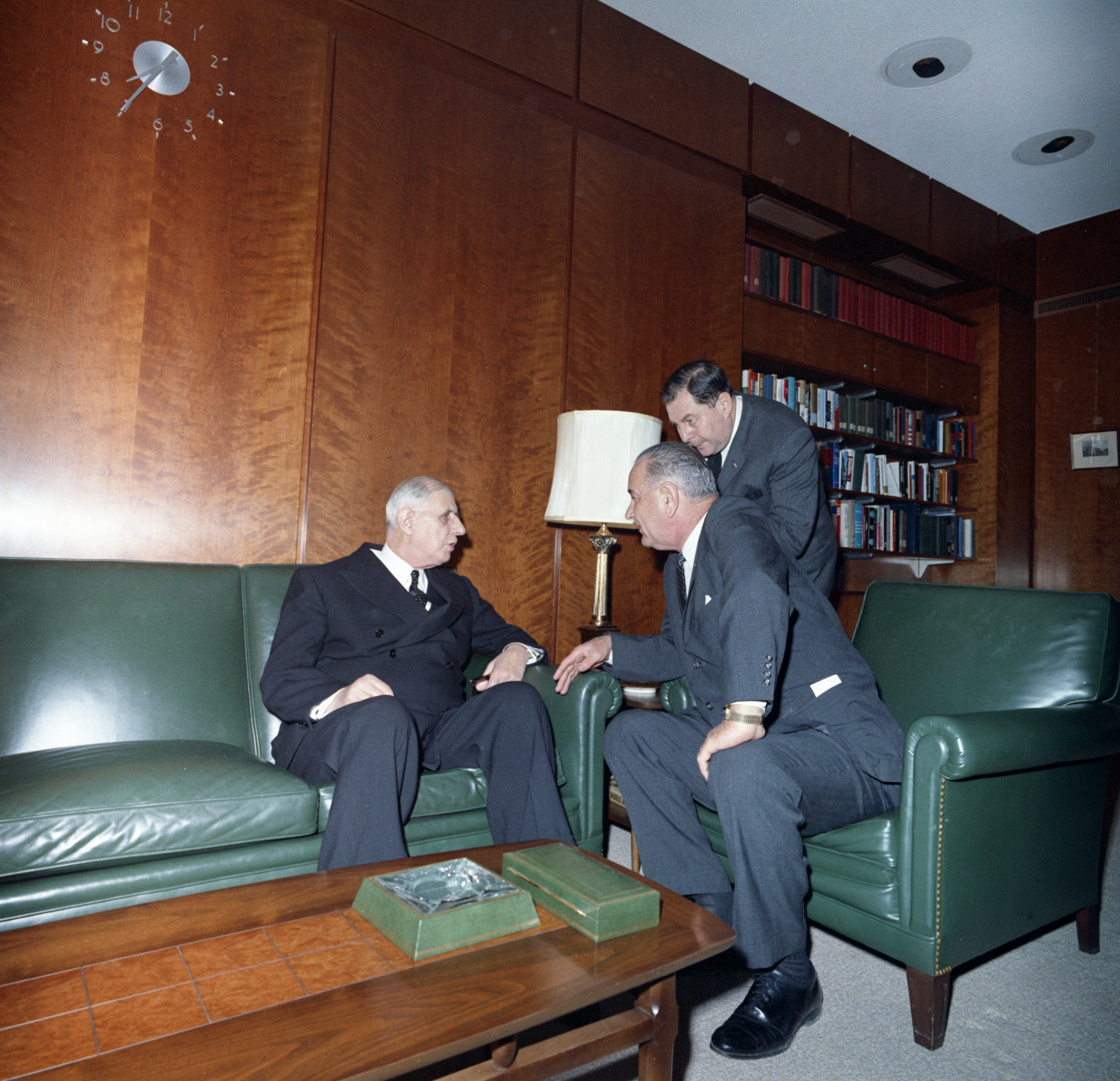

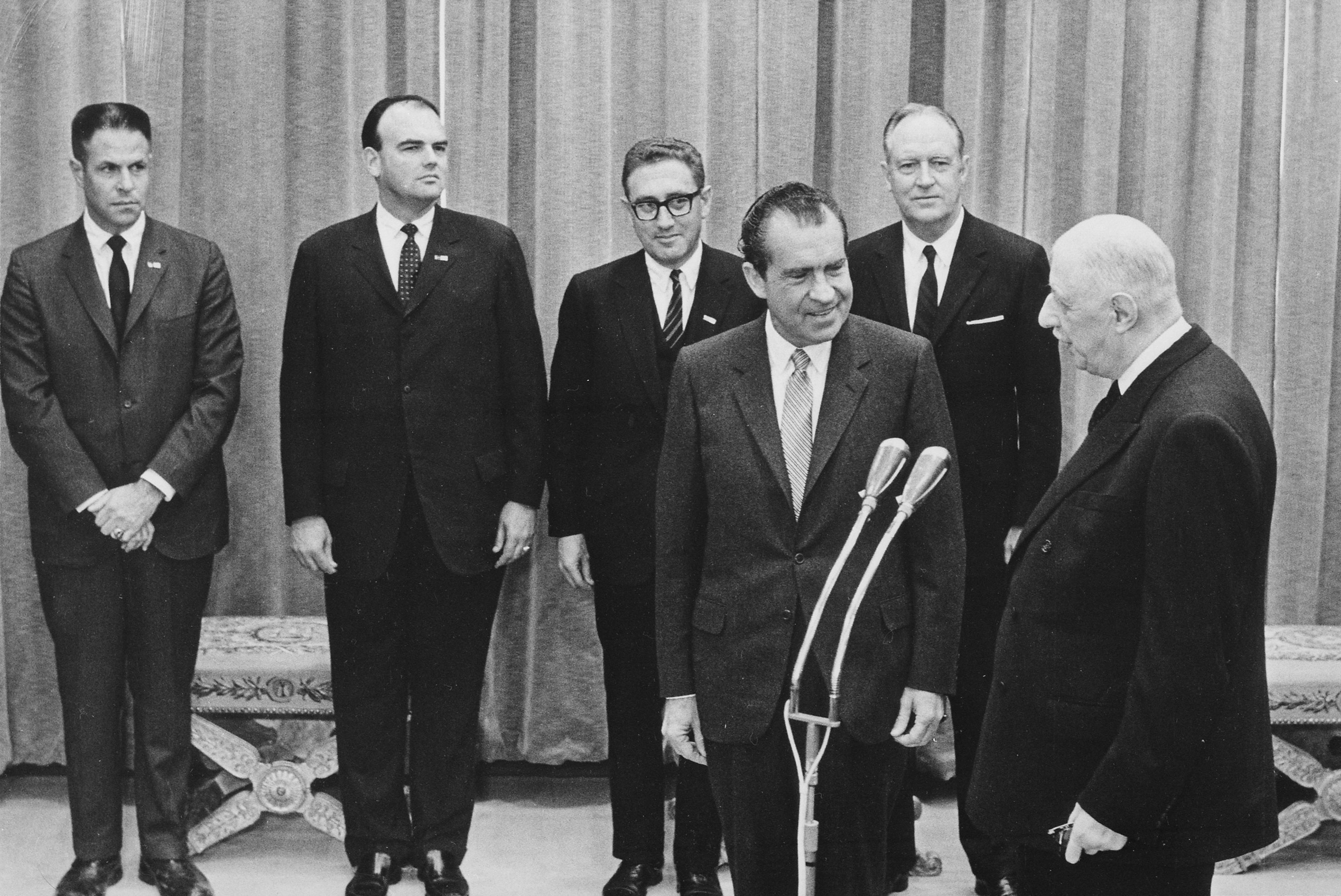

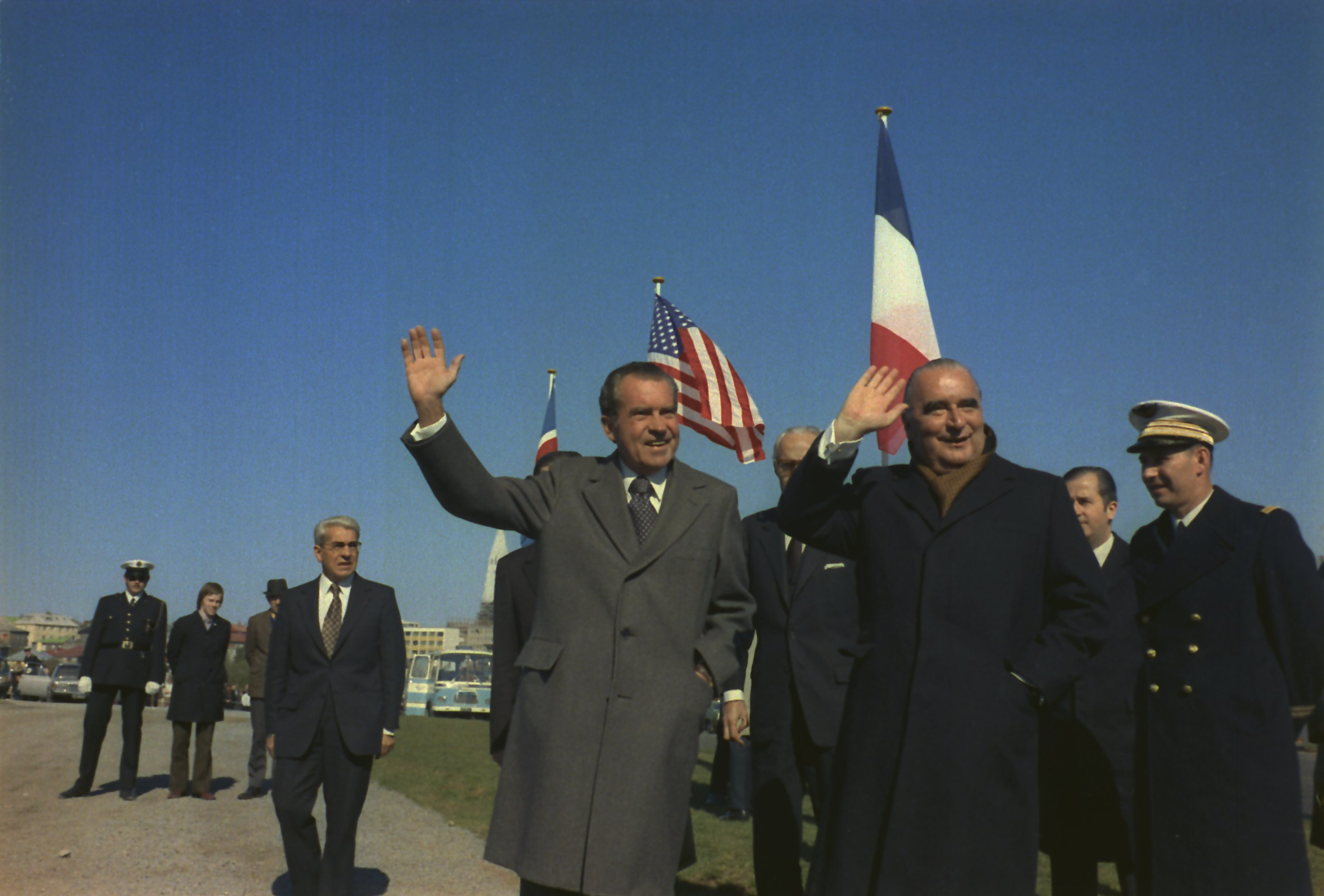

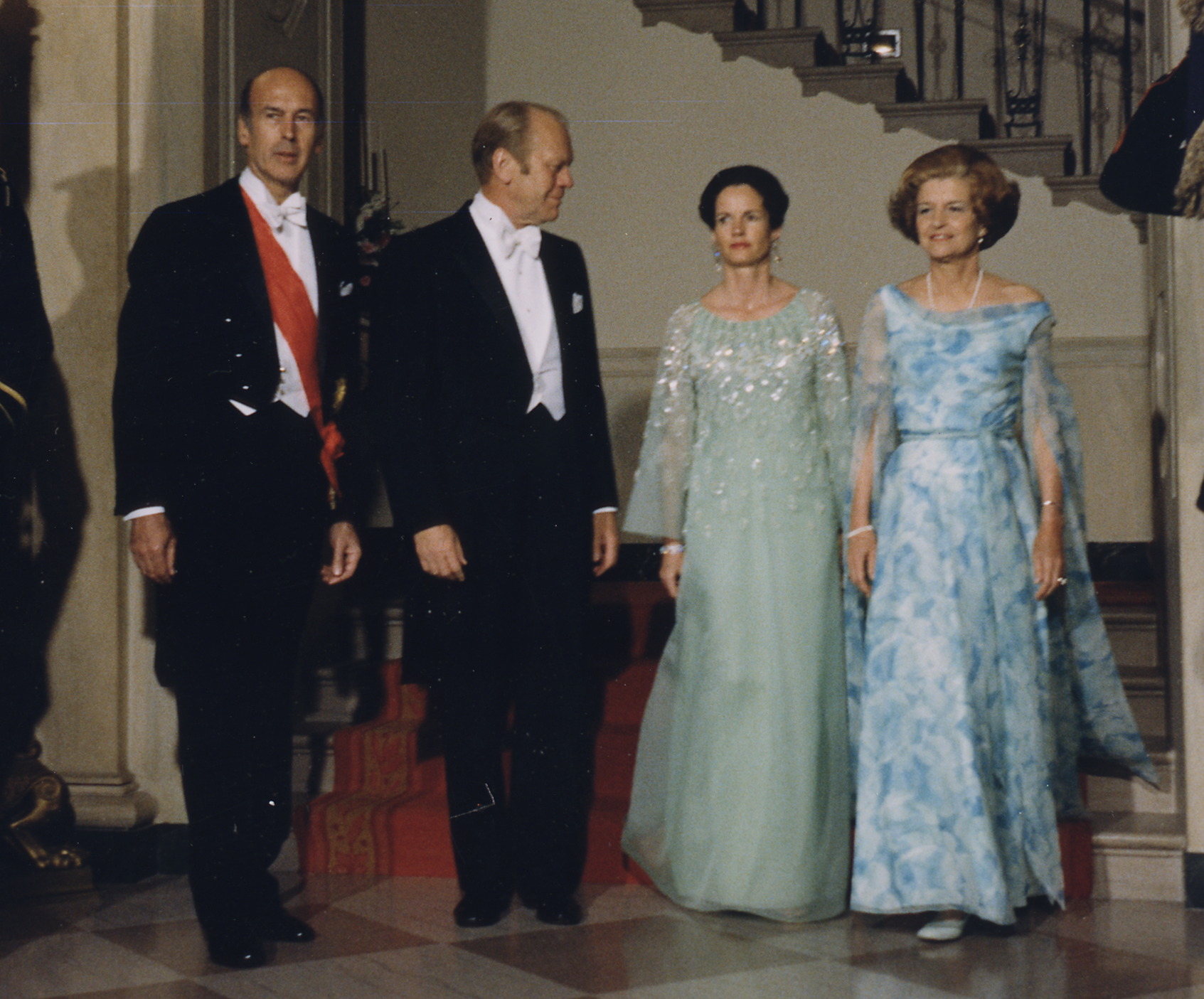

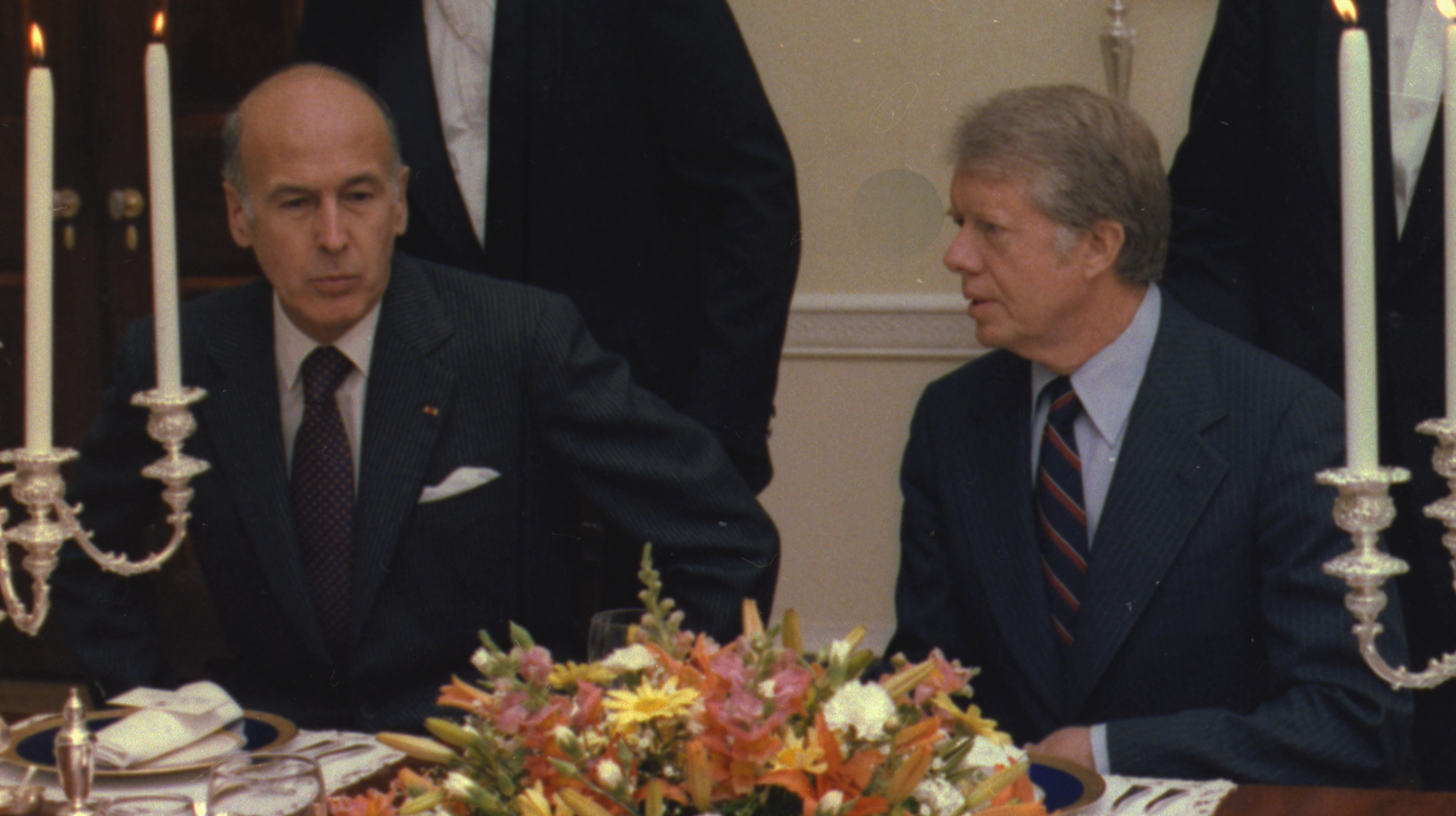

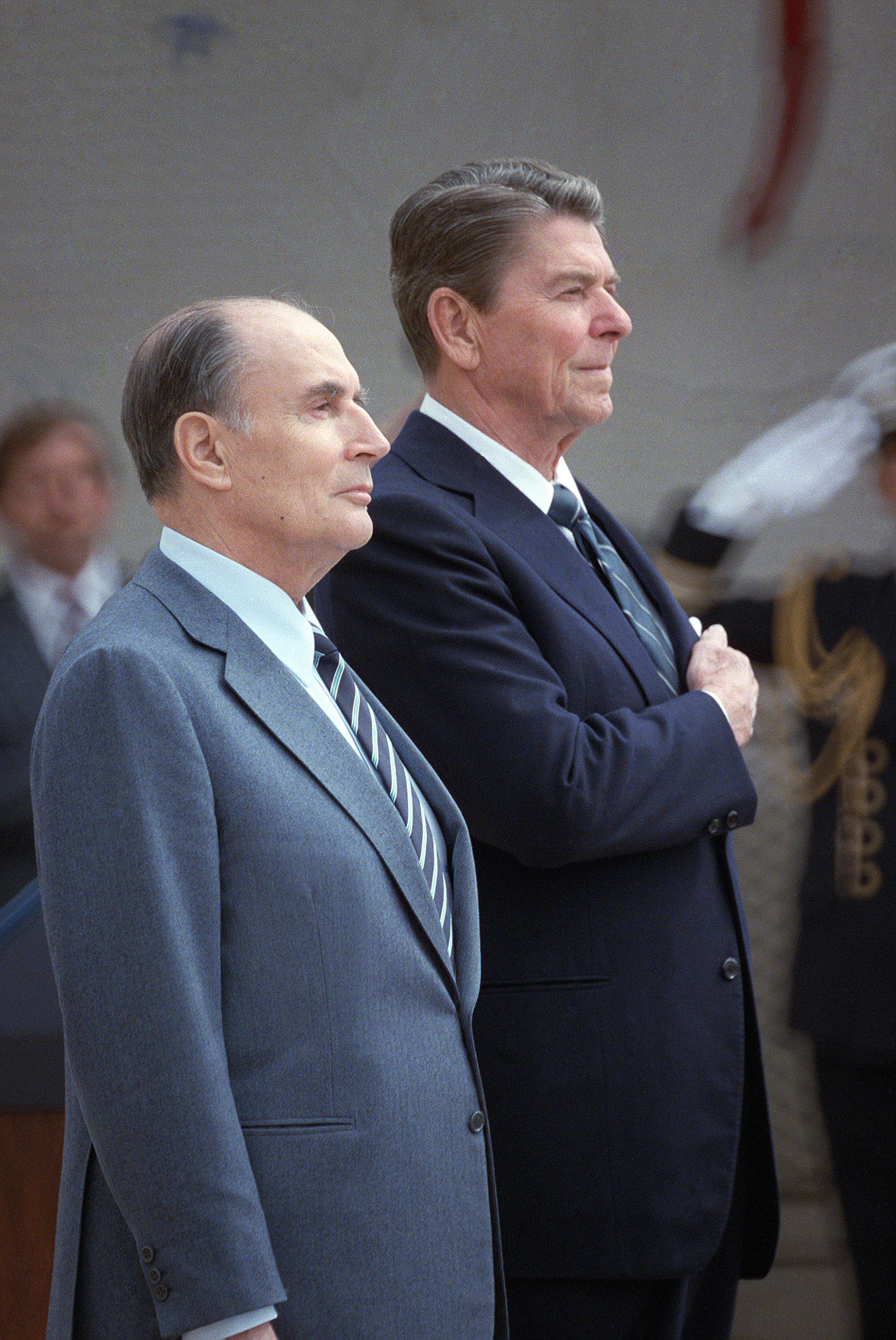

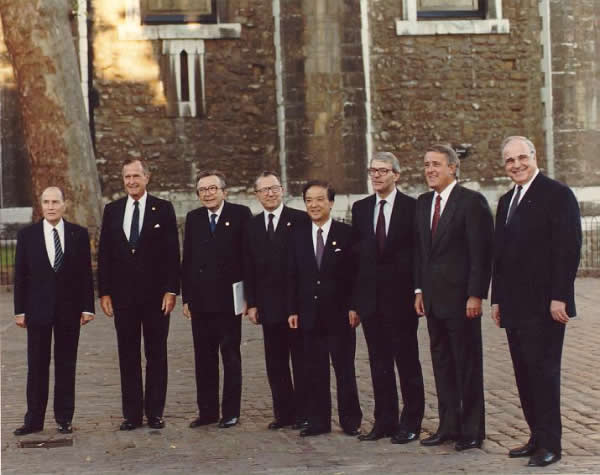

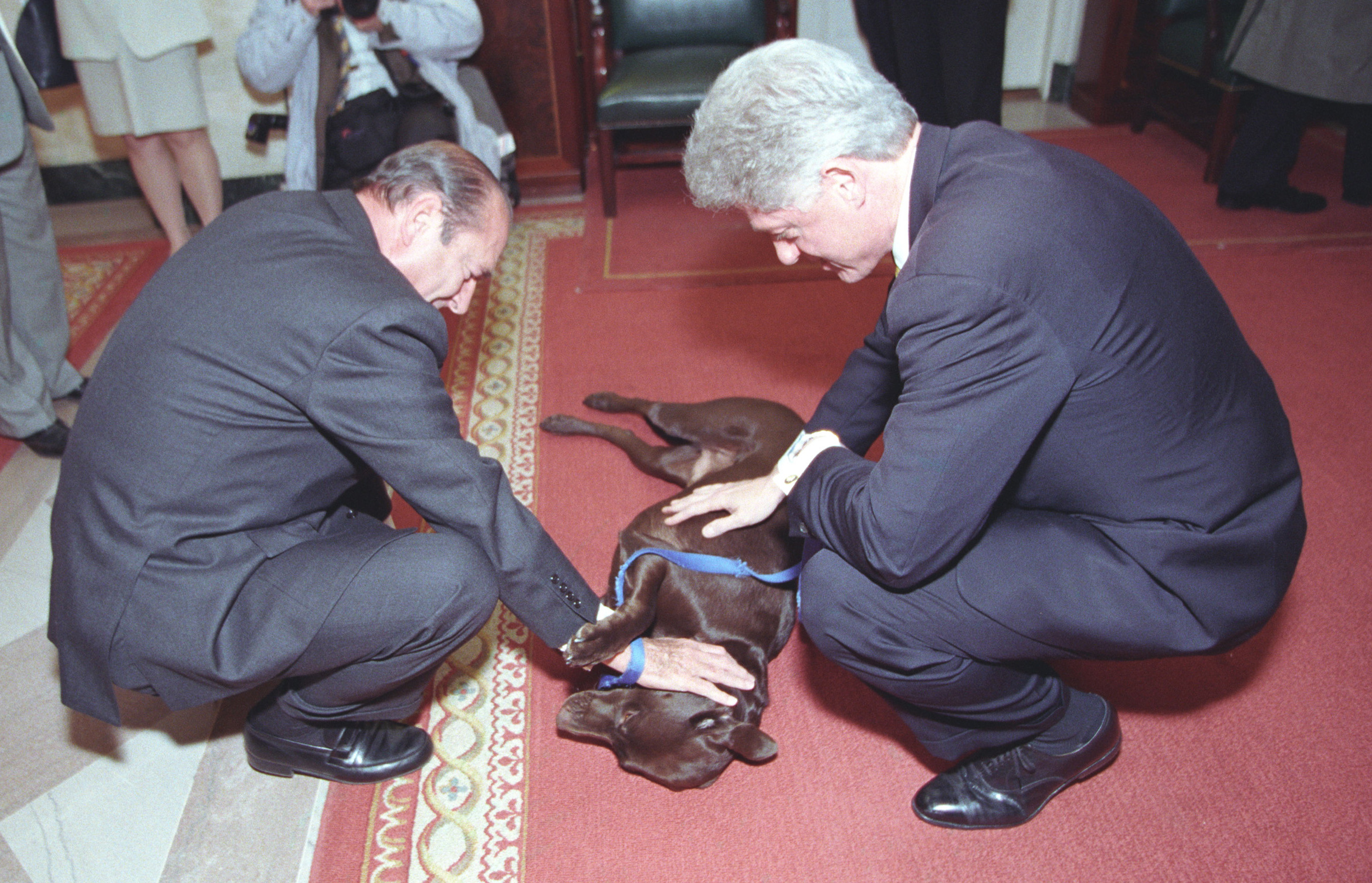

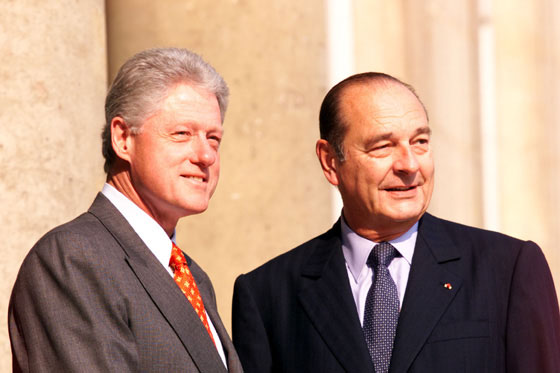

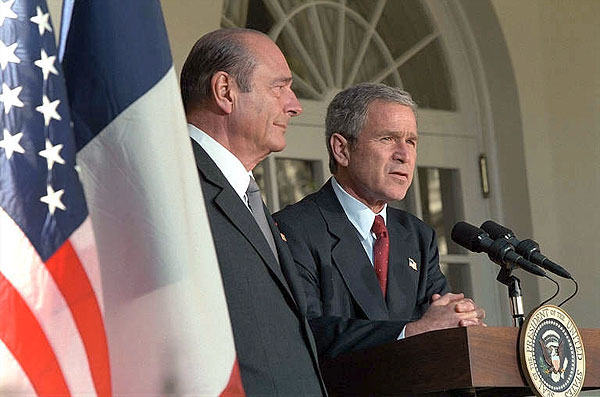

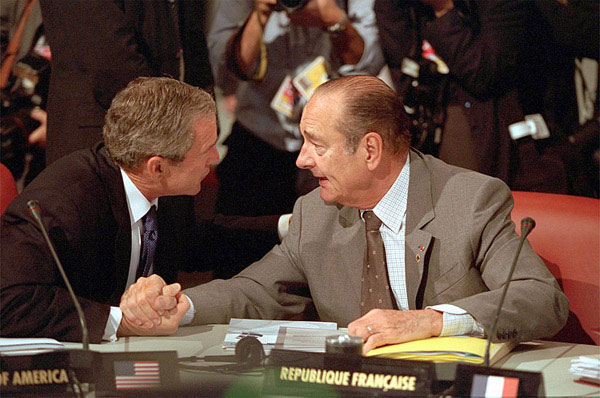

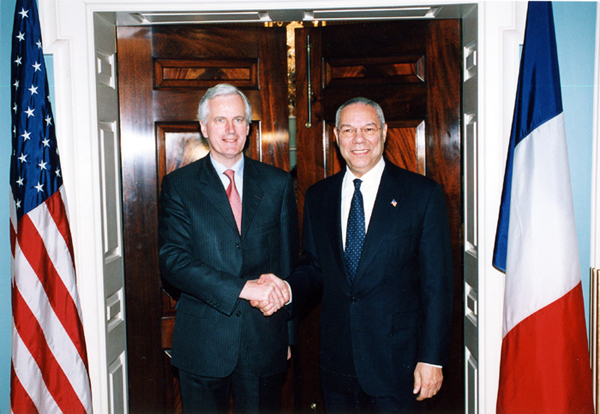

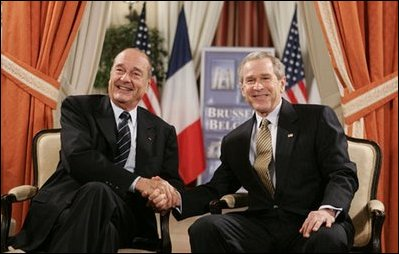

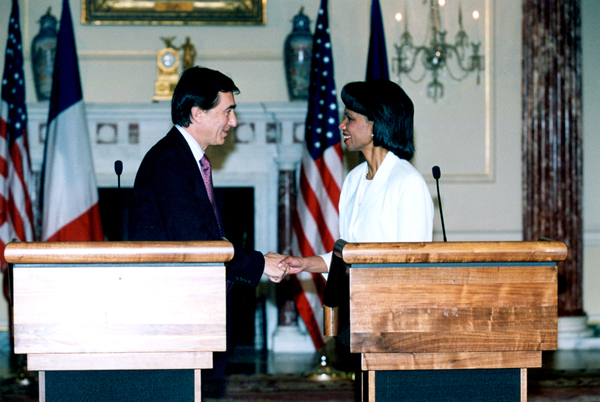

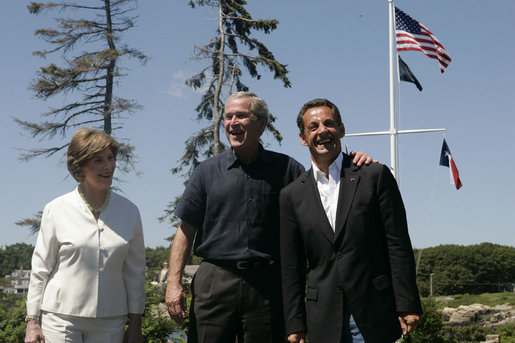

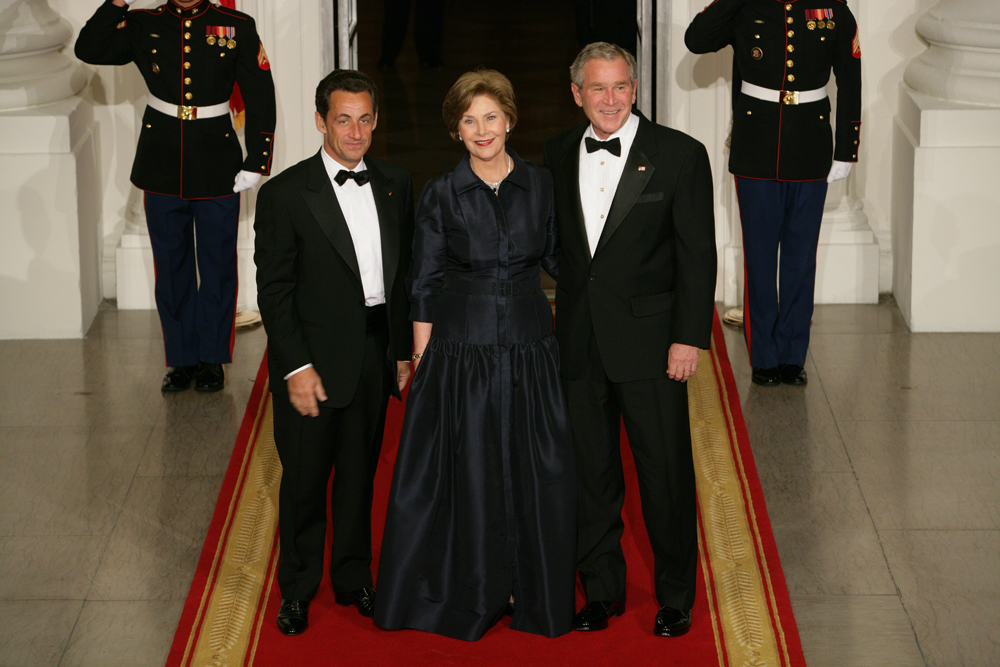

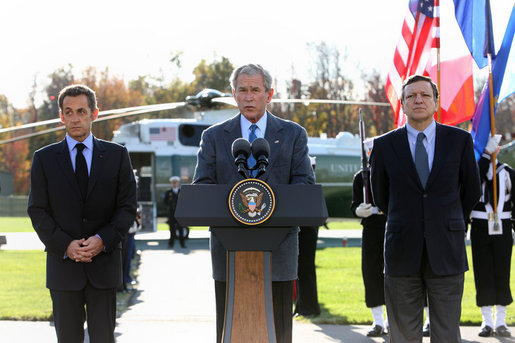

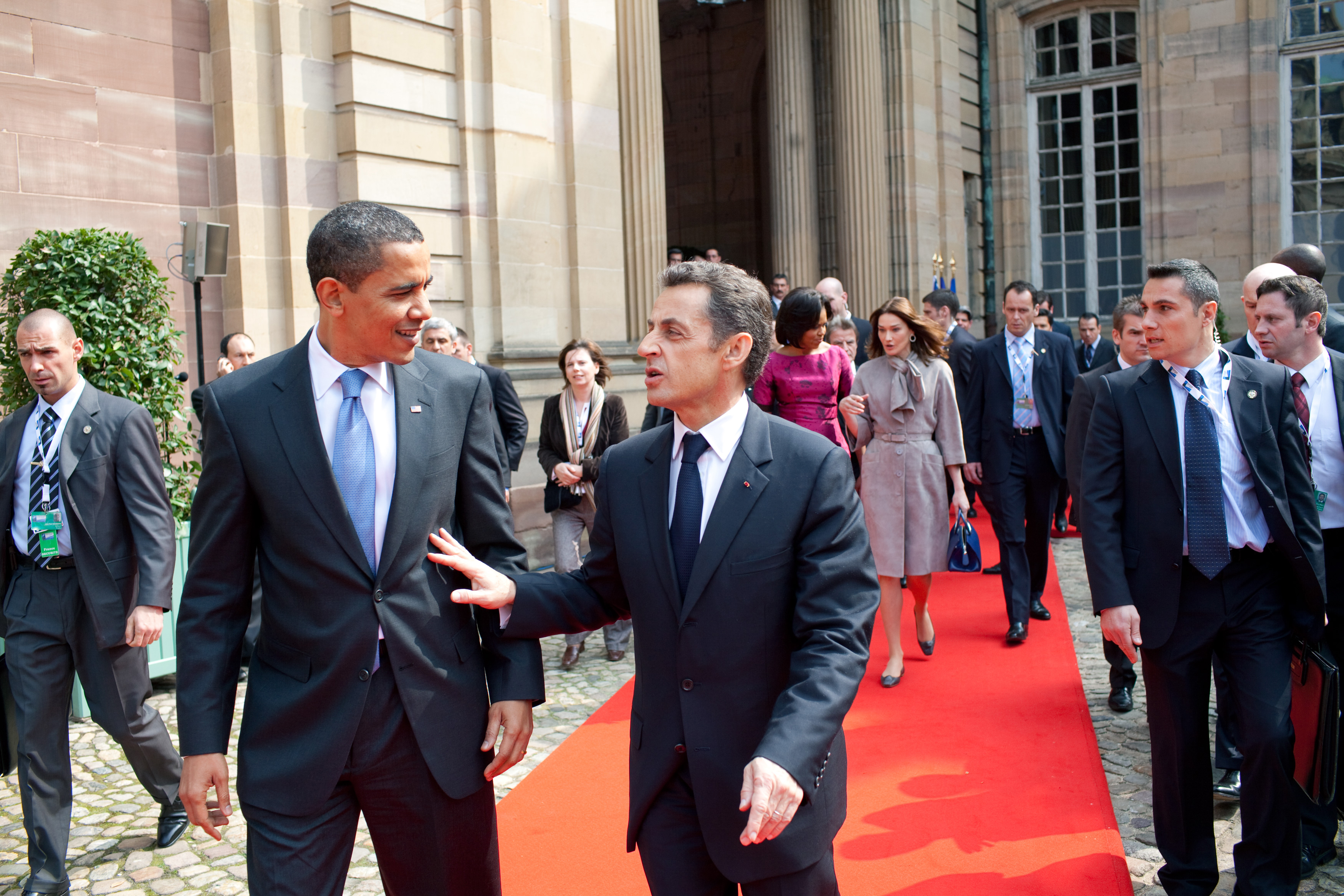

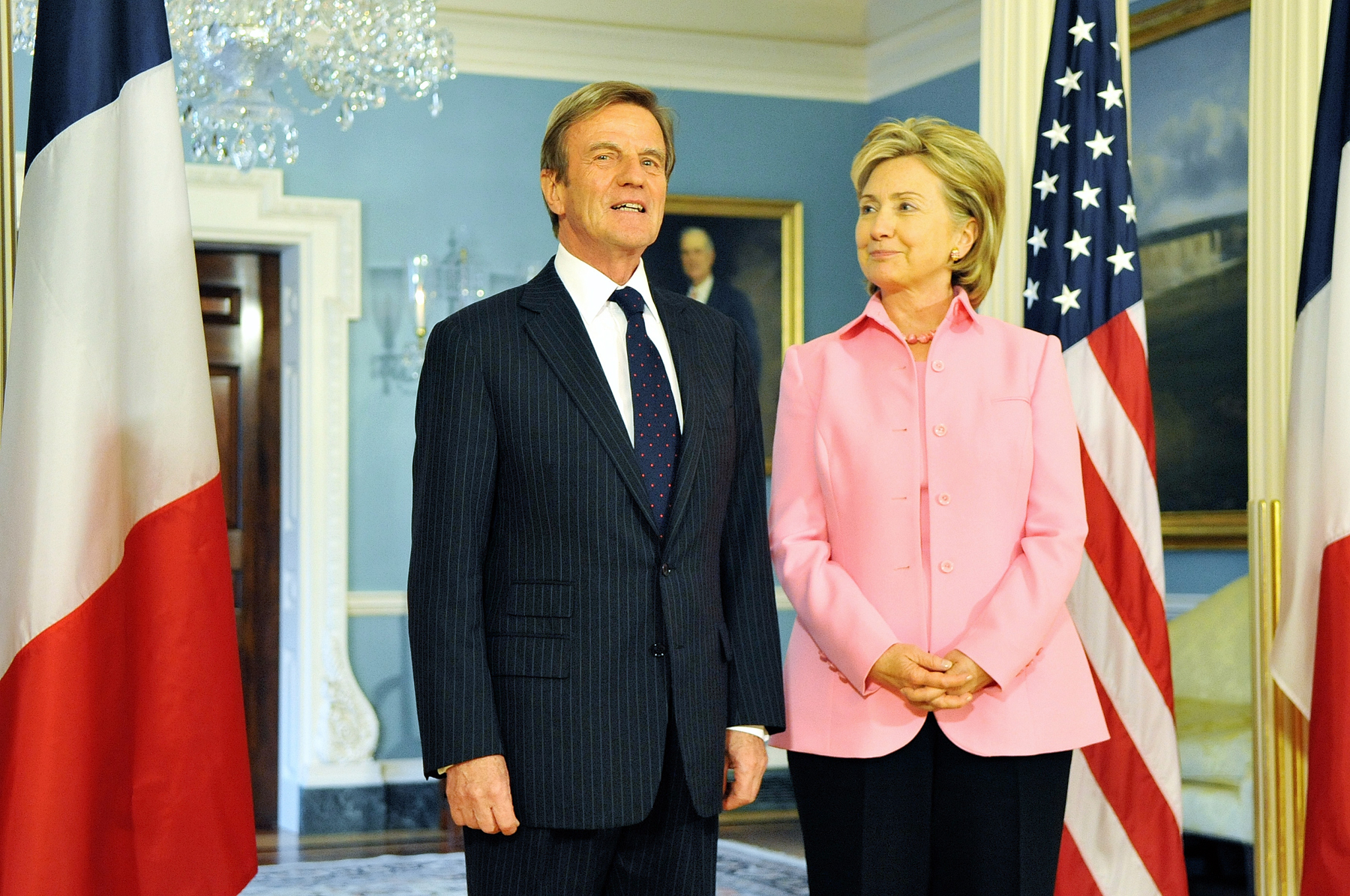

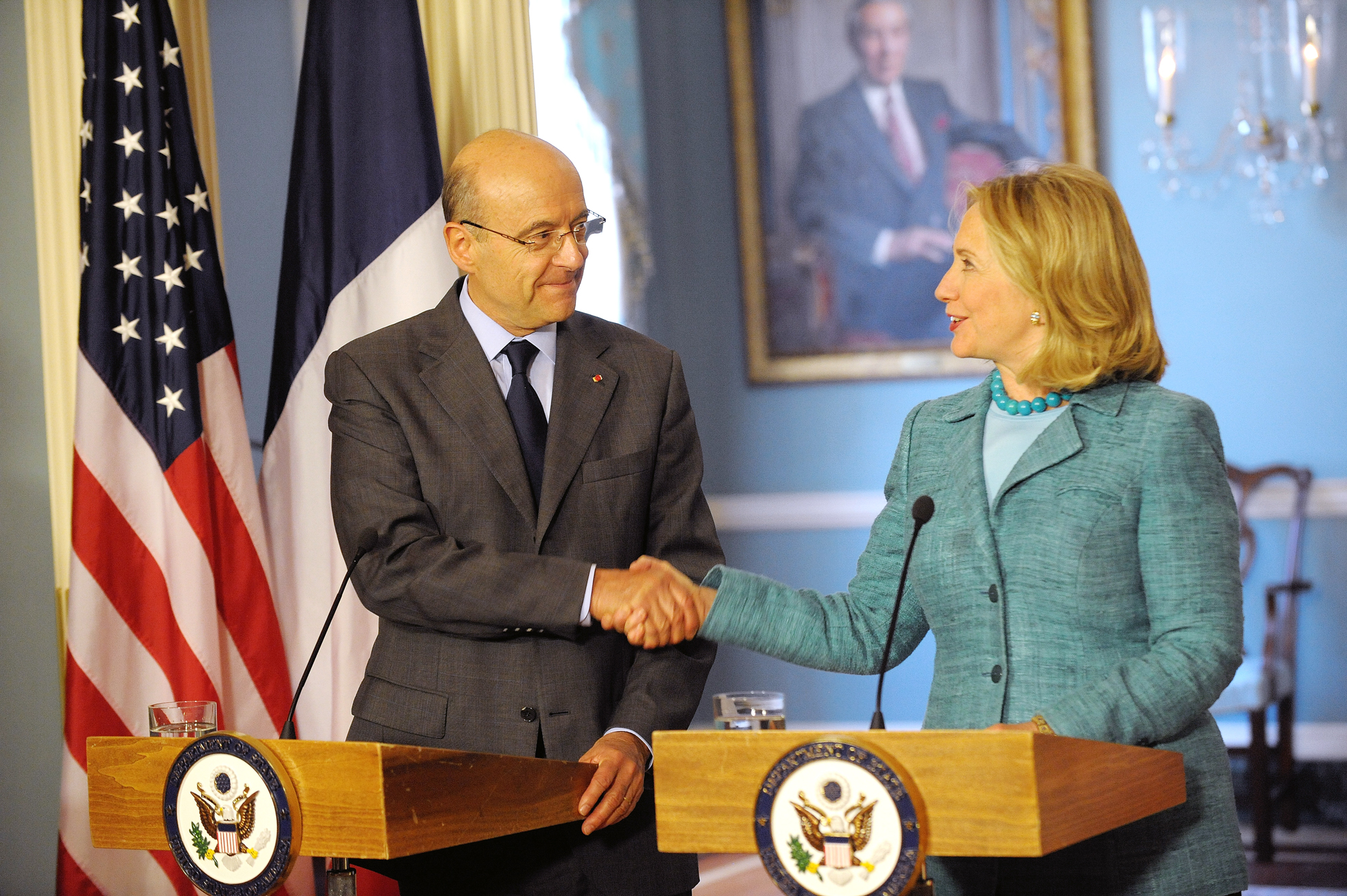

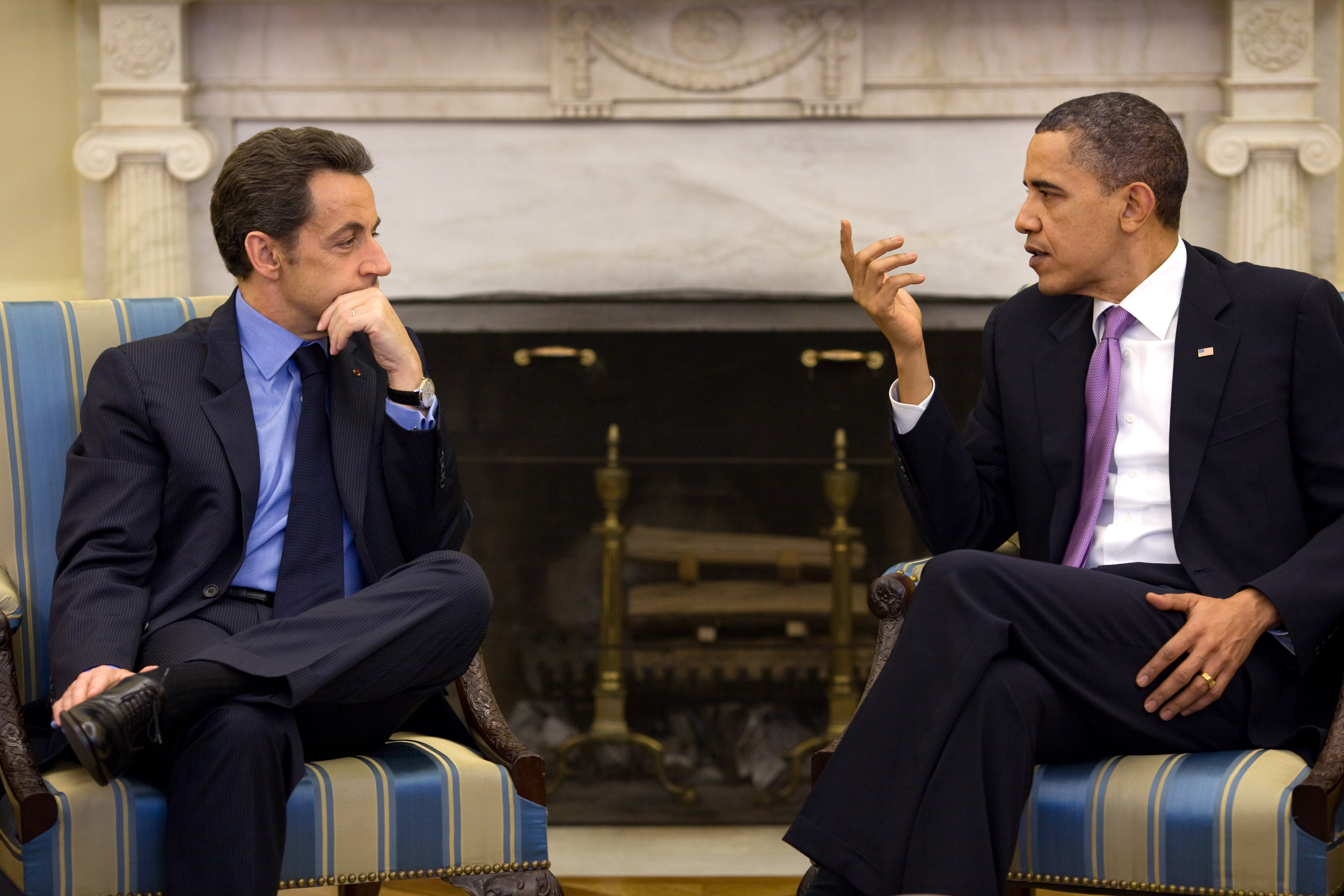

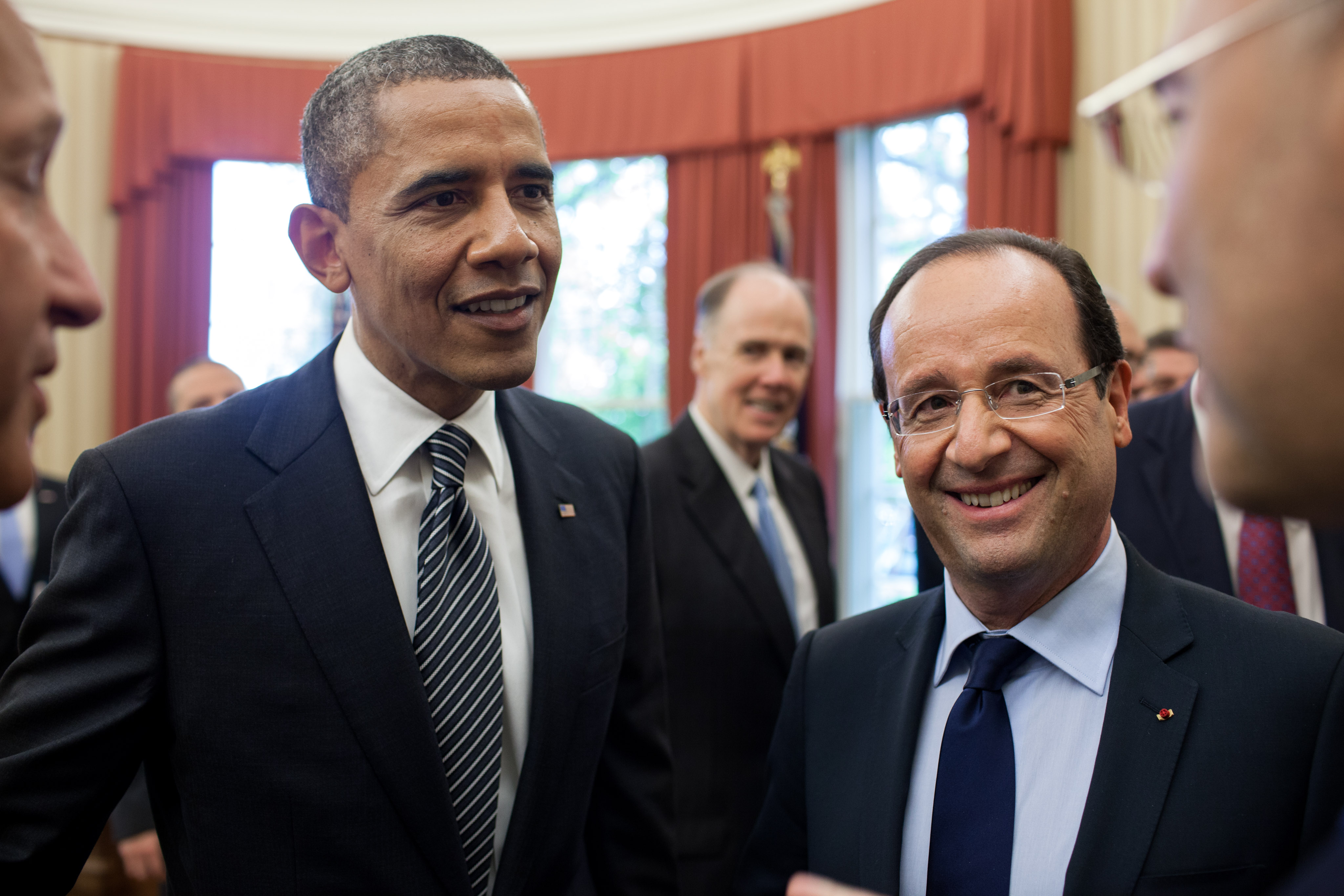

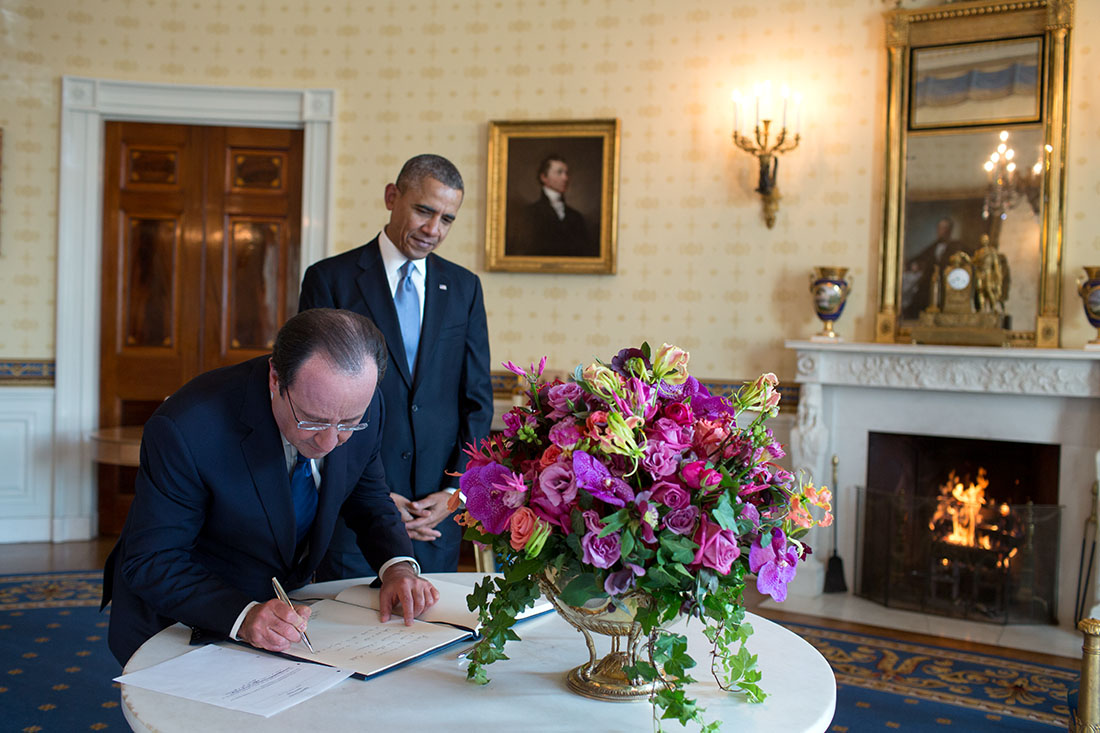

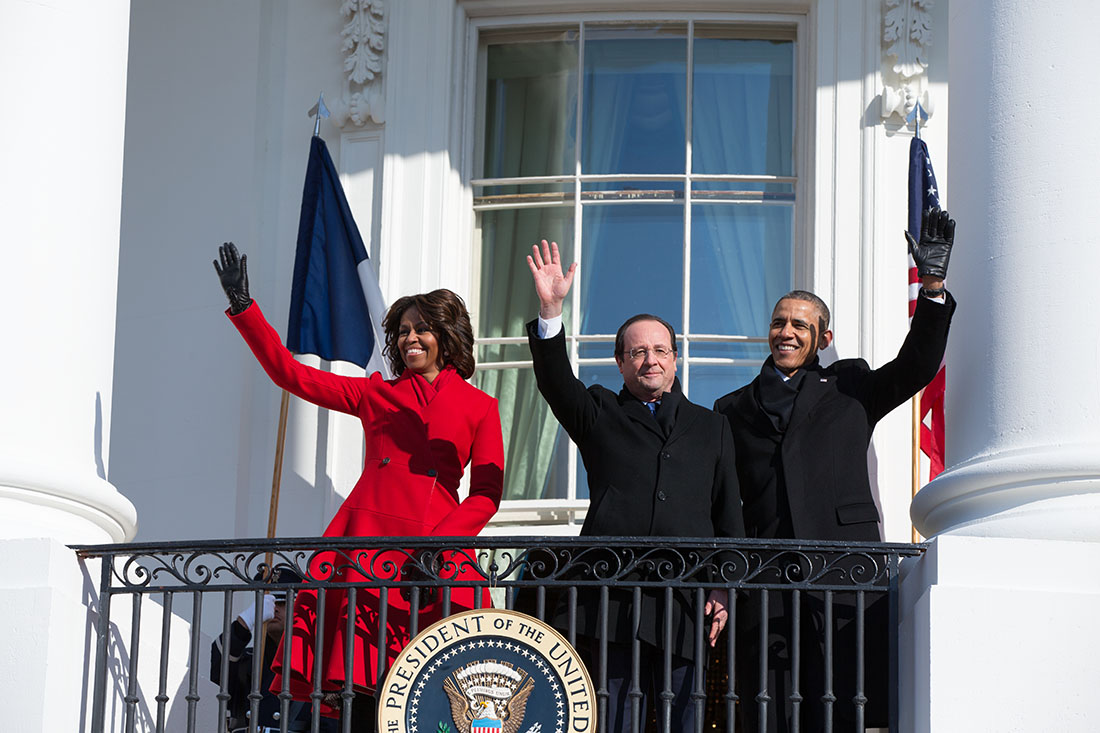

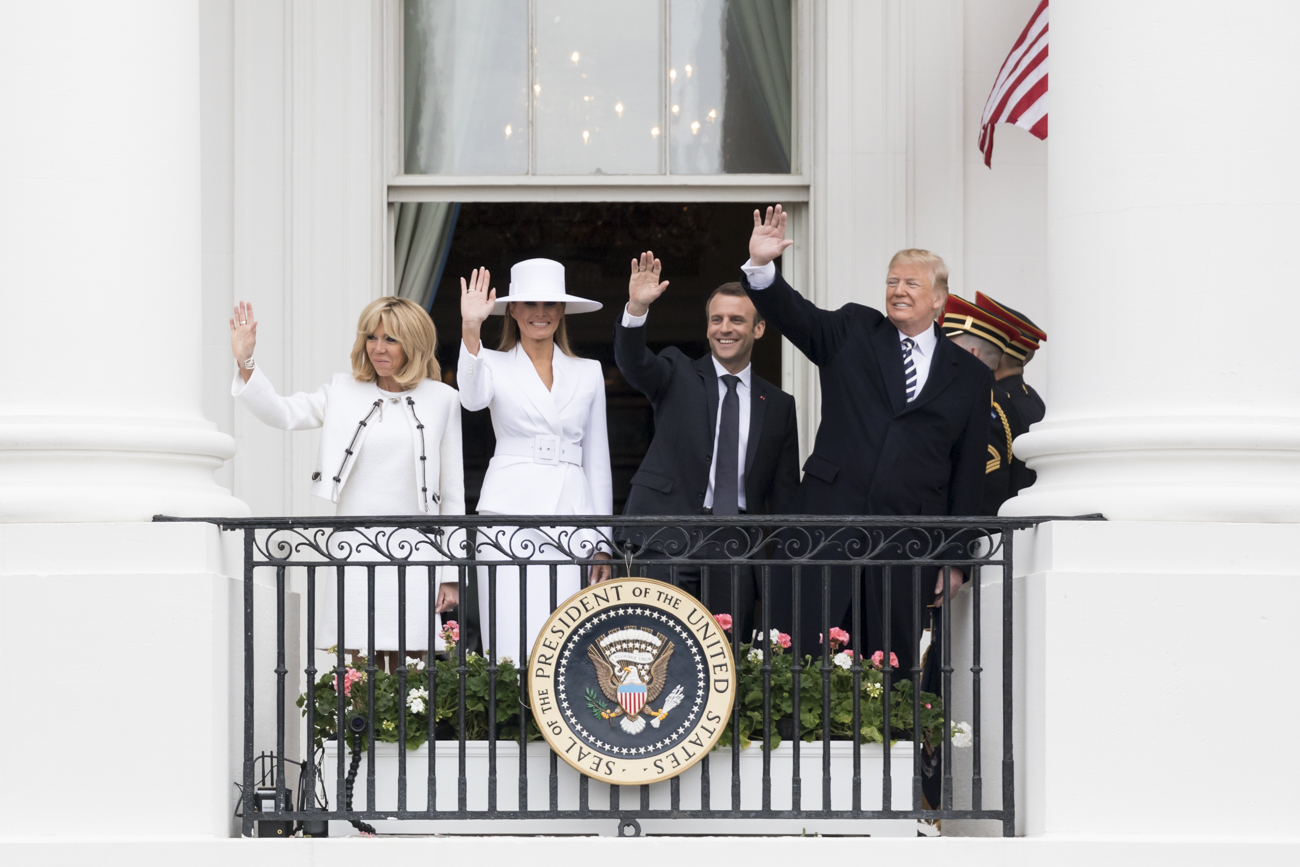

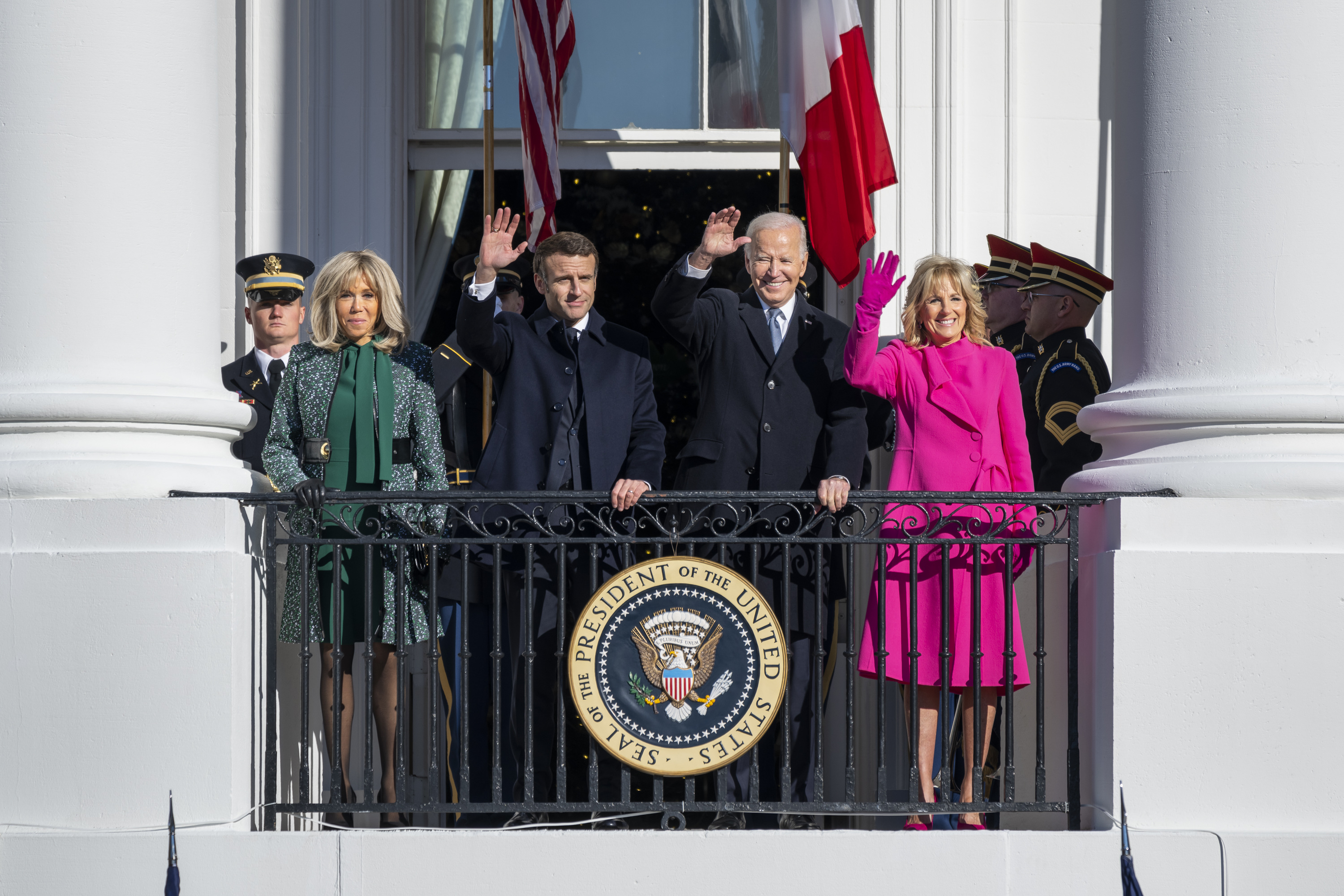

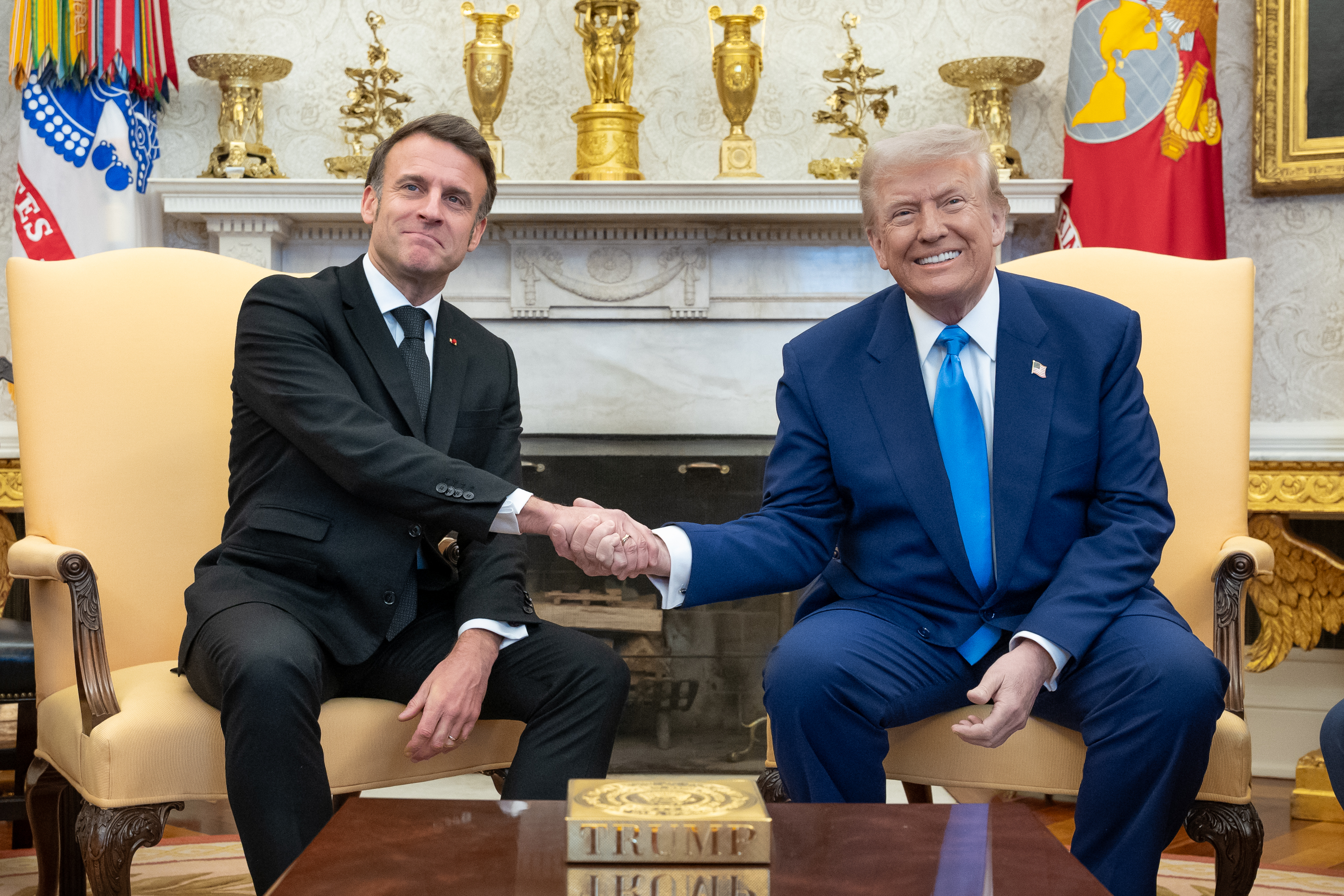

== Georgia ==
Table of Trips
| Start | End | Guest | Title | Reason |
|---|---|---|---|---|
| March 6, 1994 | March 8, 1994 | Eduard Shevardnadze | President | Working visit. |
| July 16, 1997 | July 20, 1997 | Eduard Shevardnadze | President | Working visit. |
| April 23, 1999 | April 26, 1999 | Eduard Shevardnadze | President | Attended NATO's 50th Anniversary Summit and discussed the Caucasus situation. |
| September 22, 1999 | September 23, 1999 | Eduard Shevardnadze | President | Private visit. |
| November 3, 2001 | November 5, 2001 | Eduard Shevardnadze | President | Working visit. |
| February 22, 2004 | February 26, 2004 | Mikheil Saakashvili | President | Working visit. |
| July 2, 2006 | July 6, 2006 | Mikheil Saakashvili | President | Working visit. |
| March 18, 2008 | March 20, 2008 | Mikheil Saakashvili | President | Working visit. |
| April 12, 2010 | April 13, 2010 | Mikheil Saakashvili | President | Attended the Nuclear Security Summit. |
| January 14, 2011 | January 14, 2011 | Mikheil Saakashvili | President | Attended the Richard Holbrooke Memorial Service. |
| January 30, 2012 | February 1, 2012 | Mikheil Saakashvili | President | Working visit. |
| May 20, 2012 | May 21, 2012 | Mikheil Saakashvili | President | Attended the NATO Summit meeting in Chicago |
| February 24, 2014 | February 26, 2014 | Irakli Garibashvili | Prime Minister | Working visit. |
| March 31, 2016 | April 1, 2016 | Giorgi Margvelashvili | President | Attended the Nuclear Security Summit. |
| April 27, 2022 | April 27, 2022 | Salome Zourabichvili | President | Attended the Madeleine Albright Memorial Service |

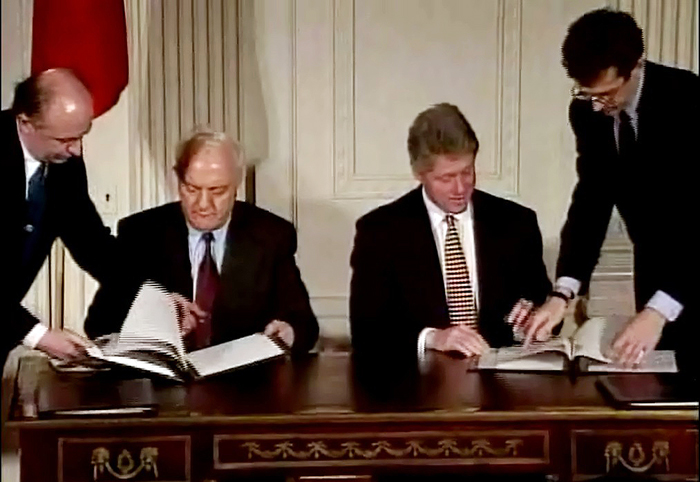

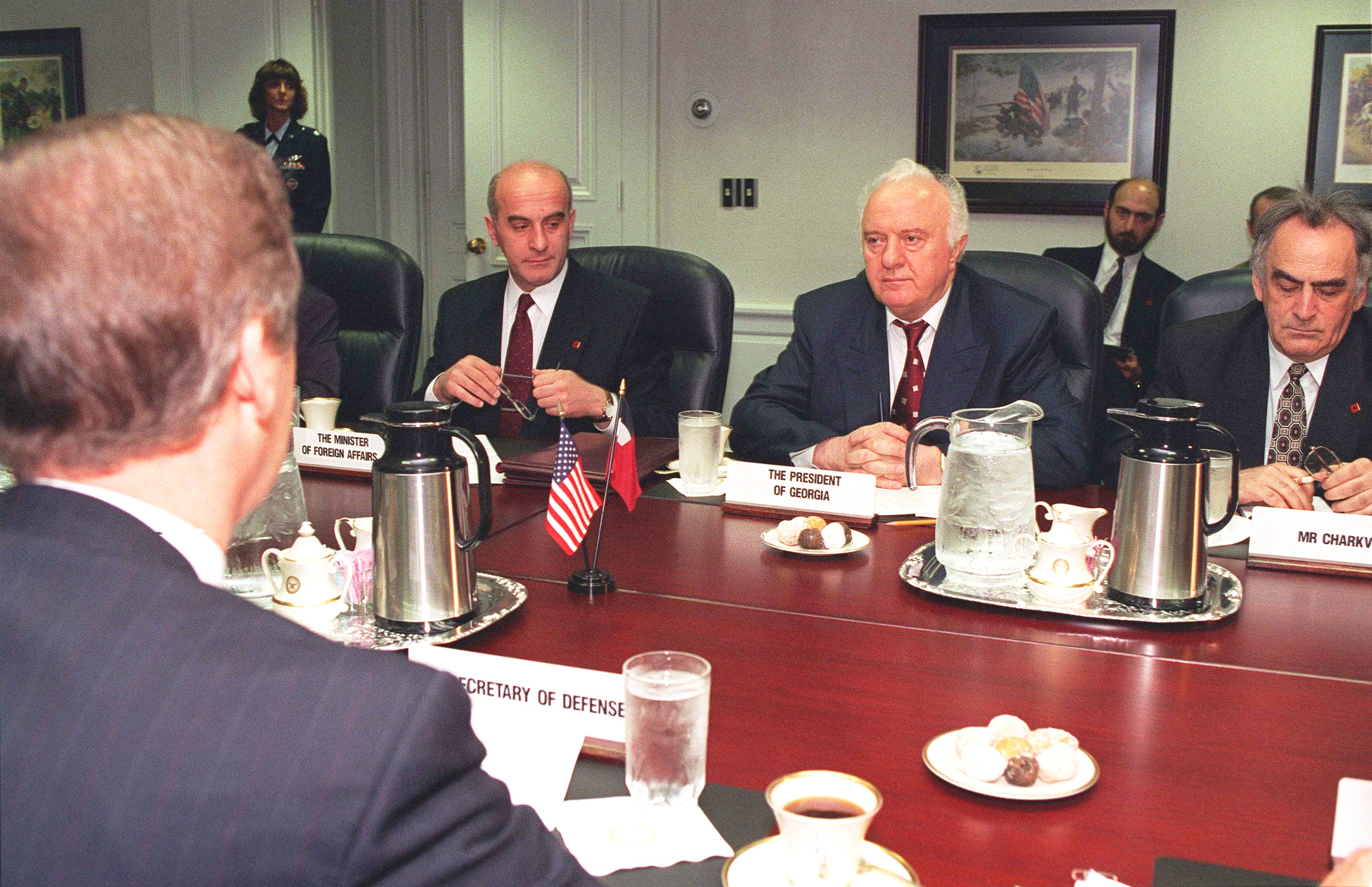

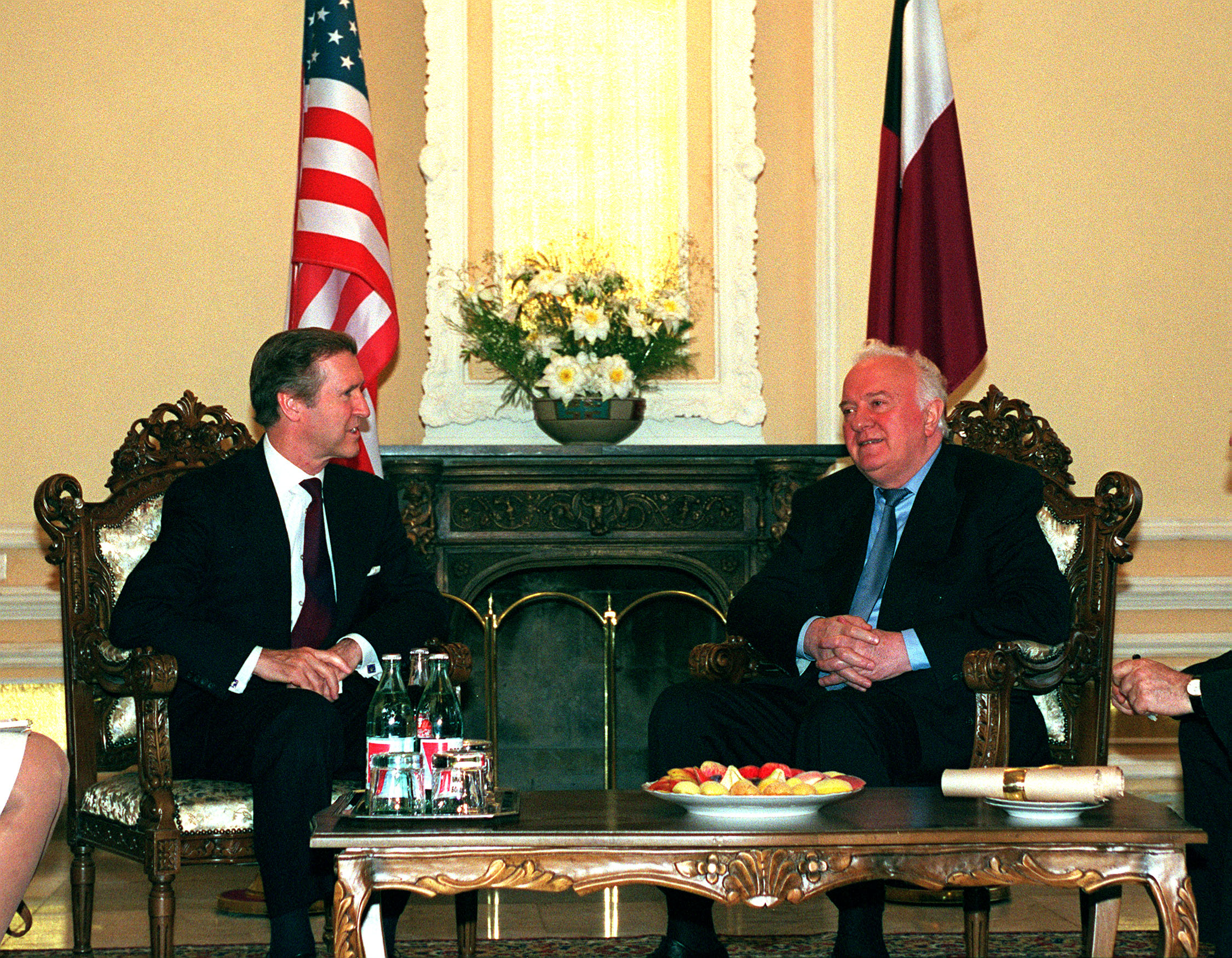

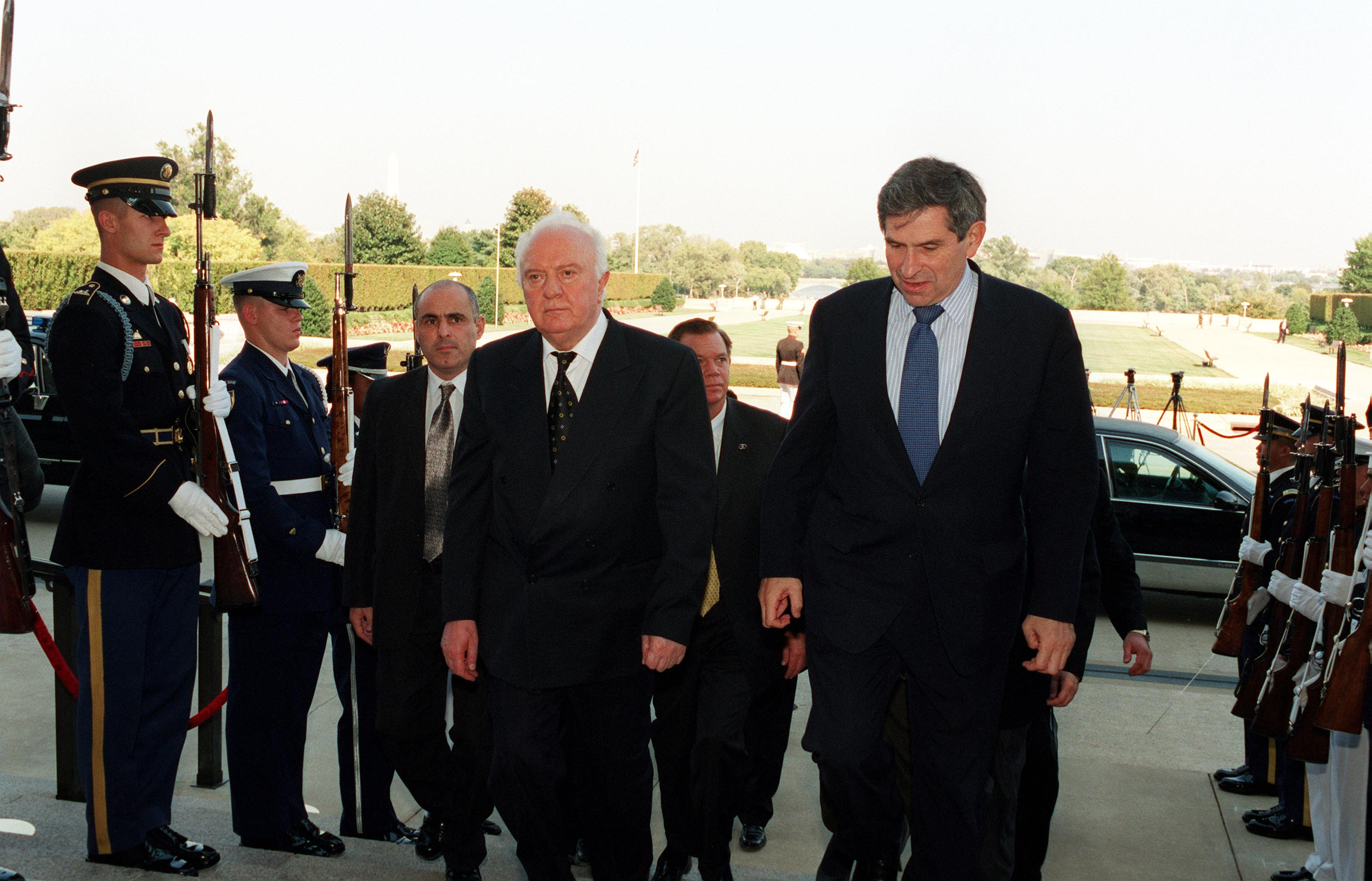

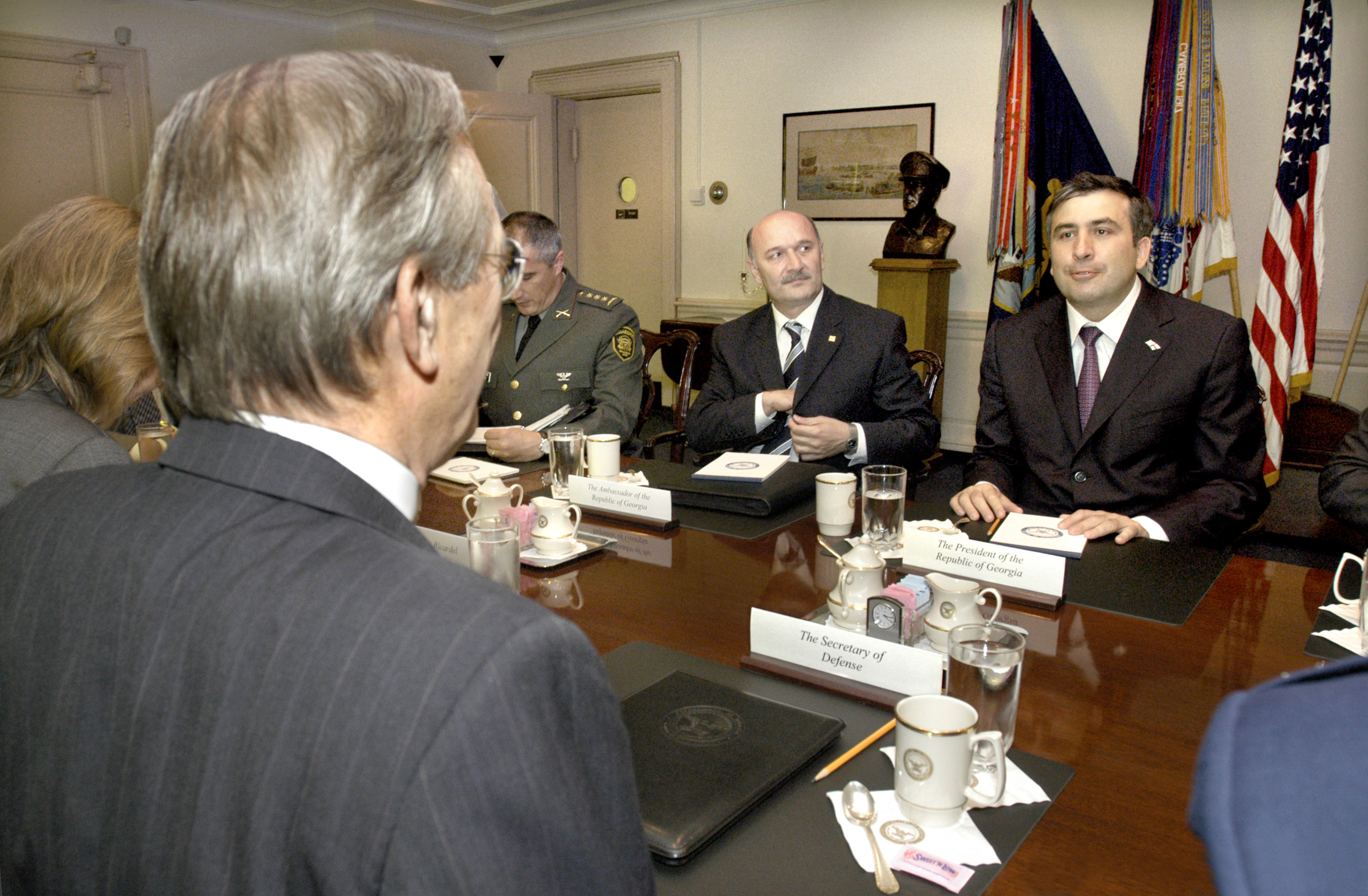

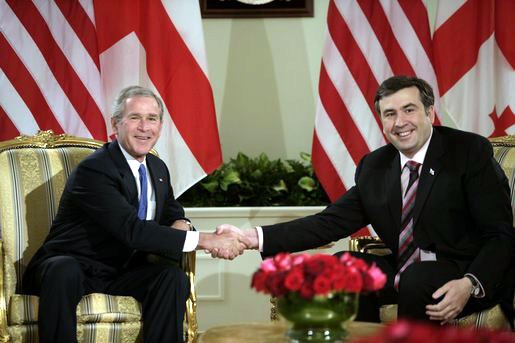

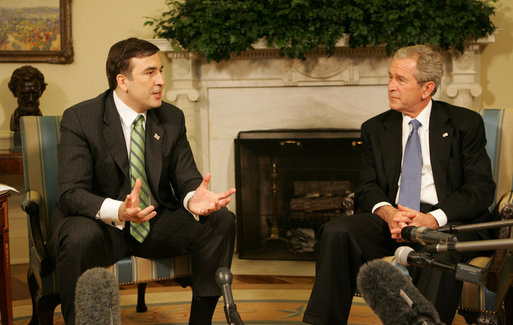

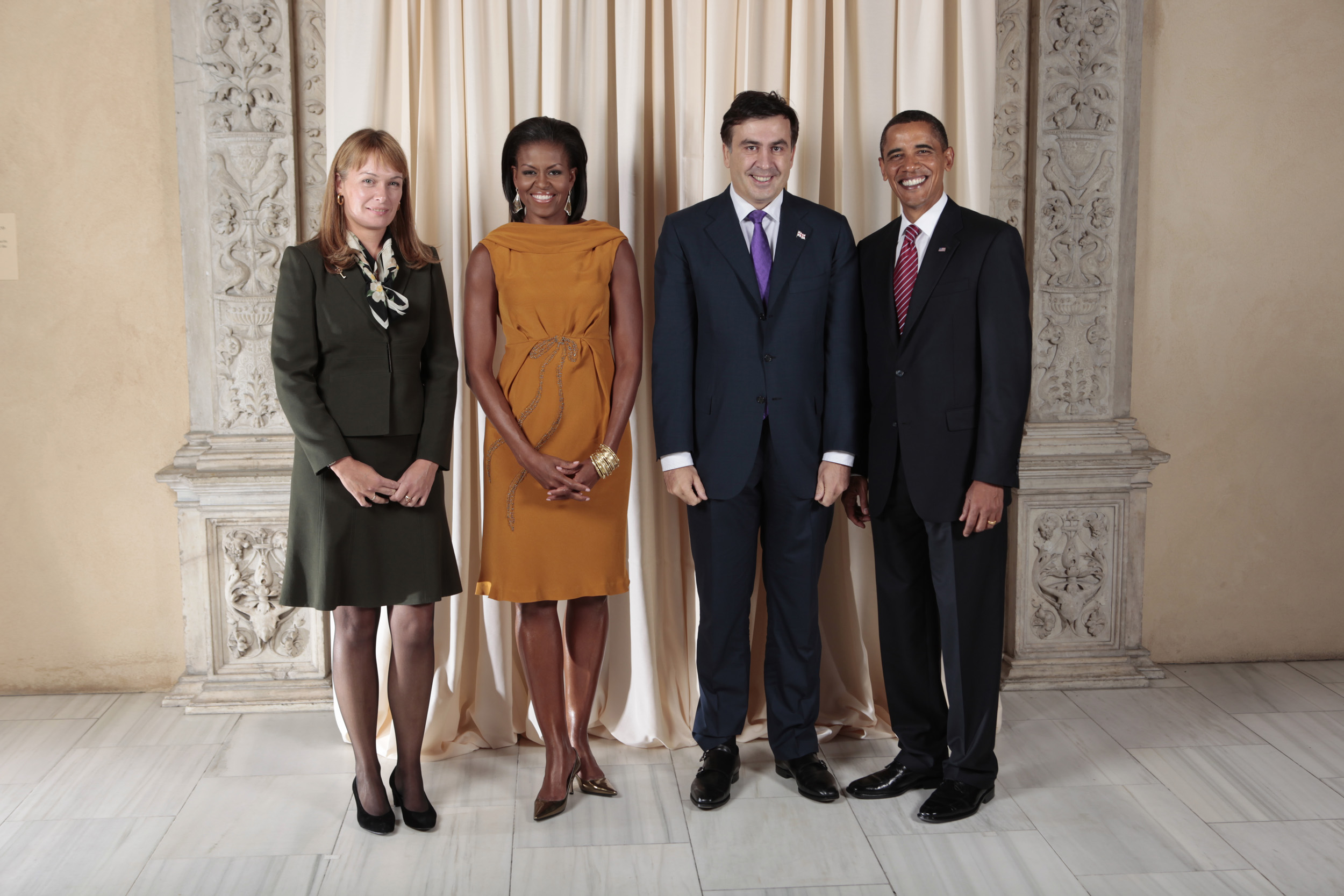

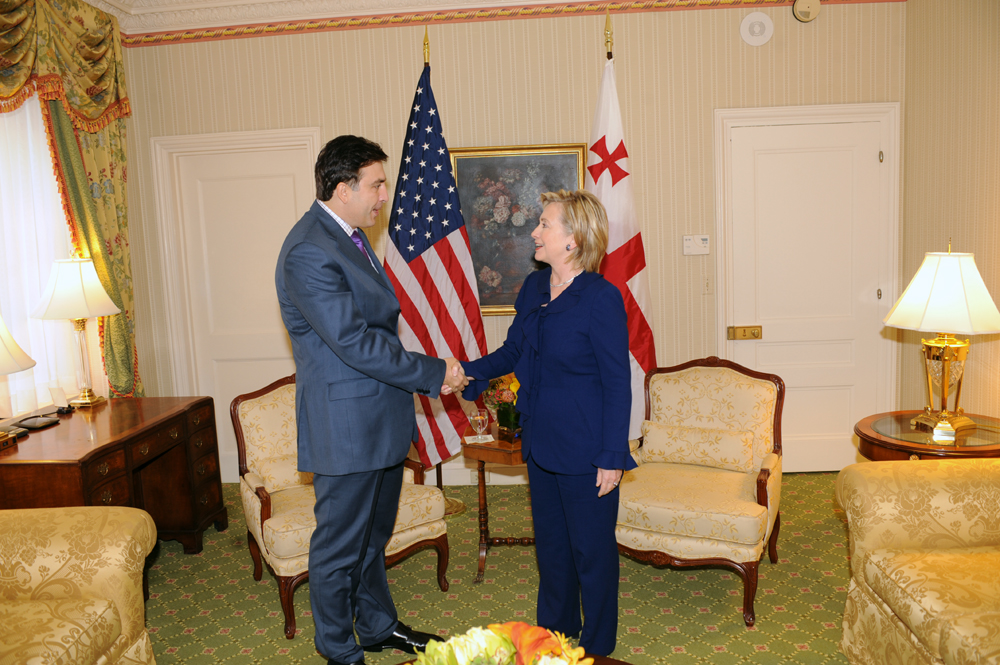

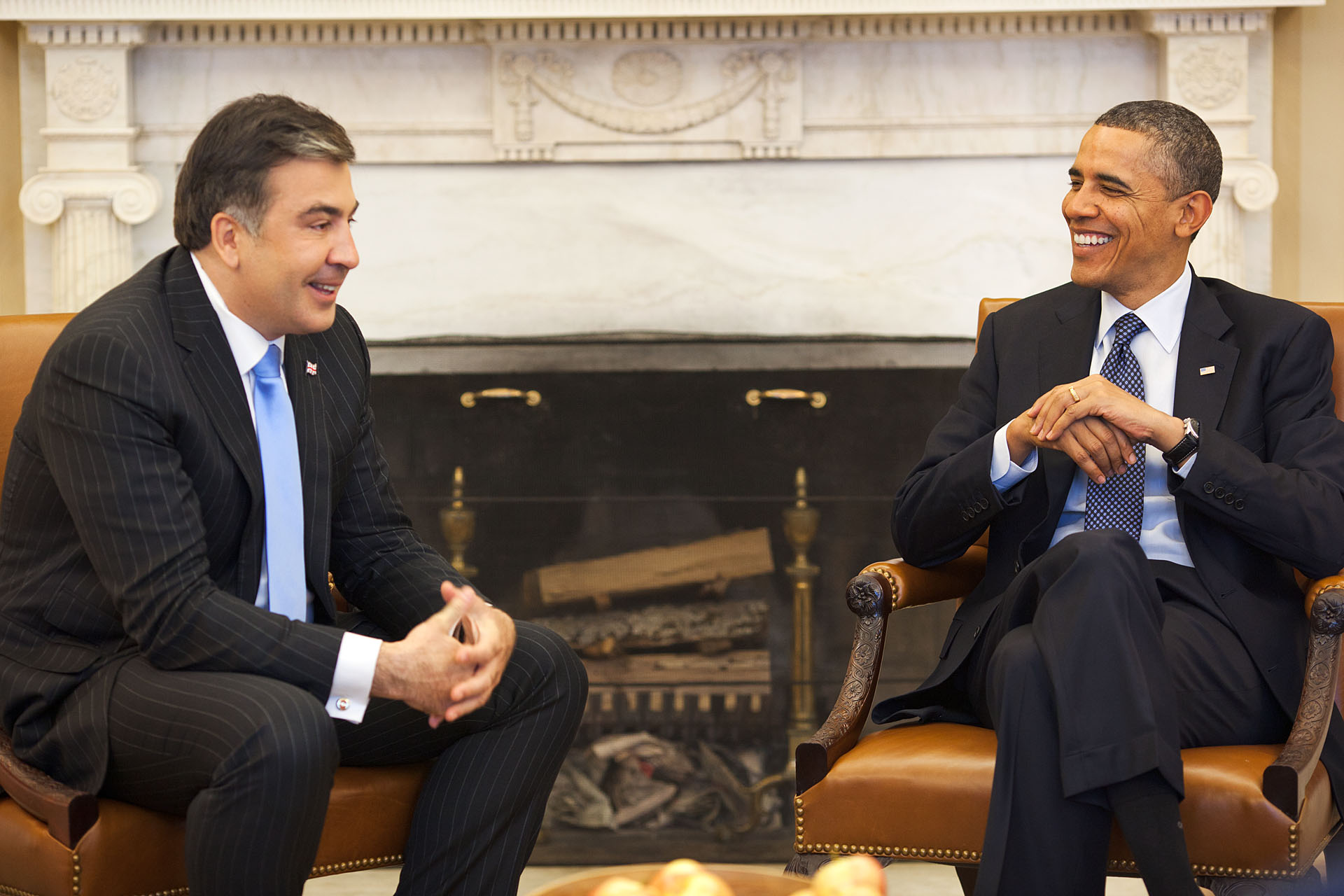

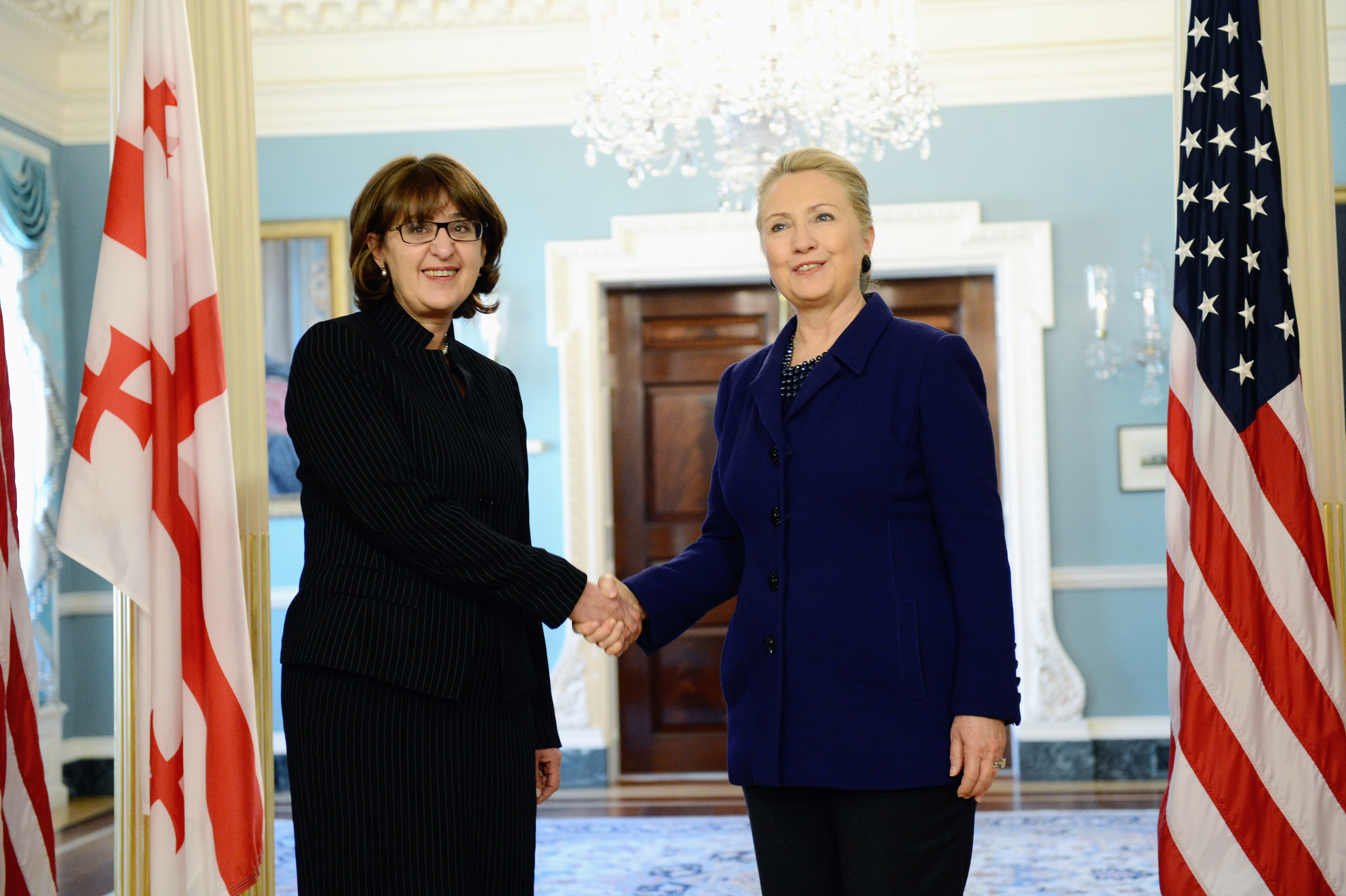

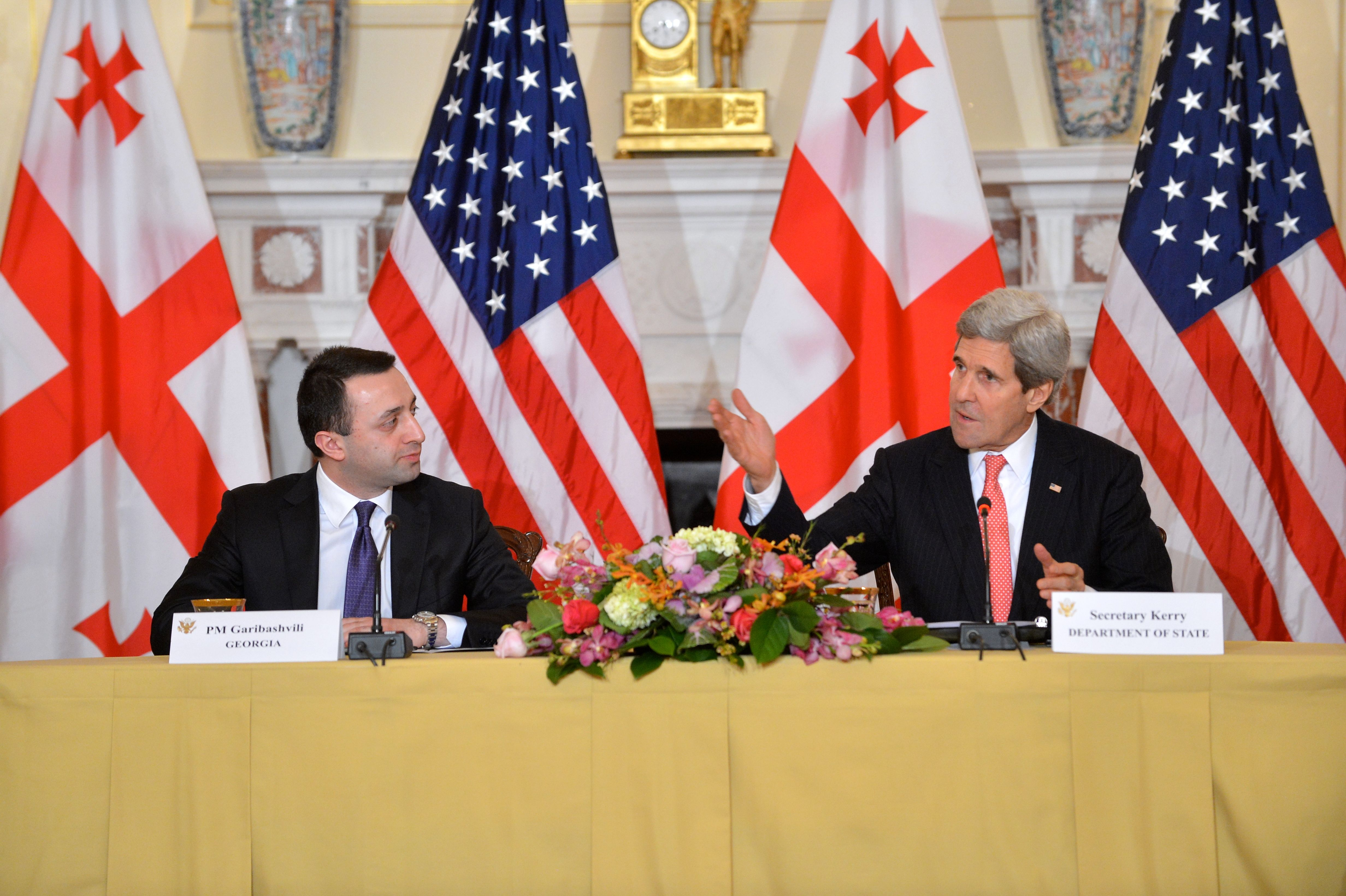

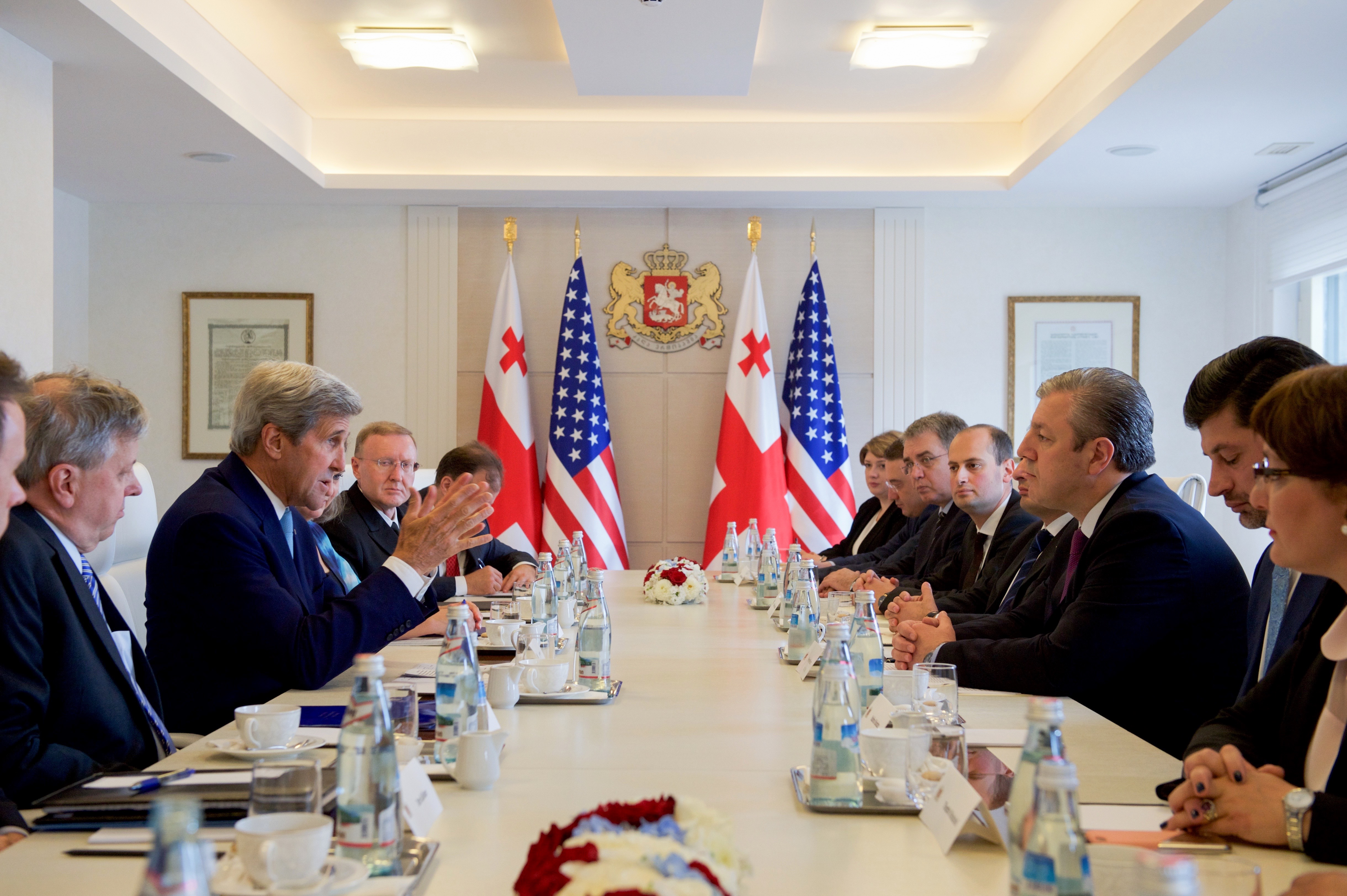

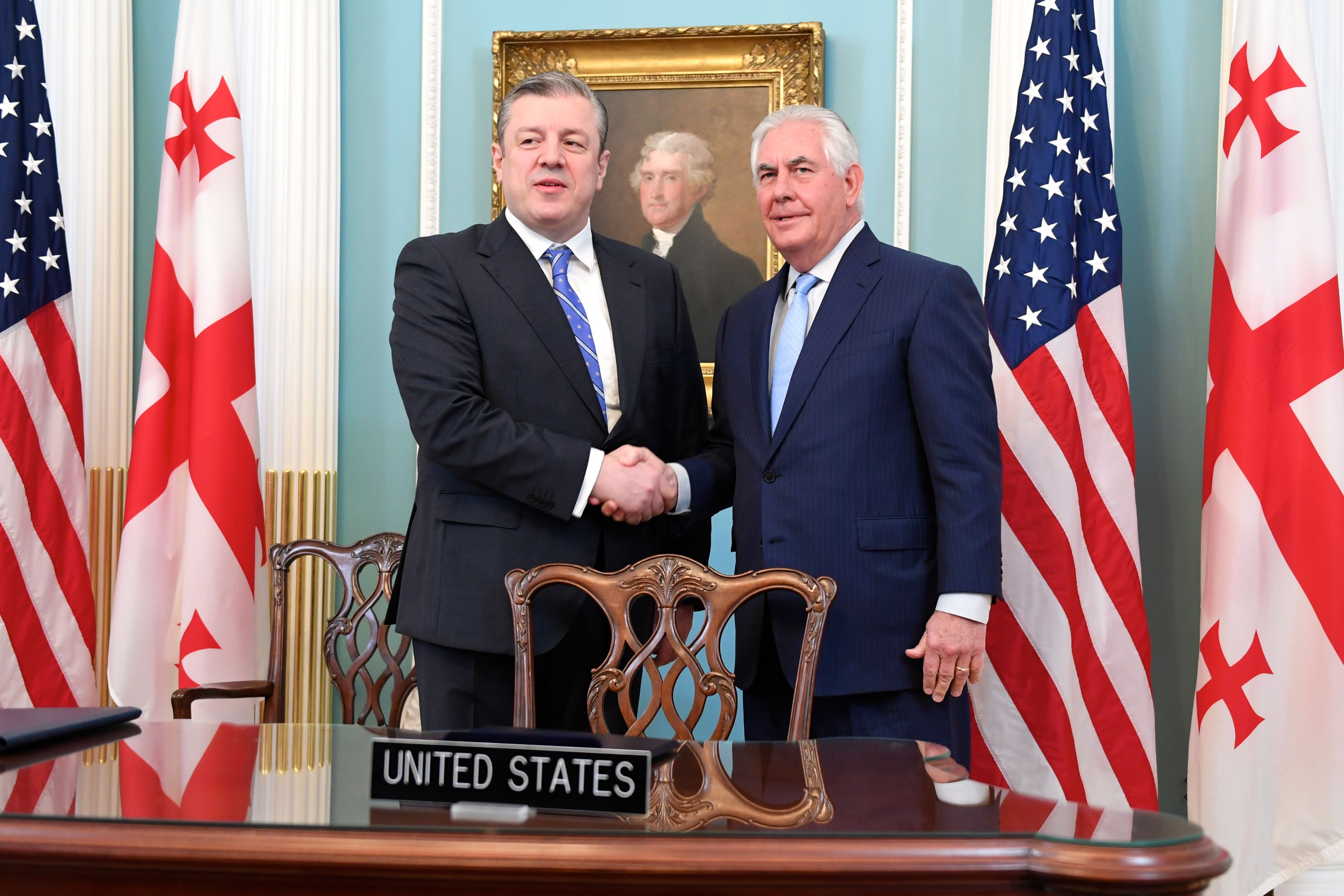

== Germany (Federal Republic of) ==
Table of Trips
| Start | End | Guest | Title | Reason |
|---|---|---|---|---|
| April 7, 1953 | April 10, 1953 | Konrad Adenauer | Chancellor | Guest of the President. In U.S. April 6–18. Visited San Francisco, Carmel, Chicago, New York City, and Boston |
| October 27, 1954 | October 30, 1954 | Konrad Adenauer | Chancellor | Signed Treaty of Friendship, Commerce and Navigation. Afterwards visited New York City. Departed U.S. November 1. |
| June 11, 1956 | June 13, 1956 | Konrad Adenauer | Chancellor | In U.S. June 9–15, visiting New York City, New Haven, Chicago and Milwaukee Departed U.S. June 15. |
| May 27, 1957 | May 29, 1957 | Konrad Adenauer | Chancellor | Official visit. Private visit to New York City and Greenwich May 24–25. |
| June 4, 1958 | June 7, 1958 | Theodor Heuss | President | State visit. Addressed U.S. Congress June 5. Afterwards visited Philadelphia, Hanover, Detroit, Chicago, San Francisco, the Grand Canyon, Williamsburg and Charlottesville, and New York City. Departed U.S. June 23. |
| March 15, 1960 | March 17, 1960 | Konrad Adenauer | Chancellor | Informal meeting with President Eisenhower en route to Japan. In U.S. March 12–23, visiting New York City, Los Angeles, Palm Desert, San Francisco, and Honolulu, Hawaii |
| April 11, 1961 | April 16, 1961 | Konrad Adenauer | Chancellor | Informal visit. Afterwards visited Austin and the LBJ Ranch. Departed U.S. April 17. |
| November 19, 1961 | November 23, 1961 | Konrad Adenauer | Chancellor | Informal visit; discussed Berlin Crisis with President Kennedy. |
| November 13, 1962 | November 16, 1962 | Konrad Adenauer | Chancellor | Informal visit. |
| November 24, 1963 | November 25, 1963 | Heinrich Lübke | President | Attended funeral of President Kennedy. |
| November 24, 1963 | November 25, 1963 | Ludwig Erhard | Chancellor | Attended funeral of President Kennedy. |
| December 28, 1963 | December 29, 1963 | Ludwig Erhard | Chancellor | Informal visit at LBJ Ranch. |
| June 12, 1964 | June 13, 1964 | Ludwig Erhard | Chancellor | Informal visit. Arrived in U.S. June 11; visited Cambridge and New York City. |
| June 4, 1965 | June 4, 1965 | Ludwig Erhard | Chancellor | Informal visit. Arrived in U.S. May 31; visited New York City. |
| December 19, 1965 | December 21, 1965 | Ludwig Erhard | Chancellor | Informal visit. |
| October 26, 1966 | October 27, 1966 | Ludwig Erhard | Chancellor | Informal visit. In U.S. September 24–27; visited Cape Kennedy. |
| August 13, 1967 | August 19, 1967 | Kurt Georg Kiesinger | Chancellor | Official visit. |
| March 31, 1969 | April 1, 1969 | Kurt Georg Kiesinger | Chancellor | Attended funeral of former President Eisenhower; met with President Nixon April 1. |
| August 7, 1969 | August 9, 1969 | Kurt Georg Kiesinger | Chancellor | Official visit. In U.S. August 5–9; visited New York City. |
| April 7, 1970 | April 11, 1970 | Willy Brandt | Chancellor | Official visit. U.S. April 4; visited El Paso and Cape Kennedy. |
| June 15, 1971 | June 16, 1971 | Willy Brandt | Chancellor | Private visit. Arrived in U.S. June 14; also visited Hartford |
| December 28, 1971 | December 29, 1971 | Willy Brandt | Chancellor | Informal visit at Key Biscayne |
| May 1, 1973 | May 2, 1973 | Willy Brandt | Chancellor | Official visit. |
| October 29, 1973 | October 29, 1973 | Willy Brandt | Chancellor | Private visit; met with President Nixon at the White House. |
| December 4, 1974 | December 6, 1974 | Helmut Schmidt | Chancellor | Official visit. Afterwards visited New York City. Departed U.S. December 7. |
| June 16, 1975 | June 18, 1975 | Walter Scheel | President | State visit. In U.S. June 15–20; visited Williamsburg, Chicago, and New York City. |
| October 3, 1975 | October 3, 1975 | Helmut Schmidt | Chancellor | Working meeting and luncheon at White House with President Ford during a private visit. |
| June 26, 1976 | June 28, 1976 | Helmut Schmidt | Chancellor | Attended G-7Economic Summit meeting in Dorado, Puerto Rico |
| July 15, 1976 | July 17, 1976 | Helmut Schmidt | Chancellor | Official visit. In U.S. July 14–20; visited Williamsburg, Baltimore, and Philadelphia; private visit to San Francisco. |
| July 13, 1977 | July 15, 1977 | Helmut Schmidt | Chancellor | Official visit. |
| May 30, 1978 | May 31, 1978 | Helmut Schmidt | Chancellor | Attended the NATO Summit meeting |
| June 6, 1979 | June 6, 1979 | Helmut Schmidt | Chancellor | Private visit. In U.S. June 6–8. Met with President Carter June 6; visited Cambridge, Columbia, and New York City. |
| March 4, 1980 | March 6, 1980 | Helmut Schmidt | Chancellor | Official visit. |
| November 18, 1980 | November 21, 1980 | Helmut Schmidt | Chancellor | Private visit. Met with President Carter and President-elect Reagan November 20. |
| May 20, 1981 | May 23, 1981 | Helmut Schmidt | Chancellor | Official visit. |
| January 4, 1982 | January 6, 1982 | Helmut Schmidt | Chancellor | Private visit. Met with President Reagan January 5. |
| July 20, 1982 | July 27, 1982 | Helmut Schmidt | Chancellor | Private visit. Met with Secretary of State George Shultz at Bohemian Grove |
| November 14, 1982 | November 16, 1982 | Helmut Kohl | Chancellor | Official visit. |
| April 14, 1983 | April 15, 1983 | Helmut Kohl | Chancellor | Official working visit. |
| May 28, 1983 | May 31, 1983 | Helmut Kohl | Chancellor | Attended G-7 Economic Summit meeting, Williamsburg |
| October 3, 1983 | October 6, 1983 | Karl Carstens | President | State visit. Addressed Joint session of Congress October 5. Visited Philadelphia, St. Louis, El Paso, Dallas, the Grand Canyon, Las Vegas, Seattle, New York City, and New Haven. Departed U.S. October 14. |
| March 3, 1984 | March 6, 1984 | Helmut Kohl | Chancellor | Official working visit. |
| November 29, 1984 | November 30, 1984 | Helmut Kohl | Chancellor | Official working visit. |
| October 25, 1985 | October 25, 1985 | Helmut Kohl | Chancellor | Met with President Reagan in New York City. |
| October 20, 1986 | October 23, 1986 | Helmut Kohl | Chancellor | Official Visit; visited Chicago. |
| February 17, 1988 | February 19, 1988 | Helmut Kohl | Chancellor | Official working visit. |
| November 15, 1988 | November 15, 1988 | Helmut Kohl | Chancellor | Official working visit. |
| June 6, 1989 | June 6, 1989 | Richard von Weizsäcker | President | Met with President Bush during a private visit |
| February 24, 1990 | February 25, 1990 | Helmut Kohl | Chancellor | Informal meeting at Camp David |
| May 17, 1990 | May 17, 1990 | Helmut Kohl | Chancellor | Private visit. |
| June 8, 1990 | June 8, 1990 | Helmut Kohl | Chancellor | Private visit. Had also visited New York City and Boston. |
| July 8, 1990 | July 11, 1990 | Helmut Kohl | Chancellor | Attended Economic Summit meeting in Houston |
| May 19, 1991 | May 21, 1991 | Helmut Kohl | Chancellor | official Visit. |
| September 16, 1991 | September 16, 1991 | Helmut Kohl | Chancellor | Official working visit. |
| March 20, 1992 | March 22, 1992 | Helmut Kohl | Chancellor | Informal meeting with President Bush at Camp David |
| April 28, 1992 | May 1, 1992 | Richard von Weizsäcker | President | State Visit.Addressed Joint Meeting of Congress April 29. Afterwards visited Atlanta |
| March 25, 1993 | March 26, 1993 | Helmut Kohl | Chancellor | Met with President Clinton during a private visit. |
| May 23, 1993 | May 25, 1993 | Richard von Weizsäcker | President | Visited Holocaust Memorial Museum and met with President Clinton on May 24. |
| January 30, 1994 | January 31, 1994 | Helmut Kohl | Chancellor | Working visit. |
| February 9, 1995 | February 10, 1995 | Helmut Kohl | Chancellor | Official visit. |
| May 22, 1996 | May 23, 1996 | Helmut Kohl | Chancellor | Official working visit in Milwaukee and Washington, D.C. |
| June 20, 1997 | June 22, 1997 | Helmut Kohl | Chancellor | Attended the Economic Summit meeting in Denver |
| July 22, 1997 | July 24, 1997 | Roman Herzog | President | Working visit. |
| October 8, 1998 | October 9, 1998 | Gerhard Schröder | Chancellor | Met with President Clinton during a private visit. |
| February 11, 1999 | February 12, 1999 | Gerhard Schröder | Chancellor | Working visit. |
| April 23, 1999 | April 25, 1999 | Gerhard Schröder | Chancellor | Attended NATO's 50th Anniversary Summit. |
| March 28, 2001 | March 29, 2001 | Gerhard Schröder | Chancellor | Working visit. |
| October 9, 2001 | October 9, 2001 | Gerhard Schröder | Chancellor | Working visit. |
| January 30, 2002 | January 31, 2002 | Gerhard Schröder | Chancellor | Working visit. Also attended World Economic Forum in New York City. |
| September 24, 2003 | September 24, 2003 | Gerhard Schröder | Chancellor | Met with President Bush at the UN General Assembly in New York City. |
| February 26, 2004 | February 27, 2004 | Gerhard Schröder | Chancellor | Working visit. |
| June 8, 2004 | June 11, 2004 | Gerhard Schröder | Chancellor | Attended G-8 Economic Summit at Sea Island. Attended the funeral of Former President Reagan |
| June 27, 2005 | June 27, 2005 | Gerhard Schröder | Chancellor | Working visit. |
| January 12, 2006 | January 13, 2006 | Angela Merkel | Chancellor | Working visit. |
| May 3, 2006 | May 4, 2006 | Angela Merkel | Chancellor | Working visit. |
| January 4, 2007 | January 4, 2007 | Angela Merkel | Chancellor | Working visit. |
| May 29, 2007 | May 30, 2007 | Angela Merkel | Chancellor | Attended U.S.-EU Summit meeting. |
| November 9, 2007 | November 10, 2007 | Angela Merkel | Chancellor | Working visit. Met with President Bush in Crawford Ranch |
| November 14, 2008 | November 15, 2008 | Angela Merkel | Chancellor | Attended the G-20 Economic Summit meeting. |
| June 26, 2009 | June 26, 2009 | Angela Merkel | Chancellor | Working Visit. |
| September 24, 2009 | September 25, 2009 | Angela Merkel | Chancellor | Attended the G-20 Economic Summit in Pittsburgh |
| November 3, 2009 | November 3, 2009 | Angela Merkel | Chancellor | Working Visit. Addressed Joint Meeting of Congress November 3. |
| April 12, 2010 | April 13, 2010 | Angela Merkel | Chancellor | Attended the Nuclear Security Summit |
| June 6, 2011 | June 7, 2011 | Angela Merkel | Chancellor | Official Visit. |
| May 18, 2012 | May 19, 2012 | Angela Merkel | Chancellor | Attended the G-8 Economic Summit at Camp David. |
| May 20, 2012 | May 21, 2012 | Angela Merkel | Chancellor | Attended the NATO Summit meeting in Chicago. |
| May 2, 2014 | May 2, 2014 | Angela Merkel | Chancellor | Working visit |
| February 9, 2015 | February 9, 2015 | Angela Merkel | Chancellor | Official Working Visit. |
| October 7, 2015 | October 7, 2015 | Joachim Gauck | President | Official Working Visit. |
| March 17, 2017 | March 17, 2017 | Angela Merkel | Chancellor | Official Working Visit. |
| April 27, 2018 | April 27, 2018 | Angela Merkel | Chancellor | Working Visit. |
| December 5, 2018 | December 5, 2018 | Angela Merkel | Chancellor | Attended the funeral of Former President Bush |
| July 15, 2021 | July 15, 2021 | Angela Merkel | Chancellor | Official Working Visit. |
| February 7, 2022 | February 7, 2022 | Olaf Scholz | Chancellor | Working Visit. |
| March 3, 2023 | March 3, 2023 | Olaf Scholz | Chancellor | Working Visit. |
| October 6, 2023 | October 6, 2023 | Frank-Walter Steinmeier | President | Working Visit. |
| February 9, 2024 | February 9, 2024 | Olaf Scholz | Chancellor | Working Visit. |
| July 10, 2024 | July 11, 2024 | Olaf Scholz | Chancellor | Attended NATO 75th Anniversary Summit in Washington, D.C. |
| June 5, 2025 | June 5, 2025 | Friedrich Merz | Chancellor | Working Visit. |

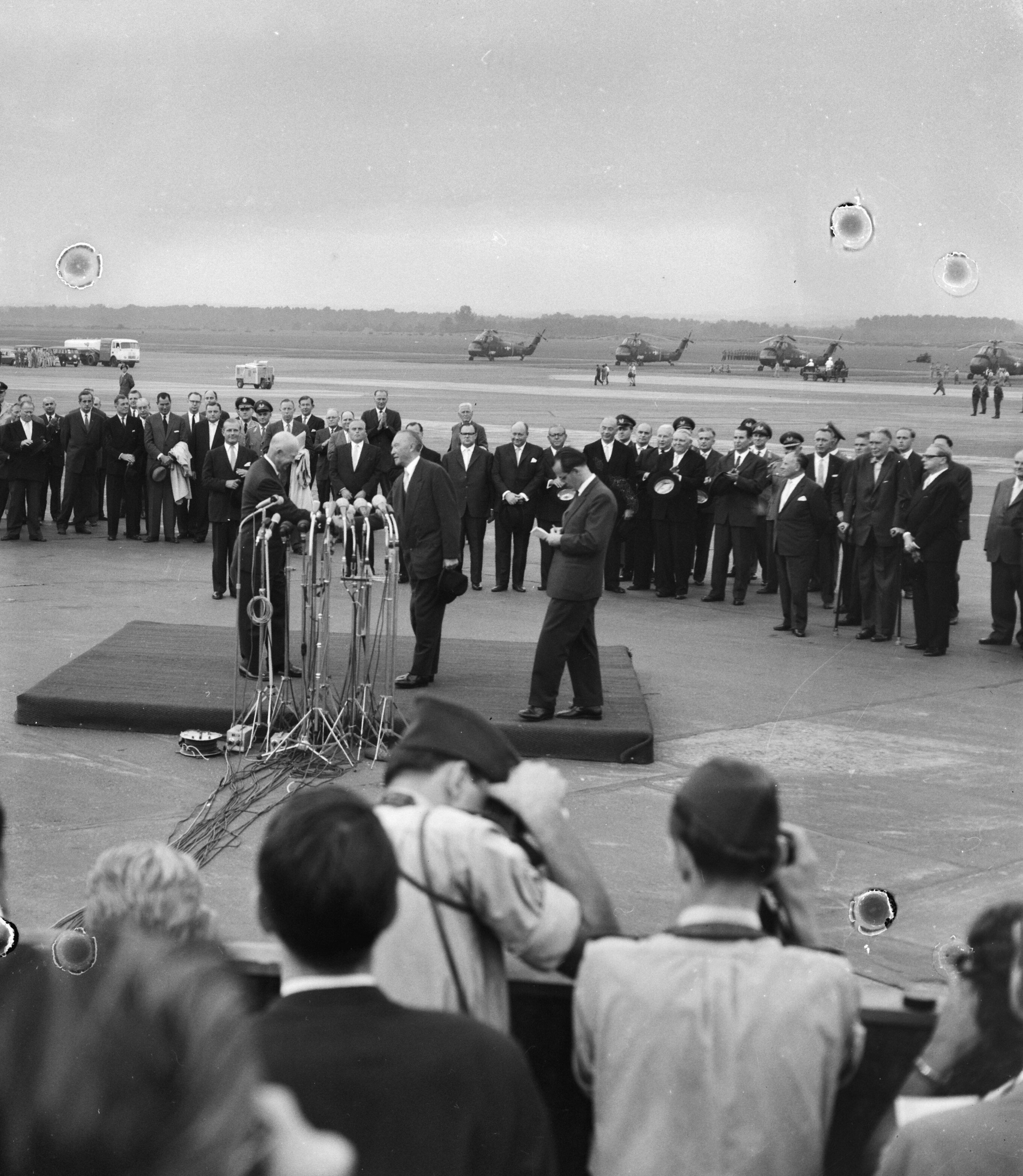

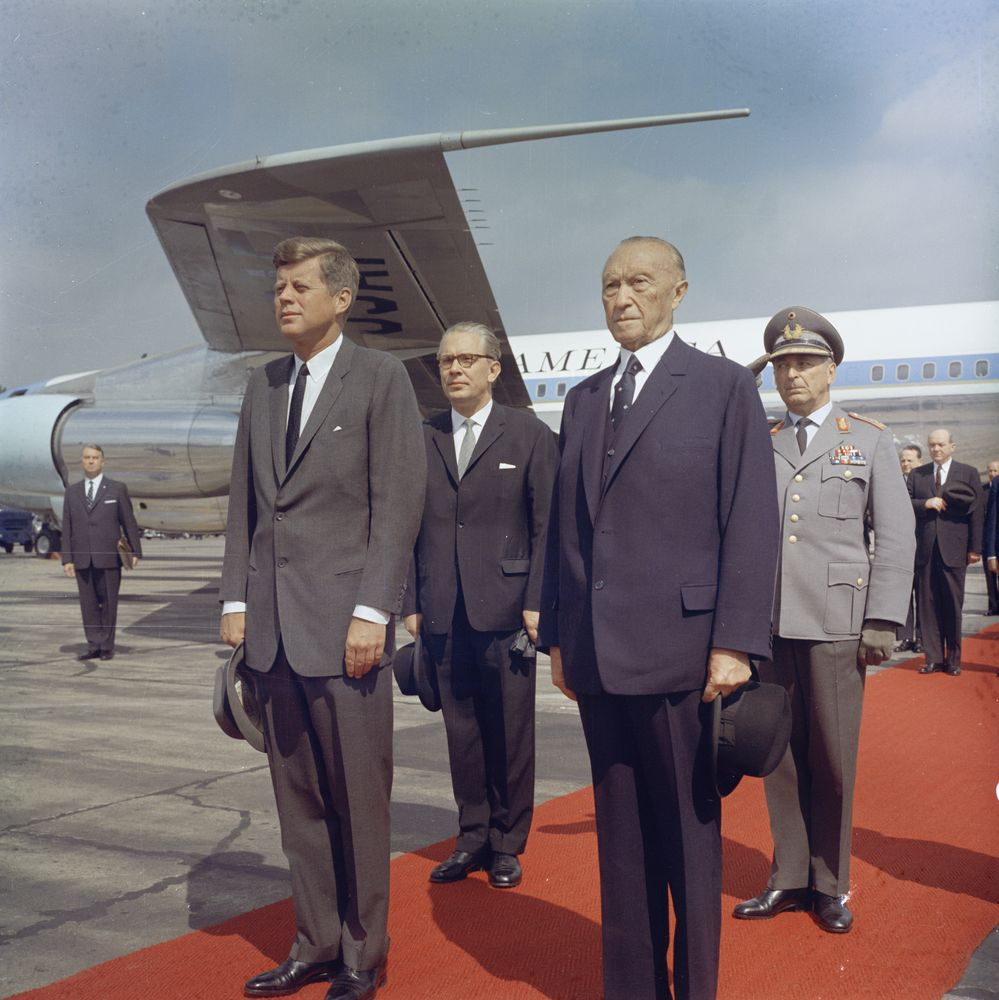

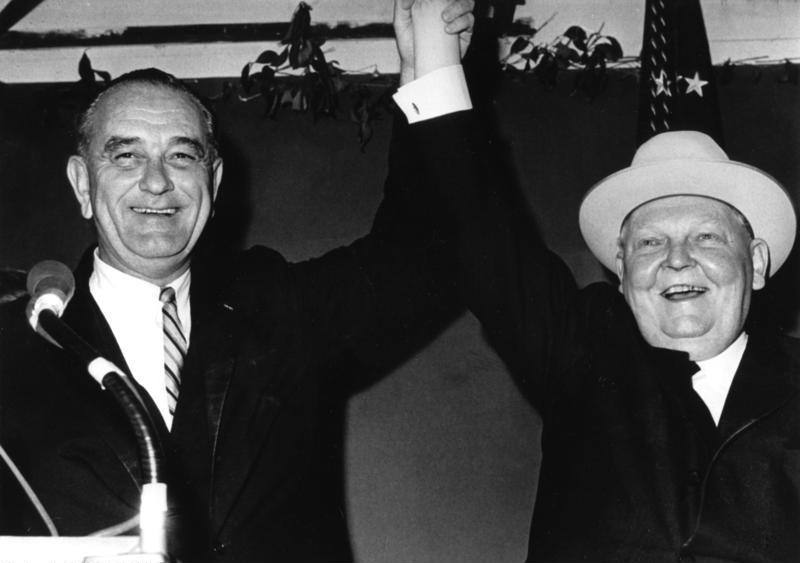

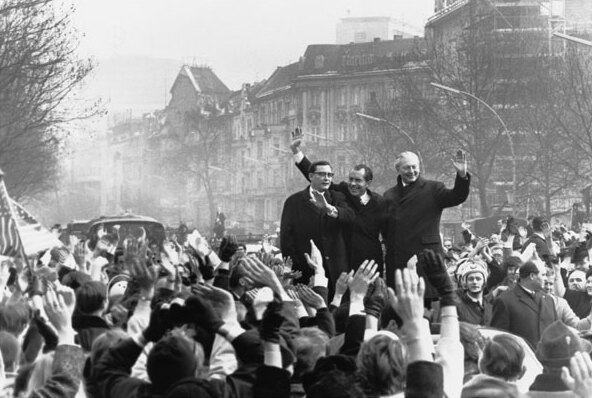

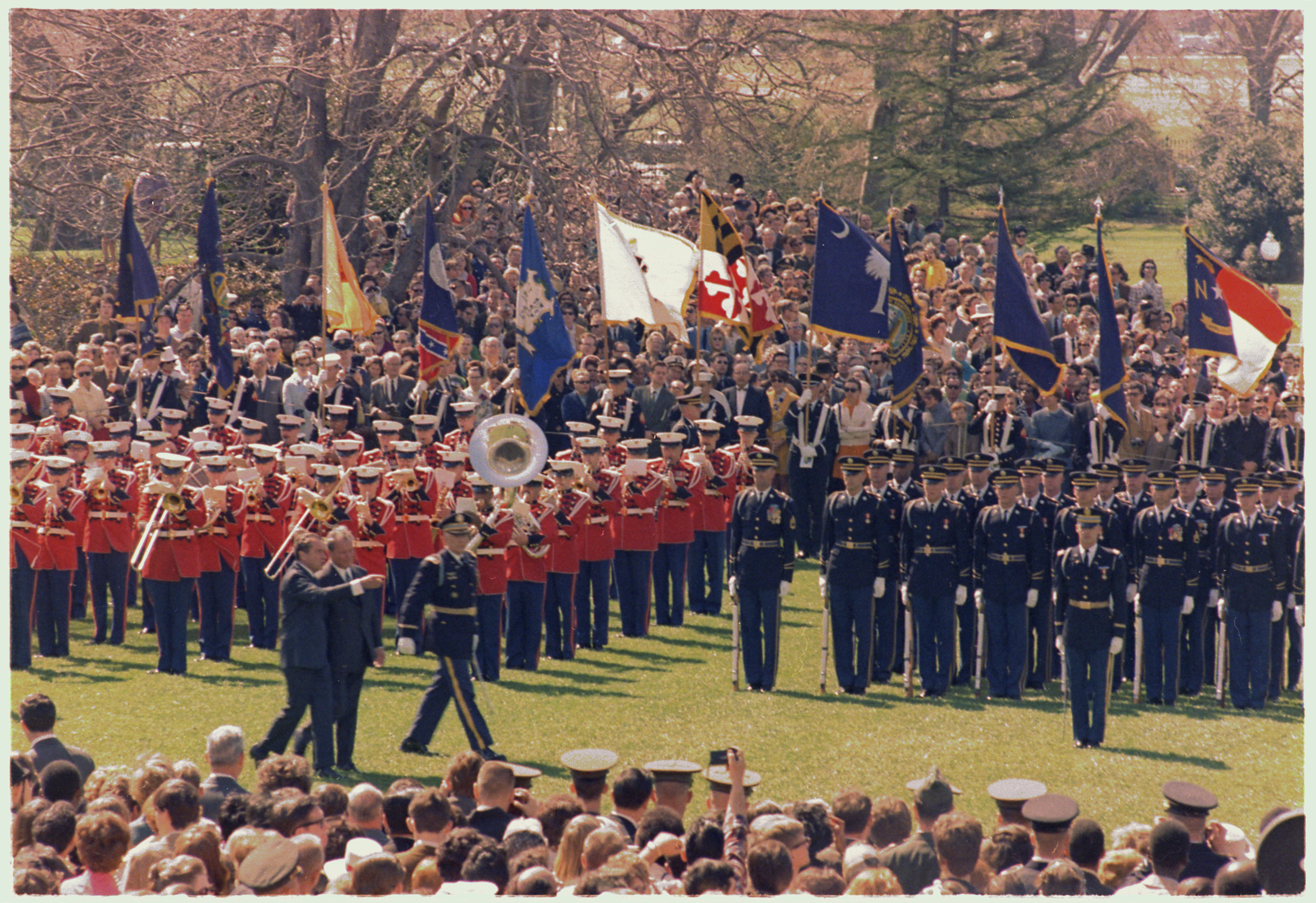

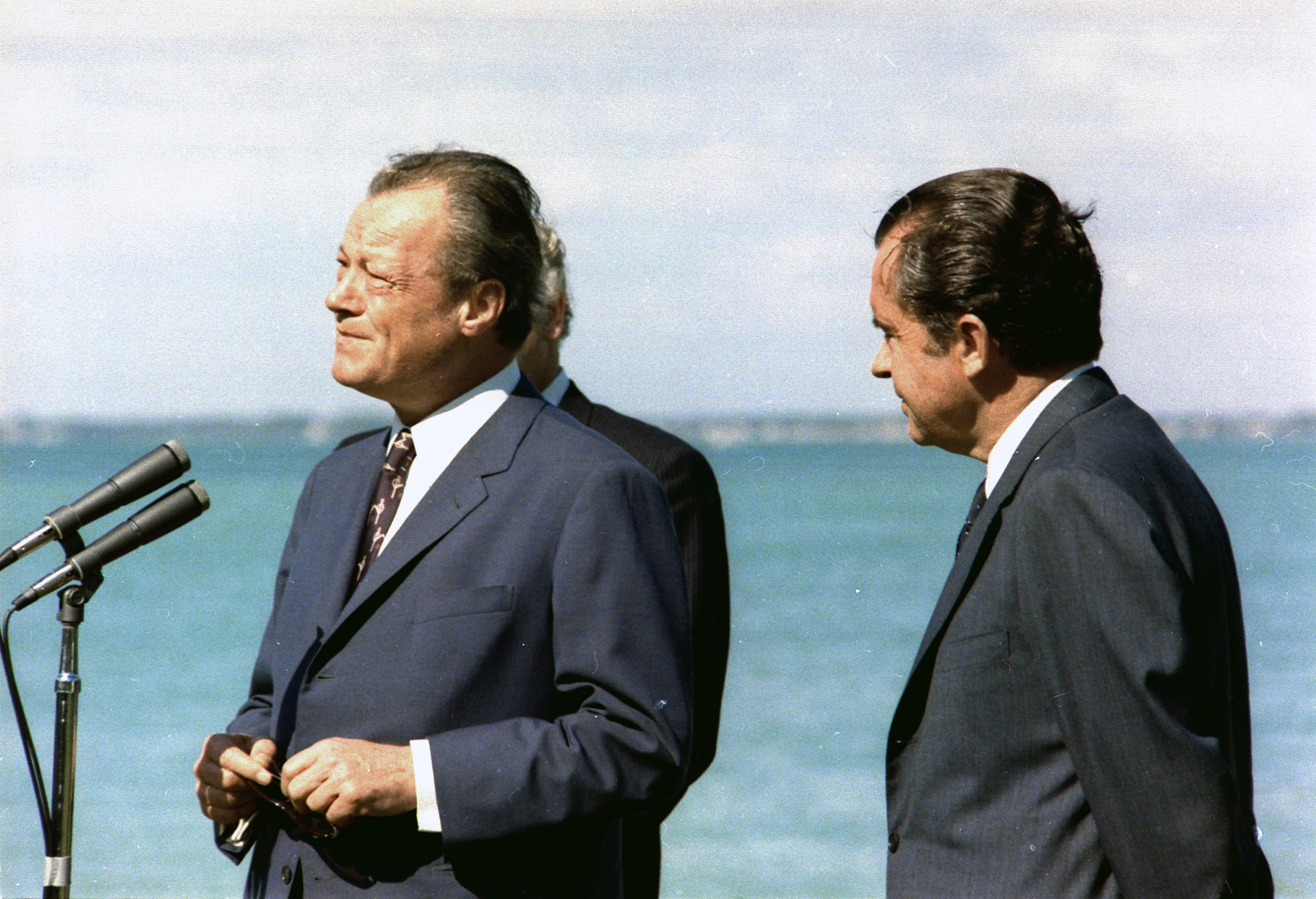

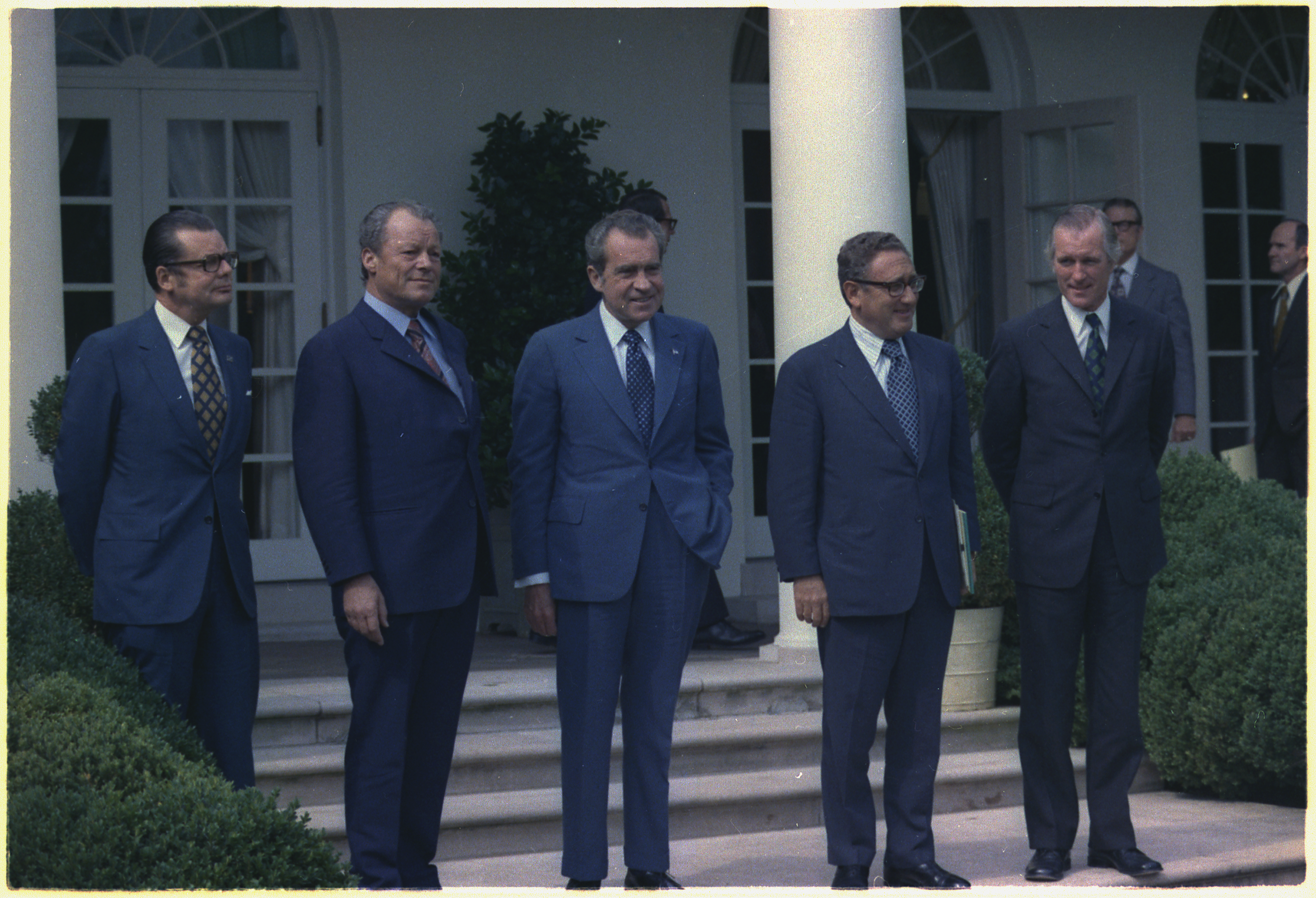

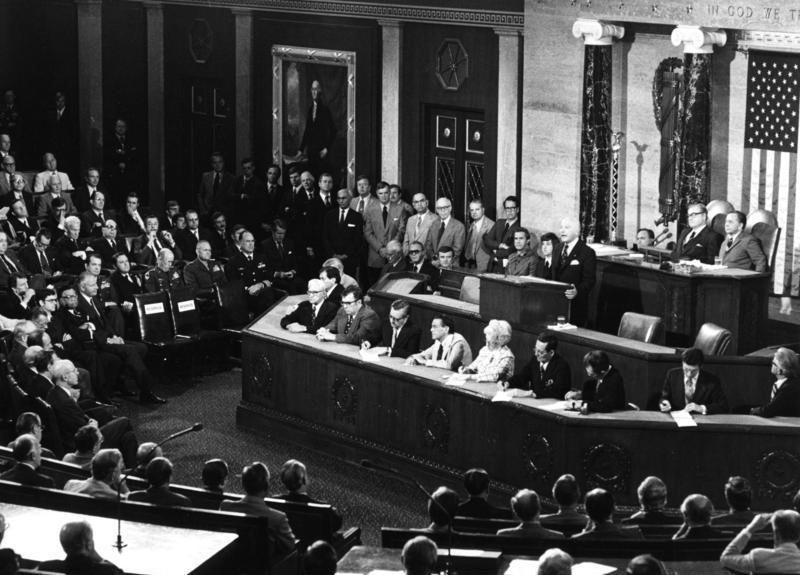

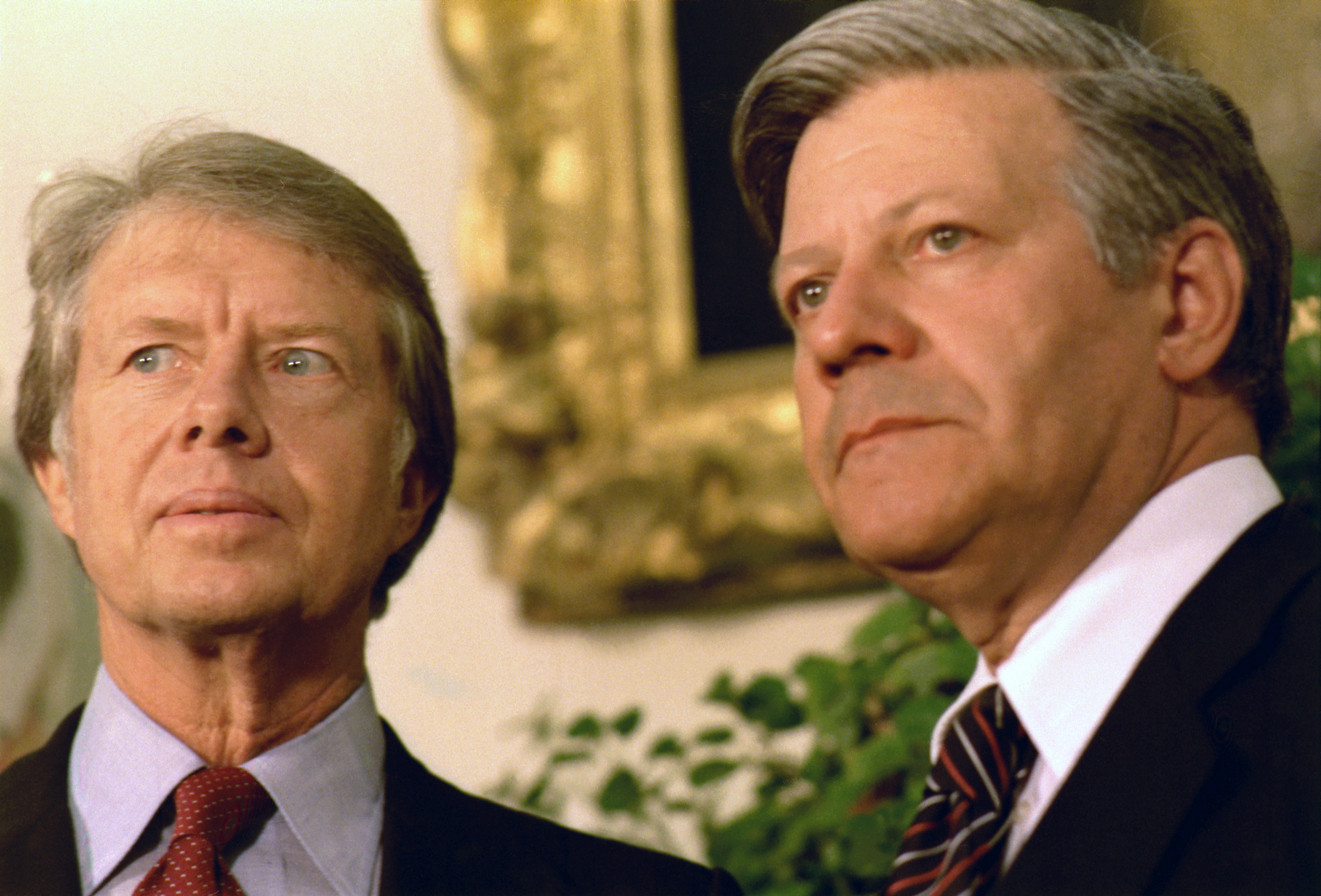

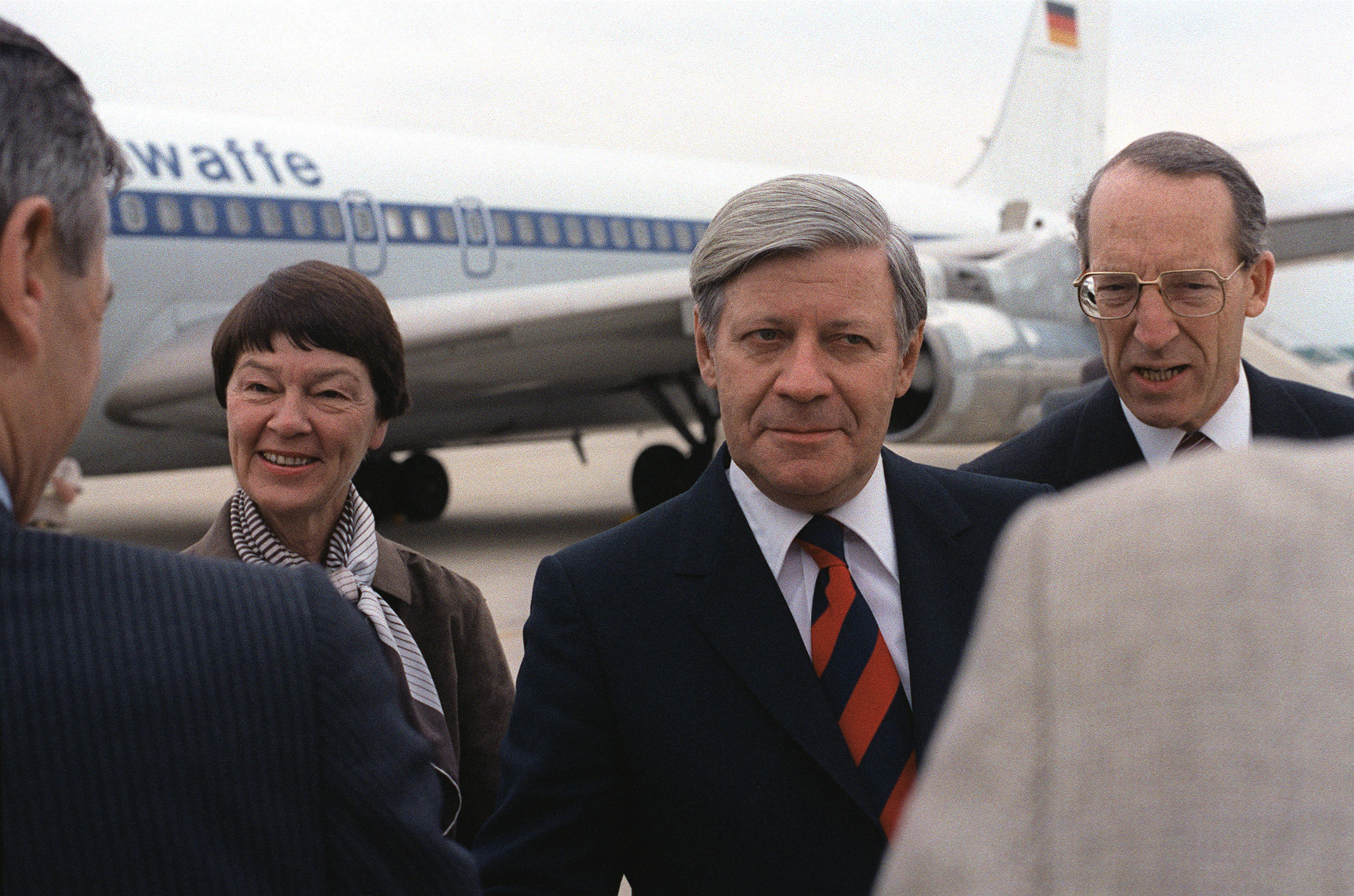

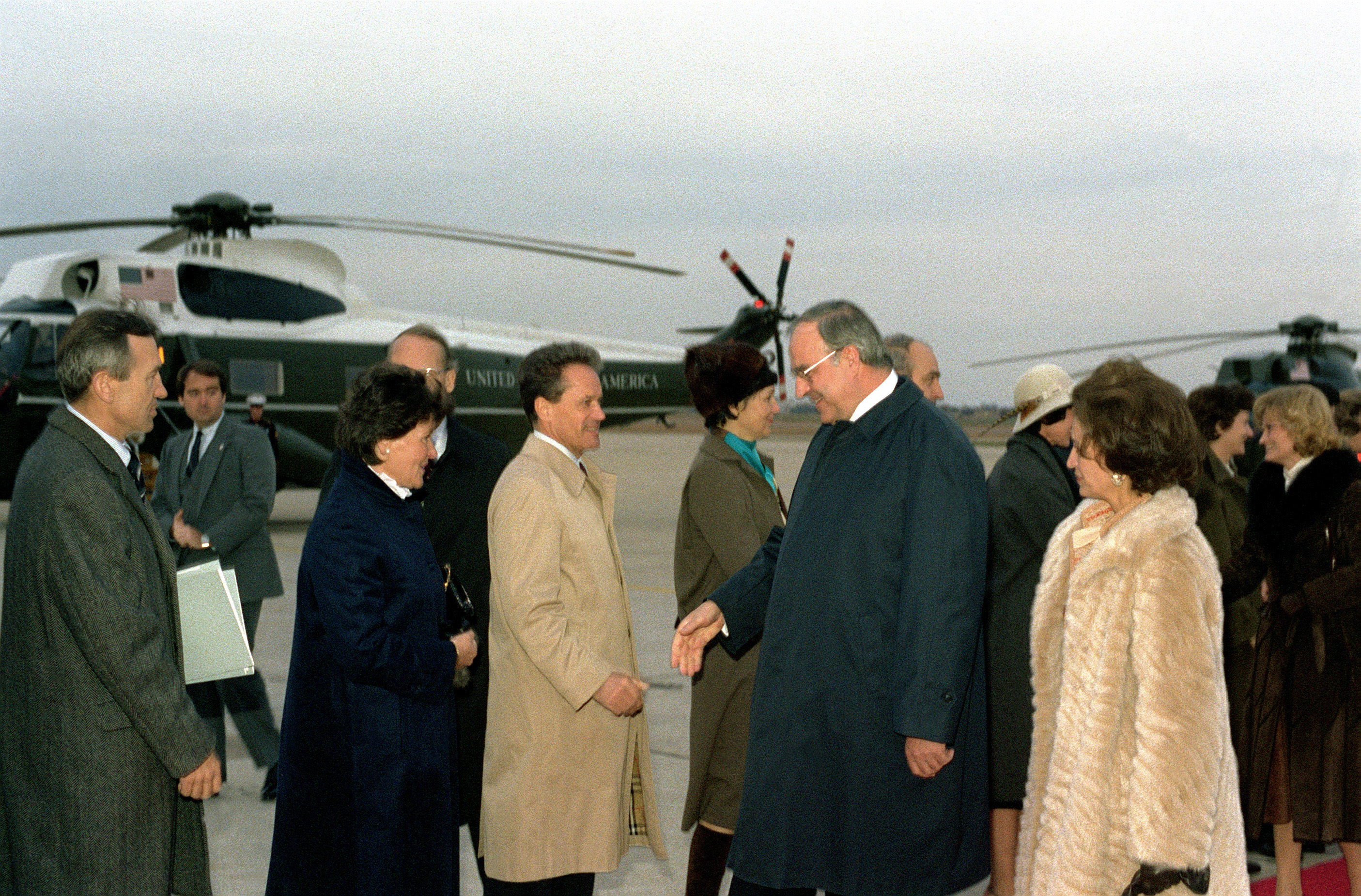

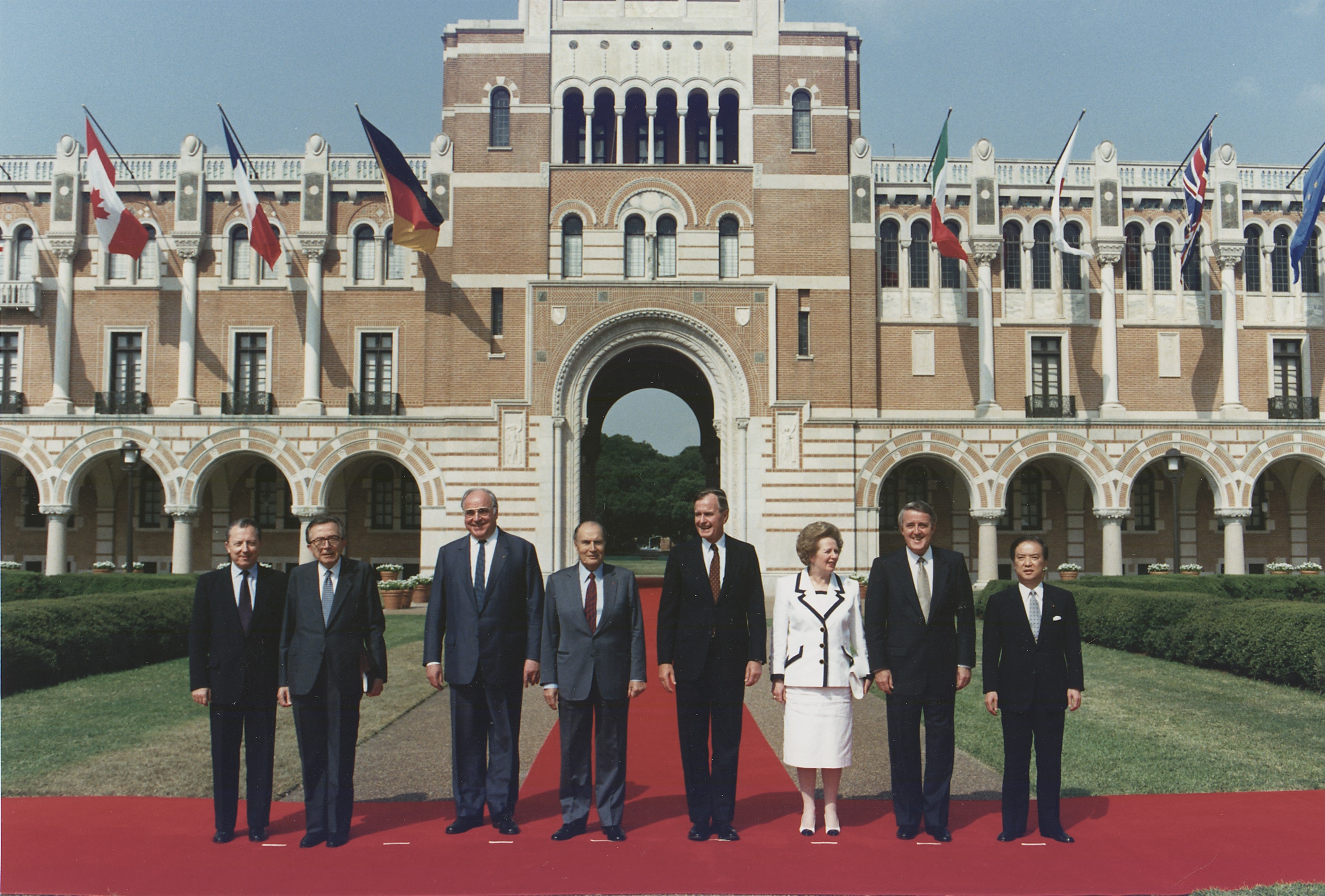

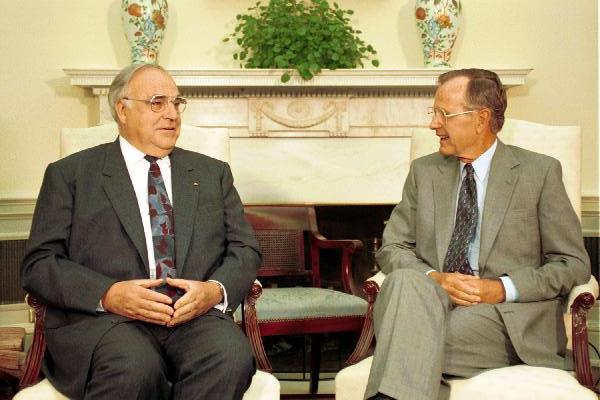

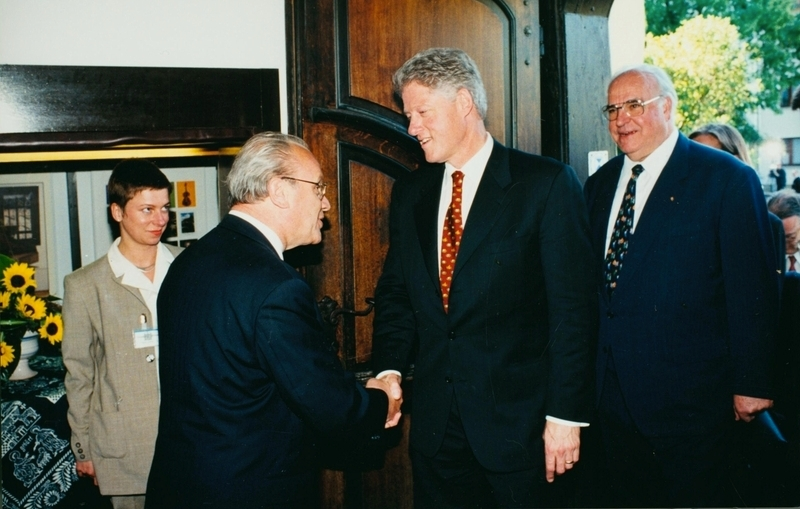

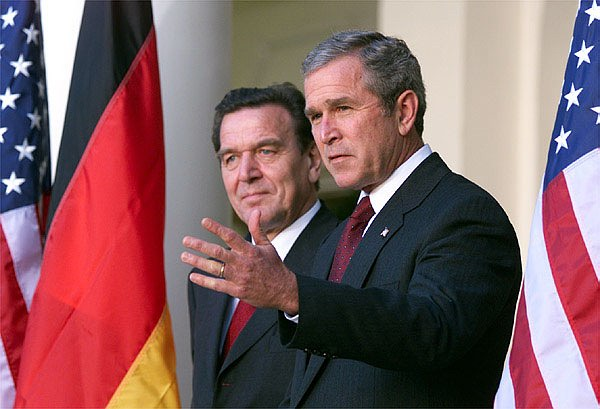

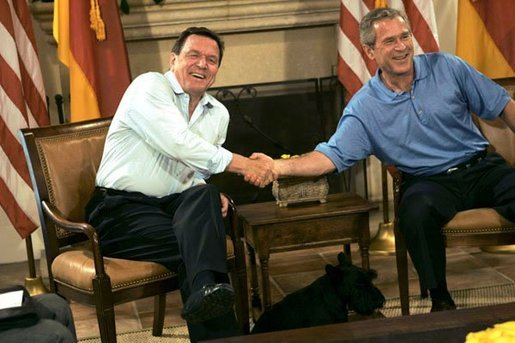

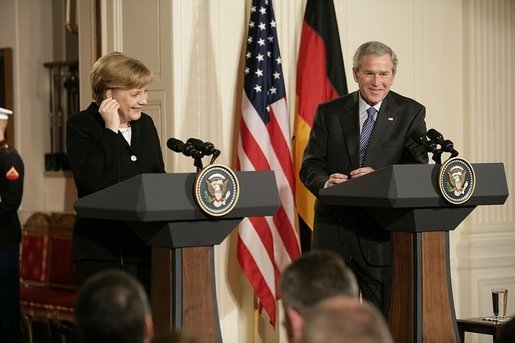

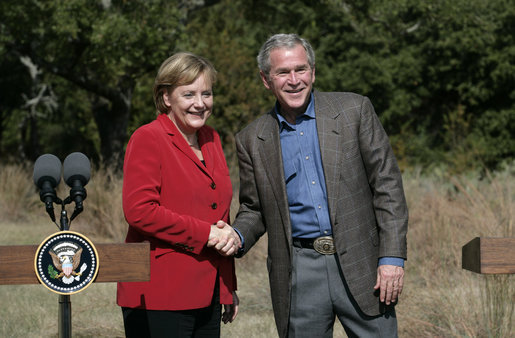

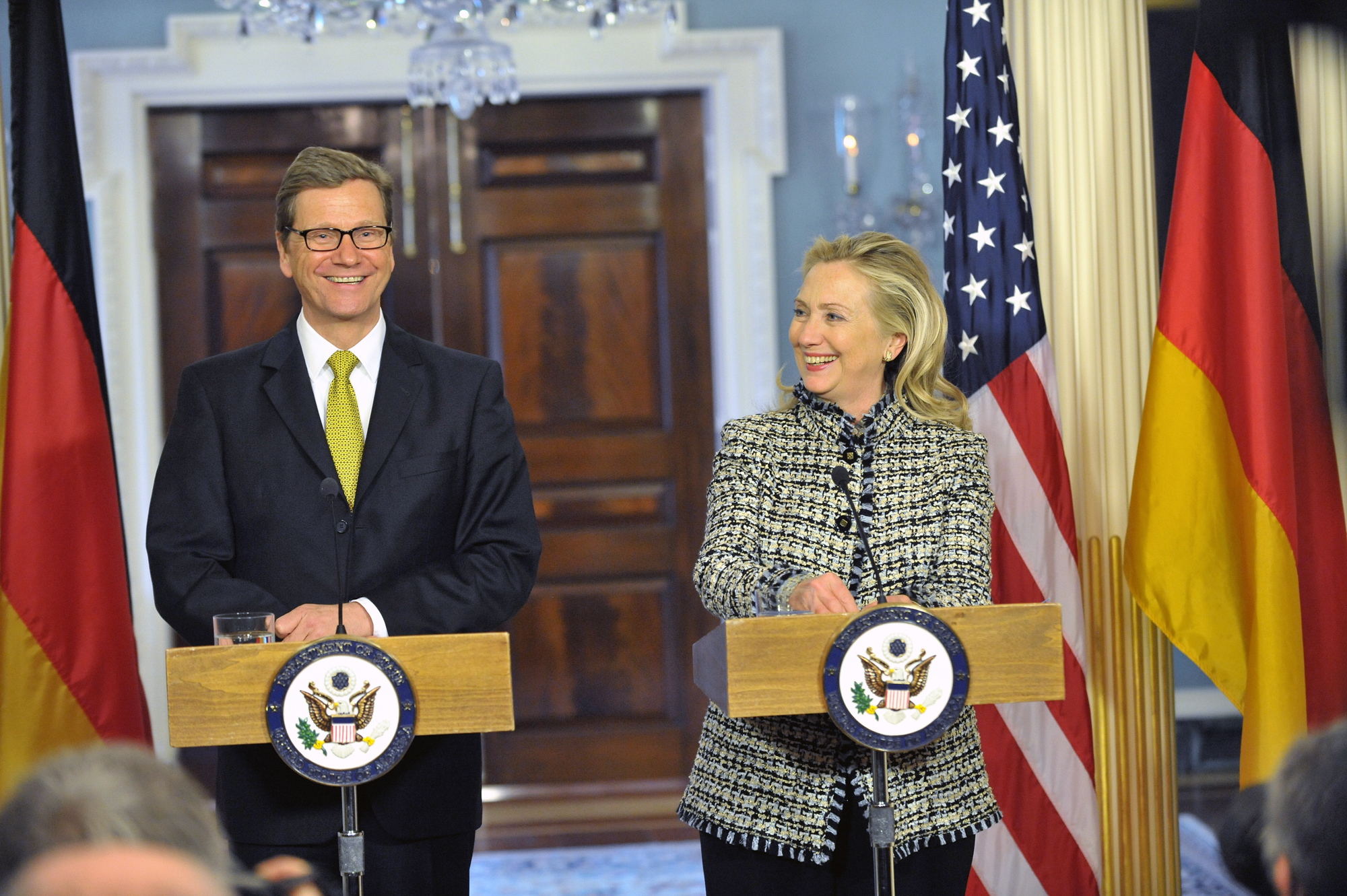

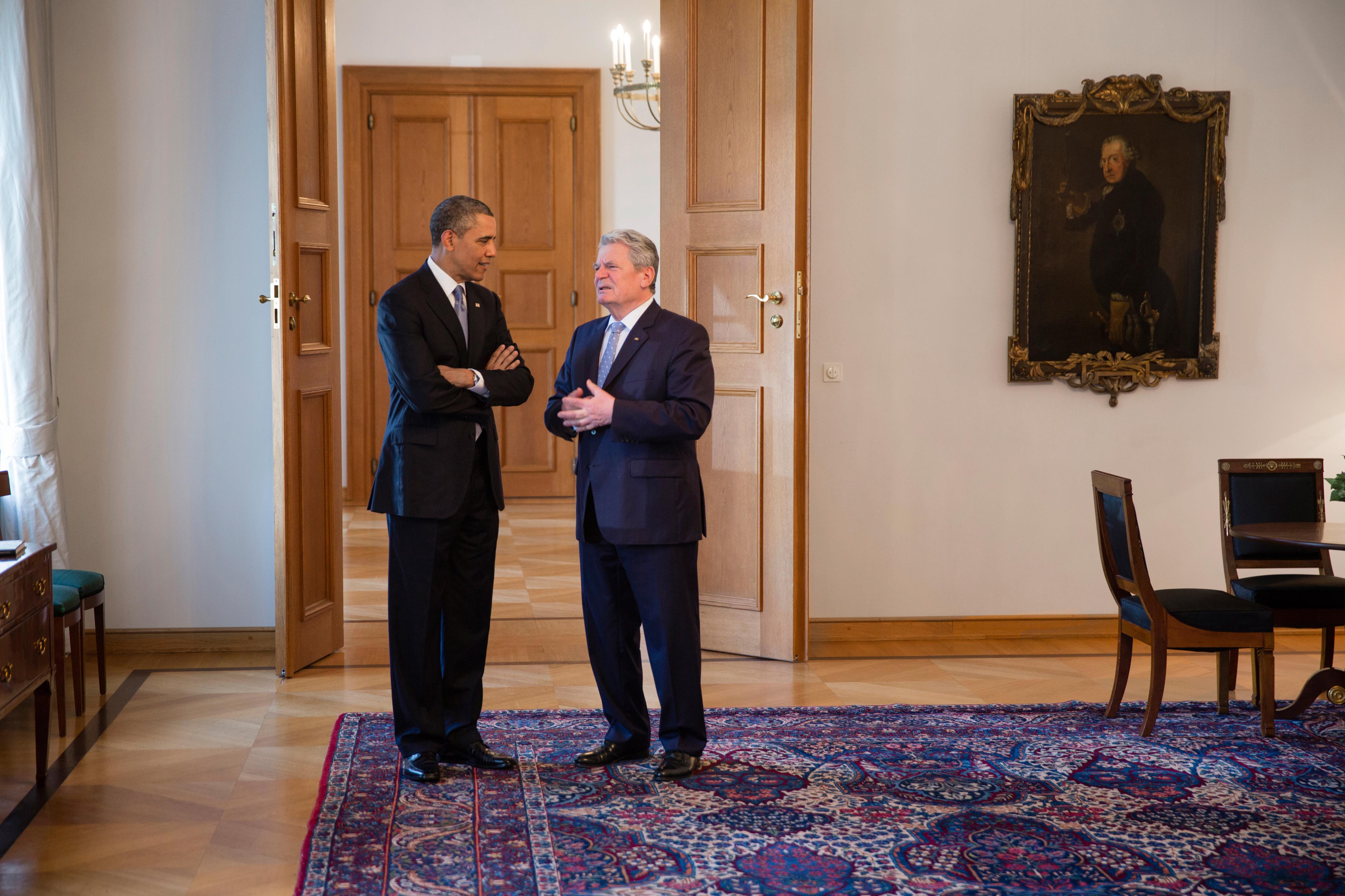

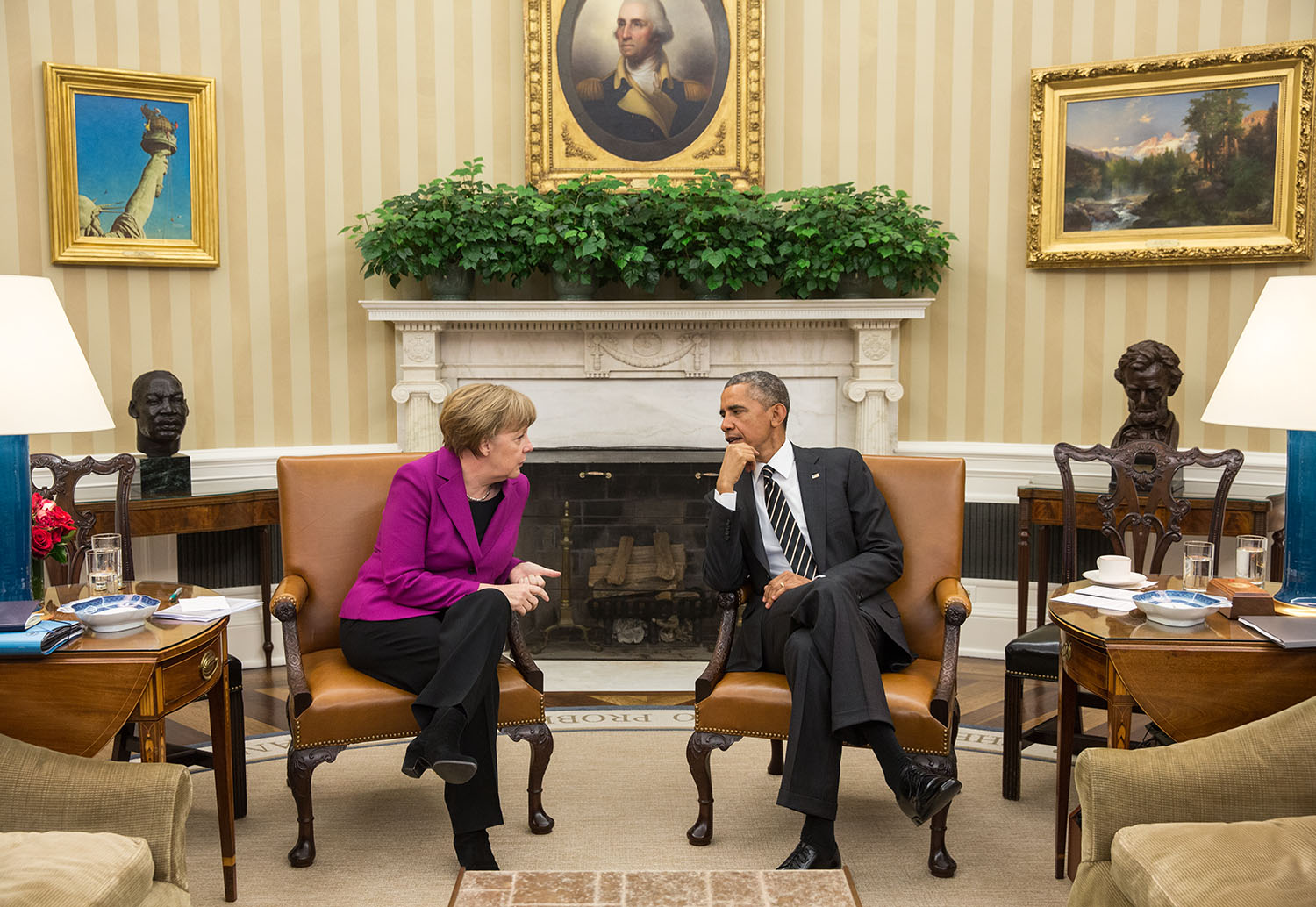

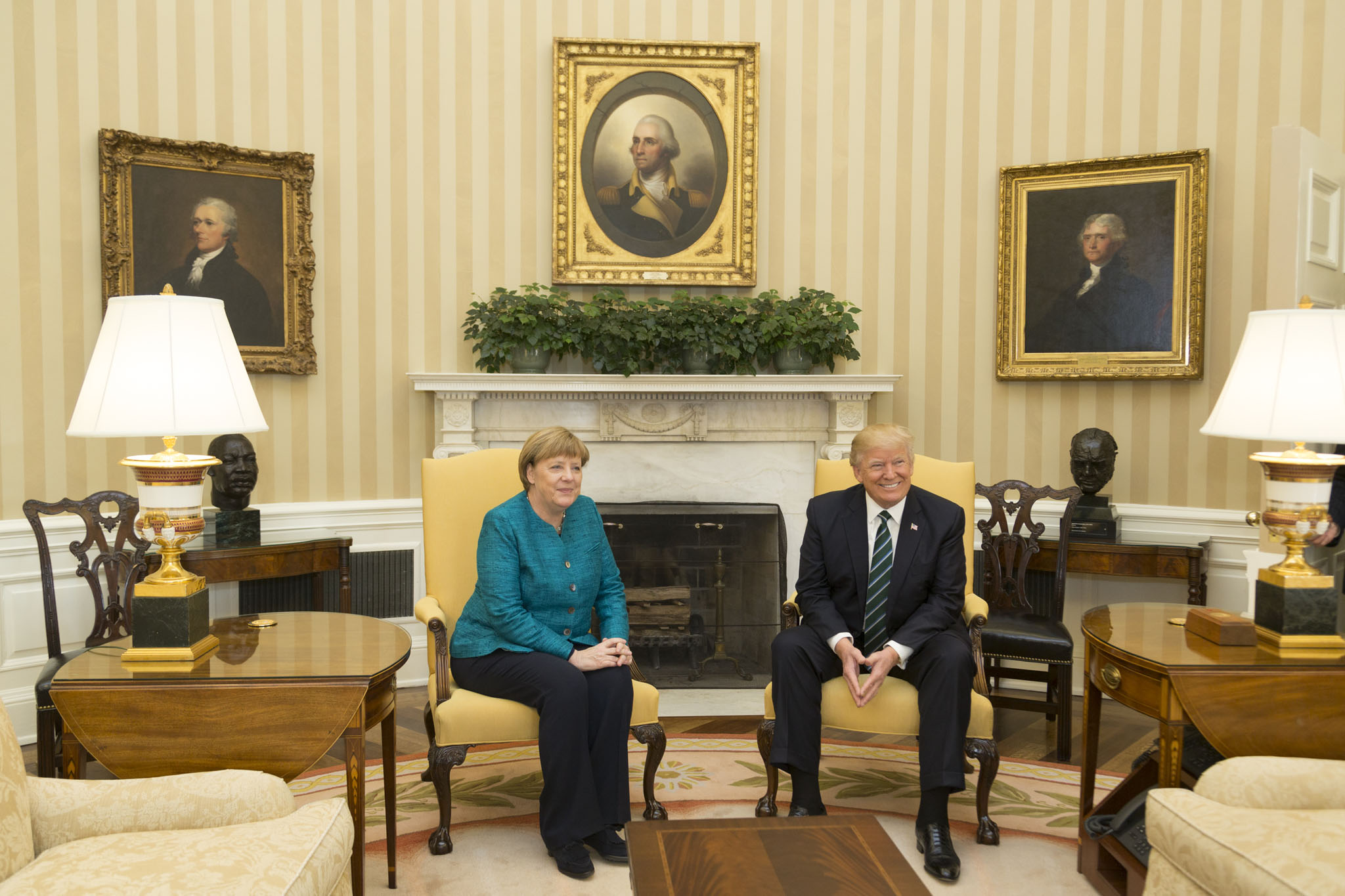

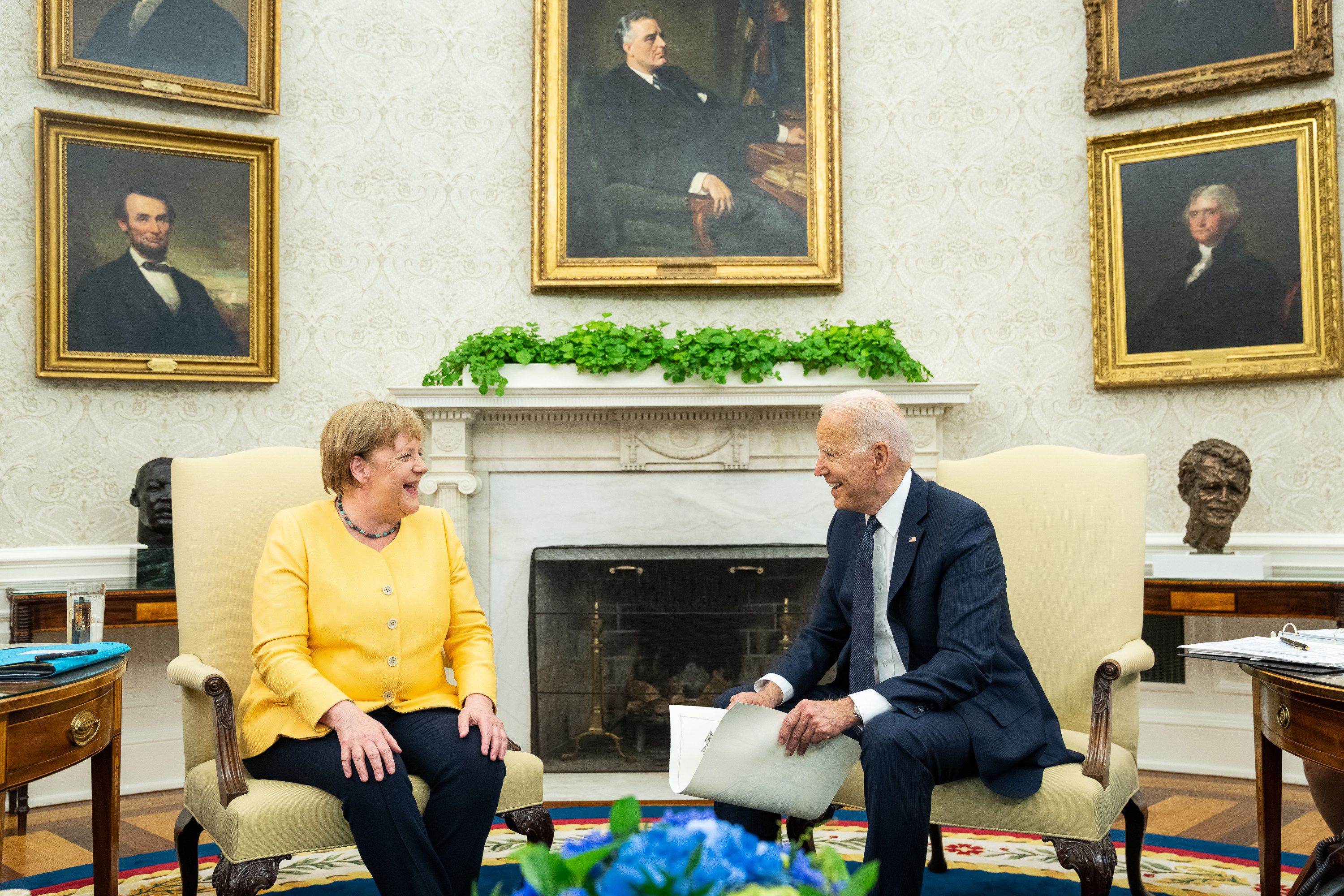

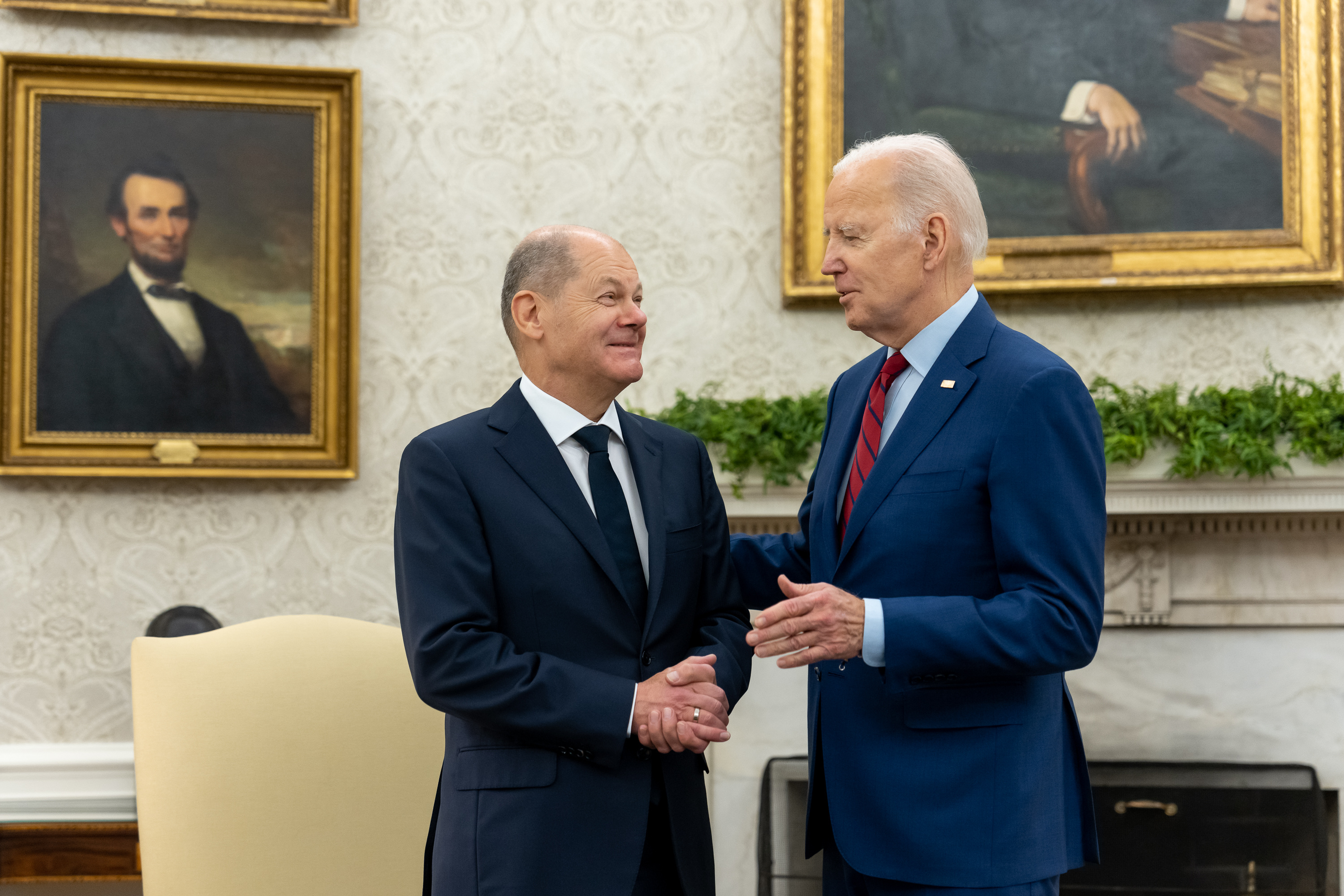

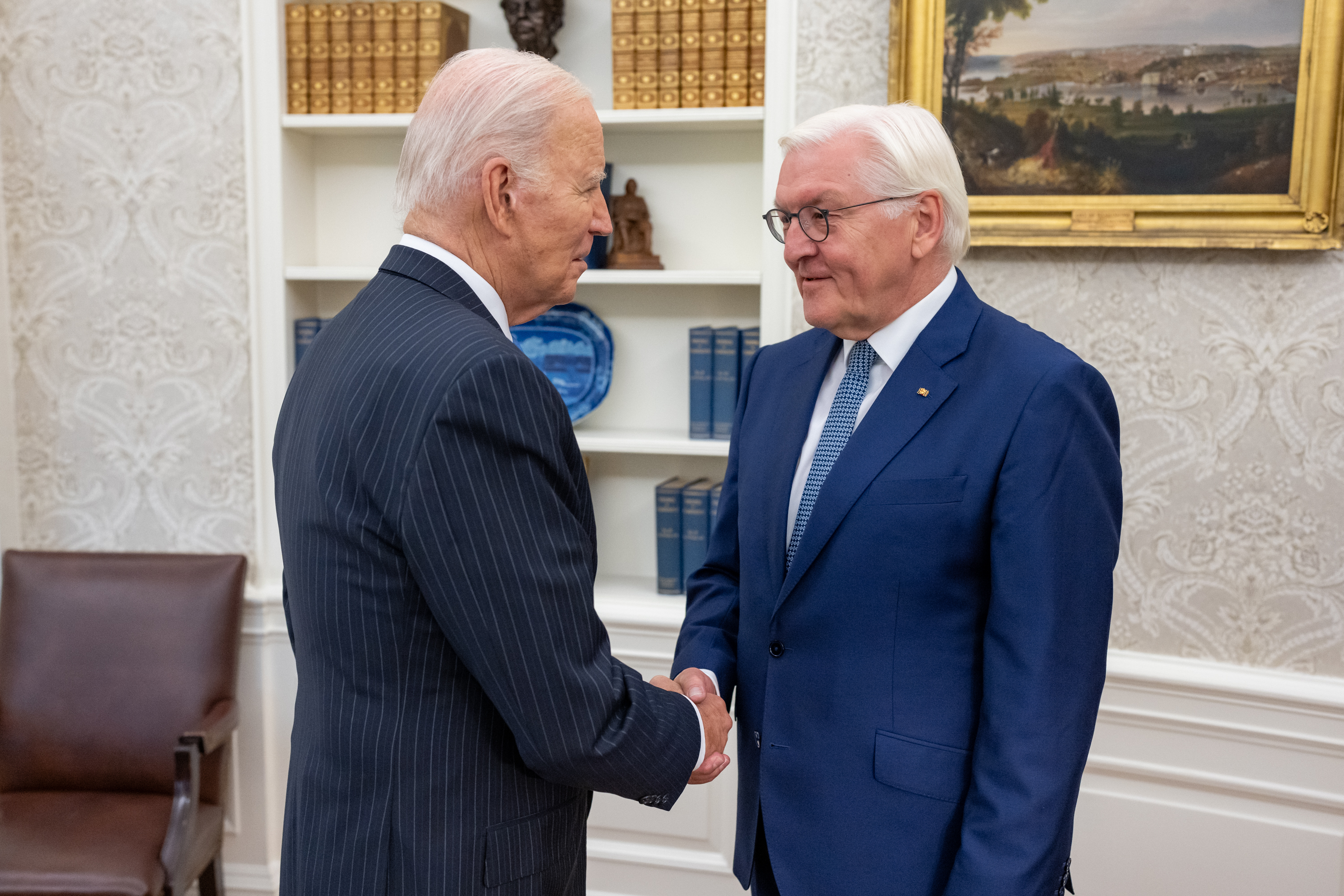

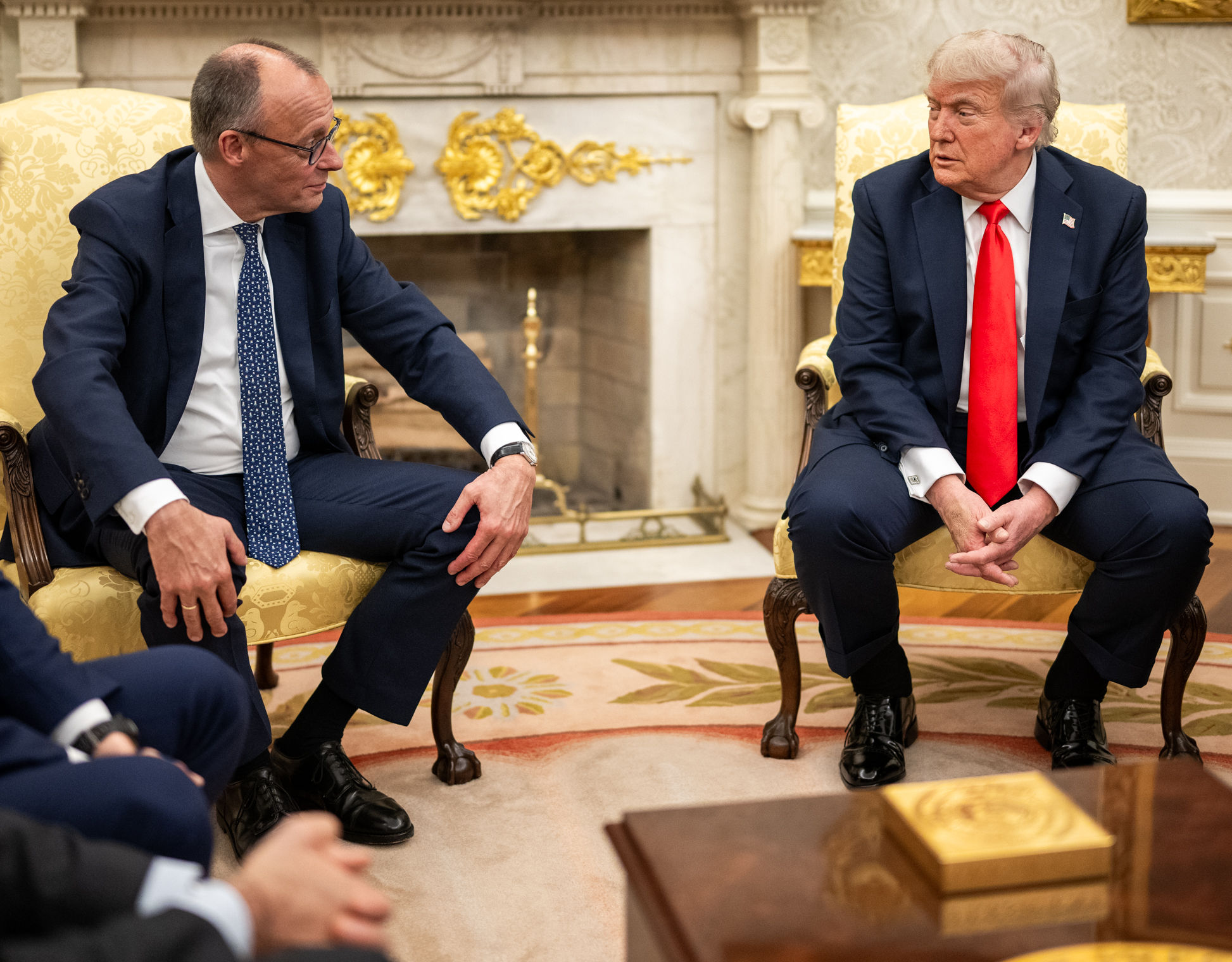

== Germany (Democratic Republic of) ==
Table of Trips
| Start | End | Guest | Title | Reason |
|---|---|---|---|---|
| June 11, 1990 | June 11, 1990 | Lothar de Maizière | Prime Minister | Official Visit. |

== Greece ==
Table of Trips
| Start | End | Guest | Title | Reason |
|---|---|---|---|---|
| June 10, 1942 | June 16, 1942 | George II | King | In U.S. June 10–28, visiting New York City and Philadelphia. |
| June 10, 1942 | June 16, 1942 | Emmanouil Tsouderos | Prime Minister | Accompanied King George II. |
| December 19, 1946 | December 22, 1946 | Konstantinos Tsaldaris | Prime Minister | Addressed the UN on frontier problems with neighboring states. Visited Washington D.C. as guest of the government. In U.S. December 5–24. |
| December 28, 1953 | December 31, 1953 | Paul I | King | At the invitation of the President. Afterwards visited Philadelphia, New York City, Boston, Toledo (Ohio), Detroit, Chicago, San Francisco, Los Angeles, the Grand Canyon, Houston, New Orleans, and Williamsburg. Private visit to New York City from November 24. Departed U.S. December 3. |
| November 15, 1956 | November 15, 1956 | Konstantinos Karamanlis | Prime Minister | Met with U.S. officials while attending a UN General Assembly session. |
| April 17, 1961 | April 20, 1961 | Konstantinos Karamanlis | Prime Minister | Official visit. Afterwards visited New York City. Departed U.S. April 24. |
| June 24, 1964 | June 26, 1964 | Georgios Papandreou | Prime Minister | Informal visit. In U.S. June 23. Visited Williamsburg and New York City. |
| September 11, 1967 | September 11, 1967 | Constantine II | King | Informal visit. Arrived in New York City August 24; visited Canada August 26 – September 9. Visited Newport. September 10 and 12. |
| May 30, 1978 | May 31, 1978 | Konstantinos Karamanlis | Prime Minister | Attended NATO Summit conference. |
| June 6, 1990 | June 6, 1990 | Konstantinos Mitsotakis | Prime Minister | Private visit. |
| December 11, 1991 | December 13, 1991 | Konstantinos Mitsotakis | Prime Minister | Official working visit. Later visited New York City. |
| November 16, 1992 | November 19, 1992 | Konstantinos Mitsotakis | Prime Minister | Met with President Bush and attended the opening of an exhibit at the National Gallery of Art. |
| April 22, 1994 | April 24, 1994 | Andreas Papandreou | Prime Minister | Official working visit. |
| April 7, 1996 | April 10, 1996 | Kostas Simitis | Prime Minister | Working visit. |
| May 7, 1996 | May 10, 1996 | Konstantinos Stephanopoulos | President | State Visit. Afterwards visited Atlanta, Los Angeles, San Francisco, Sacramento, and Chicago. |
| April 23, 1999 | April 25, 1999 | Kostas Simitis | Prime Minister | Attended NATO's 50th Anniversary Summit. |
| January 9, 2002 | January 11, 2002 | Kostas Simitis | Prime Minister | Working visit. |
| June 24, 2003 | June 26, 2003 | Kostas Simitis | Prime Minister | Working visit. Met with President Bush at the U.S.-EU Summit meeting. |
| May 19, 2004 | May 21, 2004 | Kostas Karamanlis | Prime Minister | Working visit. |
| May 20, 2005 | May 20, 2005 | Kostas Karamanlis | Prime Minister | Working visit. |
| March 8, 2010 | March 9, 2010 | George Papandreou | Prime Minister | Working visit. |
| August 8, 2013 | August 8, 2013 | Antonios Samaras | Prime Minister | Working visit. |
| October 17, 2017 | October 17, 2017 | Alexis Tsipras | Prime Minister | Working visit. |
| January 7, 2020 | January 7, 2020 | Kyriakos Mitsotakis | Prime Minister | Official Working Visit. |
| May 16, 2022 | May 16, 2022 | Kyriakos Mitsotakis | Prime Minister | Official Working Visit. |
| July 10, 2024 | July 11, 2024 | Kyriakos Mitsotakis | Prime Minister | Attended NATO 75th Anniversary Summit in Washington, D.C. |

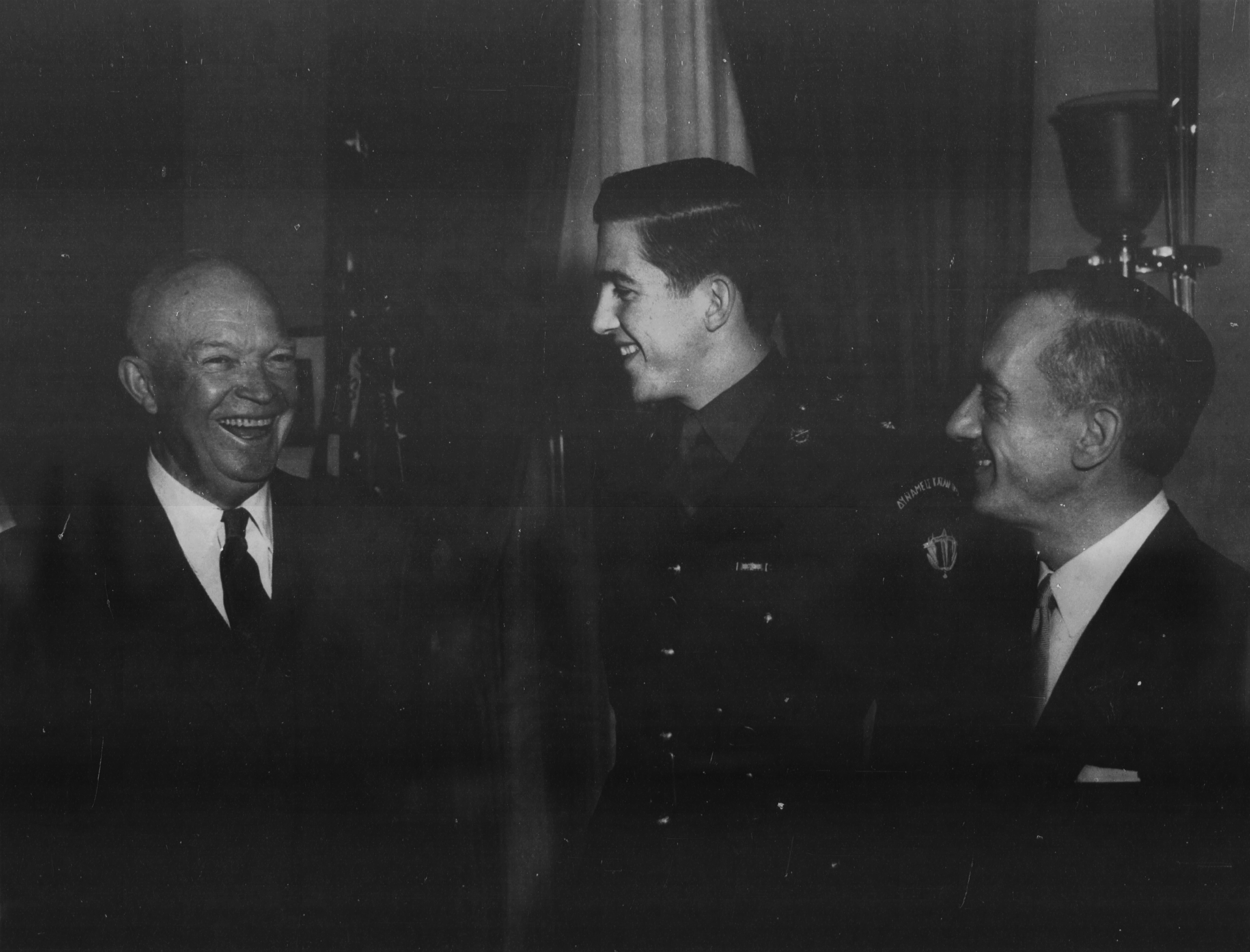

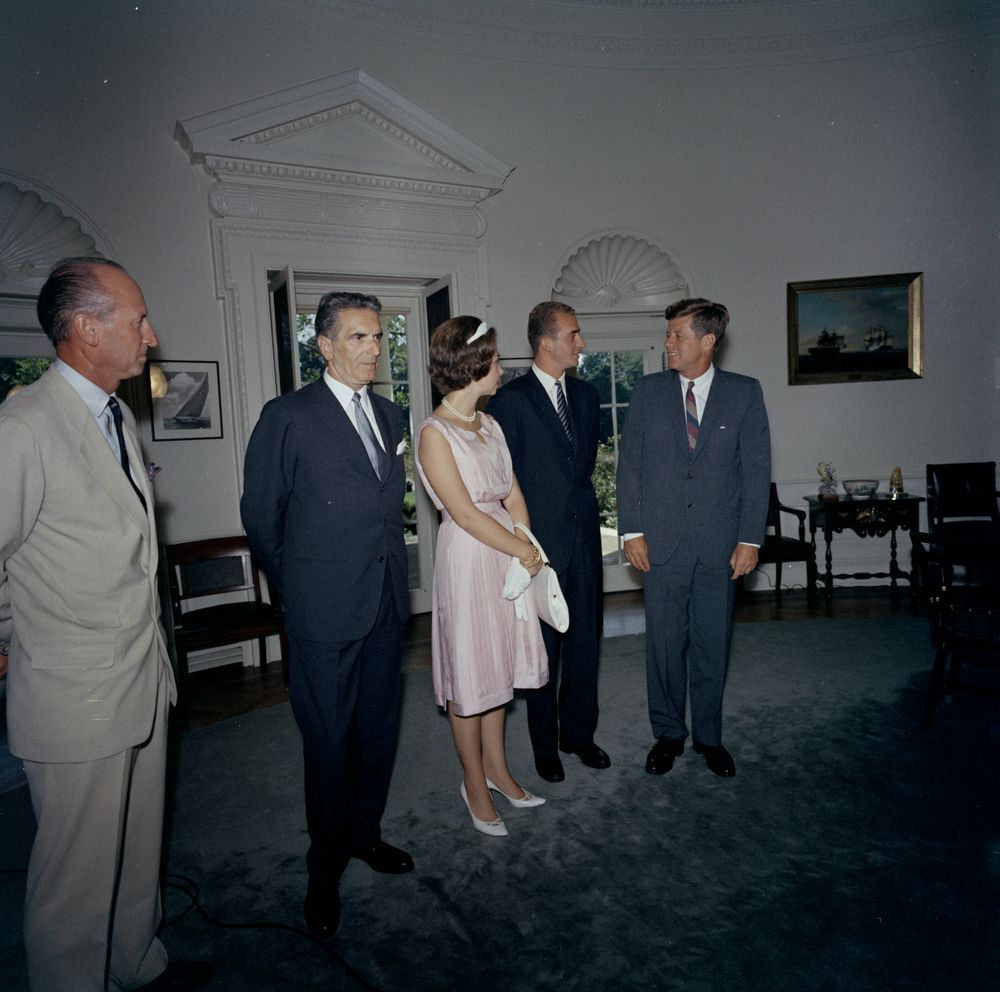

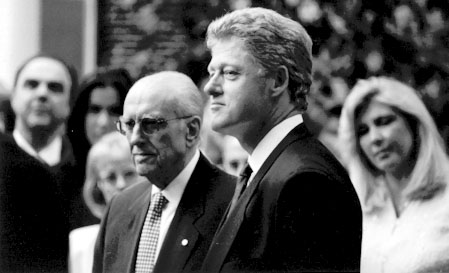

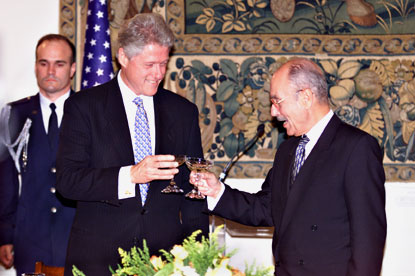

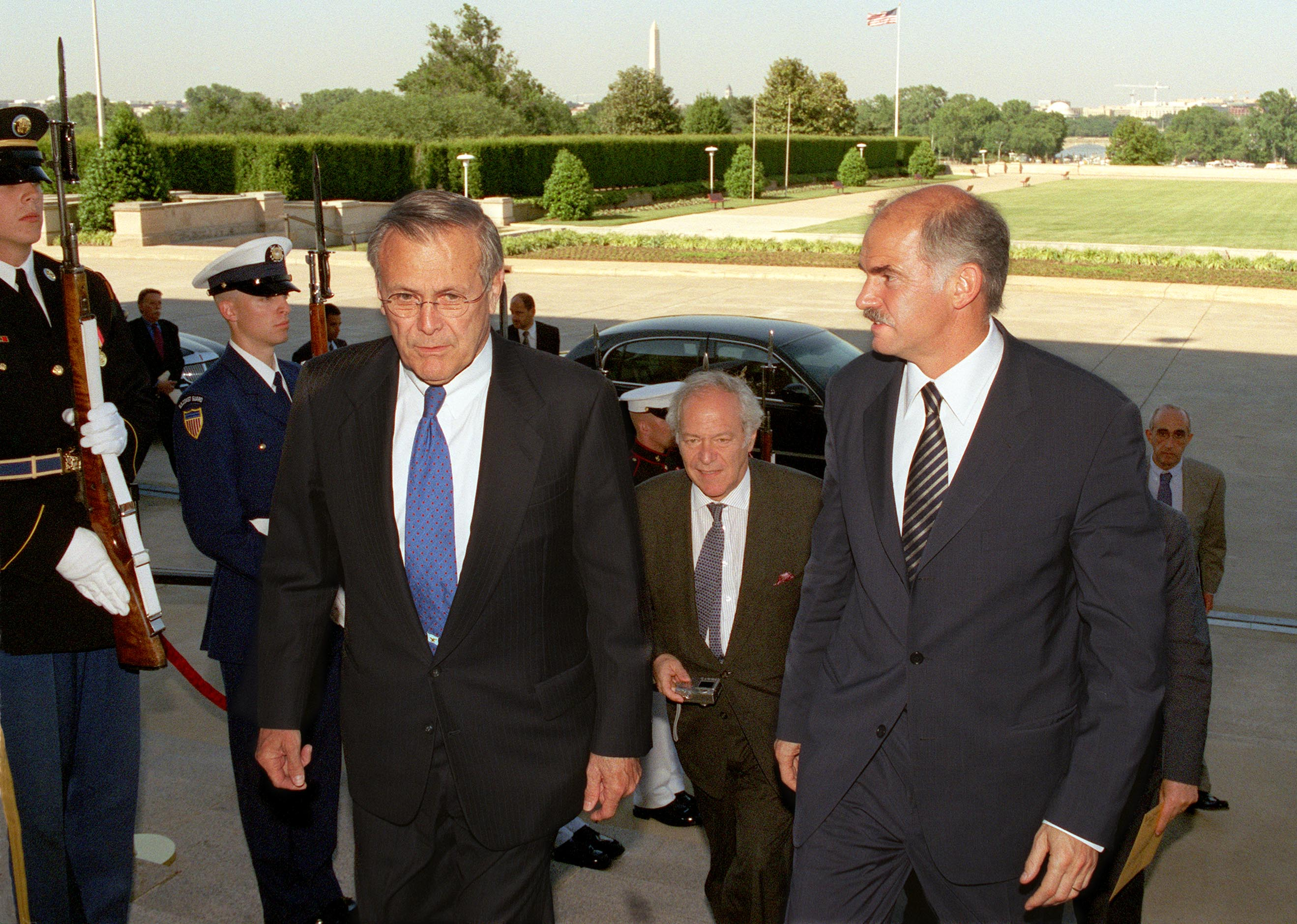

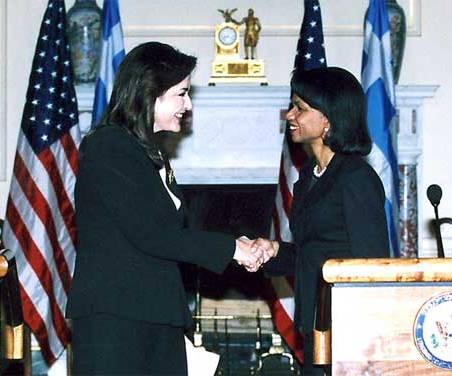

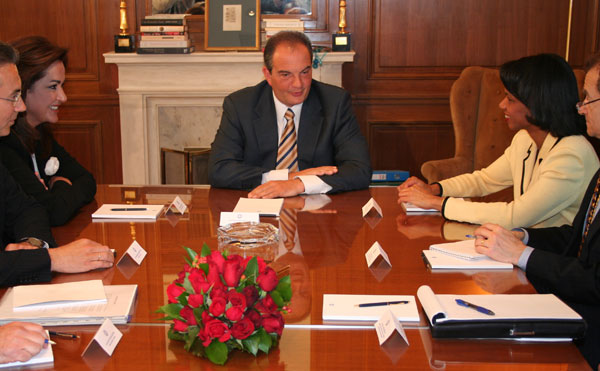

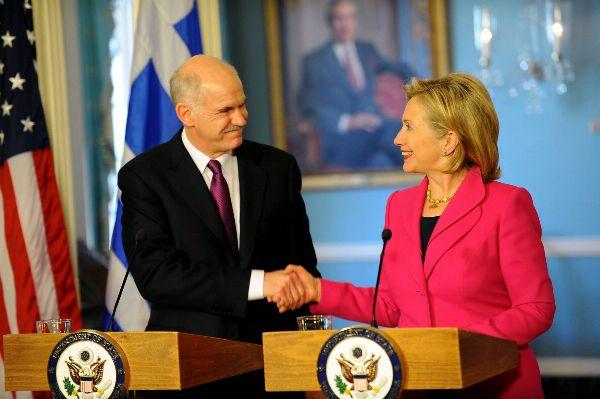

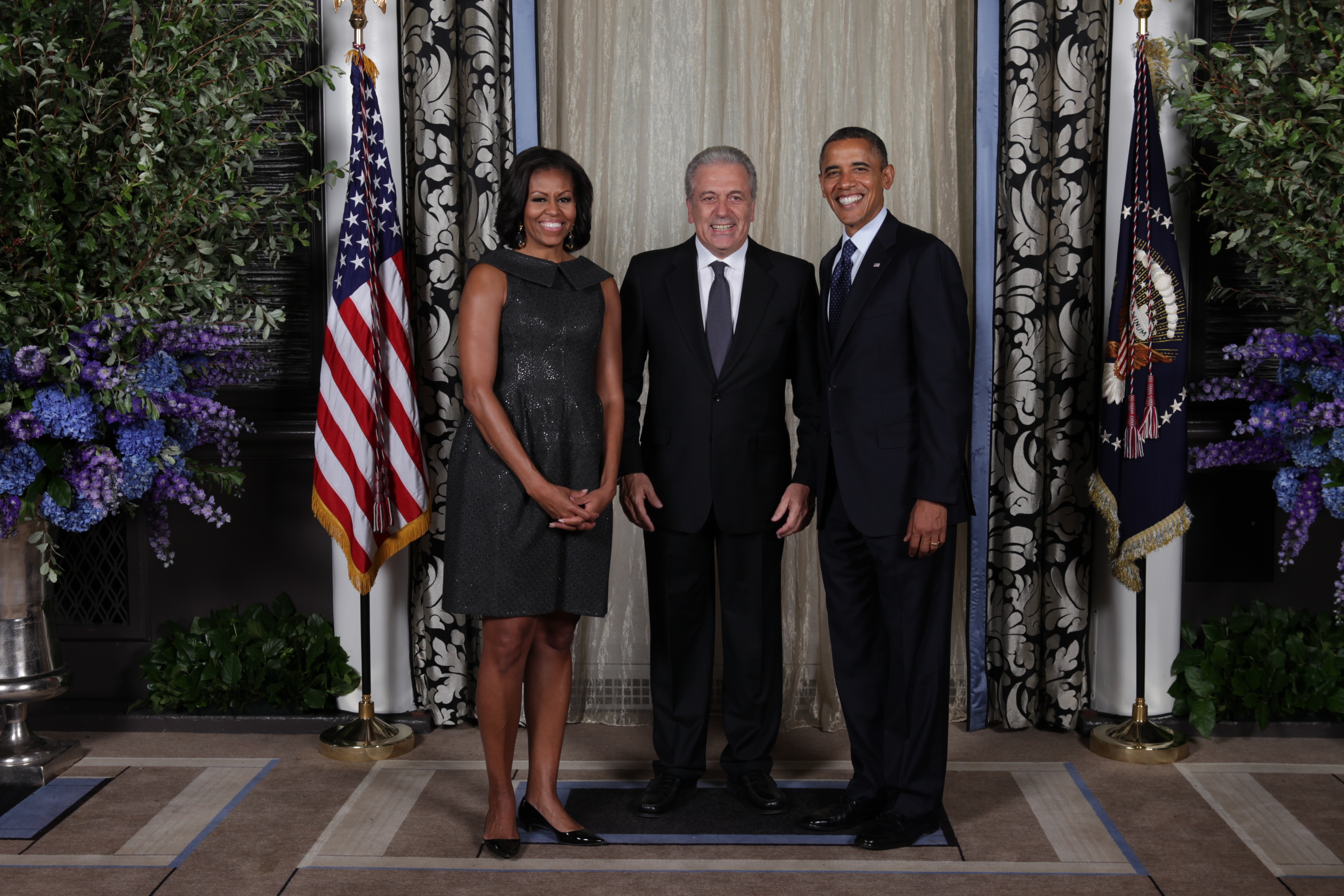

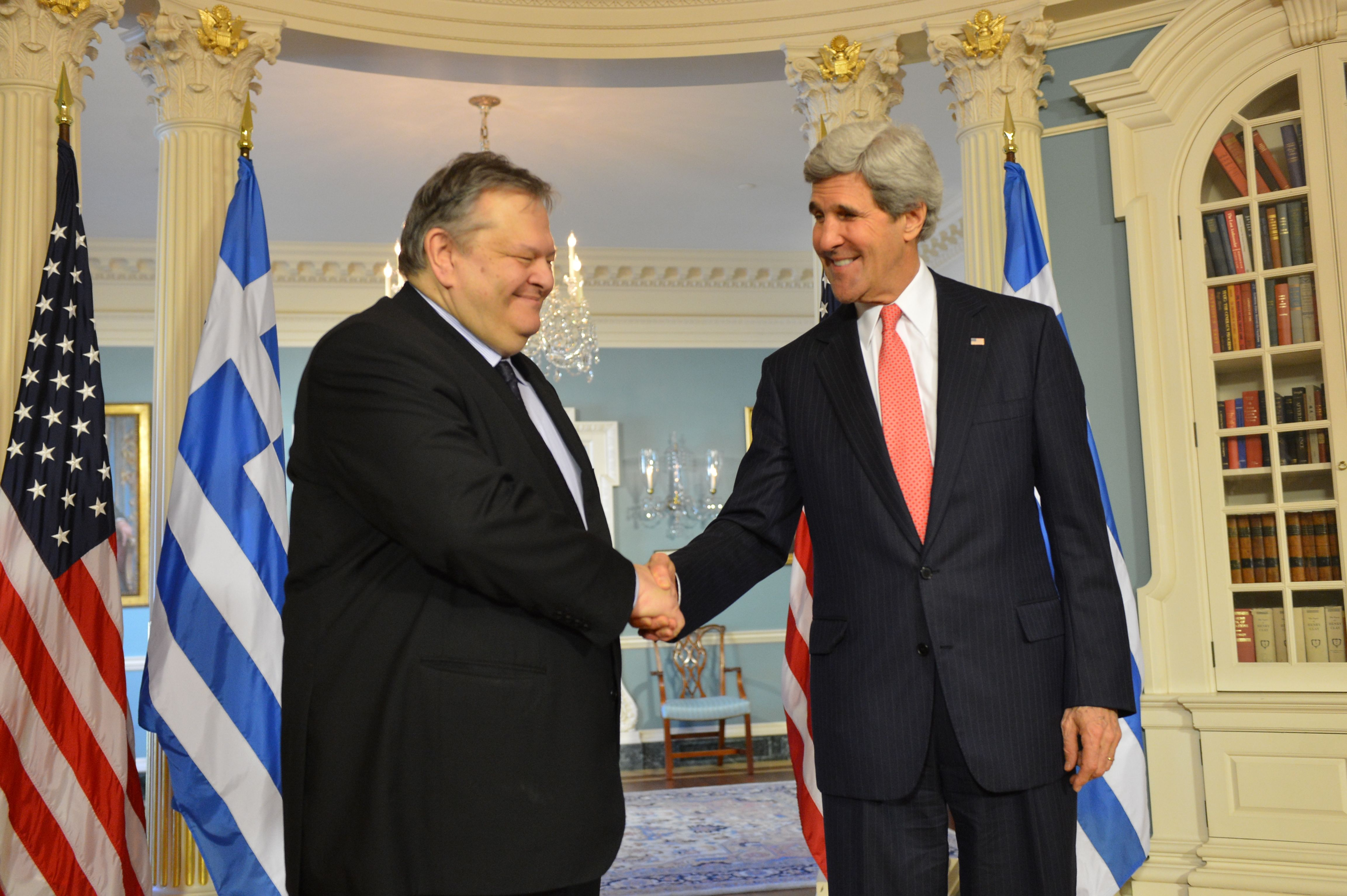

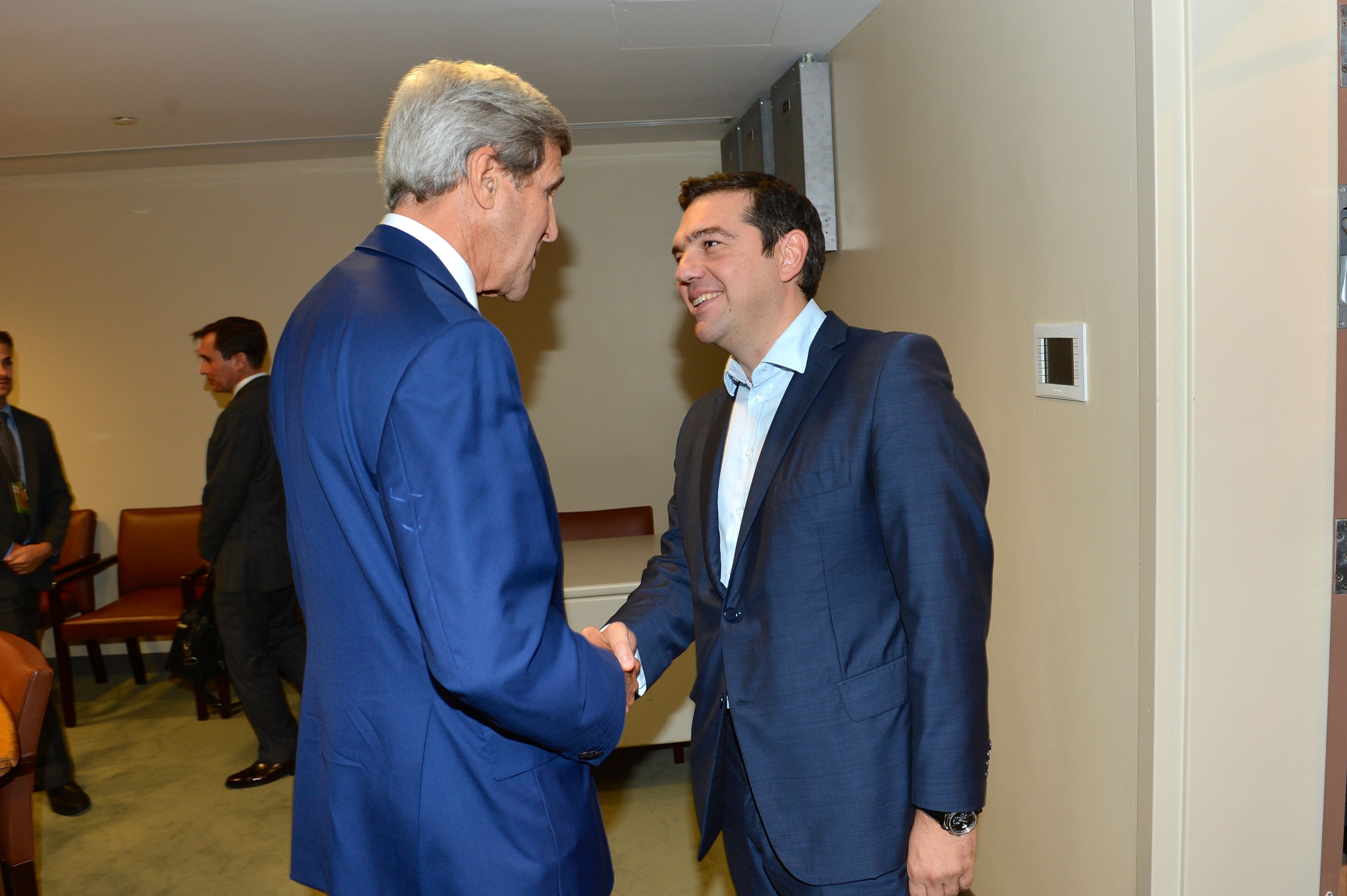

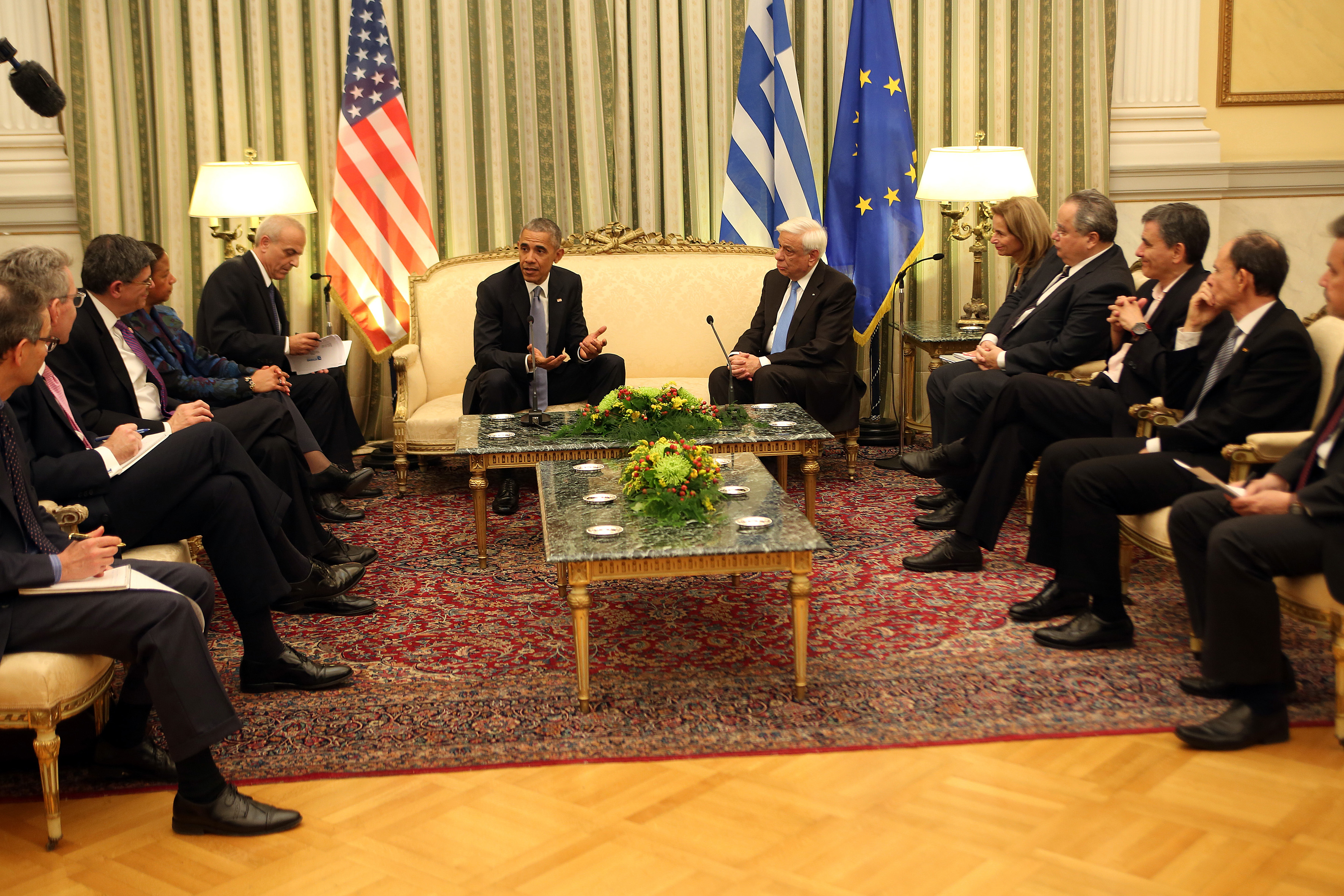

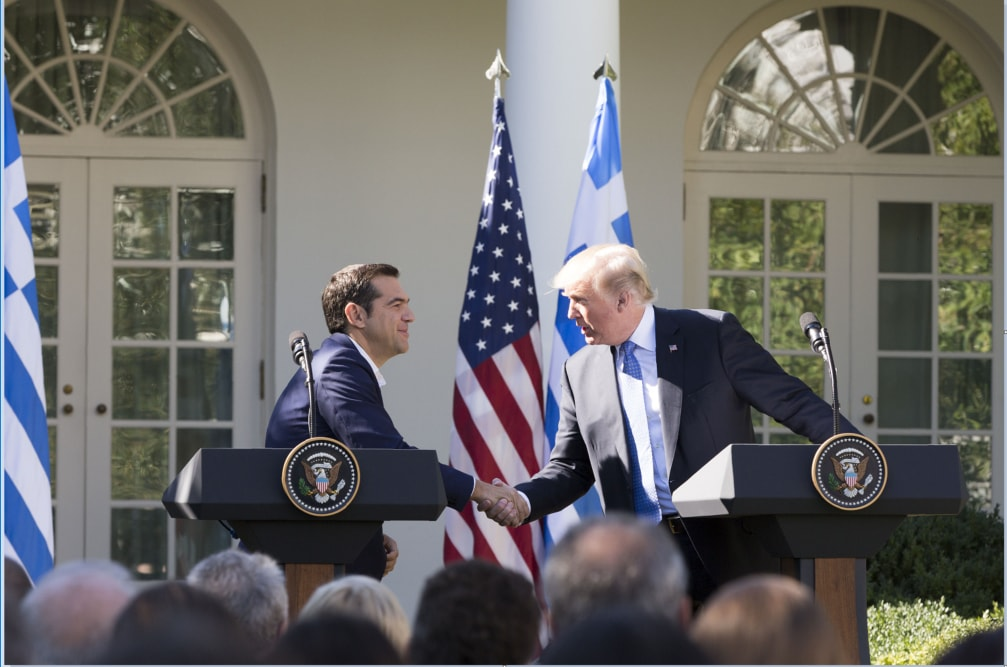

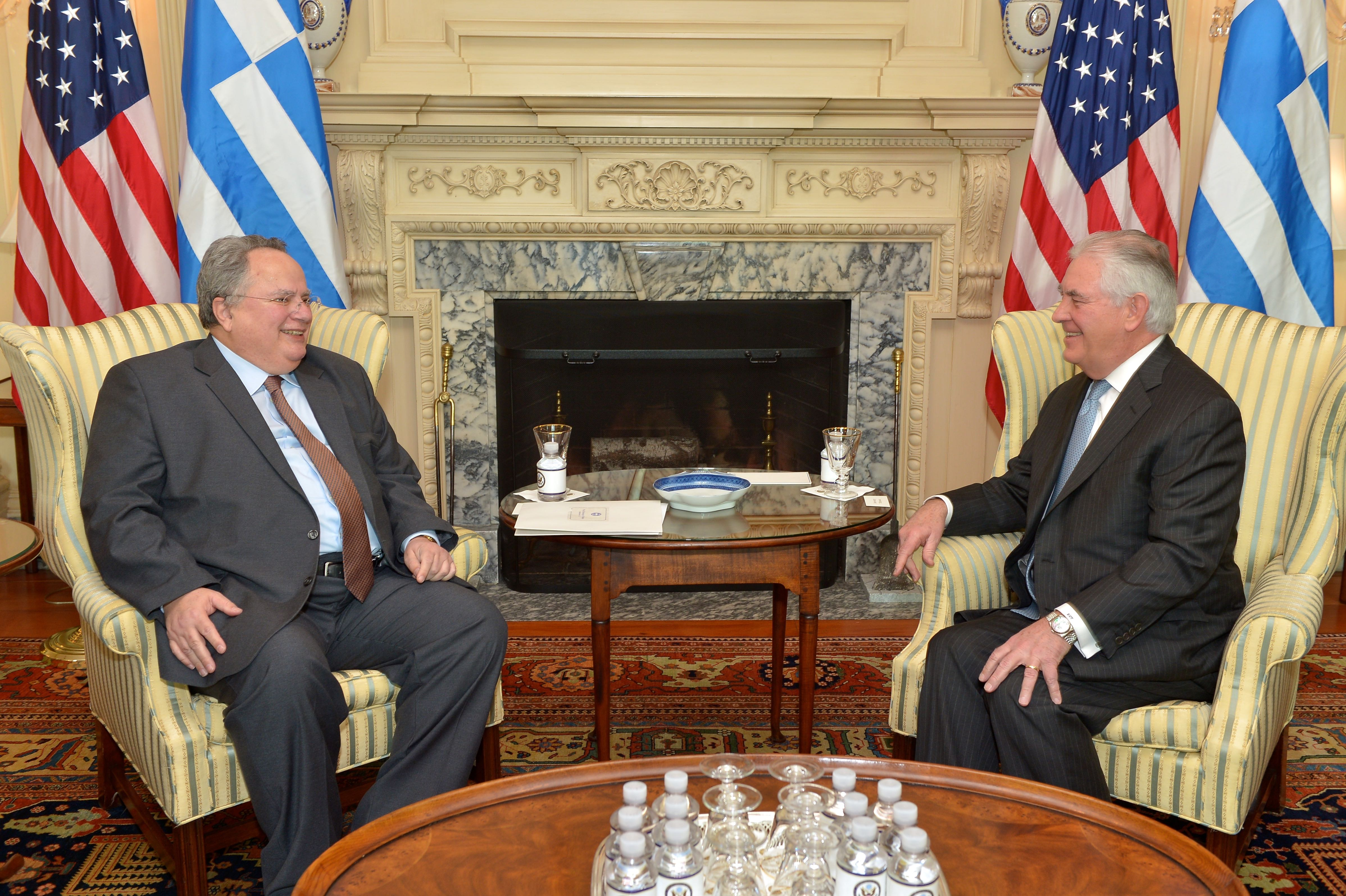

== Hungary ==
Table of Trips
| Start | End | Guest | Title | Reason |
|---|---|---|---|---|
| June 11, 1946 | June 17, 1946 | Ferenc Nagy | Prime Minister | Official visit. Afterwards visited New York City. Departed U.S. June 19. |
| July 26, 1988 | July 28, 1988 | Károly Grósz | Prime Minister | Official Working Visit. |
| May 18, 1990 | May 18, 1990 | Árpád Göncz | President | Official Working Visit. |
| October 18, 1990 | October 18, 1990 | József Antall | Prime Minister | Private visit. |
| May 23, 1991 | May 23, 1991 | Árpád Göncz | President | Met with President Bush during a private visit. |
| October 4, 1991 | October 4, 1991 | József Antall | Prime Minister | Met with President Bush during a private visit. |
| April 20, 1993 | April 22, 1993 | Árpád Göncz | President | Attended dedication of the Holocaust Memorial Museum and met with President Bill Clinton on April 21. |
| June 20, 1994 | June 21, 1994 | Árpád Göncz | President | Met with President Clinton during a private visit. |
| March 17, 1998 | March 18, 1998 | Árpád Göncz | President | Private visit. |
| October 5, 1998 | October 8, 1998 | Viktor Orbán | Prime Minister | Working visit. |
| April 23, 1999 | April 25, 1999 | Viktor Orbán | Prime Minister | Attended NATO's 50th Anniversary Summit. |
| June 6, 1999 | June 9, 1999 | Árpád Göncz | President | State visit. Afterwards visited Chicago. |
| November 7, 2002 | November 9, 2002 | Péter Medgyessy | Prime Minister | Working visit. |
| June 21, 2004 | June 23, 2004 | Péter Medgyessy | Prime Minister | Working visit. |
| October 3, 2005 | October 7, 2005 | Ferenc Gyurcsány | Prime Minister | Working visit. |
| May 20, 2012 | May 21, 2012 | Viktor Orbán | Prime Minister | Attended the NATO Summit meeting in Chicago. |
| March 31, 2016 | April 1, 2016 | Viktor Orbán | Prime Minister | Attended the Nuclear Security Summit. |
| May 12, 2019 | May 13, 2019 | Viktor Orbán | Prime Minister | Working visit. |
| July 10, 2024 | July 11, 2024 | Viktor Orbán | Prime Minister | Attended NATO 75th Anniversary Summit in Washington, D.C. |
| November 7, 2025 | November 7, 2025 | Viktor Orbán | Prime Minister | Working visit. |

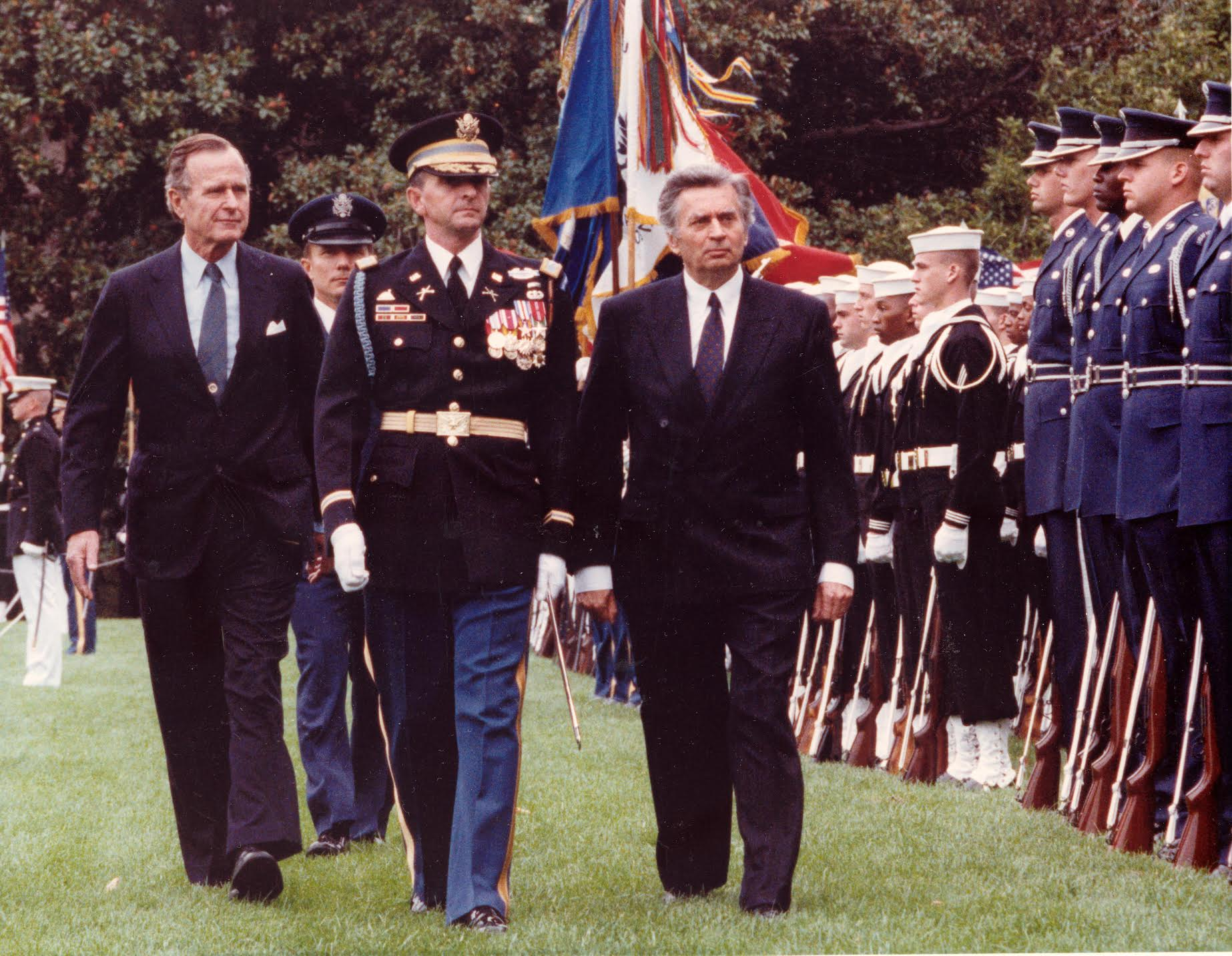

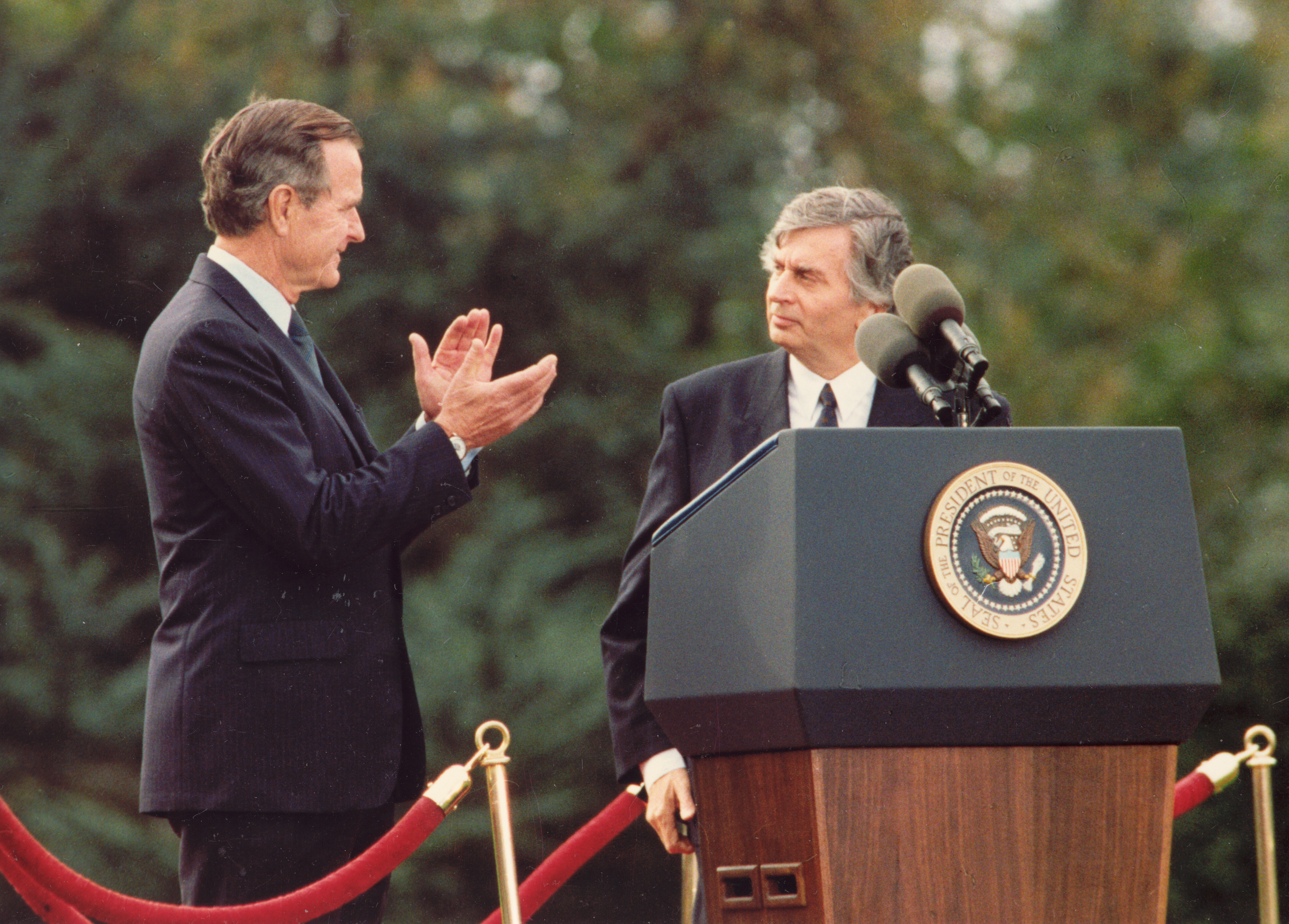

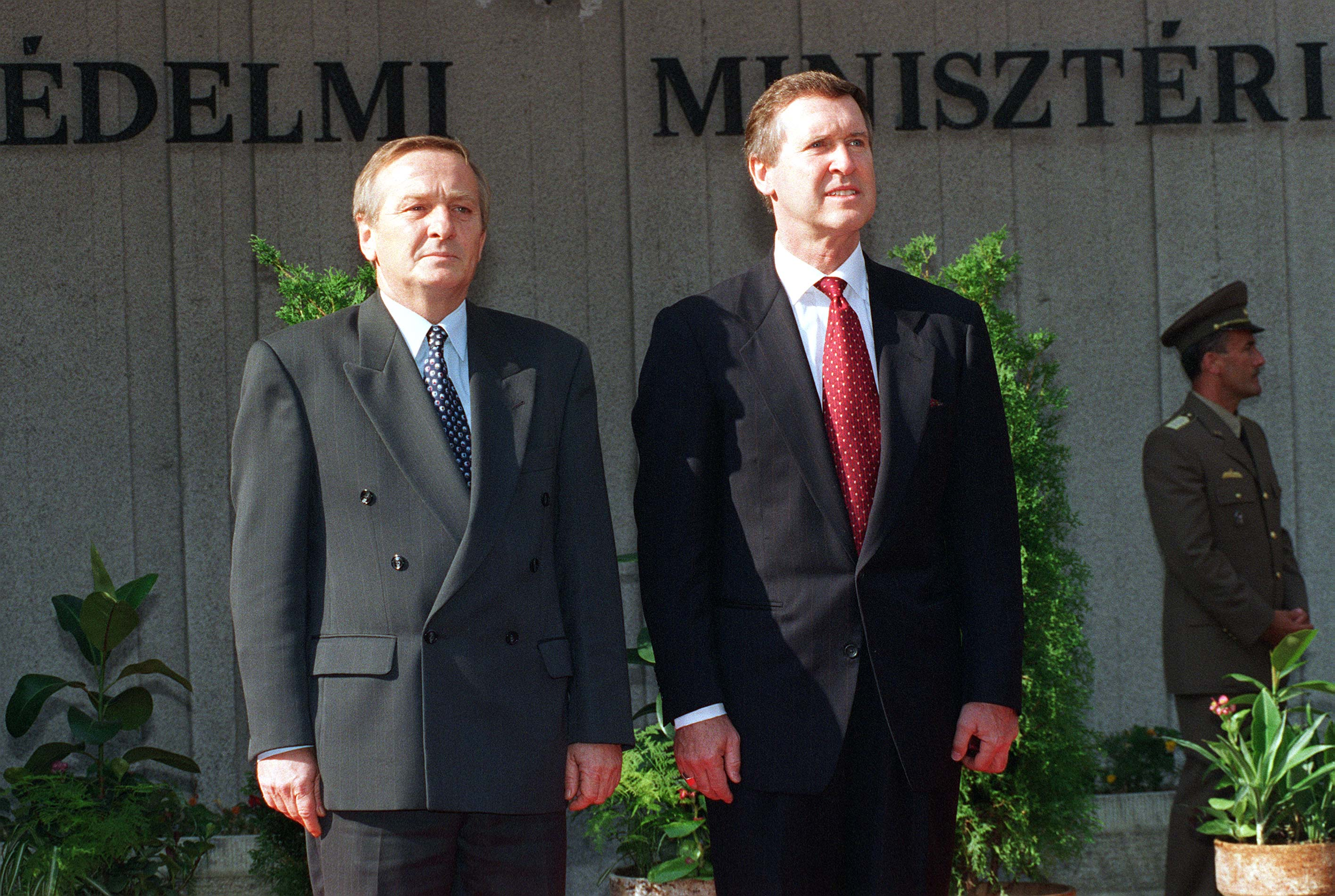

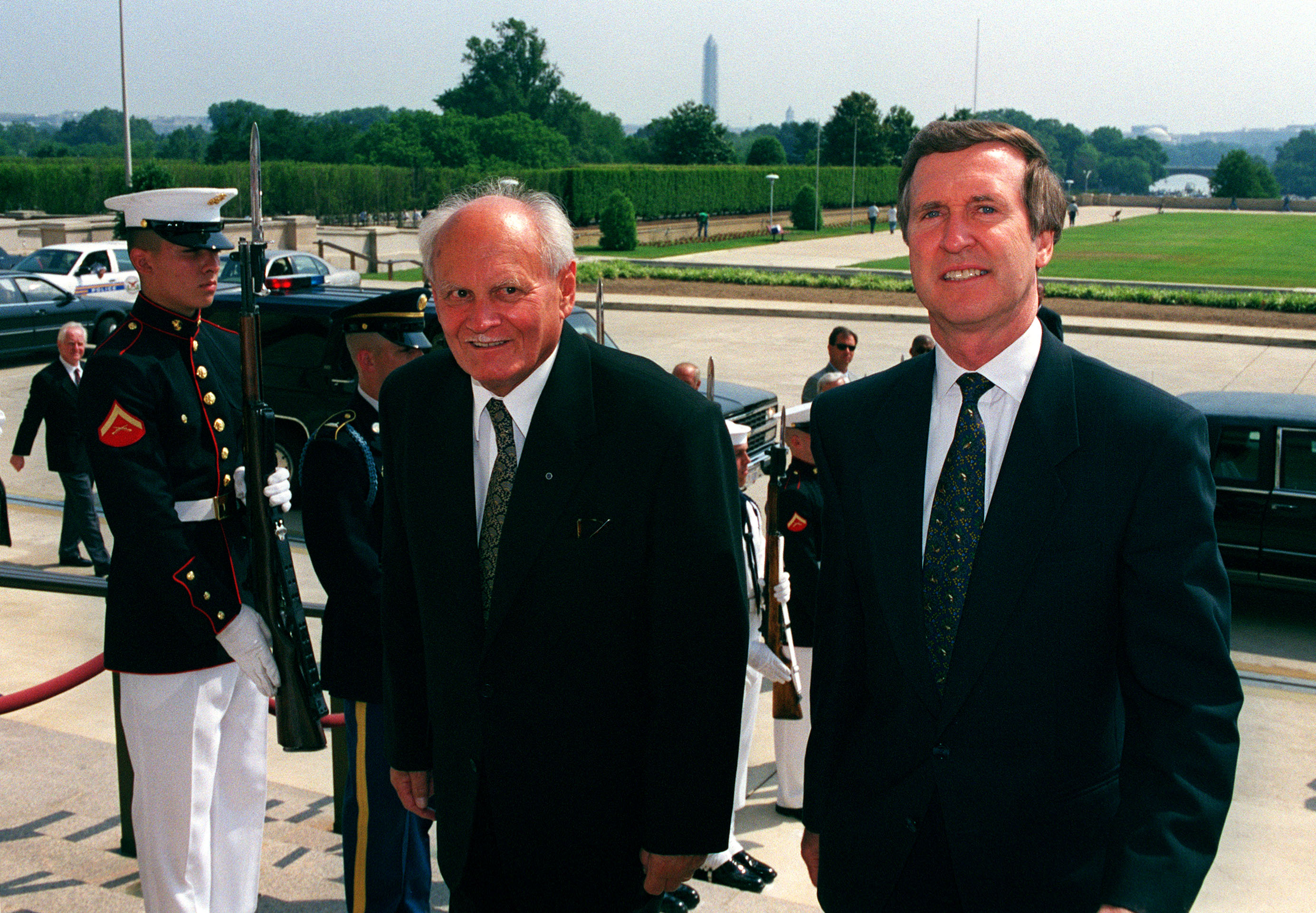

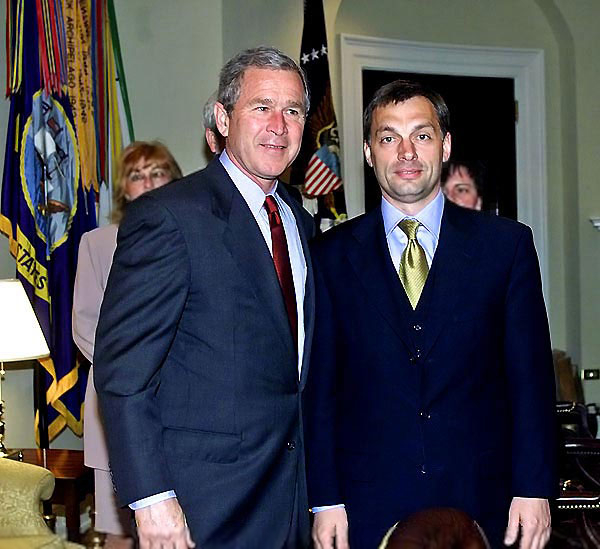

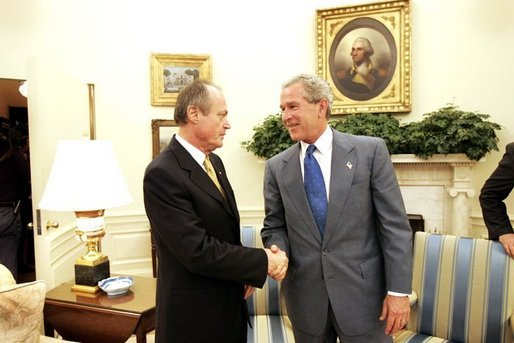

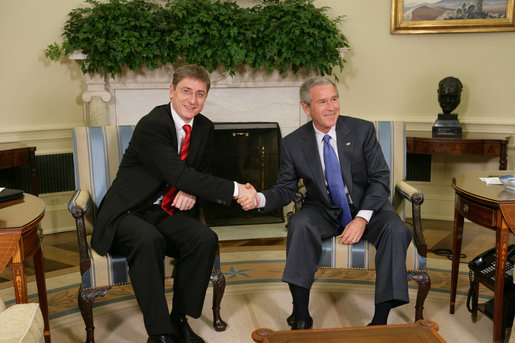

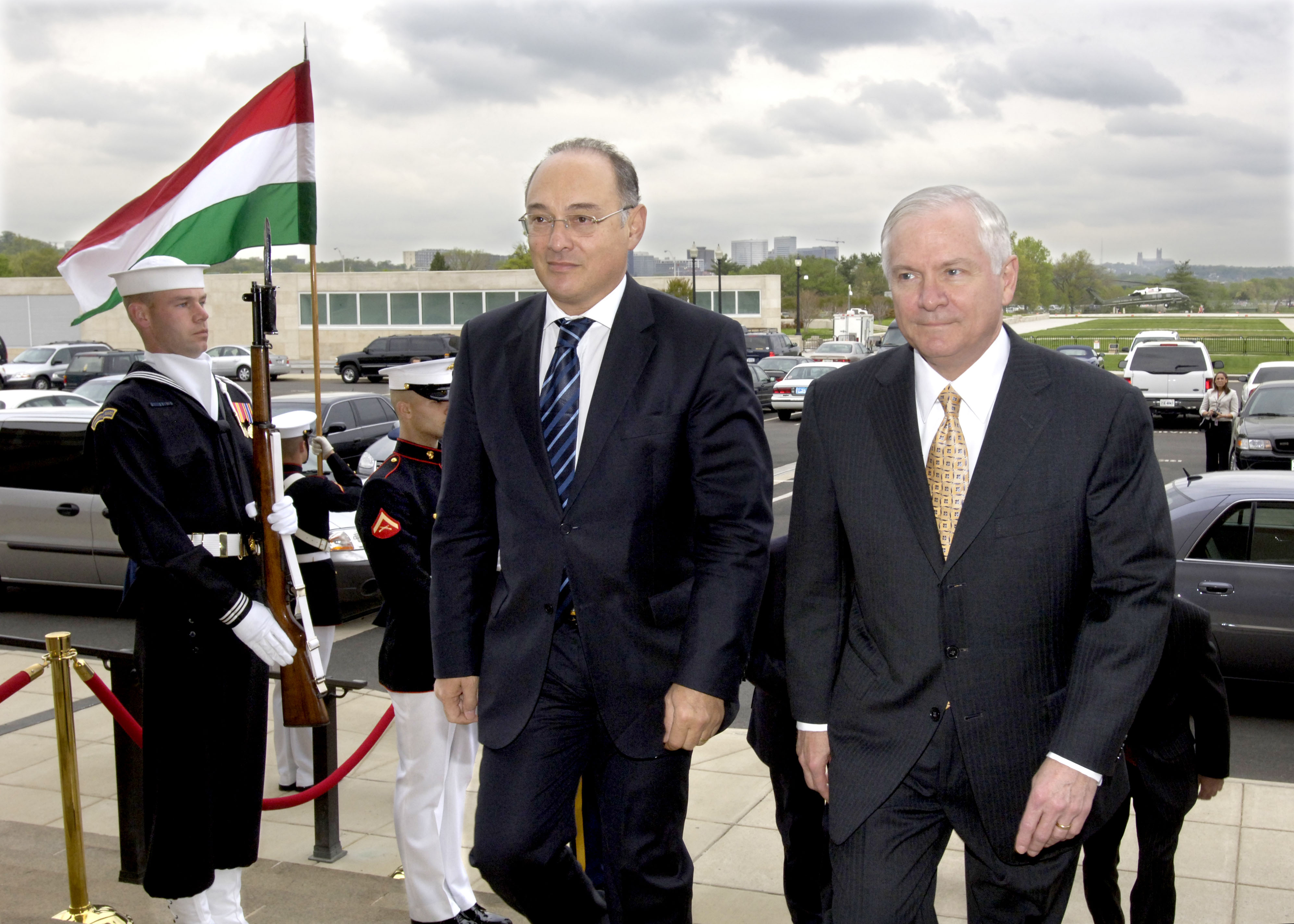

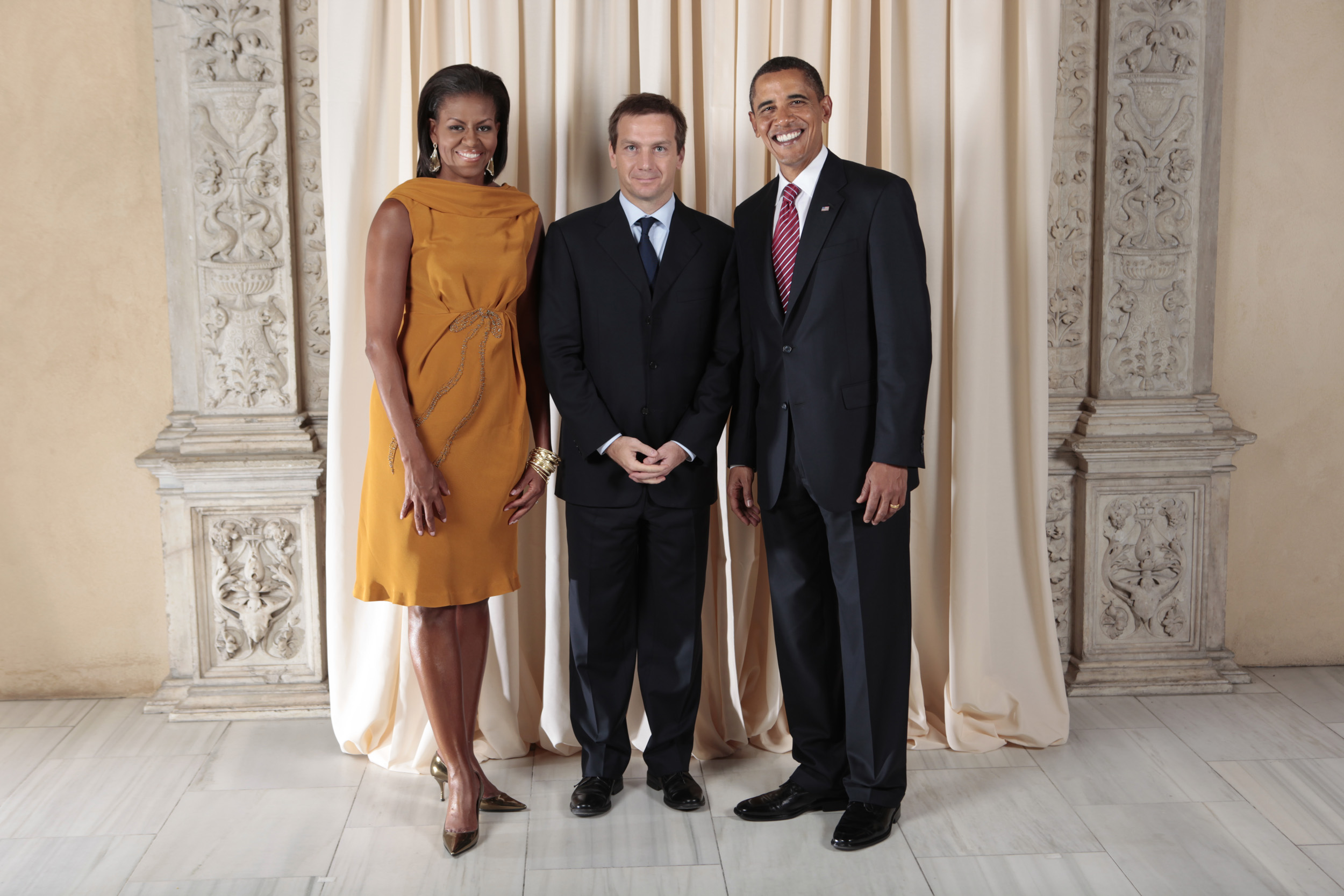

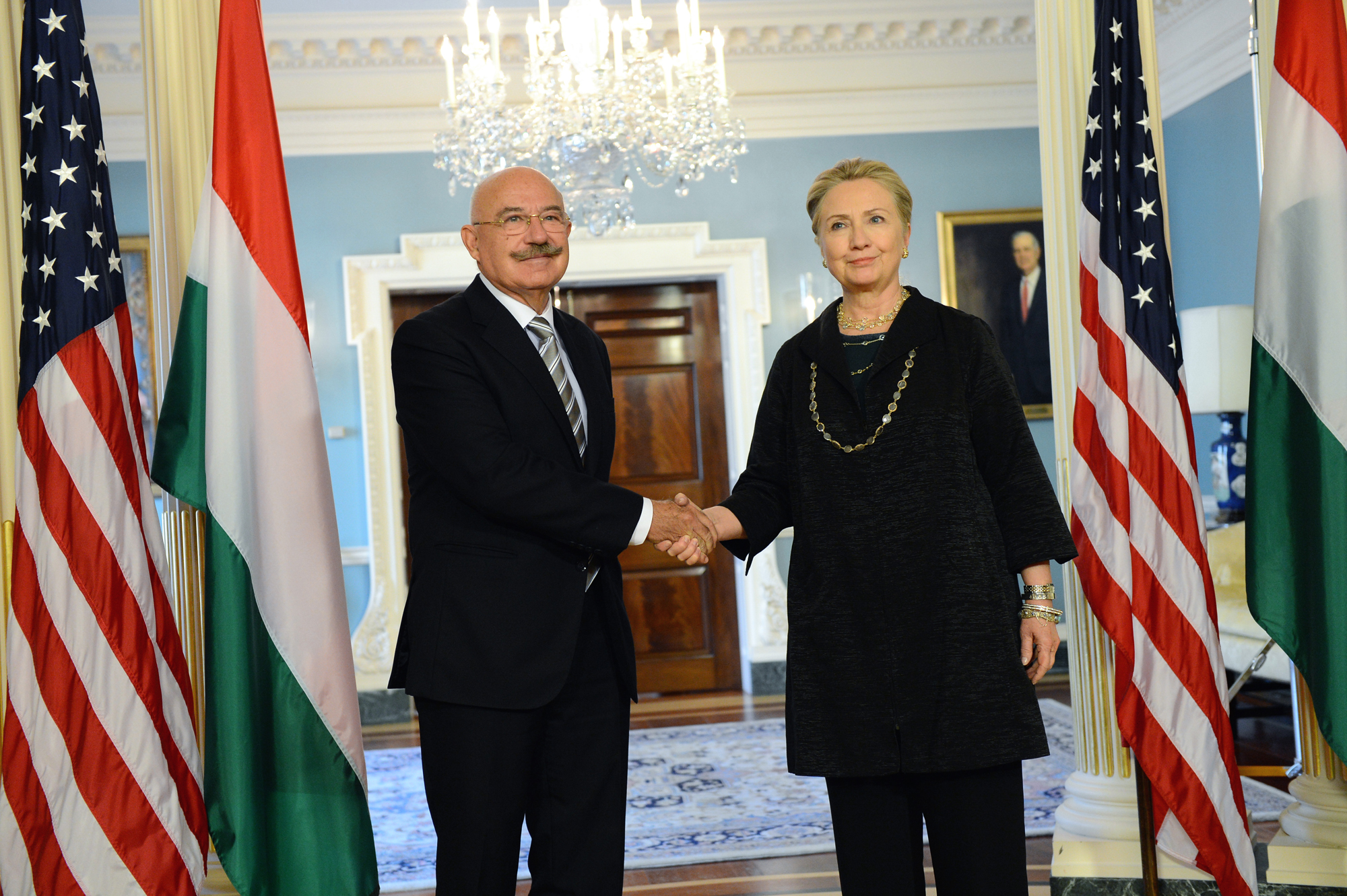

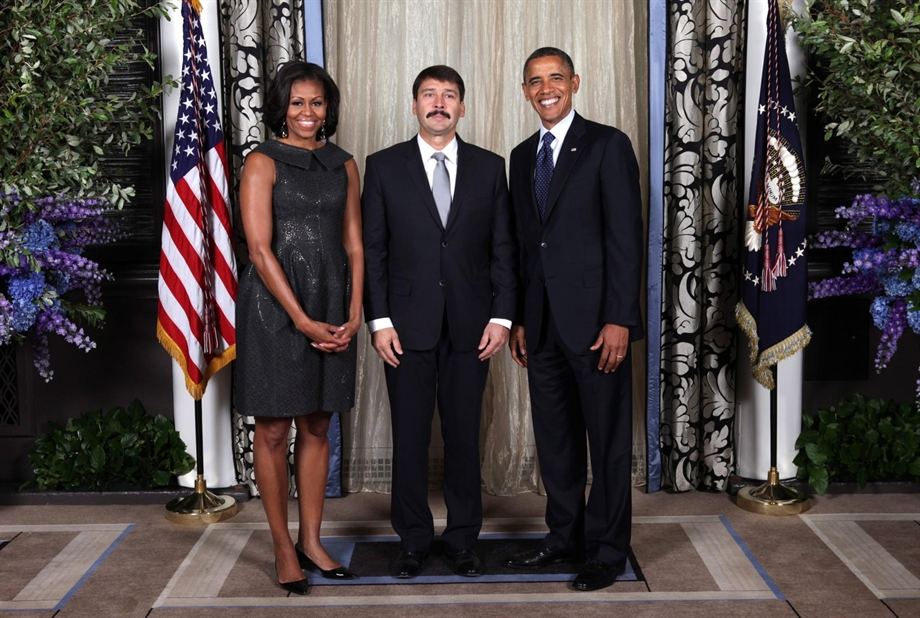

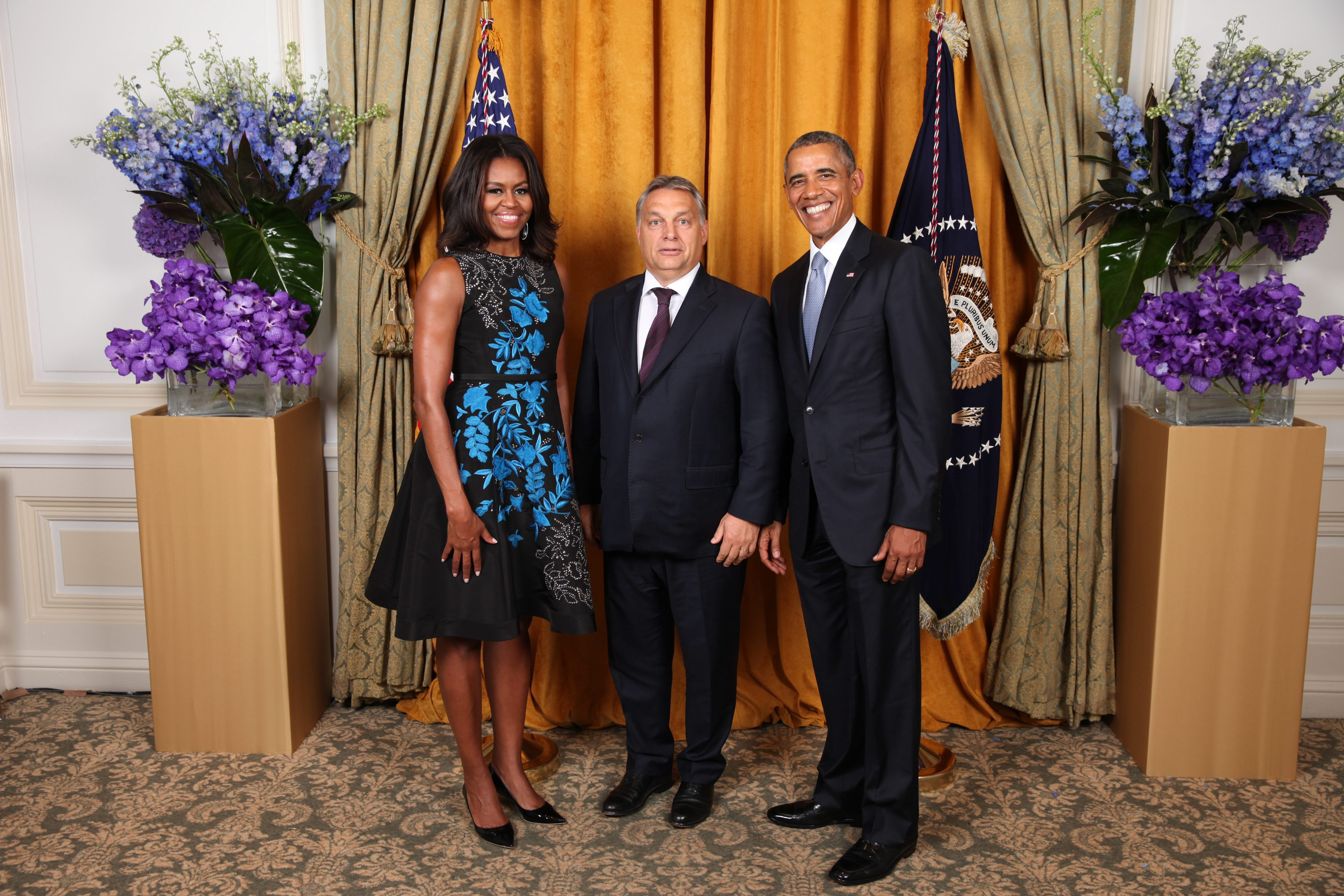

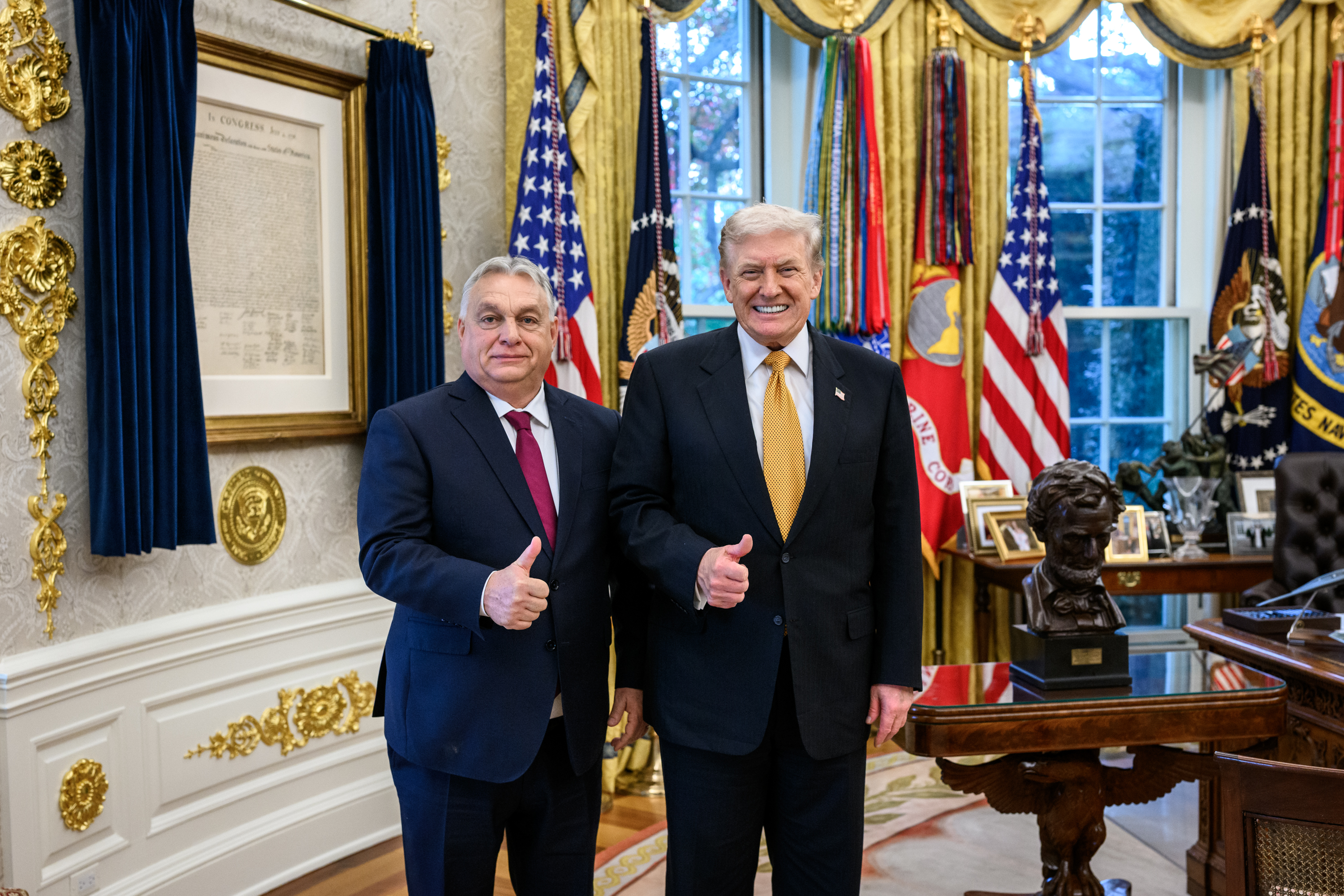

== Iceland ==
Table of Trips
| Start | End | Guest | Title | Reason |
|---|---|---|---|---|
| August 24, 1944 | August 27, 1944 | Sveinn Björnsson | President | Guest of U.S. Government. In U.S. August 19–29. Visited New York City. |
| August 18, 1964 | August 18, 1964 | Bjarni Benediktsson | Prime Minister | Informal visit. |
| July 17, 1967 | July 19, 1967 | Ásgeir Ásgeirsson | President | Informal visit. In U.S. July 17 – August 5; visited New York City and Boston. Travelled to Canada July 28 – August 2. |
| April 10, 1969 | April 11, 1969 | Bjarni Benediktsson | Prime Minister | Met with President Nixon April 11 after NATO Ministerial Meeting. |
| May 30, 1978 | May 31, 1978 | Geir Hallgrímsson | Prime Minister | Attended NATO Summit conference. |
| September 4, 1982 | September 10, 1982 | Vigdís Finnbogadóttir | President | Official working visit. Private visit afterwards to Minneapolis, New York City, Seattle, and Chicago. |
| January 26, 1988 | January 26, 1988 | Vigdís Finnbogadóttir | President | Met with President Reagan during a private visit. |
| August 9, 1988 | August 13, 1988 | Þorsteinn Pálsson | Prime Minister | Official Working Visit. Private visit to Orlando afterward. |
| May 23, 1989 | May 23, 1989 | Vigdís Finnbogadóttir | President | Met with President Bush during a private visit. |
| September 24, 1991 | September 24, 1991 | Davíð Oddsson | Prime Minister | Met with President Bush while attending the U.N. General Assembly in New York City. |
| October 8, 1991 | October 9, 1991 | Vigdís Finnbogadóttir | President | Attended symposium on explorations at the Smithsonian Institution, and commemoration of Viking explorers; met with President Bush Oct. 9. |
| October 5, 1994 | October 7, 1994 | Vigdís Finnbogadóttir | President | Met with President Clinton during a private visit. |
| April 23, 1999 | April 25, 1999 | Davíð Oddsson | Prime Minister | Attended NATO's 50th Anniversary Summit. |
| April 28, 2000 | April 28, 2000 | Ólafur Ragnar Grímsson | President | Private visit. |
| July 5, 2004 | July 7, 2004 | Davíð Oddsson | Prime Minister | Working visit. |
| May 20, 2012 | May 21, 2012 | Jóhanna Sigurðardóttir | Prime Minister | Attended the NATO Summit meeting in Chicago |
| May 13, 2016 | May 13, 2016 | Sigurður Ingi Jóhannsson | Prime Minister | Attended the U.S.-Nordic Leaders Summit. |
| July 10, 2024 | July 11, 2024 | Bjarni Benediktsson | Prime Minister | Attended NATO 75th Anniversary Summit in Washington, D.C. |

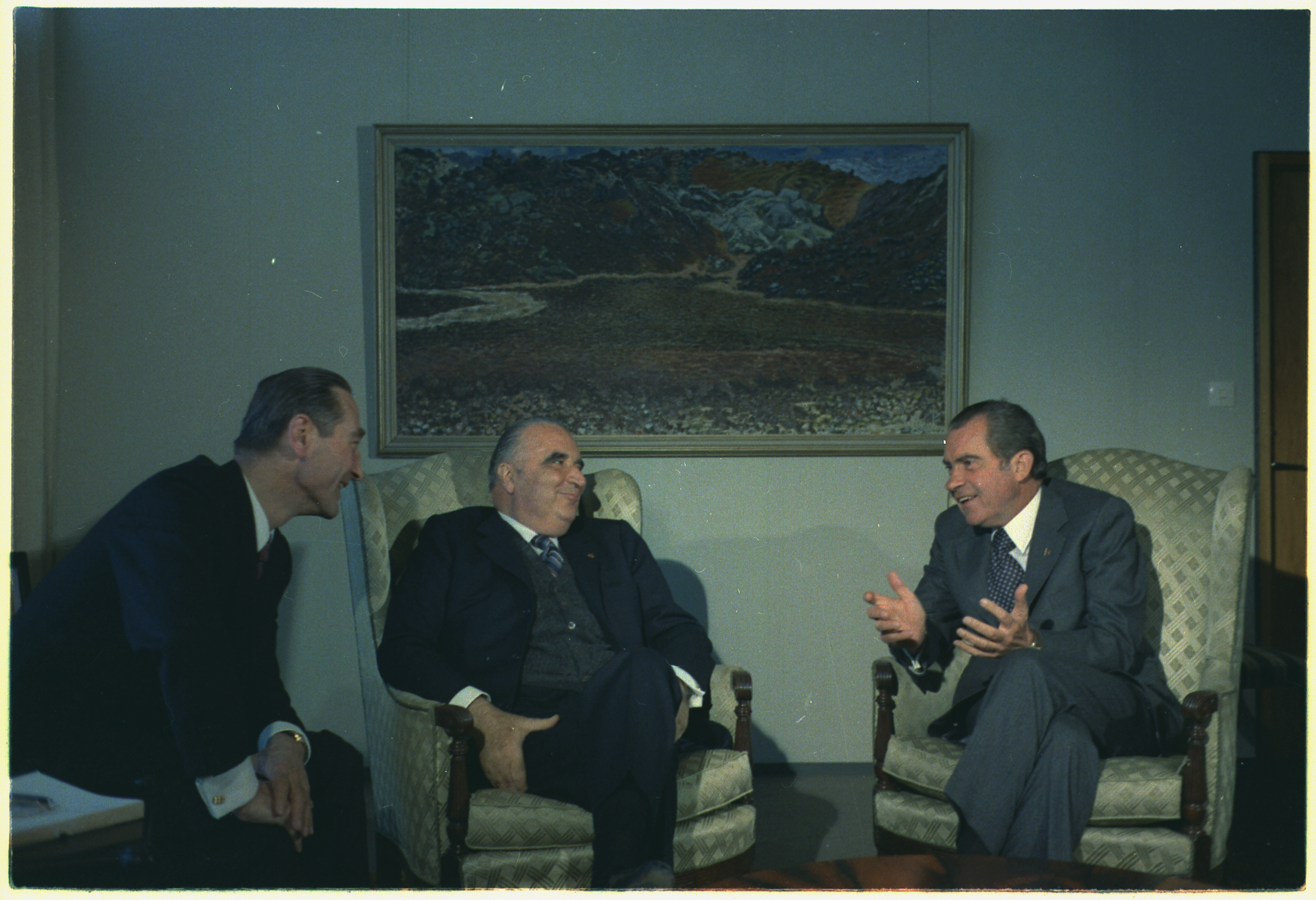

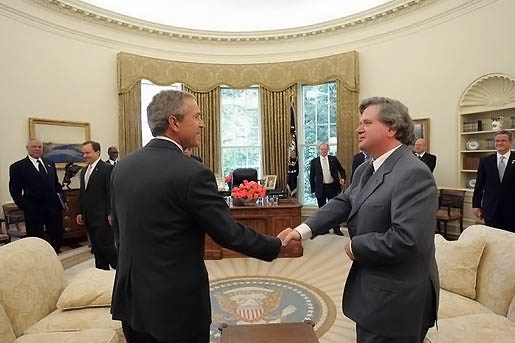

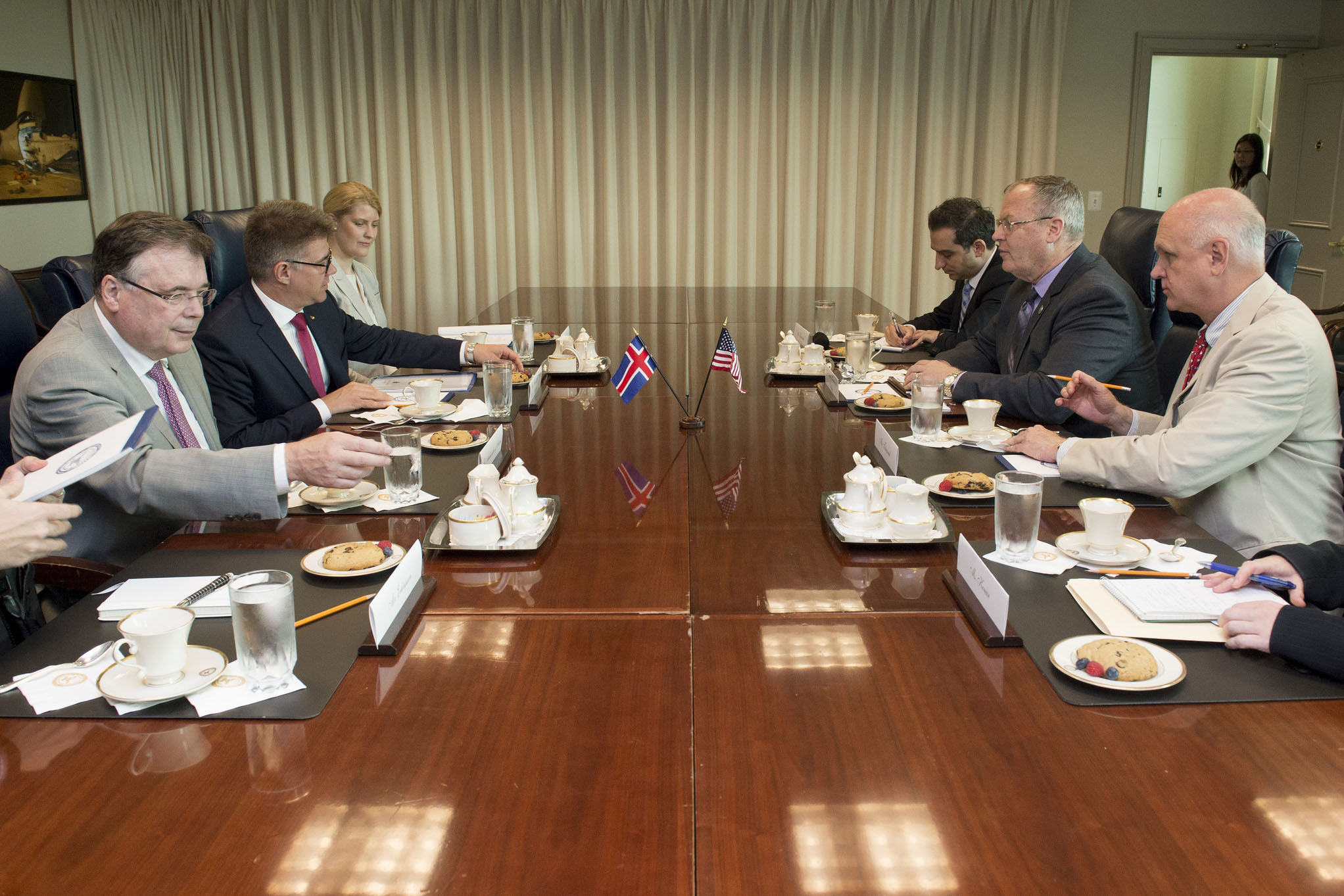

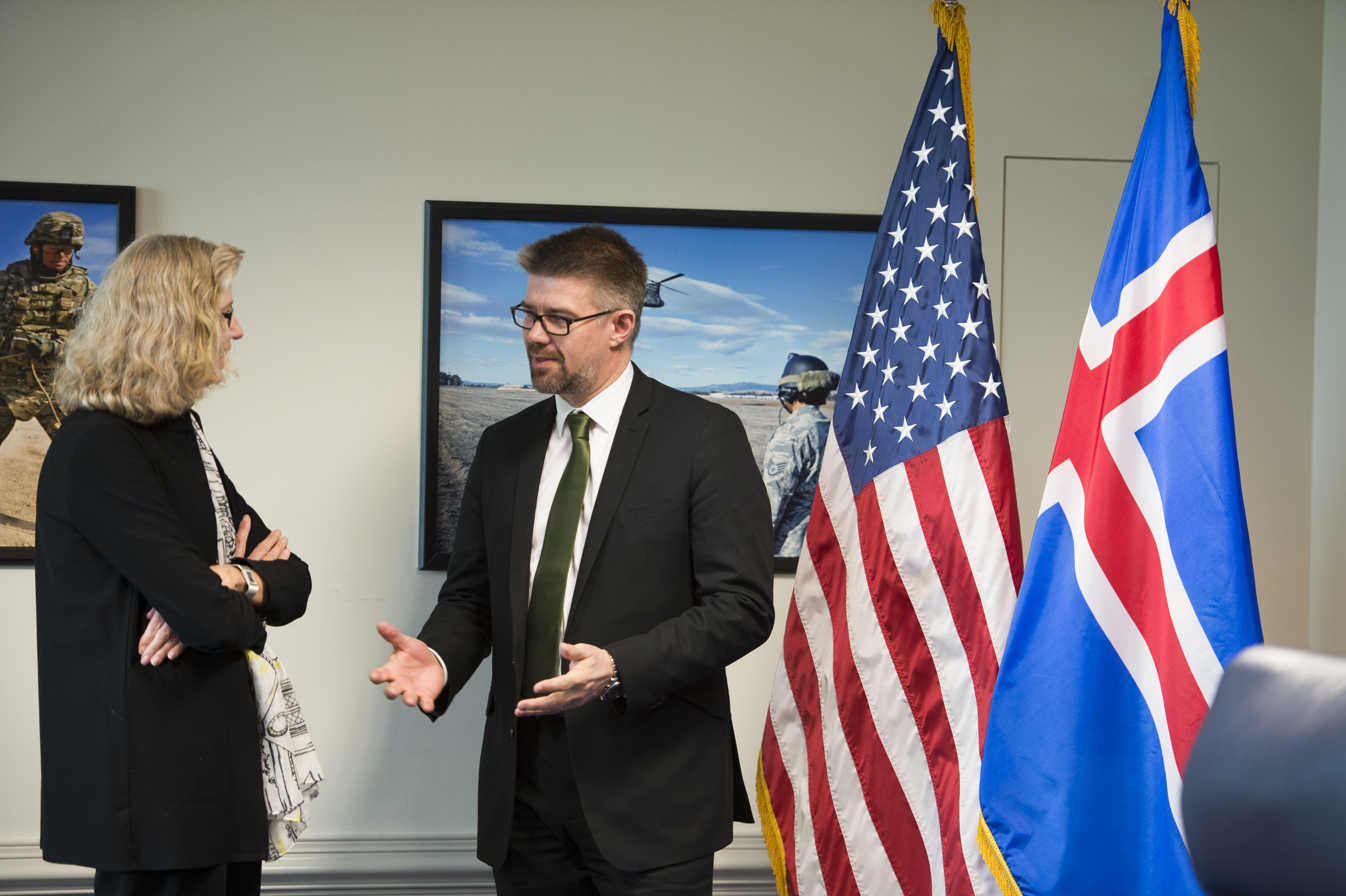

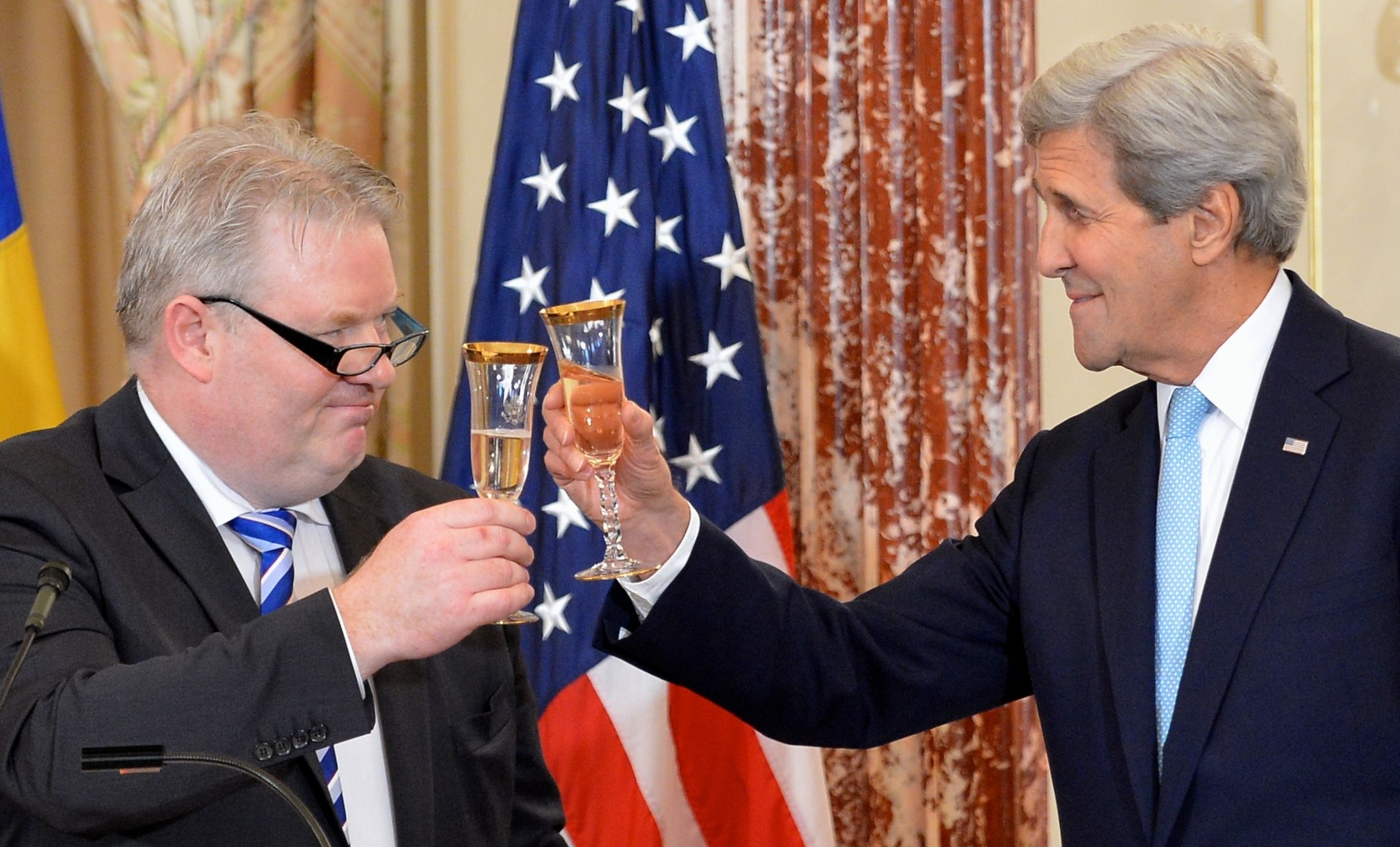

== Ireland (Republic of) ==
Since the 1980s, it is customary for the Taoiseach of the day to visit the White House on Saint Patrick's Day and present the President with a bowl of shamrock.

Table of Trips
| Start | End | Guest | Title | Reason |
|---|---|---|---|---|
| March 14, 1956 | March 17, 1956 | John A. Costello | Taoiseach | Afterwards visited New York City, Philadelphia and New Haven. Departed U.S. March 29. |
| March 17, 1959 | March 19, 1959 | Seán T. O'Kelly | President | At the invitation of the President. In the U.S. March 16–31. Also visited New York City, Providence, Boston, Chicago, Springfield and Peoria, St. Paul, and Philadelphia . |
| October 15, 1963 | October 17, 1963 | Seán Lemass | Taoiseach | Official visit. In U.S. October 11–20, visited Philadelphia, Chicago, New York City, and Boston. |
| November 24, 1963 | November 25, 1963 | Éamon de Valera | President | Attended funeral of President Kennedy. |
| May 27, 1964 | May 30, 1964 | Éamon de Valera | President | Official visit. Addressed U.S. Congress May 28. In U.S. May 26–30, visited Williamsburg (Virginia) and New York City. |
| October 24, 1970 | October 24, 1970 | Jack Lynch | Taoiseach | Attended White House dinner on 25th Anniversary of the U.N. |
| March 15, 1971 | March 17, 1971 | Jack Lynch | President | Private visit. |
| October 5, 1973 | October 5, 1973 | Jack Lynch | Taoiseach | Attended memorial services for former President Truman. |
| March 17, 1976 | March 19, 1976 | Liam Cosgrave | Taoiseach | Official visit; addressed a joint session of U.S. Congress March 17. In the U.S. March 16; visited Williamsburg, Philadelphia, Chicago, New York City, and Boston. |
| November 8, 1979 | November 10, 1979 | Jack Lynch | Taoiseach | Official visit. In U.S. November 7–15; visited Williamsburg, Boston, New Orleans, Houston, Chicago, and New York City. |
| March 16, 1982 | March 17, 1982 | Charles Haughey | Taoiseach | Official working visit. |
| March 14, 1984 | March 16, 1984 | Garret FitzGerald | Taoiseach | Official working visit. Addressed Joint Session of U.S. Congress March 15. |
| March 17, 1986 | March 17, 1986 | Garret FitzGerald | Taoiseach | Met with President Reagan |
| March 16, 1987 | March 17, 1987 | Charles Haughey | Taoiseach | Met with President Reagan |
| March 17, 1989 | March 17, 1989 | Charles Haughey | Taoiseach | Met with President Bush during a private visit. |
| February 26, 1990 | February 28, 1990 | Charles Haughey | Taoiseach | Official working visit. |
| March 16, 1993 | March 17, 1993 | Albert Reynolds | Taoiseach | Met with President Clinton during a private visit. |
| May 12, 1993 | May 15, 1993 | Mary Robinson | President | Met with President Clinton during a private visit. |
| March 16, 1994 | March 18, 1994 | Albert Reynolds | Taoiseach | Official working visit. |
| March 16, 1995 | March 18, 1995 | John Bruton | Taoiseach | Working visit. Later visited New York City, Chicago, and St. Louis; departed March 24. |
| March 14, 1996 | March 16, 1996 | John Bruton | Taoiseach | Met with President Clinton during a private visit. |
| June 12, 1996 | June 15, 1996 | Mary Robinson | President | State Visit. |
| September 8, 1996 | September 12, 1996 | John Bruton | Taoiseach | Met with President Clinton during a private visit. Addressed joint session of Congressl. |
| December 15, 1996 | December 18, 1996 | John Bruton | Taoiseach | Working visit. Attended U.S.-European Union Summit meeting. |
| March 17, 1997 | March 18, 1997 | John Bruton | Taoiseach | Met with President Clinton during a private visit. |
| December 15, 1997 | December 15, 1997 | Bertie Ahern | Taoiseach | Working visit. |
| March 17, 1998 | March 17, 1998 | Bertie Ahern | Taoiseach | Met with President Clinton during a private visit. |
| June 22, 1998 | June 26, 1998 | Mary McAleese | President | Private visit; also discussed Northern Ireland Peace process with President Clinton and Northern Irish political leaders. |
| March 15, 1999 | March 18, 1999 | Bertie Ahern | Taoiseach | Met with President Clinton during a private visit; discussed the peace process with Northern Irish political leaders. |
| March 15, 2000 | March 18, 2000 | Bertie Ahern | Taoiseach | Met with President Clinton during a private visit; discussed the peace process with Northern Irish political leaders. |
| September 8, 2000 | September 8, 2000 | Bertie Ahern | Taoiseach | Met with President Clinton at the UN Millennium Summit in New York City. |
| March 14, 2001 | March 16, 2001 | Bertie Ahern | Taoiseach | Met with President Bush during a private visit. |
| November 8, 2001 | November 8, 2001 | Bertie Ahern | Taoiseach | Met with President Bush during a private visit. |
| March 12, 2002 | March 14, 2002 | Bertie Ahern | Taoiseach | Working visit. |
| March 13, 2003 | March 14, 2003 | Bertie Ahern | Taoiseach | Working visit. |
| March 16, 2004 | March 18, 2004 | Bertie Ahern | Taoiseach | Working visit. |
| June 11, 2004 | June 11, 2004 | Mary McAleese | President | Attended the funeral of Former President Reagan |
| March 16, 2005 | March 17, 2005 | Bertie Ahern | Taoiseach | Official Working Visit. |
| March 15, 2006 | March 17, 2006 | Bertie Ahern | Taoiseach | Official Working Visit. |
| March 14, 2007 | March 16, 2007 | Bertie Ahern | Taoiseach | Official Working Visit. |
| March 16, 2008 | March 18, 2008 | Bertie Ahern | Taoiseach | Official Working Visit. |
| April 29, 2008 | May 1, 2008 | Bertie Ahern | Taoiseach | Official Working Visit. |
| March 17, 2009 | March 17, 2009 | Brian Cowen | Taoiseach | Official Working Visit. |
| March 17, 2010 | March 18, 2010 | Brian Cowen | Taoiseach | Official Working Visit. |
| March 17, 2011 | March 17, 2011 | Enda Kenny | Taoiseach | Official Working Visit. |
| March 19, 2012 | March 21, 2012 | Enda Kenny | Taoiseach | Official Working Visit. |
| March 19, 2013 | March 20, 2013 | Enda Kenny | Taoiseach | Official Working Visit. |
| March 14, 2014 | March 14, 2014 | Enda Kenny | Taoiseach | Official Working Visit. |
| March 17, 2015 | March 17, 2015 | Enda Kenny | Taoiseach | Official Working Visit. |
| March 15, 2016 | March 17, 2016 | Enda Kenny | Taoiseach | Official Working Visit. |
| March 16, 2017 | March 17, 2017 | Enda Kenny | Taoiseach | Official Working Visit. |
| March 13, 2018 | March 16, 2018 | Leo Varadkar | Taoiseach | Official Working Visit. |
| March 12, 2019 | March 15, 2019 | Leo Varadkar | Taoiseach | Official Working Visit. |
| March 12, 2020 | March 12, 2020 | Leo Varadkar | Taoiseach | Official Working Visit. |
| March 17, 2022 | March 17, 2022 | Michael Martin | Taoiseach | Official Working Visit. |
| March 17, 2023 | March 17, 2023 | Leo Varadkar | Taoiseach | Official Working Visit. |
| March 15, 2024 | March 15, 2024 | Leo Varadkar | Taoiseach | Official Working Visit. |
| October 9, 2024 | October 9, 2024 | Simon Harris | Taoiseach | Official Visit. |

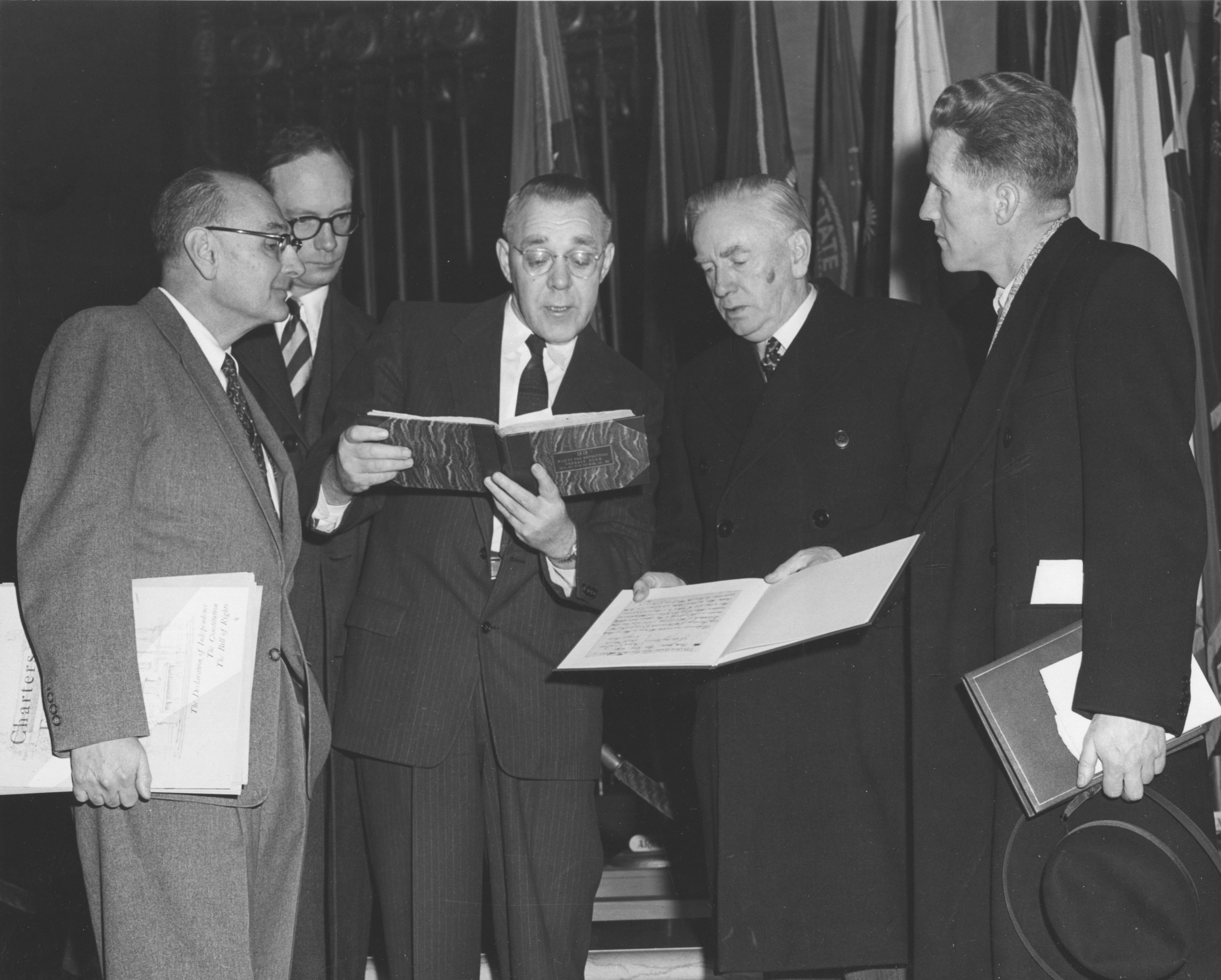

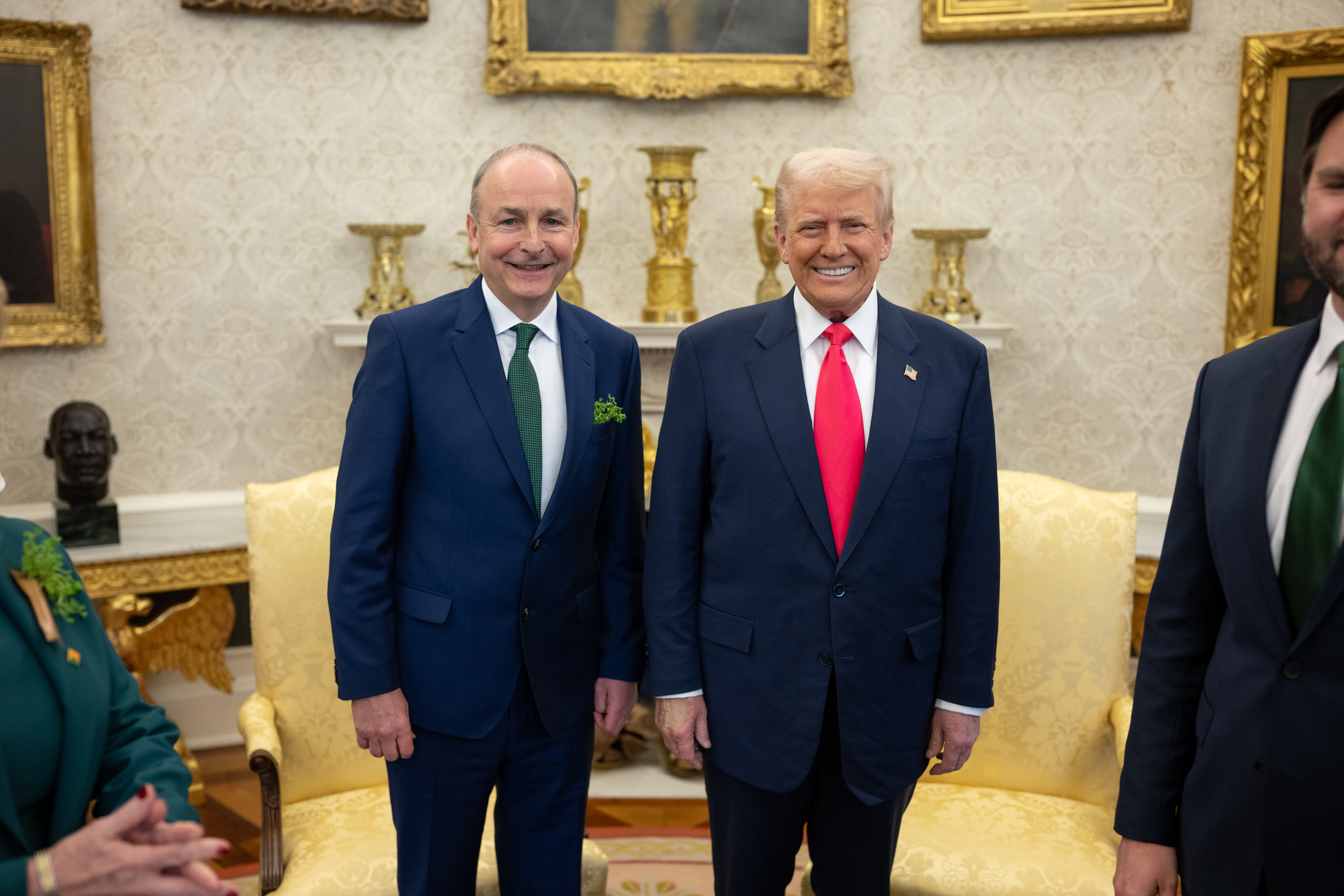

== Italy ==
Table of Trips
| Start | End | Guest | Title | Reason |
|---|---|---|---|---|
| January 5, 1947 | January 9, 1947 | Alcide De Gasperi | Prime Minister | Guest of U.S. Government. Discussed postwar economic assistance. Afterwards visited Chicago, Cleveland, and New York City. Returned to Washington, D.C. January 14; departed U.S. January 15. |
| September 24, 1951 | September 26, 1951 | Alcide De Gasperi | Prime Minister | At invitation of the U.S. Government. Met with President Truman after a NATO meeting in Ottawa, Ontario, Canada. Addressed U.S. Congress September 24. |
| March 7, 1955 | March 27, 1955 | Mario Scelba | Prime Minister | Official visit. Also visited New York City. Unofficial visits to Philadelphia, Chicago, and Detroit. Departed U.S. April 7. |
| February 27, 1956 | March 2, 1956 | Giovanni Gronchi | President | State visit. Addressed U.S. Congress February 29. Afterwards visited Norfolk, Detroit, San Francisco, and New York City. Visited Canada March 3–5. Departed U.S. March 14. |
| July 28, 1958 | July 28, 1958 | Amintore Fanfani | Prime Minister | Informal visit to Washington, D.C. |
| September 30, 1959 | October 3, 1959 | Antonio Segni | Prime Minister | Official visit. Afterwards visited New York City. Departed U.S. October 4. |
| June 11, 1961 | June 13, 1961 | Amintore Fanfani | Prime Minister | Informal visit. Left U.S. June 16, after visiting Baltimore, Philadelphia, and New York City. |
| January 15, 1963 | January 18, 1963 | Amintore Fanfani | Prime Minister | Official visit. Afterwards visited Chicago. Departed U.S. January 19. |
| January 14, 1964 | January 16, 1964 | Antonio Segni | President | Official visit. In U.S. January 13–18, visited Philadelphia, Norfolk, and New York City. |
| April 19, 1965 | April 22, 1965 | Aldo Moro | Prime Minister | Official visit. In U.S. April 19–23. Visited New York City. |
| June 22, 1967 | June 22, 1967 | Aldo Moro | Prime Minister | Informal visit. Discussed the Middle East crisis with President Johnson. |
| September 18, 1967 | September 20, 1967 | Giuseppe Saragat | President | Official visit. Afterwards visited Los Angeles. Departed U.S. September 21. |
| March 31, 1969 | April 1, 1969 | Mariano Rumor | Prime Minister | Attended funeral of former President Eisenhower; met with President Nixon April 1. |
| February 17, 1971 | February 20, 1971 | Mariano Rumor | Prime Minister | Official visit. Afterwards visited Houston, Boston, and New York City. Departed U.S. February 22. |
| April 17, 1973 | April 18, 1973 | Mariano Rumor | Prime Minister | Official visit. In U.S. April 16–22; visited Williamsburg, New York City, and Hawaii. |
| September 25, 1974 | September 27, 1974 | Giovanni Leone | President | State visit. In U.S. September 24–29; visited Williamsburg and New York City. |
| June 26, 1976 | June 28, 1976 | Aldo Moro | Prime Minister | Attended G-7 Economic Summit Meeting in Dorado, Puerto Rico |
| December 6, 1976 | December 7, 1976 | Giulio Andreotti | Prime Minister | Official visit. |
| July 25, 1977 | July 28, 1977 | Giulio Andreotti | Prime Minister | Official visit. |
| May 30, 1978 | May 31, 1978 | Giulio Andreotti | Prime Minister | Attended NATO Summit conference. |
| January 24, 1980 | January 25, 1980 | Giulio Andreotti | Prime Minister | Official visit. |
| March 24, 1982 | March 27, 1982 | Alessandro Pertini | President | State visit; visited San Francisco, Chicago, and New York City. Departed U.S. April 1. |
| November 2, 1982 | November 4, 1982 | Giovanni Spadolini | Prime Minister | Official working visit. Private visit afterwards to New York City, San Francisco, and Los Angeles. |
| May 25, 1983 | May 28, 1983 | Amintore Fanfani | Prime Minister | Official working visit. |
| May 28, 1983 | May 31, 1983 | Amintore Fanfani | Prime Minister | Attended G-7 Economic Summit meeting, Williamsburg |
| October 19, 1983 | October 21, 1983 | Bettino Craxi | Prime Minister | Official working visit. Private visit to New York City afterward. |
| March 4, 1985 | March 7, 1985 | Bettino Craxi | Prime Minister | Official Working Visit. Addressed Joint Meeting of U.S. Congress March 6. Private visit to Boston afterward. |
| October 24, 1985 | October 24, 1985 | Bettino Craxi | Prime Minister | Met with President Reagan in New York City. |
| May 26, 1987 | May 27, 1987 | Amintore Fanfani | Prime Minister | Private Visit. Met with President Reagan May 27. Discussions of forthcoming G-7 Economic Summit. |
| December 15, 1987 | December 18, 1987 | Giovanni Goria | Prime Minister | Official Working Visit. Private visit to New York City afterwards. |
| June 13, 1988 | June 16, 1988 | Ciriaco De Mita | Prime Minister | Official Working Visit. Private Visit to Bar Harbor afterward. |
| December 14, 1988 | December 16, 1988 | Ciriaco De Mita | Prime Minister | Met with President Reagan during a private visit. Previously visited Los Angeles. |
| October 10, 1989 | October 15, 1989 | Francesco Cossiga | President | State visit; visited New York City and New Haven. Departed U.S. October 17. |
| March 5, 1990 | March 8, 1990 | Giulio Andreotti | Prime Minister | Official visit. Addressed Joint Meeting of Congress March 7. Private visit to New York City afterwards. |
| July 8, 1990 | July 11, 1990 | Giulio Andreotti | Prime Minister | Attended G-7 Economic Summit Meeting in Houston. |
| October 1, 1990 | October 1, 1990 | Giulio Andreotti | Prime Minister | Met with President Bush at the U.N. General Assembly. |
| November 13, 1990 | November 13, 1990 | Giulio Andreotti | Prime Minister | Official working visit. |
| May 7, 1991 | May 7, 1991 | Francesco Cossiga | President | |
| March 7, 1991 | March 7, 1991 | Giulio Andreotti | Prime Minister | |
| April 7, 1992 | April 7, 1992 | Francesco Cossiga | President | Met with President Bush during a private visit. |
| September 16, 1993 | September 17, 1993 | Carlo Azeglio Ciampi | Prime Minister | Met with President Clinton during a private visit. |
| February 2, 1995 | February 3, 1995 | Lamberto Dini | Prime Minister | Met with President Clinton en route to a G-7 conference in Canada. |
| April 1, 1996 | April 3, 1996 | Oscar Luigi Scalfaro | President | State Visit. Afterwards addressed the UN General Assembly. |
| June 12, 1996 | June 12, 1996 | Romano Prodi | Prime Minister | Attended U.S.-European Union Summit meeting. |
| June 20, 1997 | June 22, 1997 | Romano Prodi | Prime Minister | Attended the G-8 Economic Summit meeting in Denver. |
| May 5, 1998 | May 7, 1998 | Romano Prodi | Prime Minister | Official visit. |
| September 22, 1998 | September 22, 1998 | Romano Prodi | Prime Minister | Attended a forum on "Strengthening Democracy in the Global Economy" at New York University. |
| March 4, 1999 | March 5, 1999 | Massimo D'Alema | Prime Minister | Official working visit; arrived in Boston March 3. |
| April 23, 1999 | April 25, 1999 | Massimo D'Alema | Prime Minister | Attended NATO's 50th Anniversary Summit. |
| October 27, 1999 | October 27, 1999 | Romano Prodi | Prime Minister | Met with President Clinton as President of the European Commission. |
| September 19, 2000 | September 20, 2000 | Giuliano Amato | Prime Minister | Official working visit. |
| October 14, 2001 | October 15, 2001 | Silvio Berlusconi | Prime Minister | Working visit. |
| September 14, 2002 | September 14, 2002 | Silvio Berlusconi | Prime Minister | Met with President Bush at Camp David. |
| January 30, 2003 | January 30, 2003 | Silvio Berlusconi | Prime Minister | Met with President Bush during a private visit. |
| July 20, 2003 | July 21, 2003 | Silvio Berlusconi | Prime Minister | Official select visit at Crawford Ranch. |
| November 12, 2003 | November 16, 2003 | Carlo Azeglio Ciampi | President | Working visit. |
| May 18, 2004 | May 19, 2004 | Silvio Berlusconi | Prime Minister | Working visit. |
| June 8, 2004 | June 10, 2004 | Silvio Berlusconi | Prime Minister | Attended G-8 Economic Summit at Sea Island. Attended the funeral of Former President Reagan. |
| December 15, 2004 | December 15, 2004 | Silvio Berlusconi | Prime Minister | Working visit. |
| October 31, 2005 | October 31, 2005 | Silvio Berlusconi | Prime Minister | Working visit. |
| February 28, 2006 | March 1, 2006 | Silvio Berlusconi | Prime Minister | Working visit. Addressed a joint session of Congress March 1. |
| December 10, 2007 | December 12, 2007 | Giorgio Napolitano | President | Working visit. |
| October 12, 2008 | October 13, 2008 | Silvio Berlusconi | Prime Minister | Official visit. |
| November 14, 2008 | November 15, 2008 | Silvio Berlusconi | Prime Minister | Attended the G-20 Economic Summit meeting. |
| June 15, 2009 | June 15, 2009 | Silvio Berlusconi | Prime Minister | Working Visit. |
| September 24, 2009 | September 25, 2009 | Silvio Berlusconi | Prime Minister | Attended the G-20 Economic Summit in Pittsburgh. |
| April 12, 2010 | April 12, 2010 | Silvio Berlusconi | Prime Minister | Attended the Nuclear Security Summit. |
| May 25, 2010 | May 25, 2010 | Giorgio Napolitano | President | Working visit. |
| February 9, 2012 | February 9, 2012 | Mario Monti | Prime Minister | Working visit. |
| May 18, 2012 | May 19, 2012 | Mario Monti | Prime Minister | Attended the G-8 Economic Summit at Camp David |
| May 20, 2012 | May 21, 2012 | Mario Monti | Prime Minister | Attended the NATO Summit meeting in Chicago |
| October 16, 2013 | October 17, 2013 | Enrico Letta | Prime Minister | Working visit. |
| April 17, 2015 | April 17, 2015 | Matteo Renzi | Prime Minister | Official working visit. |
| February 8, 2016 | February 8, 2016 | Sergio Mattarella | President | Official working visit. |
| March 31, 2016 | April 1, 2016 | Matteo Renzi | Prime Minister | Attended the Nuclear Security Summit. |
| October 18, 2016 | October 18, 2016 | Matteo Renzi | Prime Minister | State Dinner. |
| April 20, 2017 | April 20, 2017 | Paolo Gentiloni | Prime Minister | Official Working Visit. |
| July 29, 2018 | July 30, 2018 | Giuseppe Conte | Prime Minister | Official Working Visit. |
| October 15, 2019 | October 17, 2019 | Sergio Mattarella | President | Official Working Visit. |
| May 10, 2022 | May 10, 2022 | Mario Draghi | Prime Minister | Working Visit. |
| July 27, 2023 | July 27, 2023 | Giorgia Meloni | Prime Minister | Working Visit. |
| March 1, 2024 | March 1, 2024 | Giorgia Meloni | Prime Minister | Working Visit. |
| July 10, 2024 | July 11, 2024 | Giorgia Meloni | Prime Minister | Attended NATO 75th Anniversary Summit in Washington, D.C. |
| April 17, 2025 | April 17, 2025 | Giorgia Meloni | Prime Minister | Working Visit. |

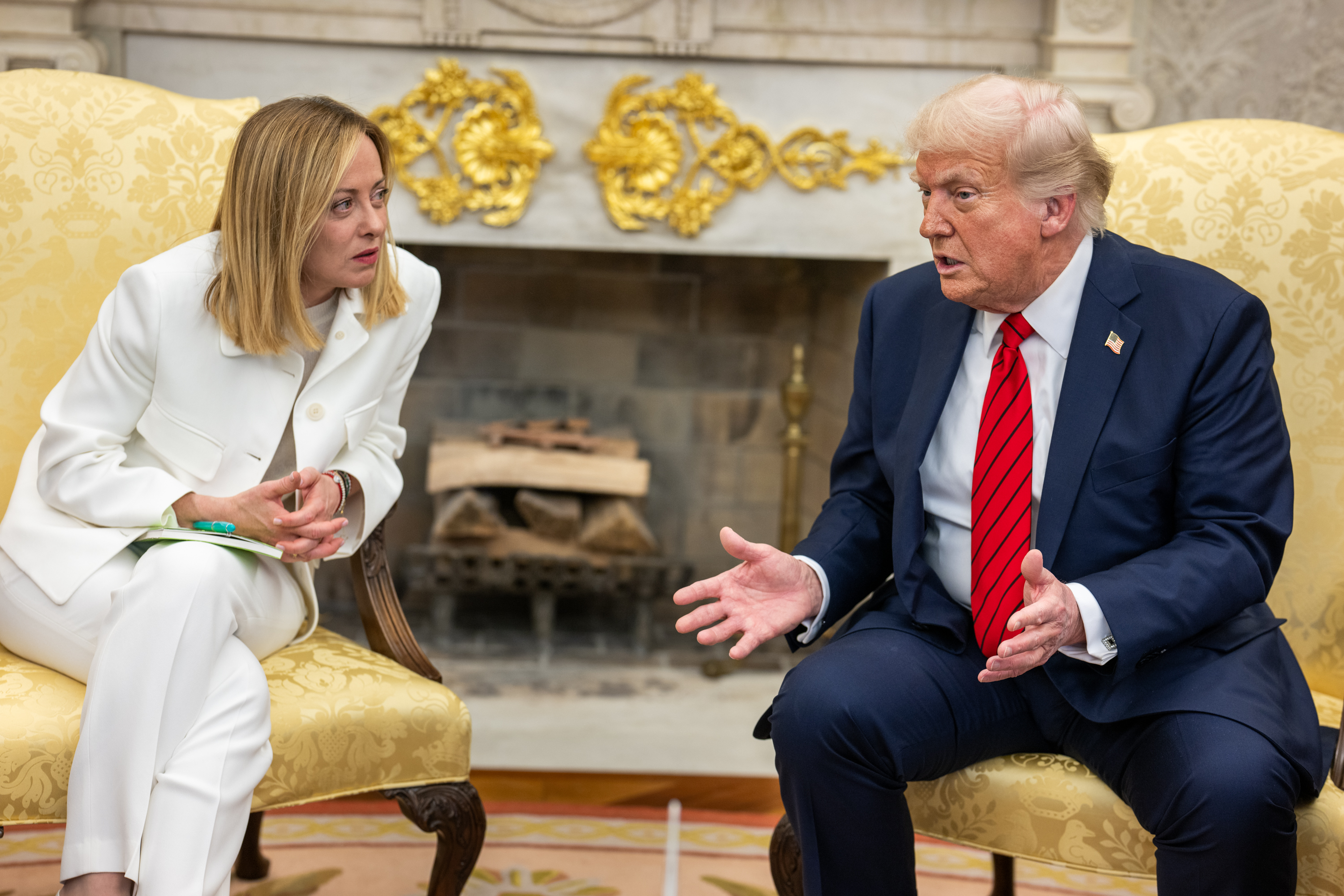

== Kosovo ==
Table of Trips
| Start | End | Guest | Title | Reason |
|---|---|---|---|---|
| July 17, 2008 | July 21, 2008 | Fatmir Sejdiu | President | Working visit. |
| July 17, 2008 | July 21, 2008 | Hashim Thaçi | Prime Minister | Working visit. |
| September 4, 2020 | September 4, 2020 | Avdullah Hoti | Prime Minister | Working visit. |
| April 27, 2022 | April 27, 2022 | Vjosa Osmani | President | Attended the Madeleine Albright Memorial Service |

== Latvia ==
Table of Trips
| Start | End | Guest | Title | Reason |
|---|---|---|---|---|
| September 27, 1993 | September 27, 1993 | Guntis Ulmanis | President | Met with President Clinton at the U.N. General Assembly in New York City. |
| May 24, 1994 | May 24, 1994 | Guntis Ulmanis | President | Met with President Clinton during a private visit; opened Latvian Mission to the United Nations in New York City. |
| June 25, 1996 | June 27, 1996 | Guntis Ulmanis | President | Working visit. Afterwards visited New York City. |
| January 14, 1998 | January 18, 1998 | Guntis Ulmanis | President | Working visit. Signed U.S.-Baltic Charter of Partnership. |
| April 23, 1999 | April 25, 1999 | Guntis Ulmanis | President | Attended NATO's 50th Anniversary Summit. Arrived April 22. |
| February 4, 2002 | February 6, 2002 | Vaira Vīķe-Freiberga | President | Working visit. |
| February 15, 2003 | February 19, 2003 | Vaira Vīķe-Freiberga | President | Working visit. |
| March 27, 2004 | March 30, 2004 | Indulis Emsis | Prime Minister | Working visit. Attended NATO Accession ceremony. |
| May 20, 2012 | May 21, 2012 | Andris Bērziņš | President | Attended the NATO Summit Meeting in Chicago |
| August 30, 2013 | August 30, 2013 | Andris Bērziņš | President | Working visit. |
| April 3, 2018 | April 3, 2018 | Raimonds Vejonis | President | U.S.-Baltic Leaders Summit. |
| July 10, 2024 | July 11, 2024 | Edgars Rinkēvičs | President | Attended NATO 75th Anniversary Summit in Washington, D.C. |

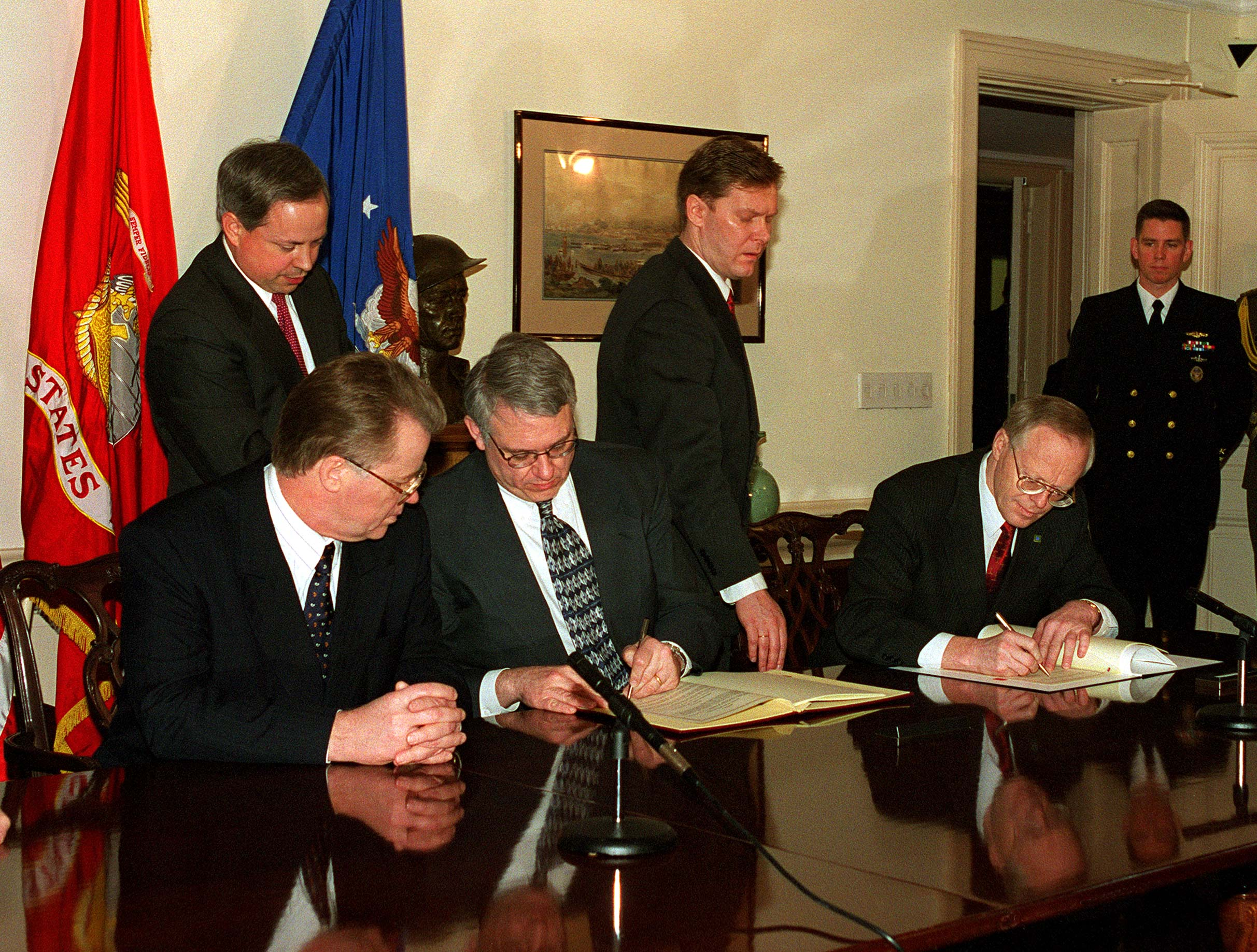

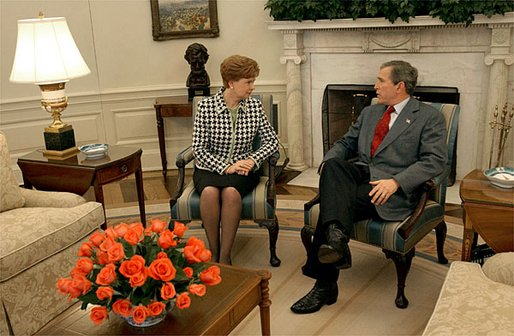

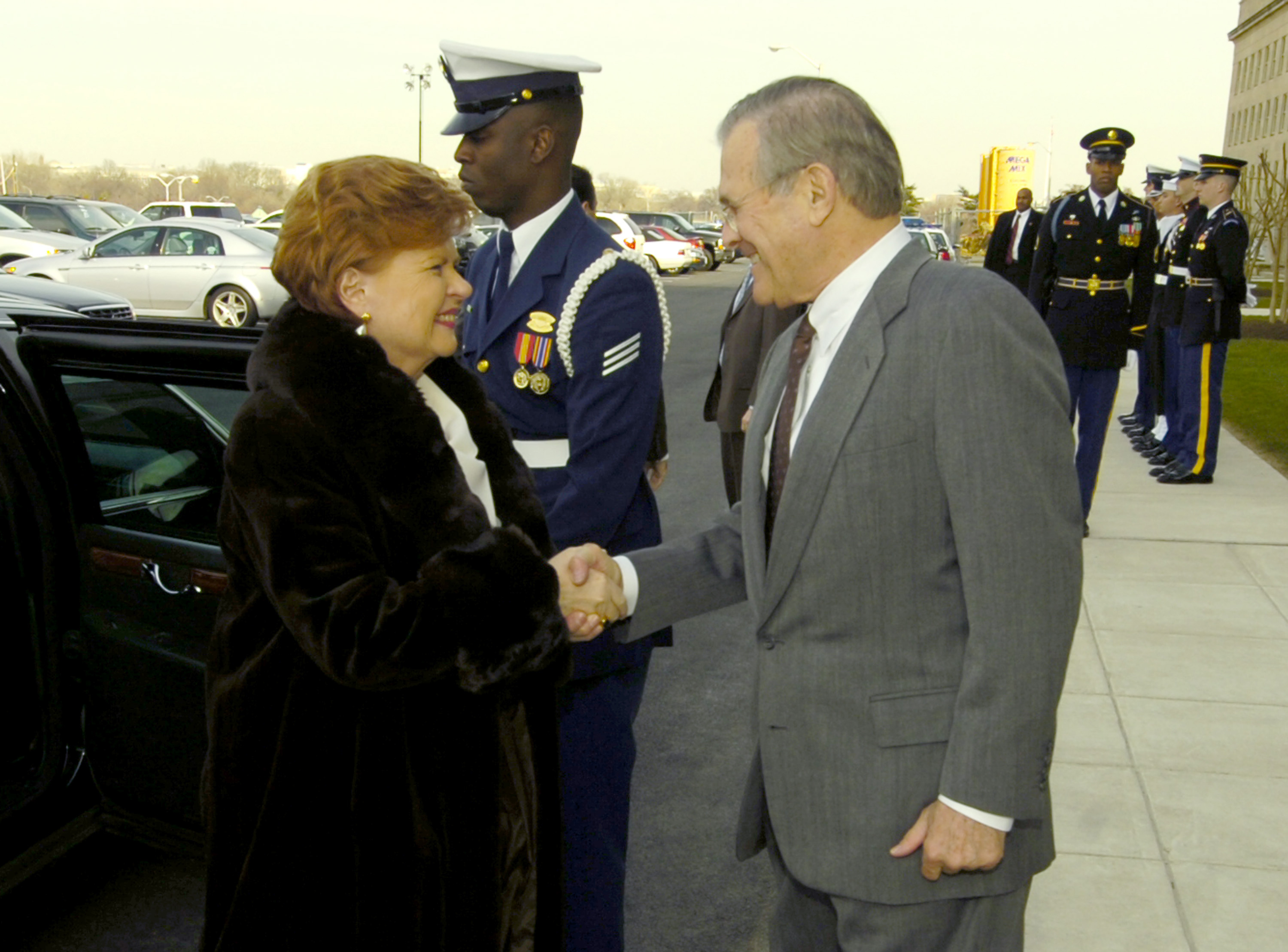

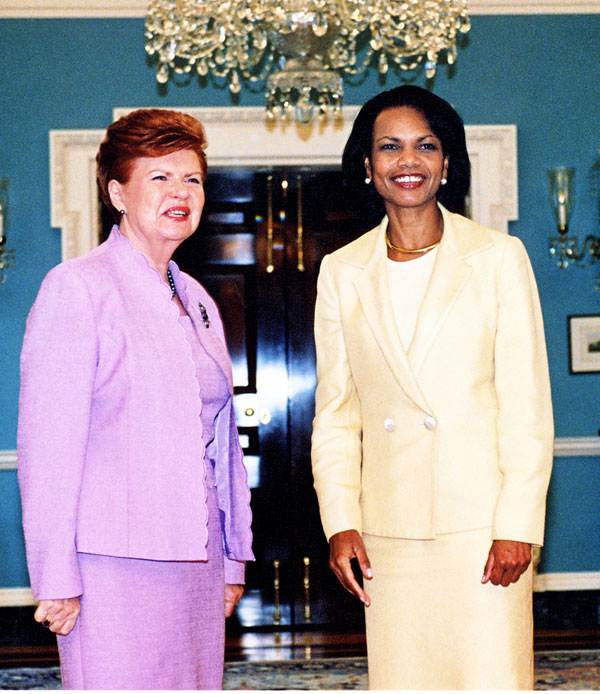

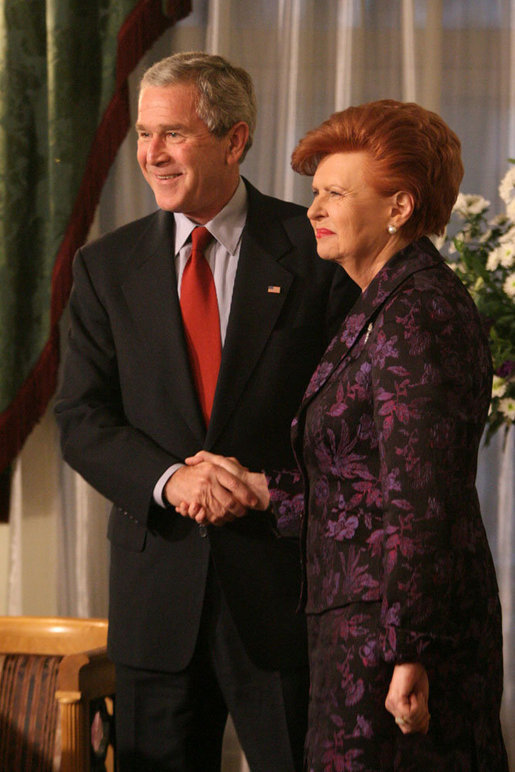

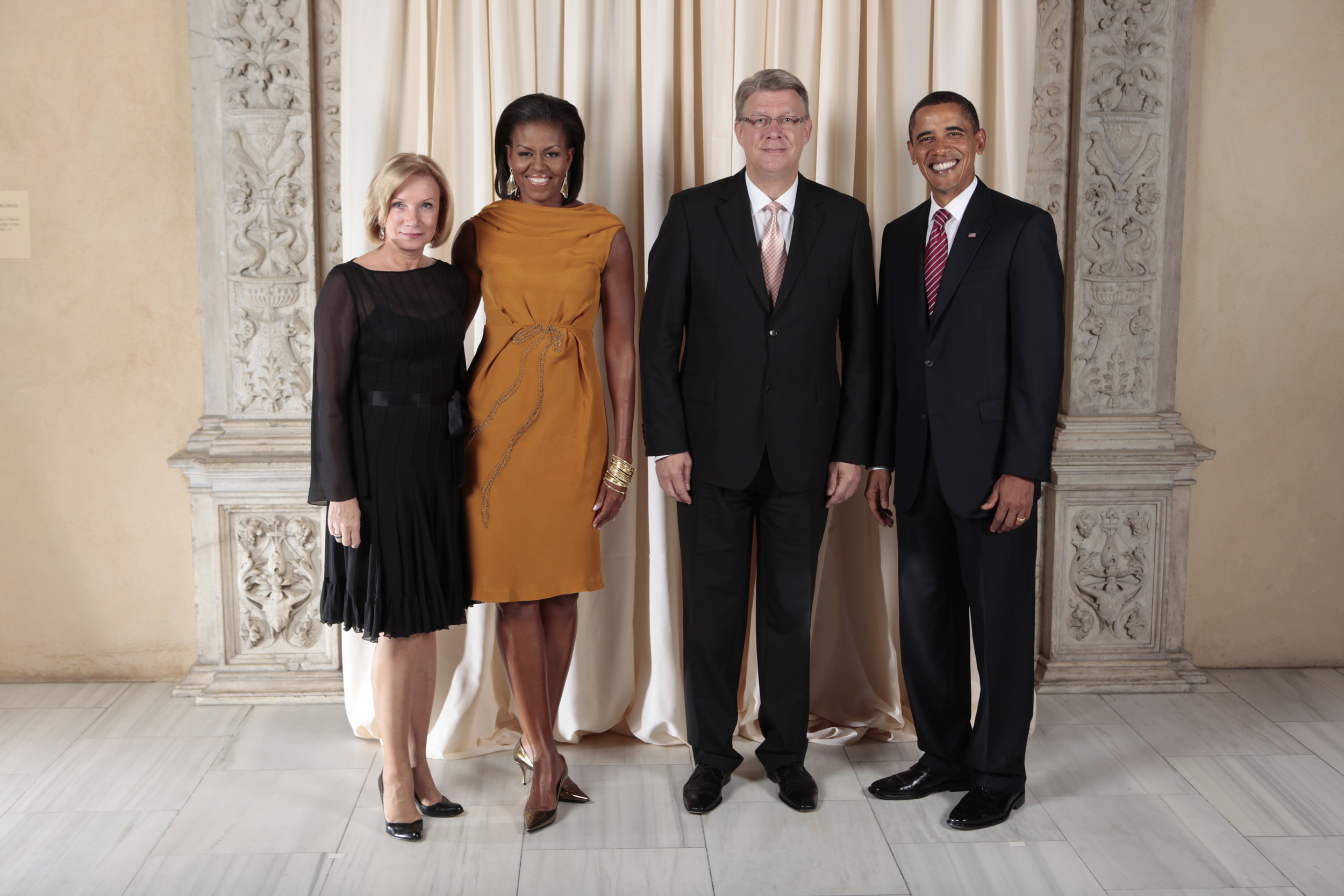

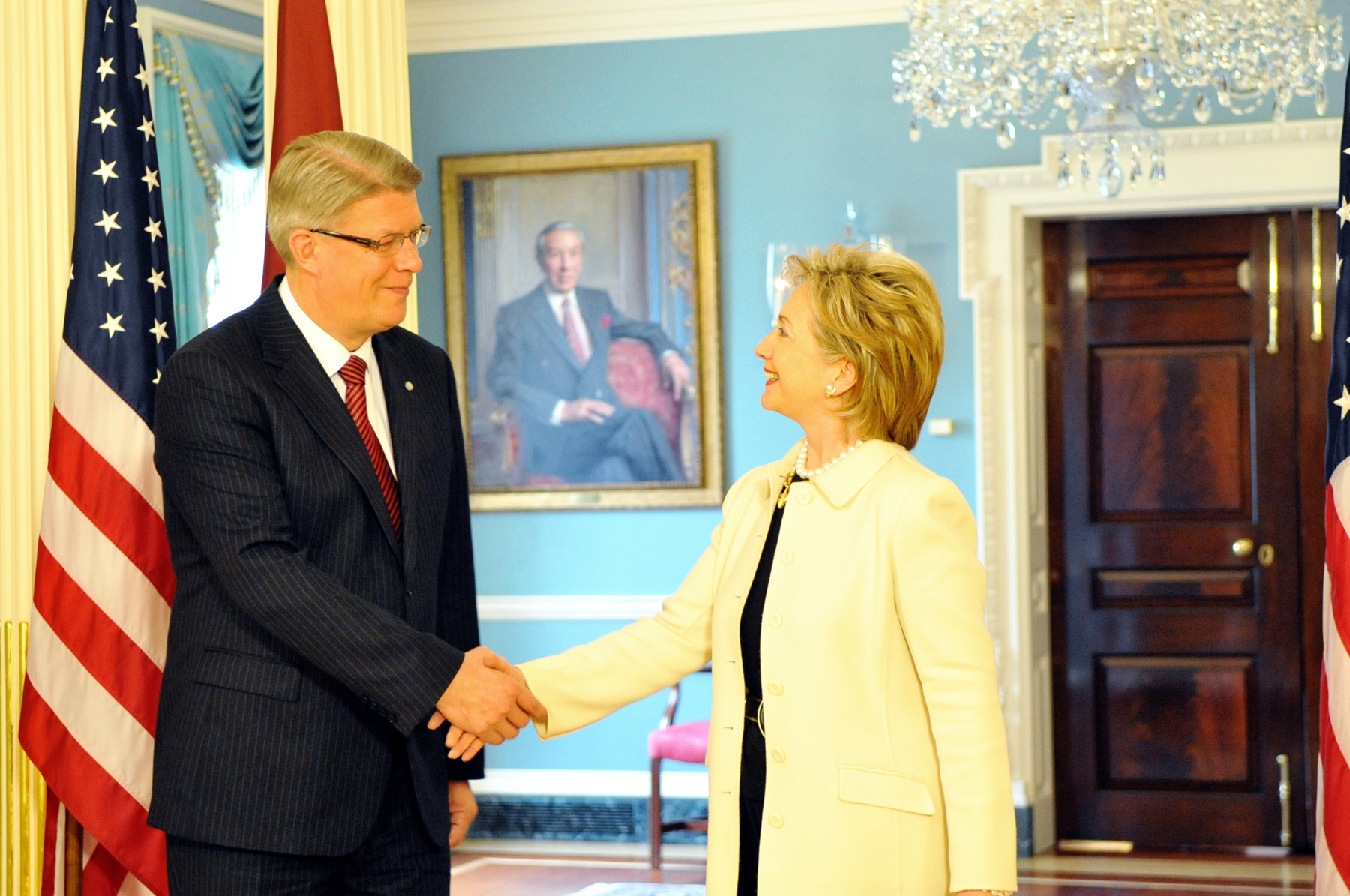

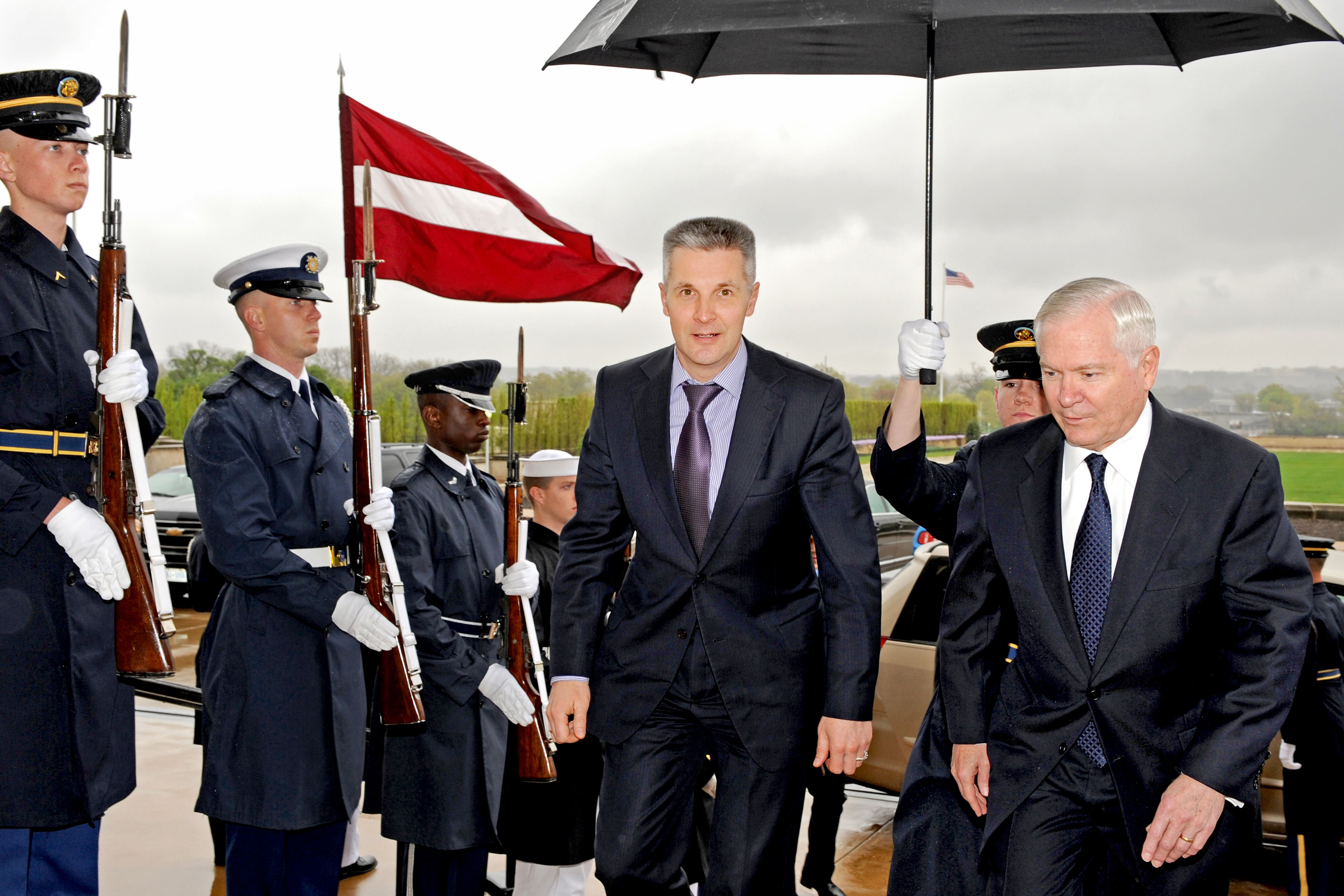

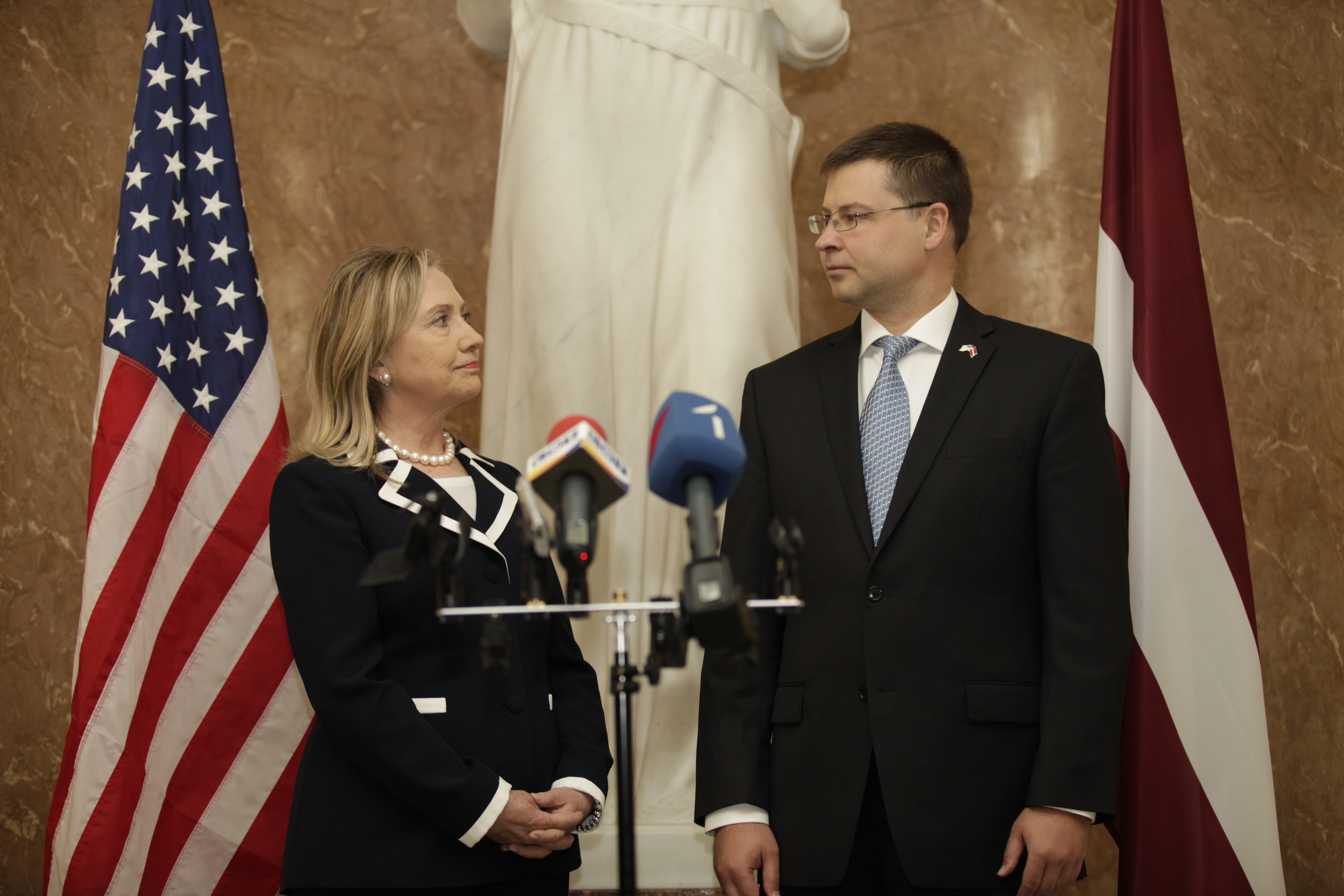

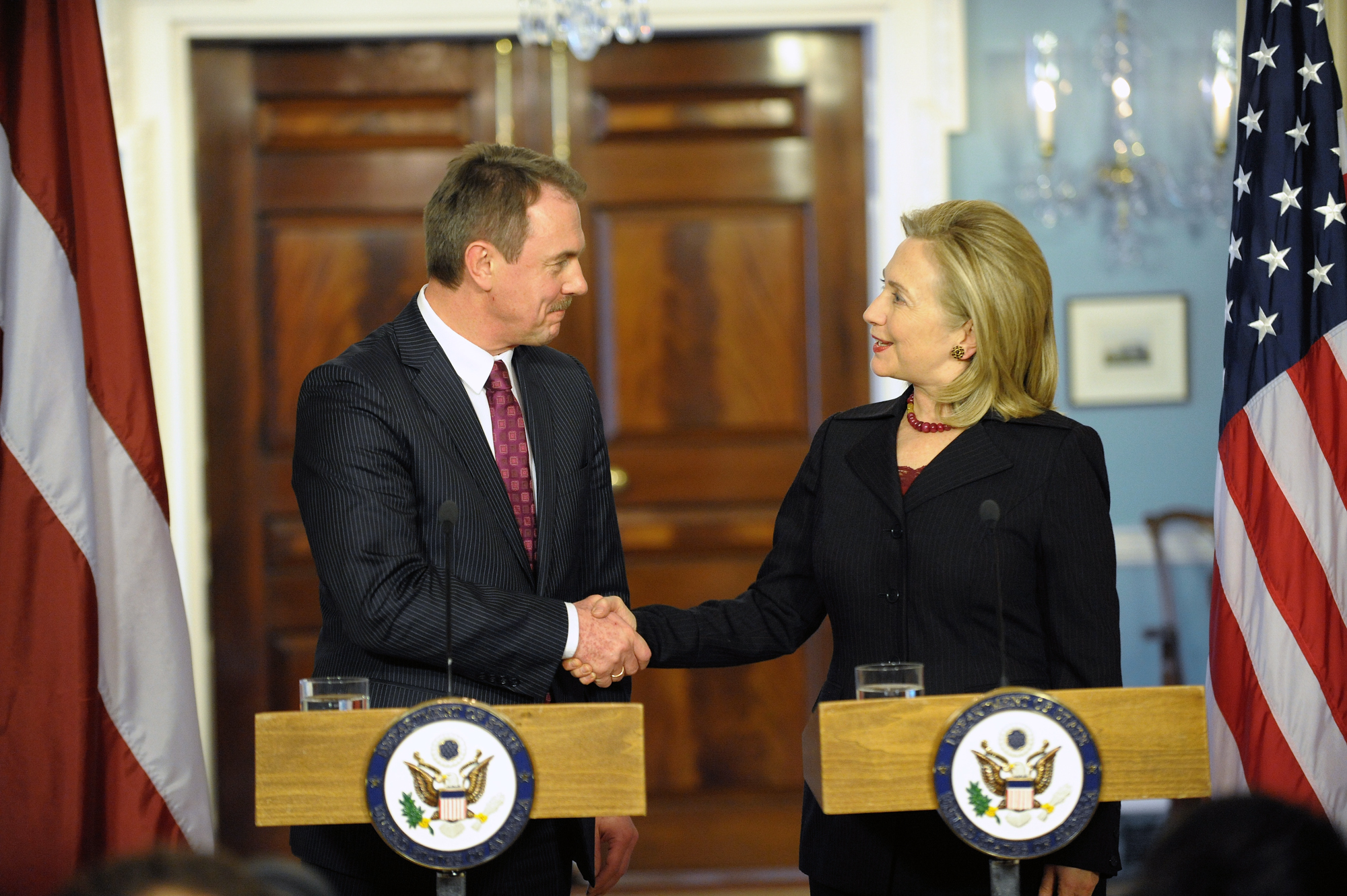

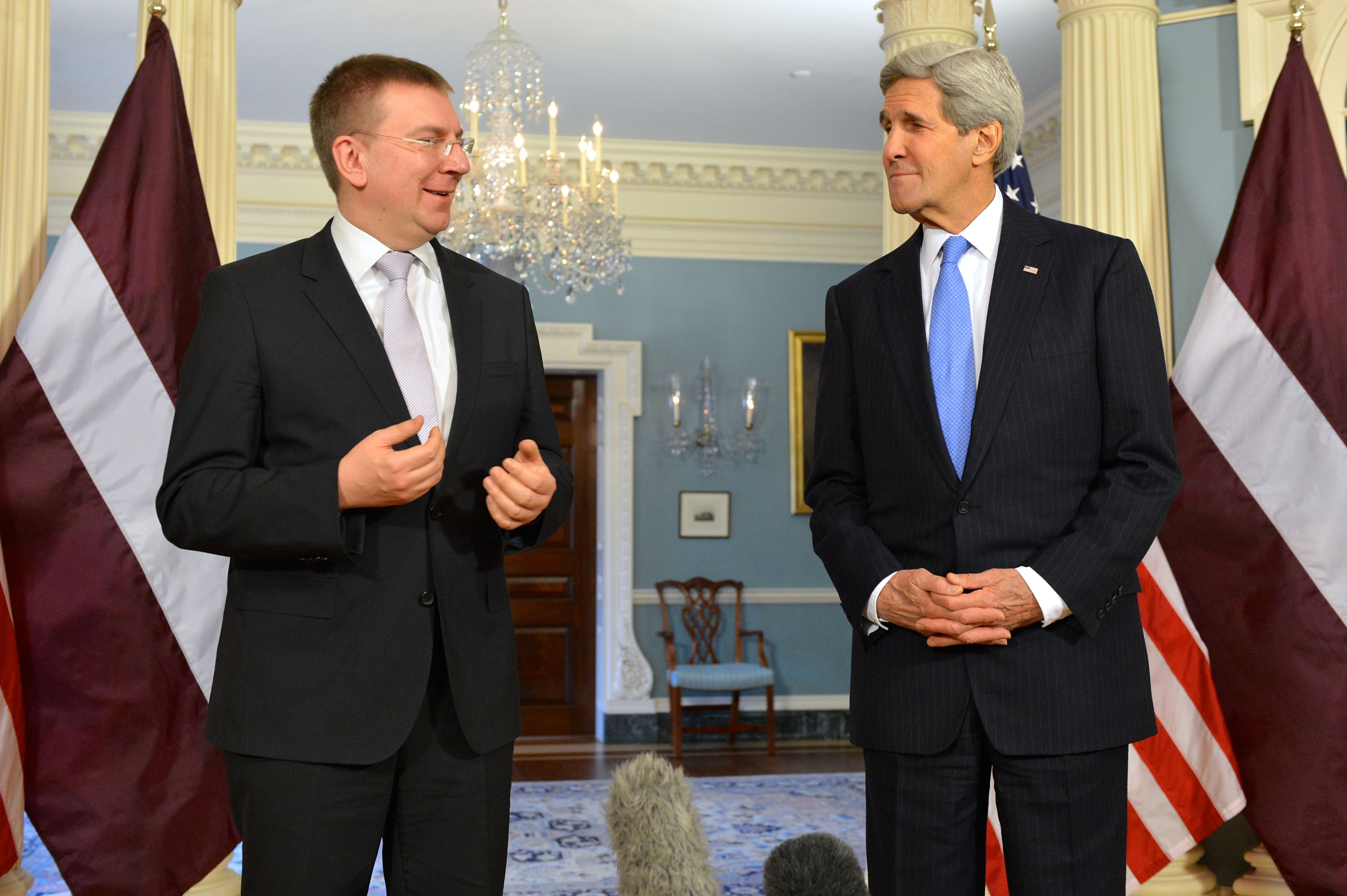

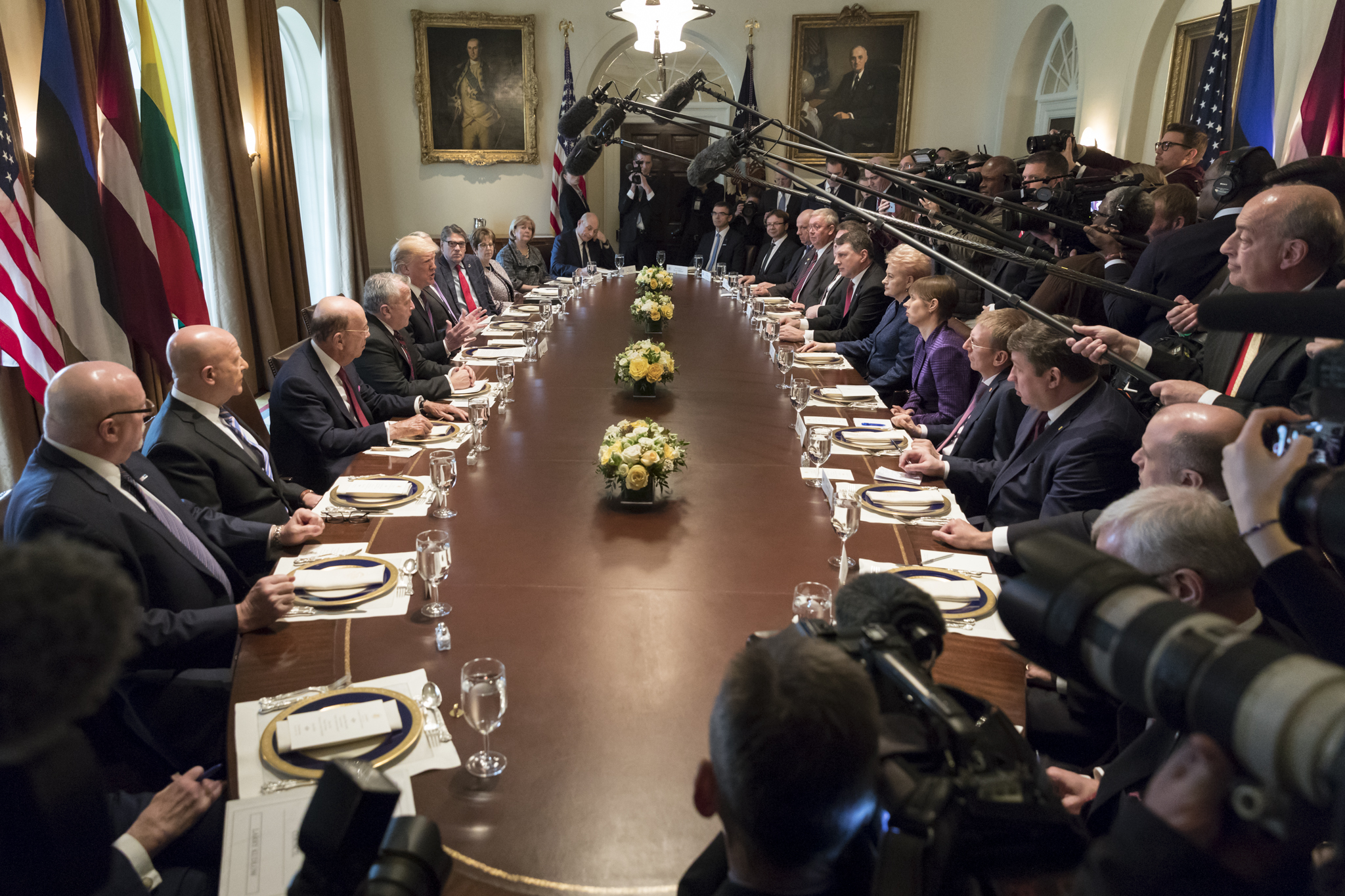

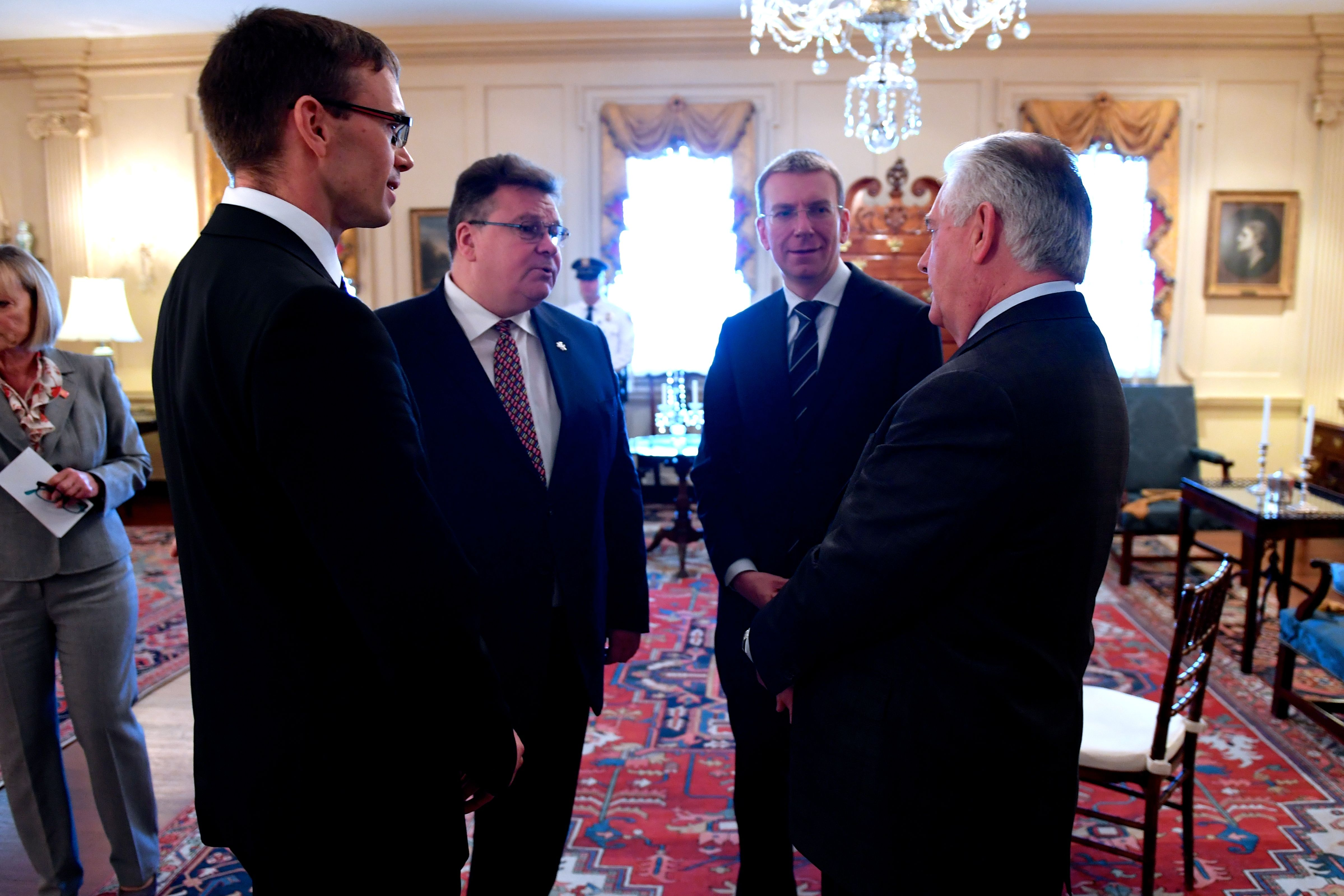

== Liechtenstein ==
Table of Trips
| Start | End | Guest | Title | Reason |
|---|---|---|---|---|
| April 30, 1979 | April 30, 1979 | Franz Joseph II | Prince | Private visit |

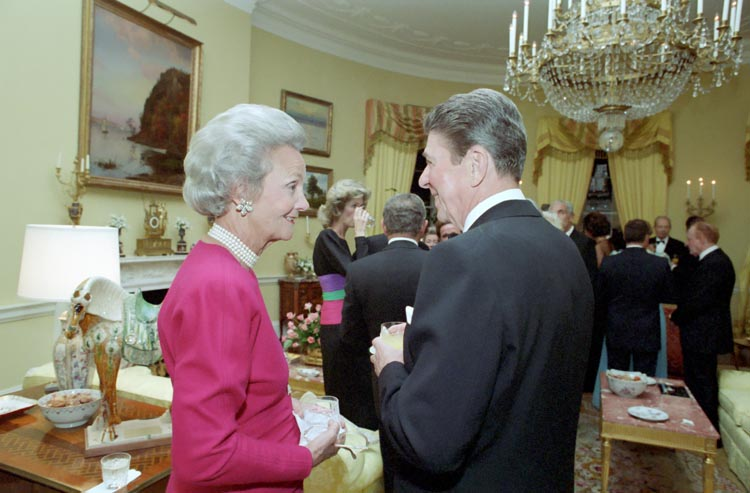

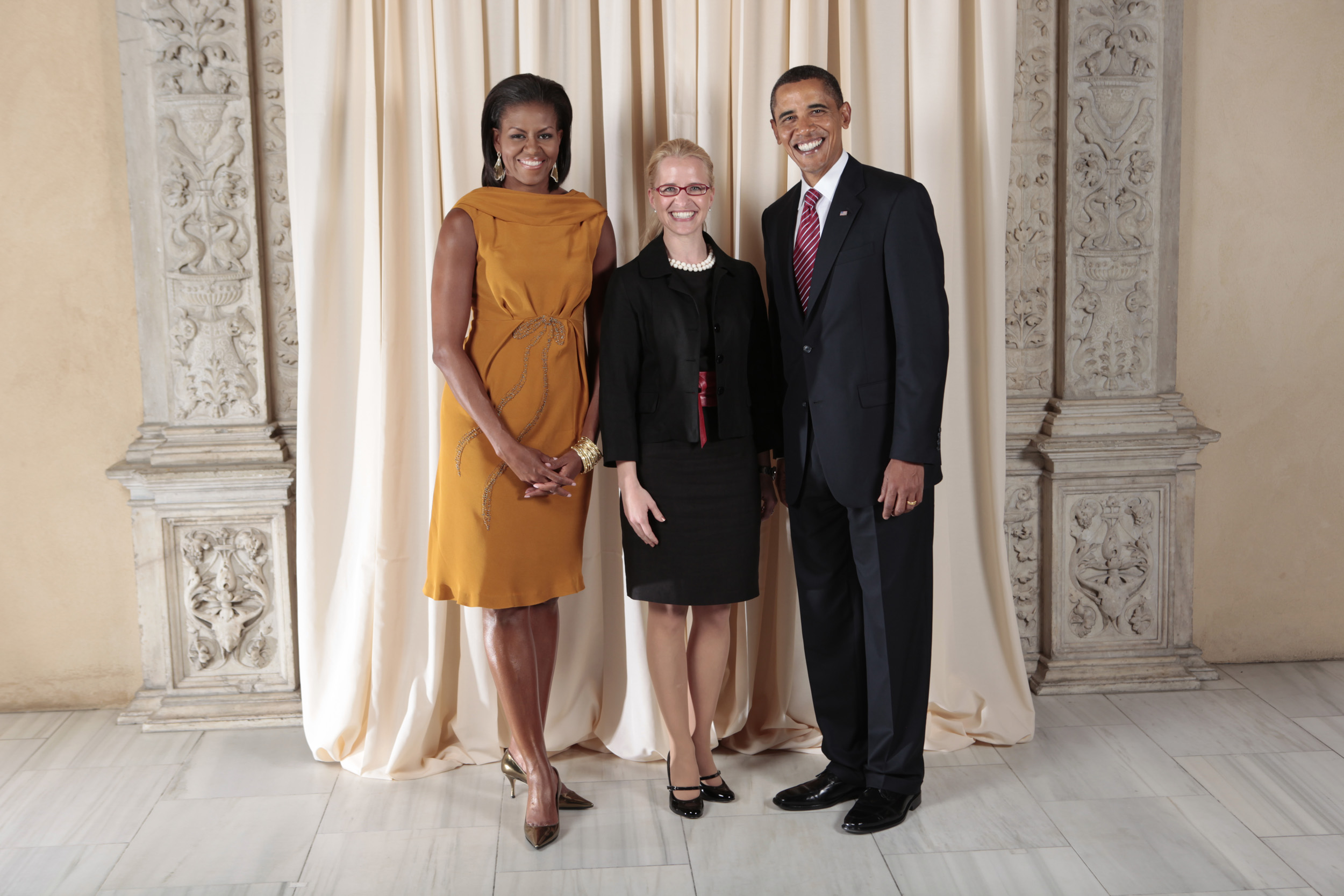

== Lithuania ==
Table of Trips
| Start | End | Guest | Title | Reason |
|---|---|---|---|---|
| July 6, 1992 | July 6, 1992 | Gediminas Vagnorius | Prime Minister | Met with Vice President Quayle and signed a bilateral trade and investment agreement. |
| October 27, 1993 | October 27, 1993 | Algirdas Brazauskas | President | Met with President Clinton at the U.N. General Assembly in New York City. |
| June 25, 1996 | June 27, 1996 | Algirdas Brazauskas | President | Working visit. Afterwards visited New York City. |
| January 14, 1998 | January 18, 1998 | Algirdas Brazauskas | President | Working Visit. Signed U.S.-Baltic Charter of Partnership. |
| April 23, 1999 | April 25, 1999 | Valdas Adamkus | President | Attended NATO's 50th Anniversary Summit. Arrived April 22. |
| January 16, 2002 | January 18, 2002 | Valdas Adamkus | President | Working visit. |
| December 8, 2003 | December 8, 2003 | Rolandas Paksas | President | Working visit. |
| March 27, 2004 | March 30, 2004 | Algirdas Brazauskas | Prime Minister | Working visit. Attended NATO Accession ceremony. |
| February 8, 2007 | February 13, 2007 | Valdas Adamkus | President | Working visit. |
| October 28, 2008 | October 29, 2008 | Valdas Adamkus | President | Working visit. |
| May 20, 2012 | May 21, 2012 | Dalia Grybauskaitė | President | Attended the NATO Summit meeting in Chicago. |
| August 30, 2013 | August 30, 2013 | Dalia Grybauskaitė | President | Working visit. |
| March 31, 2016 | April 1, 2016 | Dalia Grybauskaitė | President | Attended the Nuclear Security Summit. |
| April 3, 2018 | April 3, 2018 | Dalia Grybauskaitė | President | U.S.-Baltic Leaders Summit. |
| July 10, 2024 | July 11, 2024 | Gitanas Nausėda | President | Attended NATO 75th Anniversary Summit in Washington, D.C. |

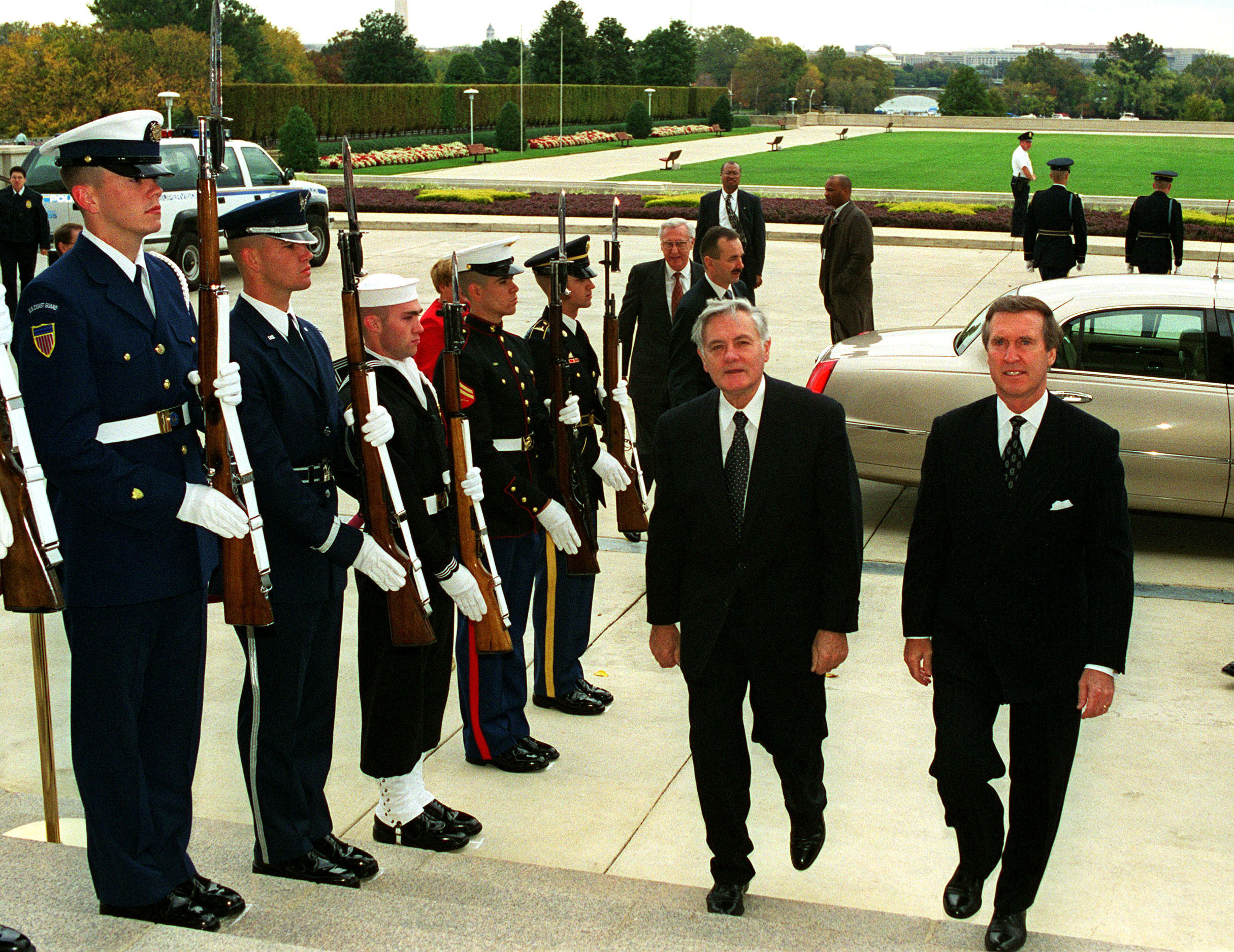

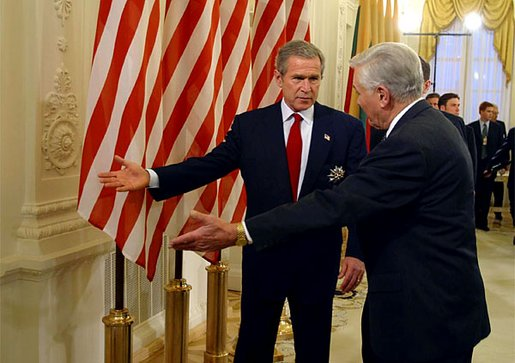

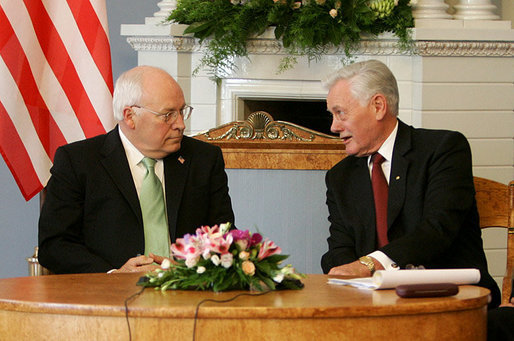

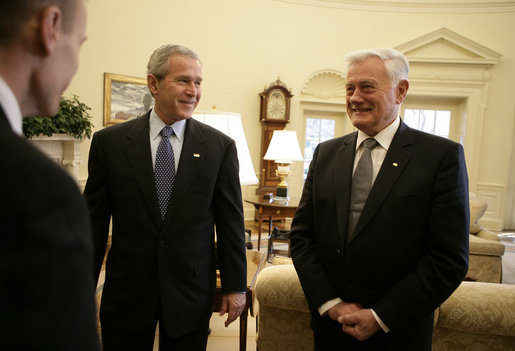

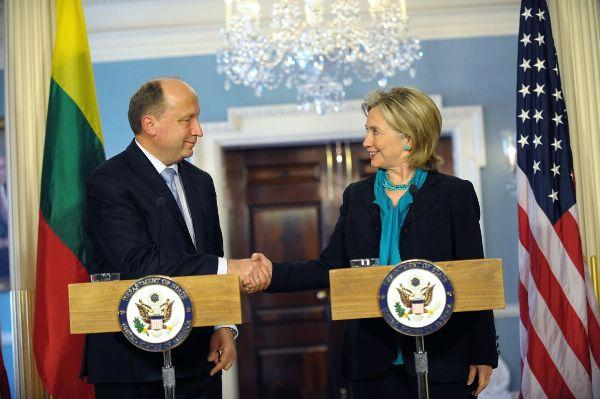

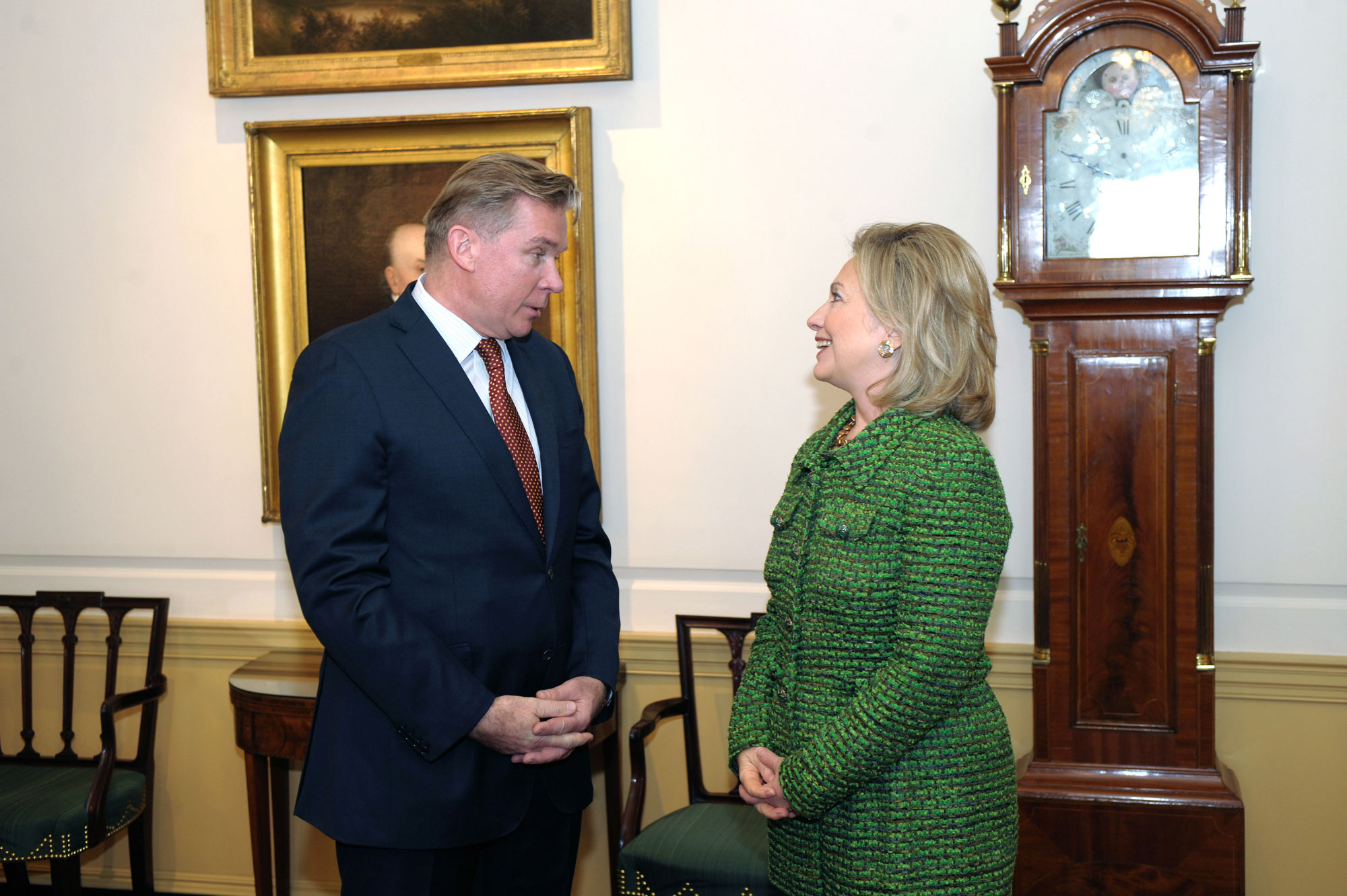

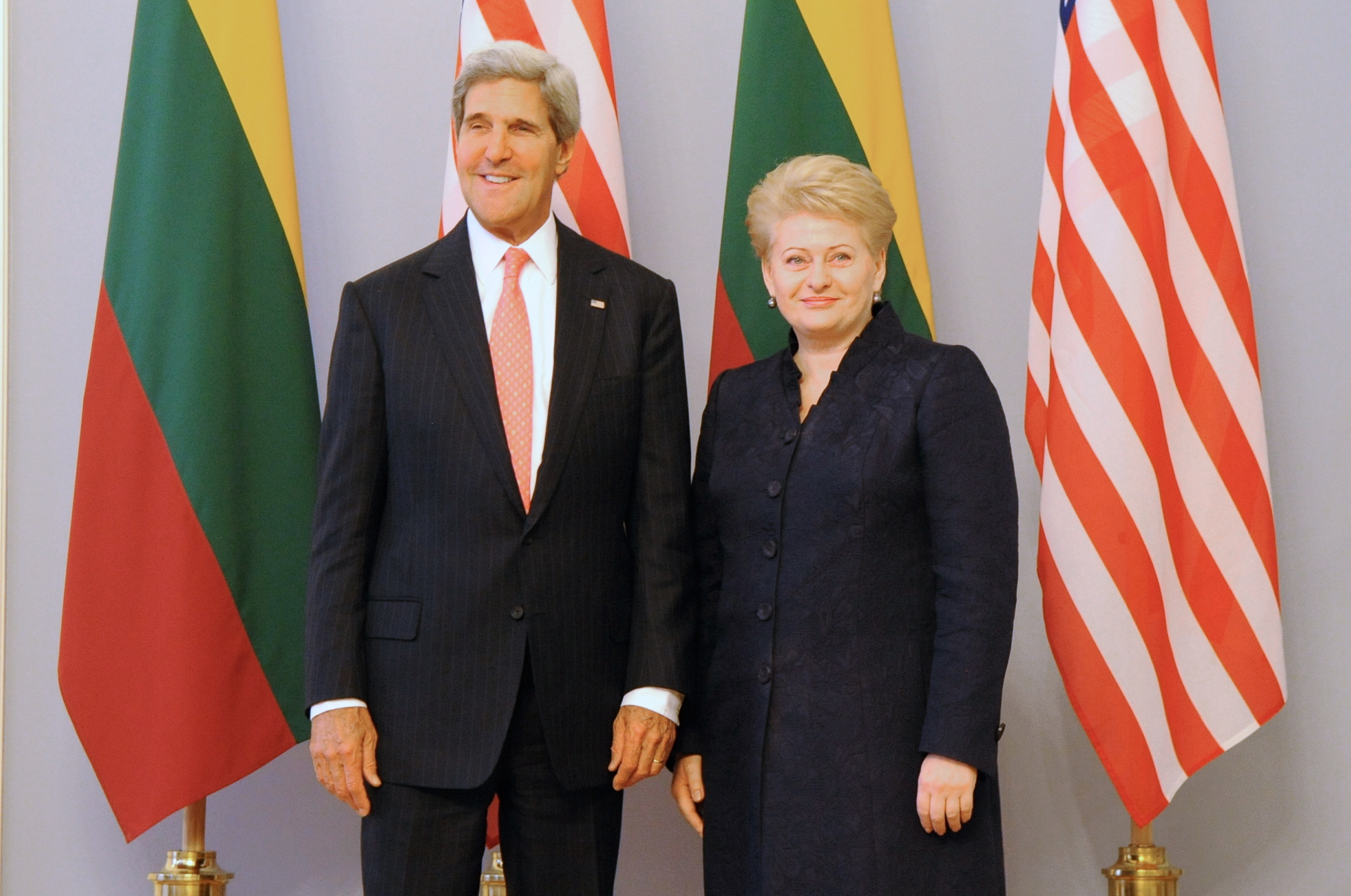

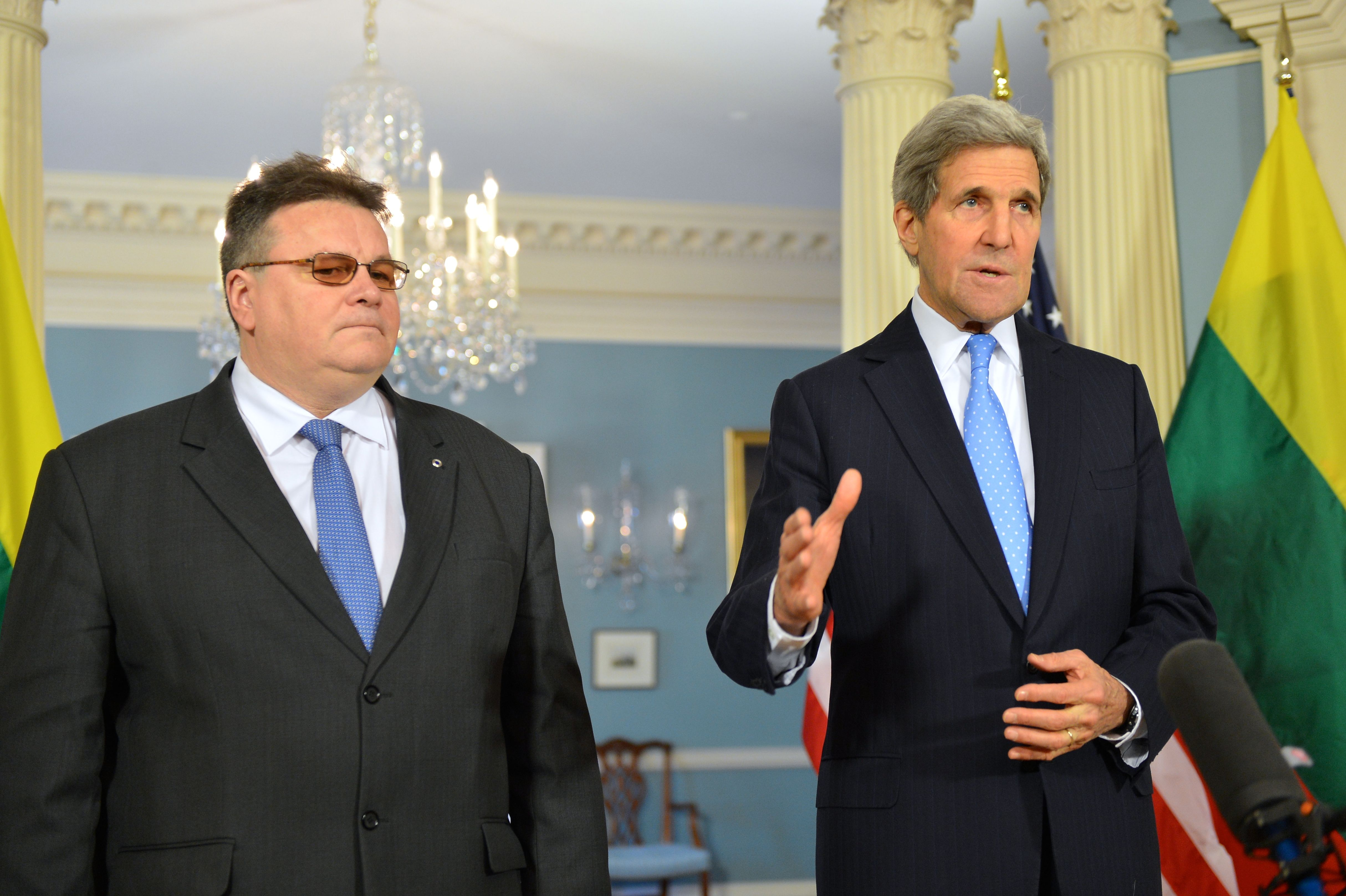

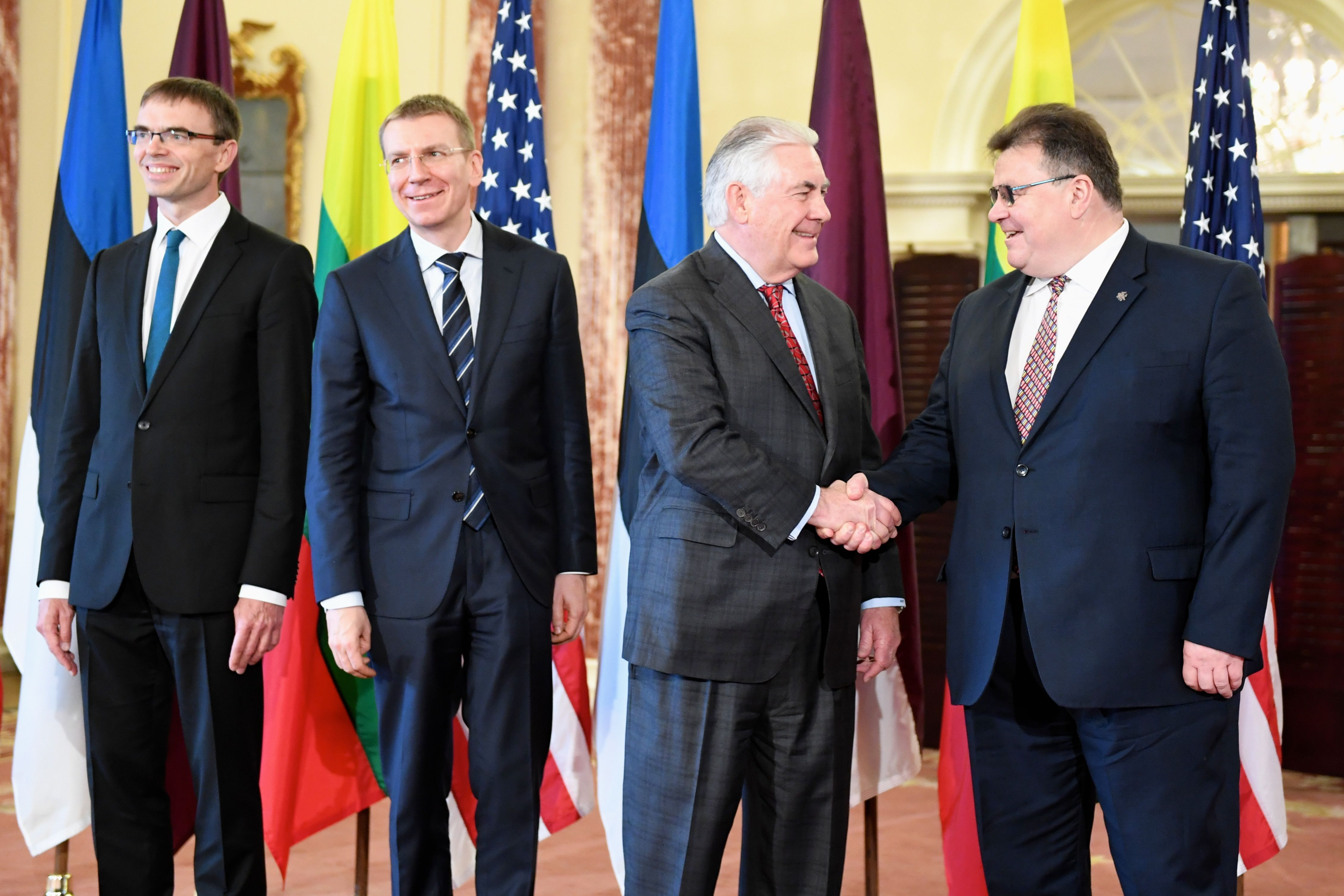

== Luxembourg ==
Table of Trips
| Start | End | Guest | Title | Reason |
|---|---|---|---|---|
| October 20, 1940 | October 20, 1940 | Charlotte | Grand Duchess | Informal meeting at Hyde Park. |
| February 12, 1941 | February 14, 1941 | Charlotte | Grand Duchess | Informal visit to Washington, D.C. |
| April 26, 1941 | May 2, 1941 | Charlotte | Grand Duchess | |
| May 23, 1942 | May 23, 1942 | Charlotte | Grand Duchess | Met with President Roosevelt in Washington, D.C. while returning to Montreal. |
| August 25, 1942 | August 25, 1942 | Charlotte | Grand Duchess | |
| April 30, 1963 | May 1, 1963 | Charlotte | Grand Duchess | State visit. In U.S. April 29 – May 4, visited Philadelphia, Chicago, Cape Canaveral, and New York City. |
| November 12, 1975 | November 12, 1975 | Gaston Thorn | Prime Minister | Private visit to Washington, D.C. while serving as President of the U.N. General Assembly. |
| October 2, 1977 | October 5, 1977 | Gaston Thorn | Prime Minister | Met with President Carter October 4 in New York City while attending U.N. General Assembly session. |
| May 30, 1978 | May 31, 1978 | Gaston Thorn | Prime Minister | Attended NATO Summit conference. |
| November 12, 1984 | November 15, 1984 | Jean | Grand Duke | State visit; visited Colorado Springs, San Jose, San Francisco, and Chicago. Departed U.S. November 19. |
| August 6, 1995 | August 8, 1995 | Jean-Claude Juncker | Prime Minister | Official working visit. |
| December 4, 1997 | December 5, 1997 | Jean-Claude Juncker | Prime Minister | Attended U.S.-EU Summit as President of the European Council. |
| April 23, 1999 | April 25, 1999 | Jean-Claude Juncker | Prime Minister | Attended NATO's 50th Anniversary Summit . |
| March 4, 2002 | March 6, 2002 | Jean-Claude Juncker | Prime Minister | Working visit. |
| April 15, 2005 | April 15, 2005 | Jean-Claude Juncker | Prime Minister | Private visit. |
| June 20, 2005 | June 20, 2005 | Jean-Claude Juncker | Prime Minister | Working visit. Attended the U.S.-EU Summit Meeting. |
| April 9, 2008 | April 12, 2008 | Jean-Claude Juncker | Prime Minister | Working visit |
| May 20, 2012 | May 21, 2012 | Jean-Claude Juncker | Prime Minister | Attended the NATO Summit meeting in Chicago |
| July 10, 2024 | July 11, 2024 | Luc Frieden | Prime Minister | Attended NATO 75th Anniversary Summit in Washington, D.C. |

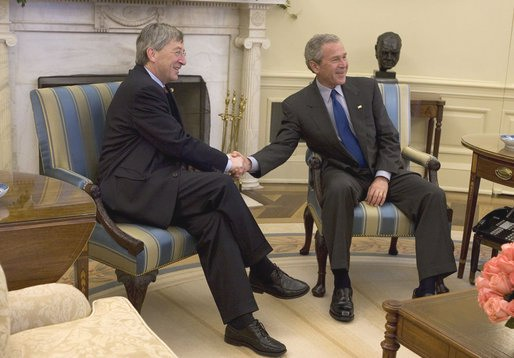

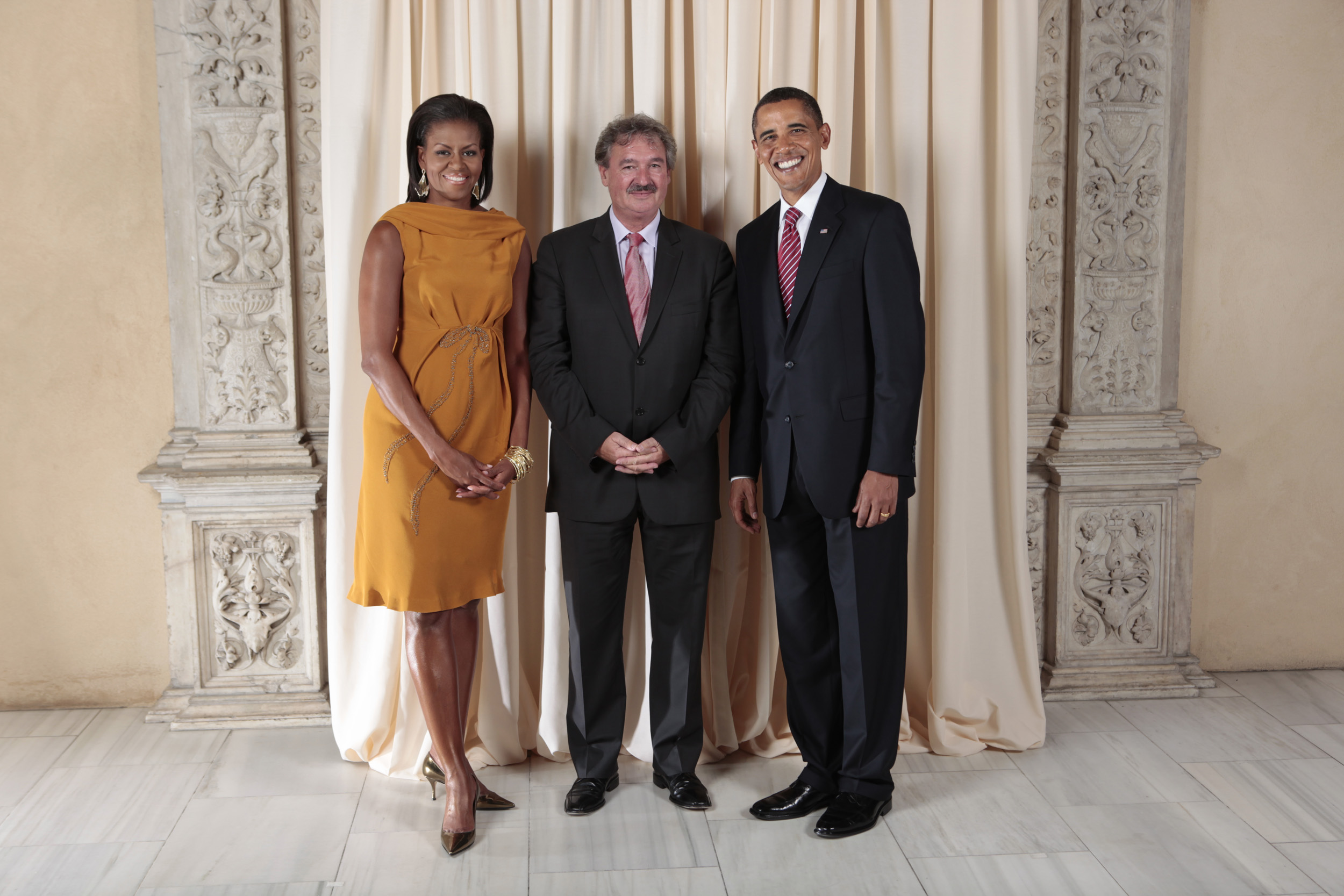

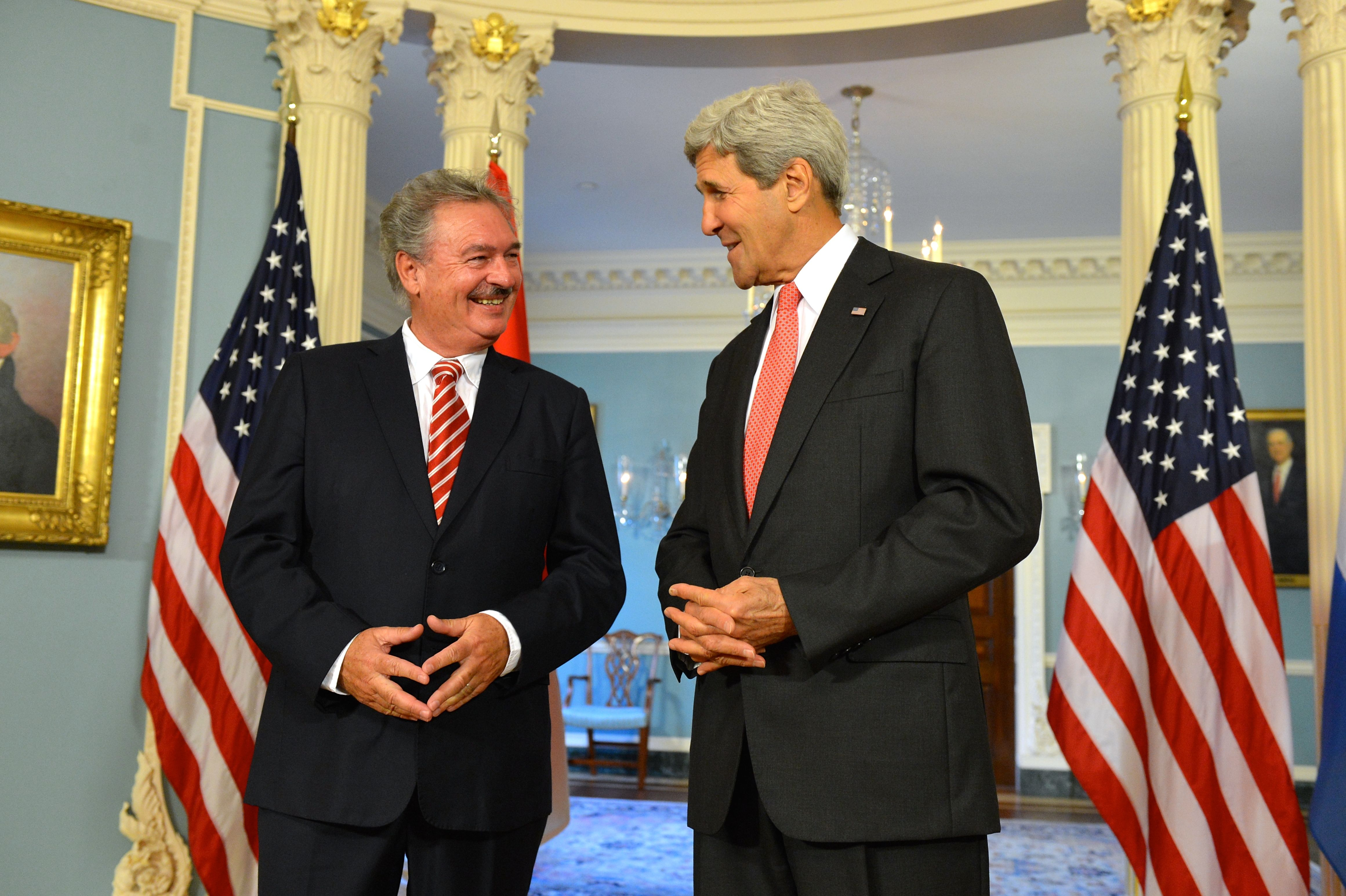

== Malta ==
Table of Trips
| Start | End | Guest | Title | Reason |
|---|---|---|---|---|
| October 4, 1967 | October 4, 1967 | George Borg Olivier | Prime Minister | Informal visit. |
| October 24, 1970 | October 24, 1970 | George Borg Olivier | Prime Minister | Attended White House dinner on 25th Anniversary of the U.N. |
| October 3, 2005 | October 3, 2005 | Lawrence Gonzi | Prime Minister | Working visit. |

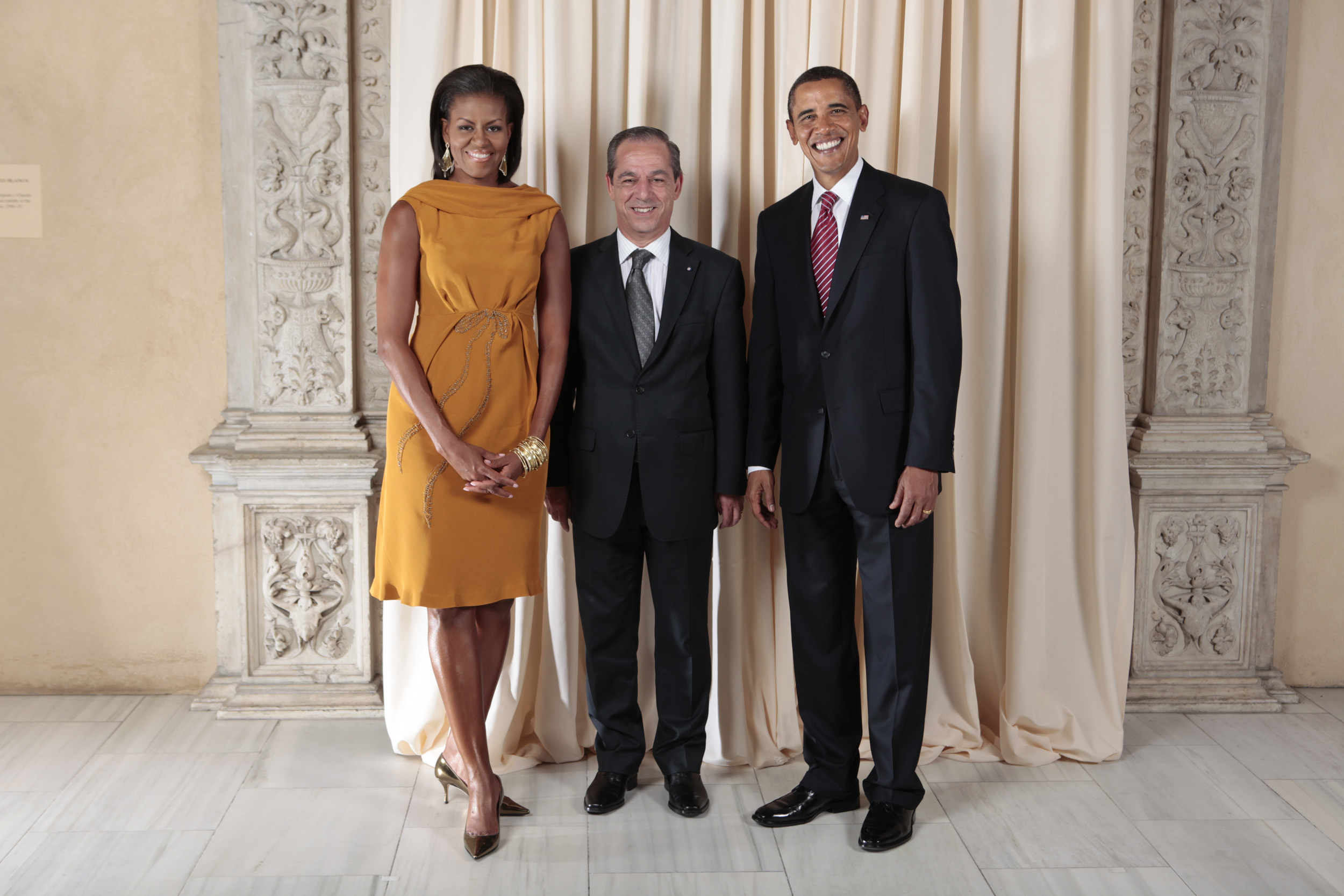

== Moldova ==
Table of Trips
| Start | End | Guest | Title | Reason |
|---|---|---|---|---|
| February 18, 1992 | February 18, 1992 | Mircea Snegur | President | Met with President Bush during a private visit. |
| April 20, 1993 | April 22, 1993 | Andrei Sangheli | Prime Minister | Attended dedication of the Holocaust Memorial Museum and met with President Bill Clinton on April 21. |
| January 29, 1995 | February 2, 1995 | Mircea Snegur | President | Working visit. |
| April 23, 1999 | April 25, 1999 | Petru Lucinschi | President | Attended NATO's 50th Anniversary Summit. |
| December 16, 2002 | December 20, 2002 | Vladimir Voronin | President | Working visit. |

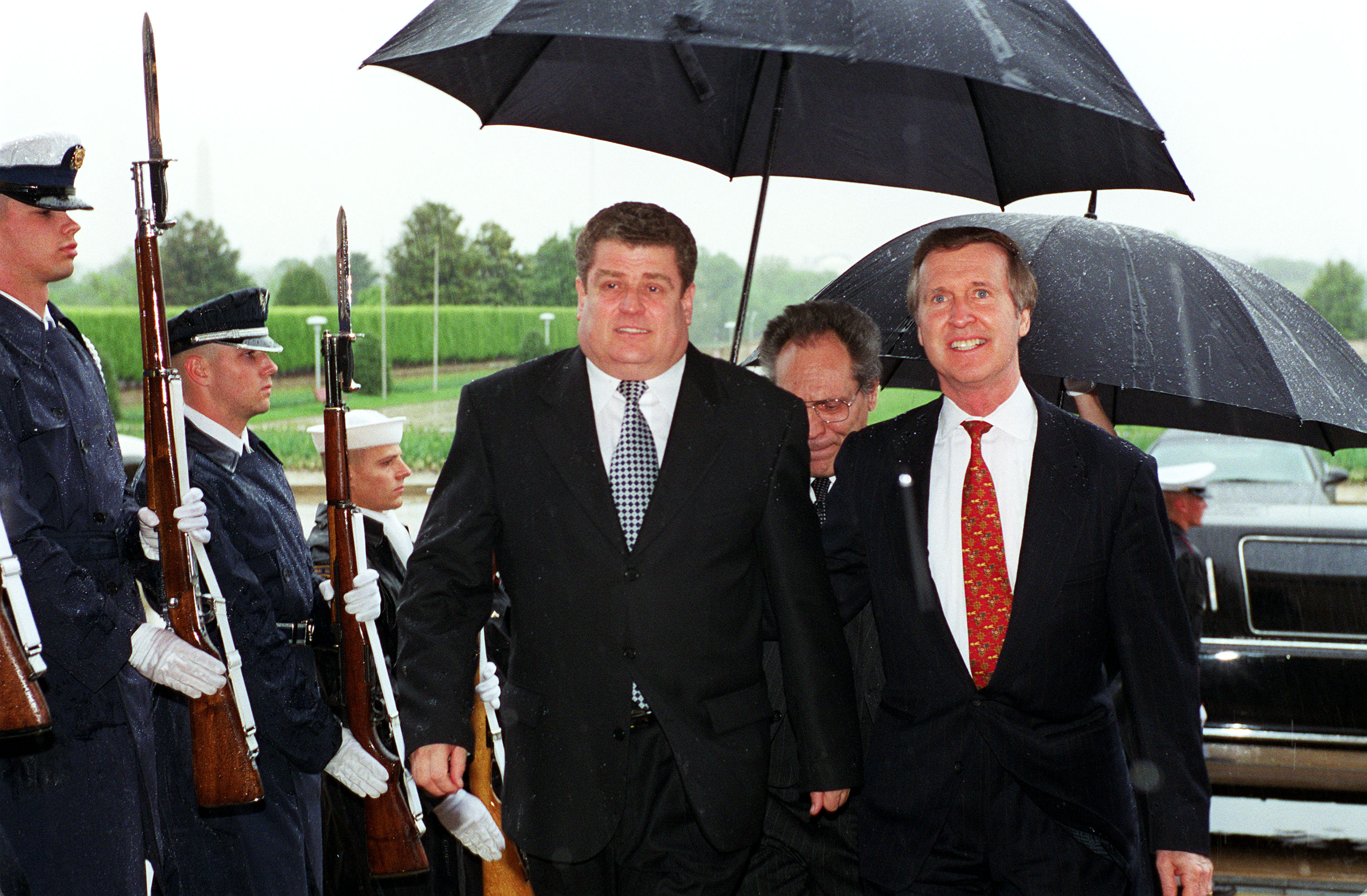

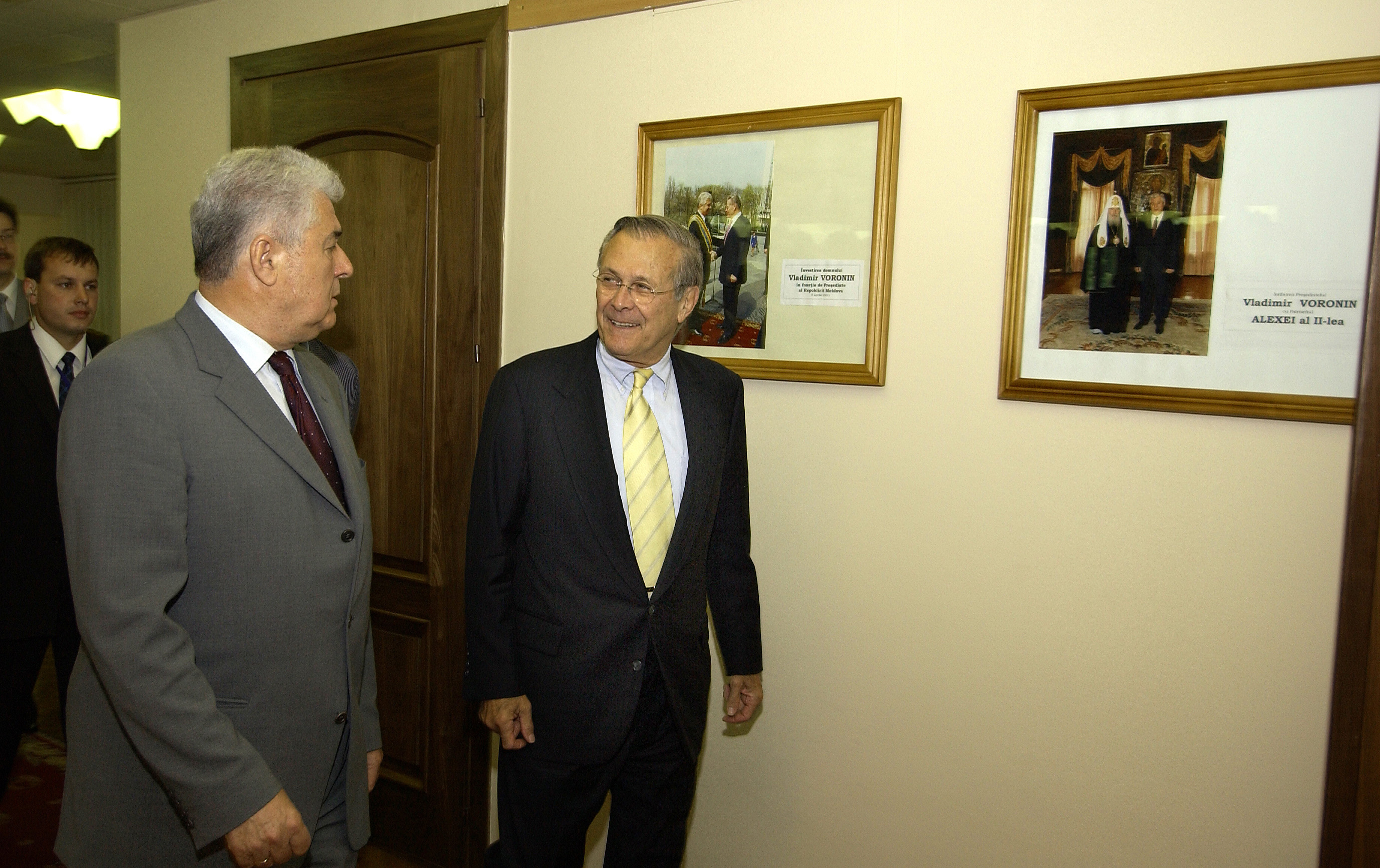

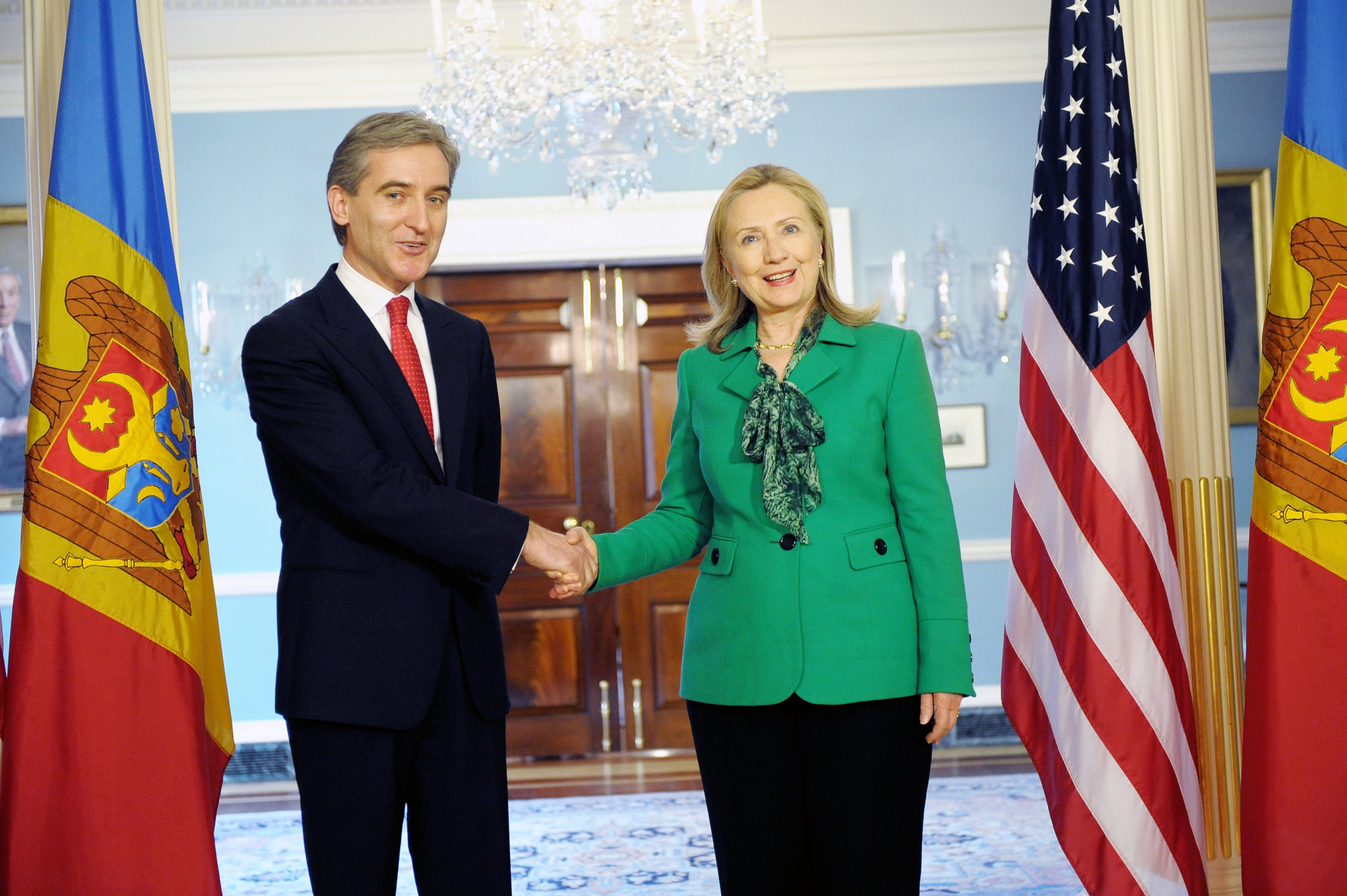

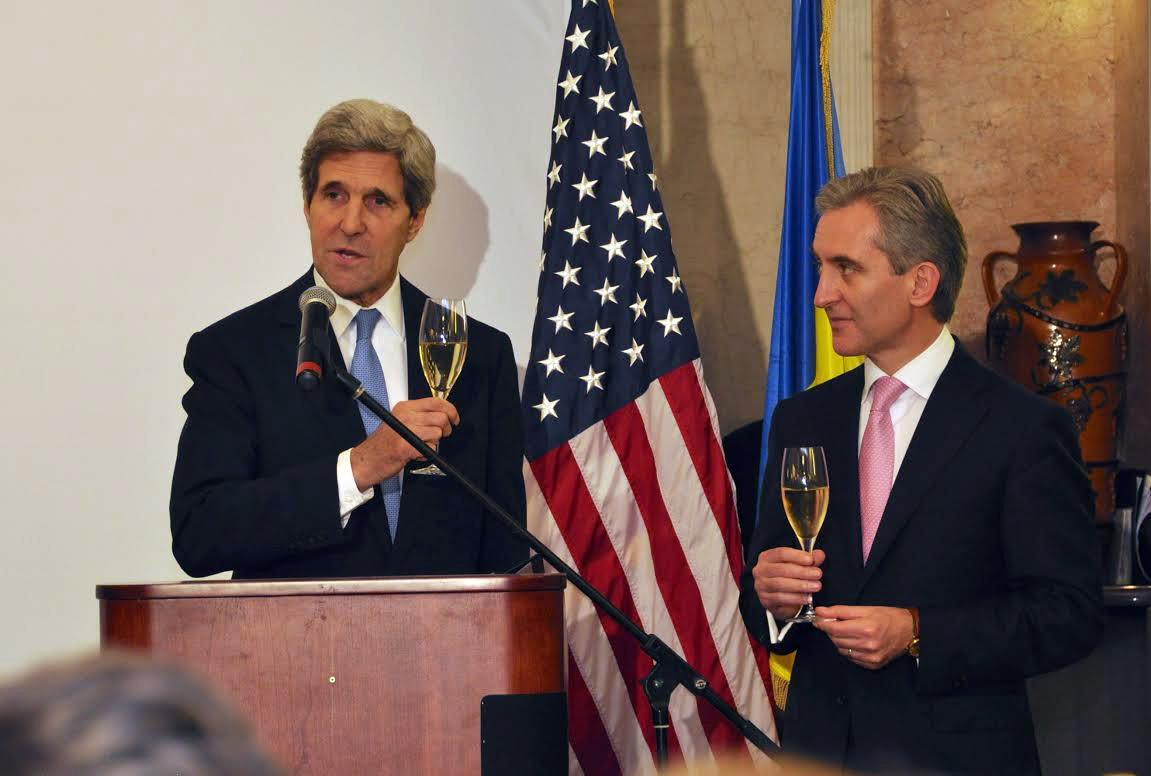

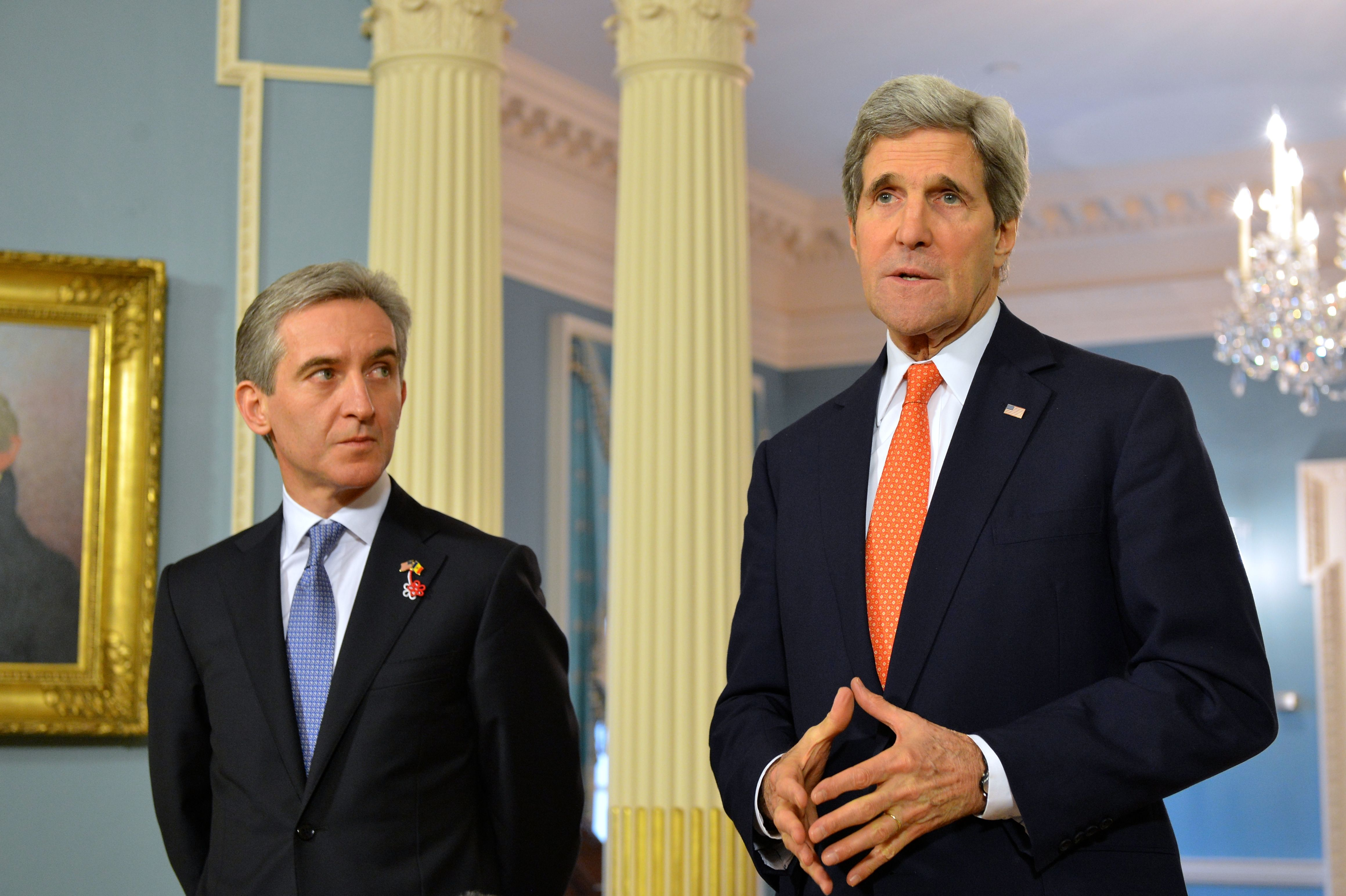

== Monaco ==
Table of Trips
| Start | End | Guest | Title | Reason |
|---|---|---|---|---|
| October 19, 1913 | October 20, 1913 | Albert I | Prince | Arrived in the U.S. September 11, 1913. Met with President Wilson October 20, 1913 during a private visit. |
| October 11, 1956 | October 11, 1956 | Rainier III | Prince | Unofficial courtesy call. In U.S. September 13 – November 7, visiting New York City, Philadelphia (Pennsylvania), and Atlantic City. |
| May 24, 1961 | May 24, 1961 | Rainier III | Prince | Luncheon (social visit). Left U.S. May 30. |
| July 4, 1976 | July 4, 1976 | Rainier III | Prince | Unofficial visit to New York City to view the parade of Tall Ships |
| February 14, 1984 | February 18, 1984 | Rainier III | Prince | Private visit. Met with President Reagan February 18. |

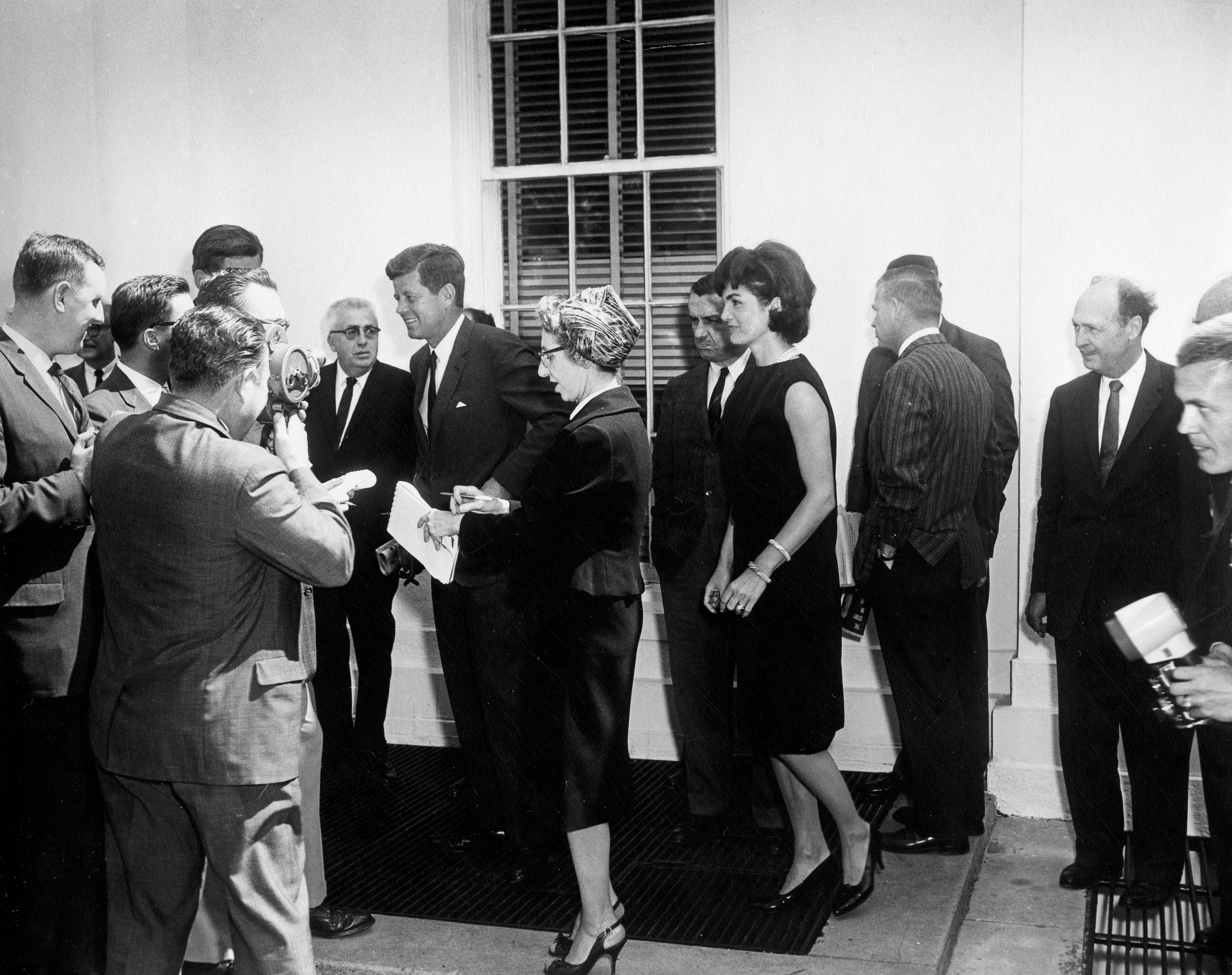

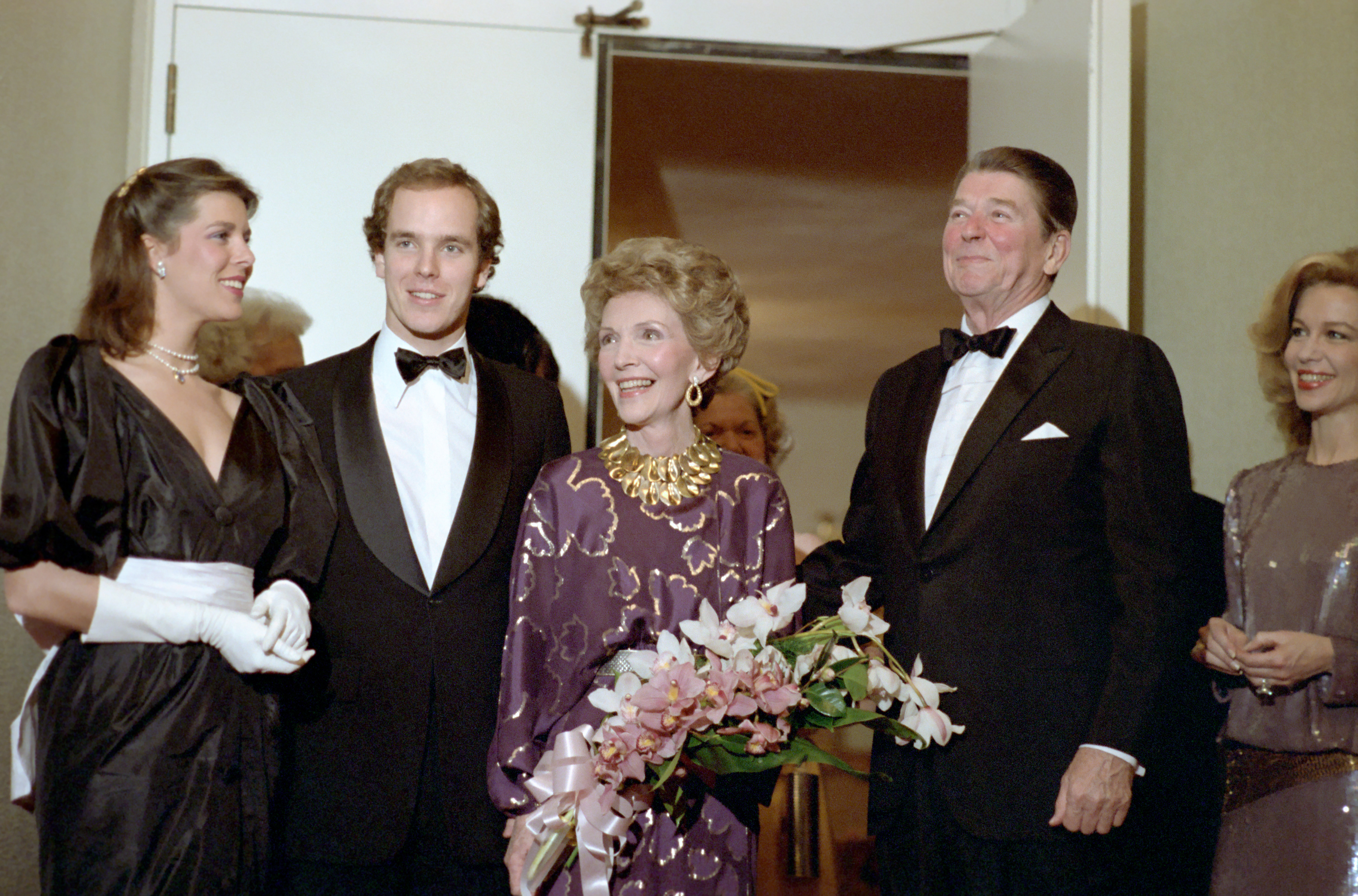

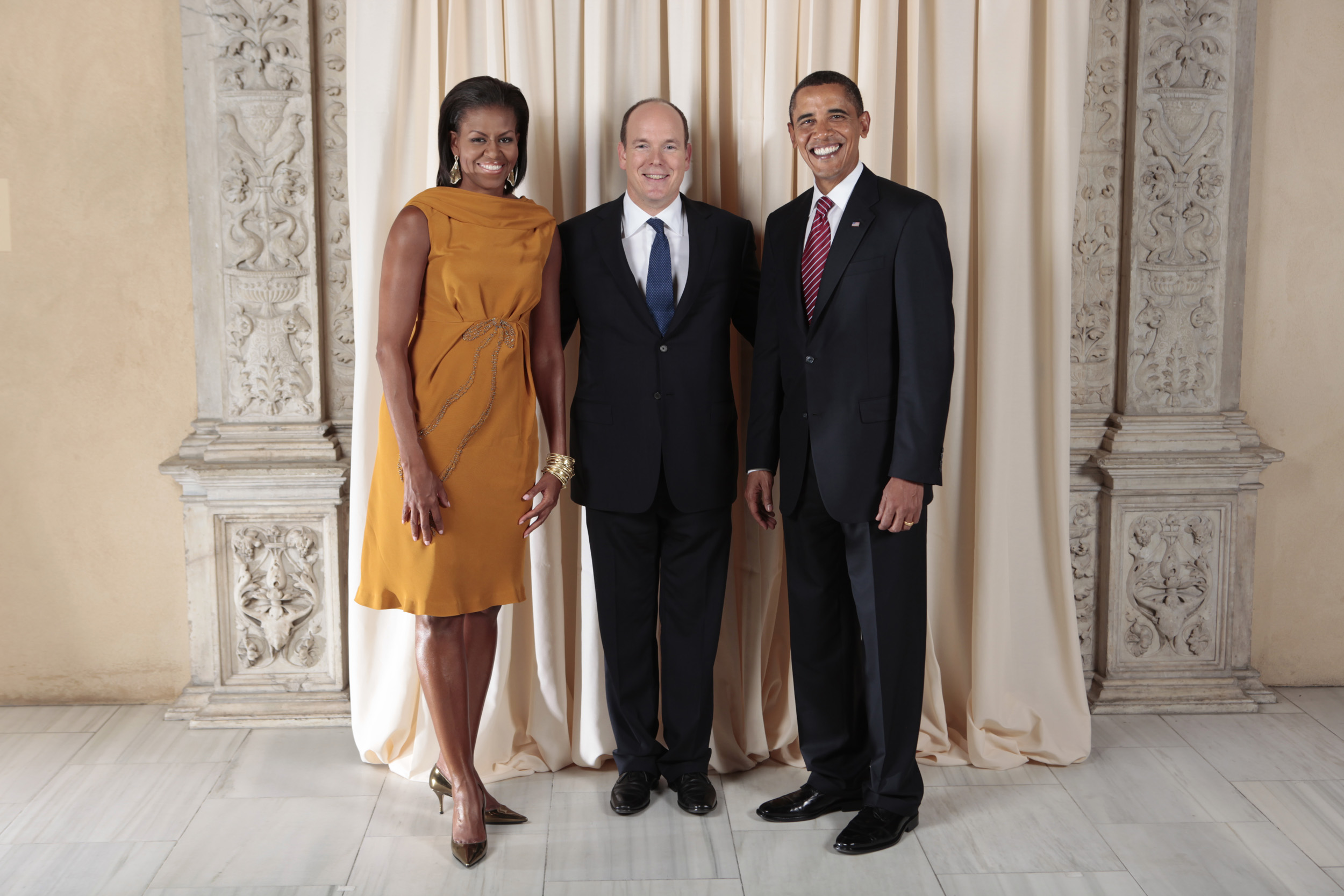

== Montenegro ==
Table of Trips
| Start | End | Guest | Title | Reason |
|---|---|---|---|---|
| May 20, 2012 | May 21, 2012 | Igor Luksic | Prime Minister | Attended the NATO Summit meeting in Chicago |
| July 10, 2024 | July 11, 2024 | Milojko Spajić | Prime Minister | Attended NATO 75th Anniversary Summit in Washington, D.C. |

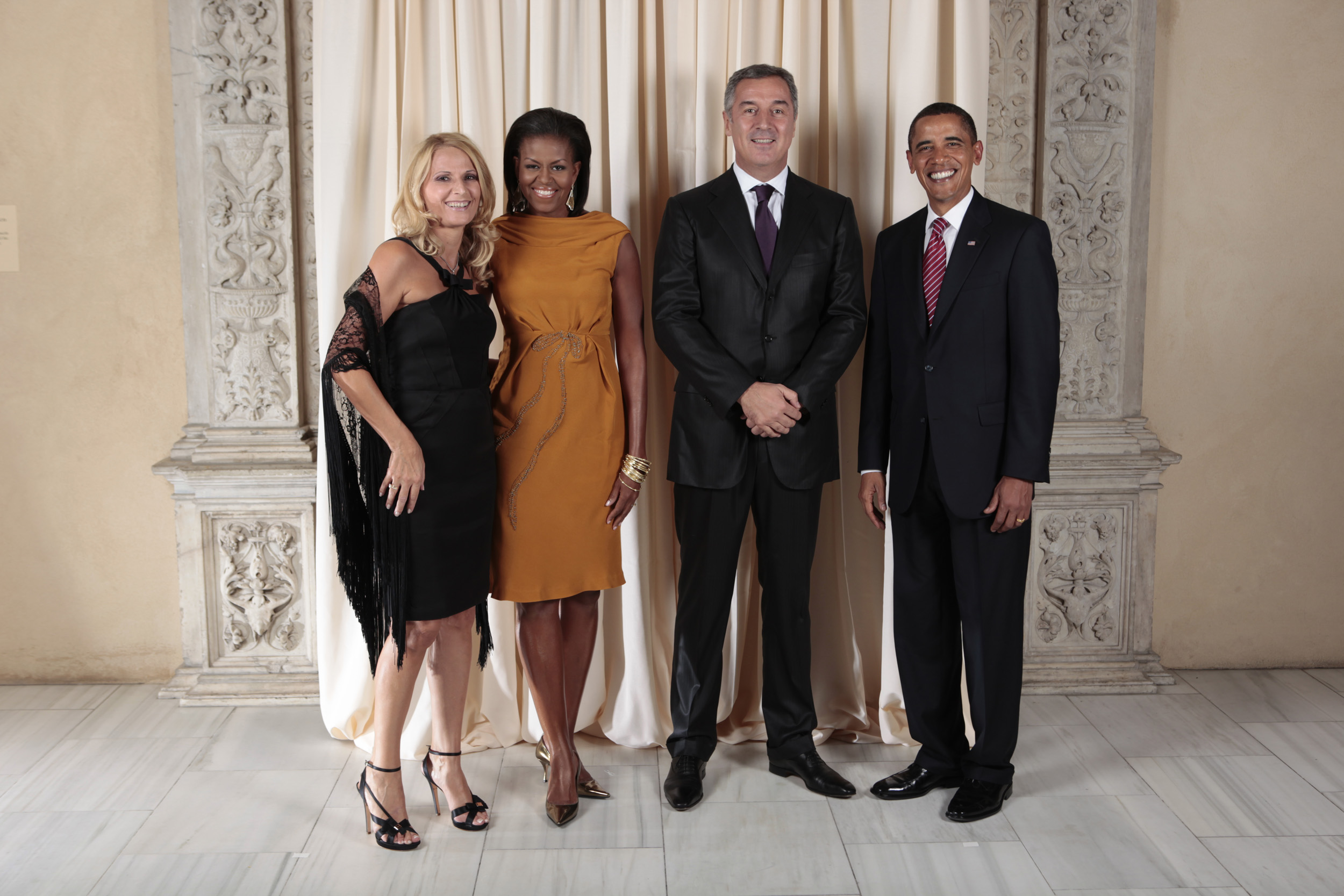

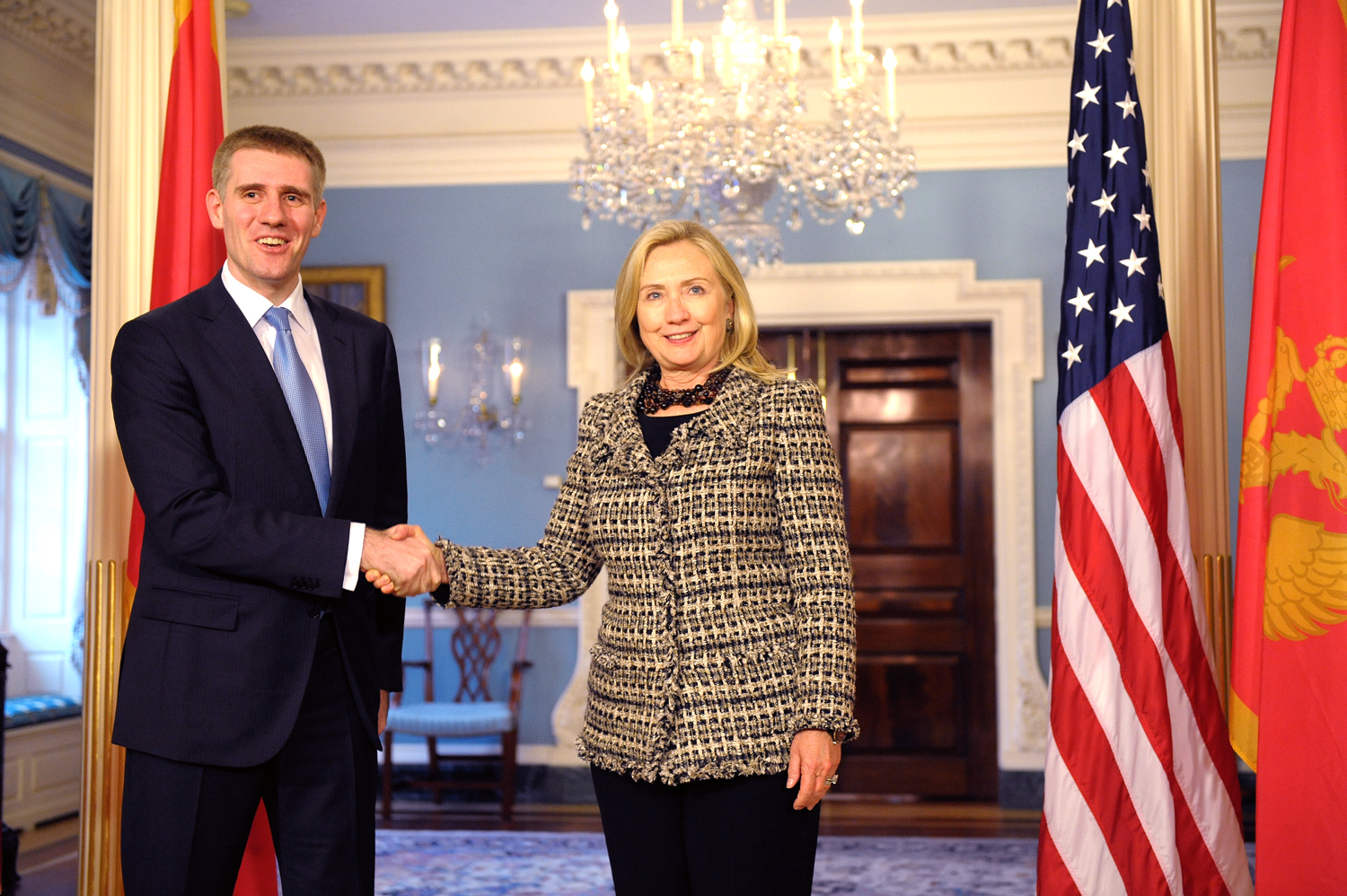

== Netherlands ==
Table of Trips
| Start | End | Guest | Title | Reason |
|---|---|---|---|---|
| August 5, 1942 | August 7, 1942 | Wilhelmina | Queen | In U.S. June 24 – August 11. Vacationed in Lee; visited New York City, Boston, and Albany |
| January 20, 1952 | January 23, 1952 | Willem Drees | Prime Minister | Informal visit. In U.S. January 12–24, visiting New York City, Bridgeport and Pittsburgh |
| April 2, 1952 | April 5, 1952 | Juliana | Queen | Addressed U.S. Congress April 3. Afterwards visited Philadelphia, New York City, Knoxville, Detroit, Grand Rapids, Holland, and Ann Arbor, San Francisco, and Los Angeles. Departed U.S. April 22. |
| May 27, 1969 | May 29, 1969 | Piet de Jong | Prime Minister | Official visit. In U.S. May 26–29; visited Williamsburg, Annapolis, and New York City. Met with President Nixon. |
| January 26, 1972 | January 26, 1972 | Barend Biesheuvel | Prime Minister | Private visit. |
| May 13, 1975 | May 15, 1975 | Joop den Uyl | Prime Minister | Private visit. |
| May 30, 1978 | May 31, 1978 | Dries van Agt | Prime Minister | Attended NATO Summit conference. |
| December 7, 1979 | December 7, 1979 | Dries van Agt | Prime Minister | Private visit. |
| March 30, 1981 | April 1, 1981 | Dries van Agt | Prime Minister | Official working visit. Met with Vice President Bush. |
| April 18, 1982 | April 22, 1982 | Beatrix | Queen | State visit. Addressed Joint Session of U.S. Congress April 21; visited Philadelphia and New York City. Departed U.S. April 24. |
| March 14, 1983 | March 16, 1983 | Ruud Lubbers | Prime Minister | Official working visit. |
| January 19, 1984 | January 20, 1984 | Ruud Lubbers | Prime Minister | Private visit. Met with President Reagan January 19. |
| May 9, 1989 | May 9, 1989 | Ruud Lubbers | Prime Minister | Met with President Bush during a private visit. |
| January 4, 1994 | January 5, 1994 | Ruud Lubbers | Prime Minister | Official working visit. |
| February 26, 1995 | February 28, 1995 | Wim Kok | Prime Minister | Official working visit. |
| November 7, 1995 | November 10, 1995 | Beatrix | Queen | Met with President Clinton during a private visit. |
| January 4, 1999 | January 4, 1999 | Ruud Lubbers | Prime Minister | Official working visit. |
| April 23, 1999 | April 25, 1999 | Wim Kok | Prime Minister | Attended NATO's 50th Anniversary Summit. |
| September 27, 2000 | September 28, 2000 | Wim Kok | Prime Minister | Official working visit. |
| September 3, 2003 | September 3, 2003 | Jan Peter Balkenende | Prime Minister | Working visit. |
| March 15, 2004 | March 16, 2004 | Jan Peter Balkenende | Prime Minister | Working visit. |
| June 5, 2008 | June 8, 2008 | Jan Peter Balkenende | Prime Minister | Working visit. |
| November 14, 2008 | November 15, 2008 | Jan Peter Balkenende | Prime Minister | Attended the G-20 Economic Summit meeting. |
| July 14, 2009 | July 14, 2009 | Jan Peter Balkenende | Prime Minister | Working visit. |
| September 24, 2009 | September 25, 2009 | Jan Peter Balkenende | Prime Minister | Attended the G-20 Economic Summit in Pittsburgh. |
| April 12, 2010 | April 13, 2010 | Jan Peter Balkenende | Prime Minister | Attended the Nuclear Security Summit. |
| November 28, 2011 | November 29, 2011 | Mark Rutte | Prime Minister | Working visit. |
| May 20, 2012 | May 21, 2012 | Mark Rutte | Prime Minister | Attended the NATO Summit meeting in Chicago. |
| June 1, 2015 | June 1, 2015 | Willem-Alexander | King | Working visit. |
| March 31, 2016 | April 1, 2016 | Mark Rutte | Prime Minister | Attended the Nuclear Security Summit. |
| July 1, 2018 | July 2, 2018 | Mark Rutte | Prime Minister | Working visit. |
| July 17, 2019 | July 18, 2019 | Mark Rutte | Prime Minister | Working visit. |
| January 17, 2023 | January 17, 2023 | Mark Rutte | Prime Minister | Official Working visit. |
| July 10, 2024 | July 11, 2024 | Dick Schoof | Prime Minister | Attended NATO 75th Anniversary Summit in Washington, D.C. |

== North Macedonia ==
Table of Trips
| Start | End | Guest | Title | Reason |
|---|---|---|---|---|
| June 16, 1997 | June 19, 1997 | Kiro Gligorov | President | Working visit. |
| June 29, 1998 | June 30, 1998 | Branko Crvenkovski | Prime Minister | Met with Vice President Gore. |
| February 4, 1999 | February 4, 1999 | Ljubčo Georgievski | Prime Minister | Met with President Clinton during a private visit. |
| April 23, 1999 | April 25, 1999 | Kiro Gligorov | President | Attended NATO's 50th Anniversary Summit. |
| April 30, 2001 | May 3, 2001 | Boris Trajkovski | President | Working visit. |
| March 28, 2004 | March 29, 2004 | Branko Crvenkovski | Prime Minister | Working visit. Attended NATO Accession ceremony. |
| October 26, 2005 | October 27, 2005 | Vlado Bučkovski | Prime Minister | Working visit. |
| May 20, 2012 | May 21, 2012 | Gjorge Ivanov | President | Attended the NATO Summit meeting in Chicago |
| July 10, 2024 | July 11, 2024 | Hristijan Mickoski | Prime Minister | Attended NATO 75th Anniversary Summit in Washington, D.C. |

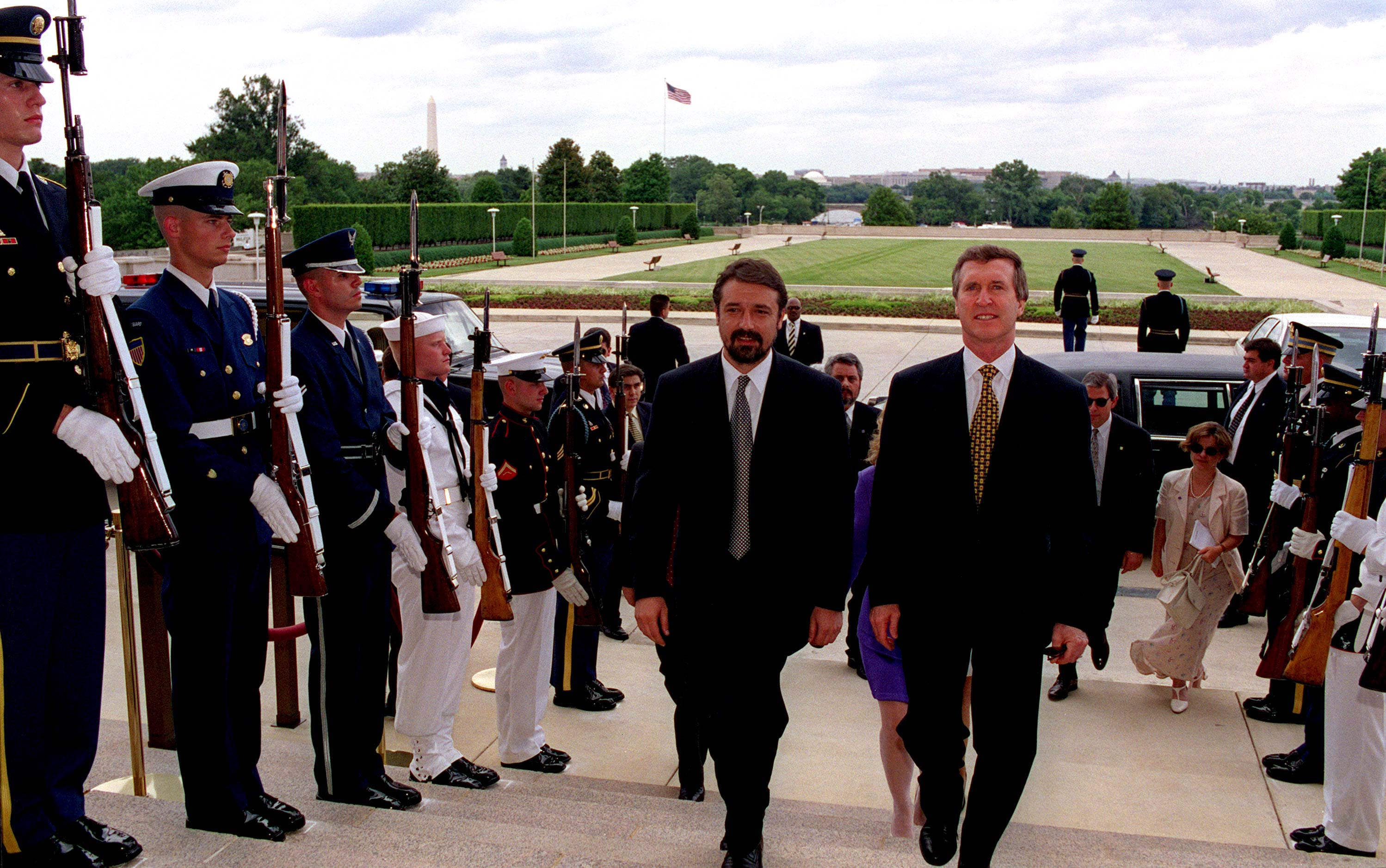

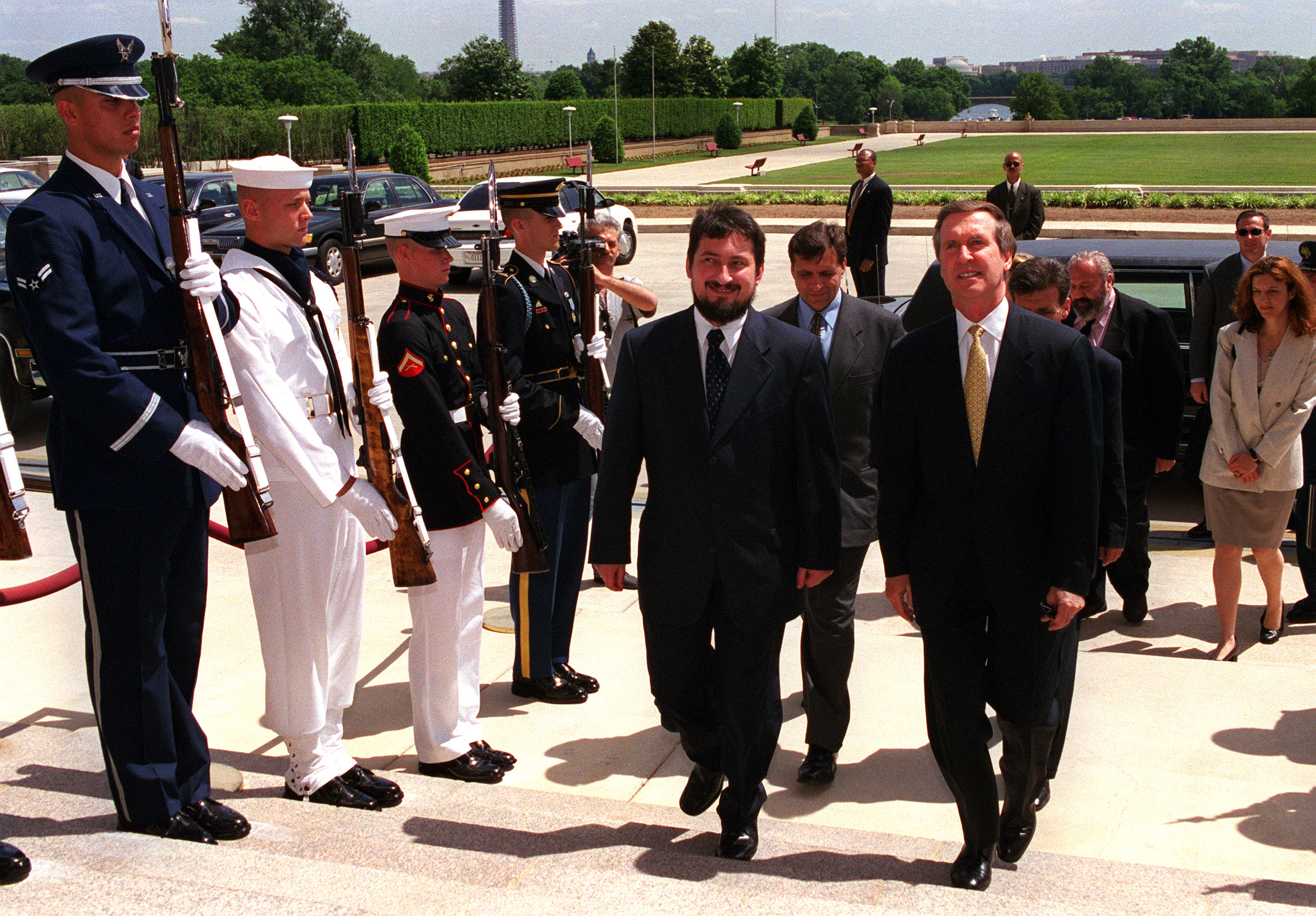

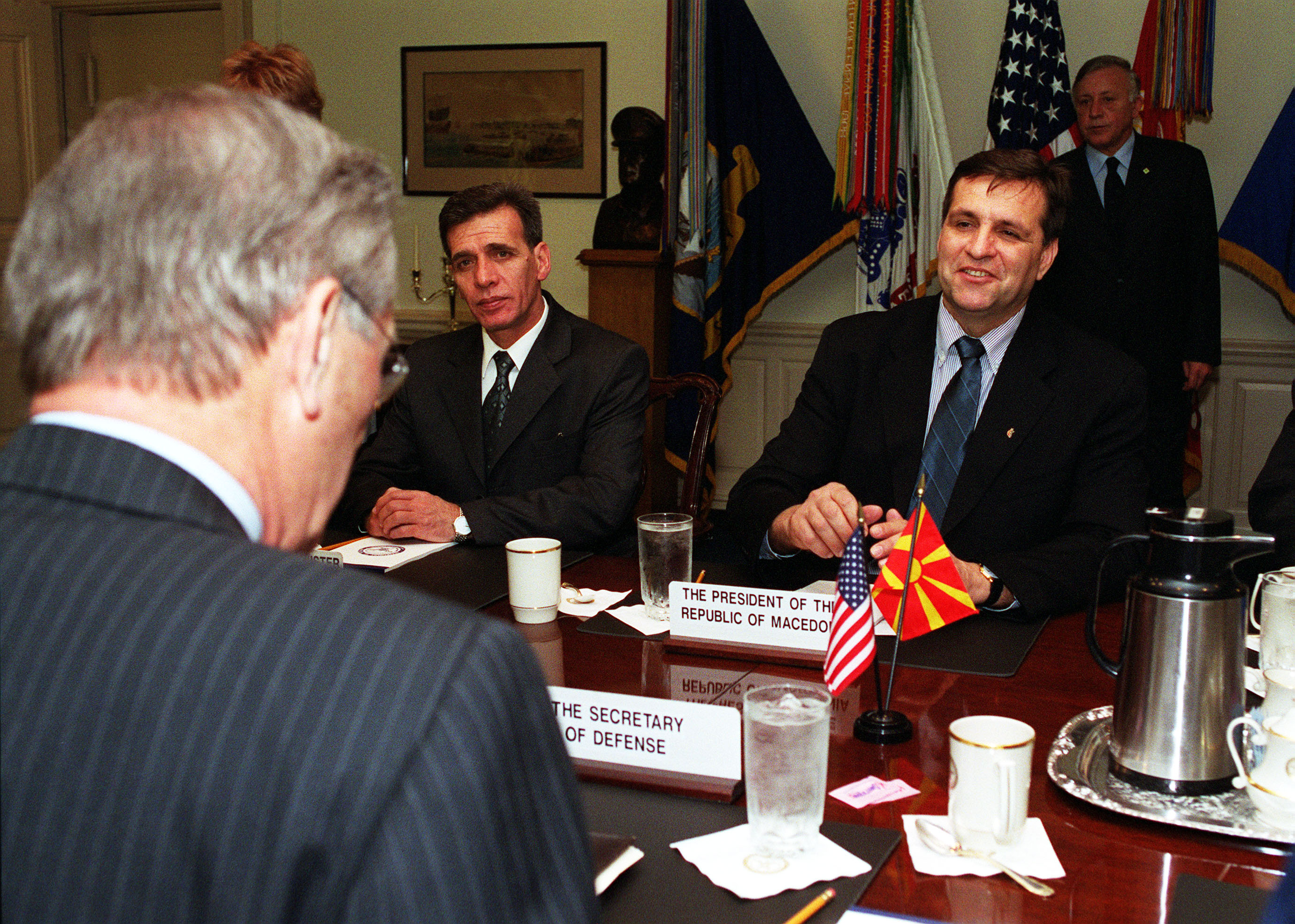

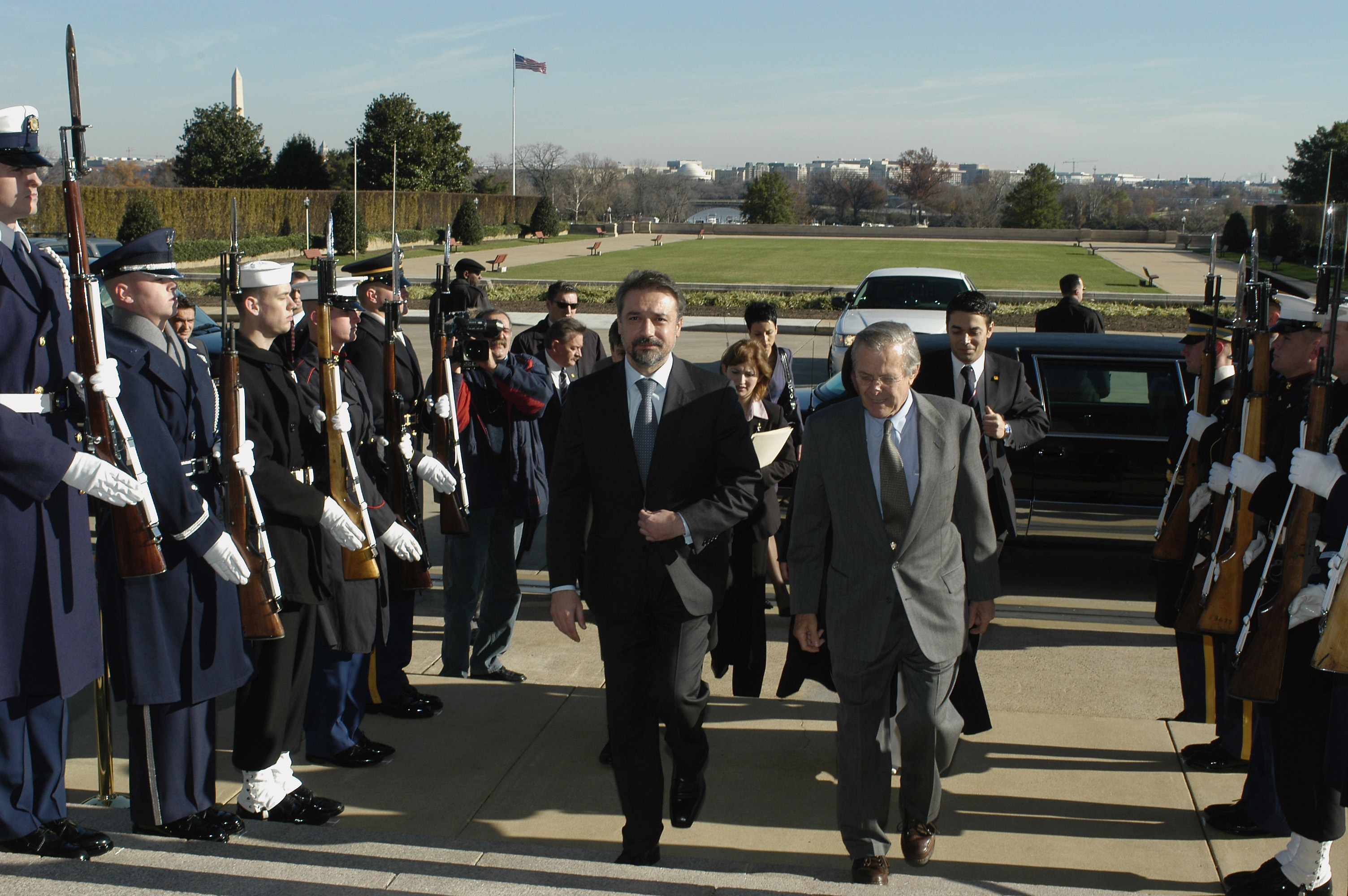

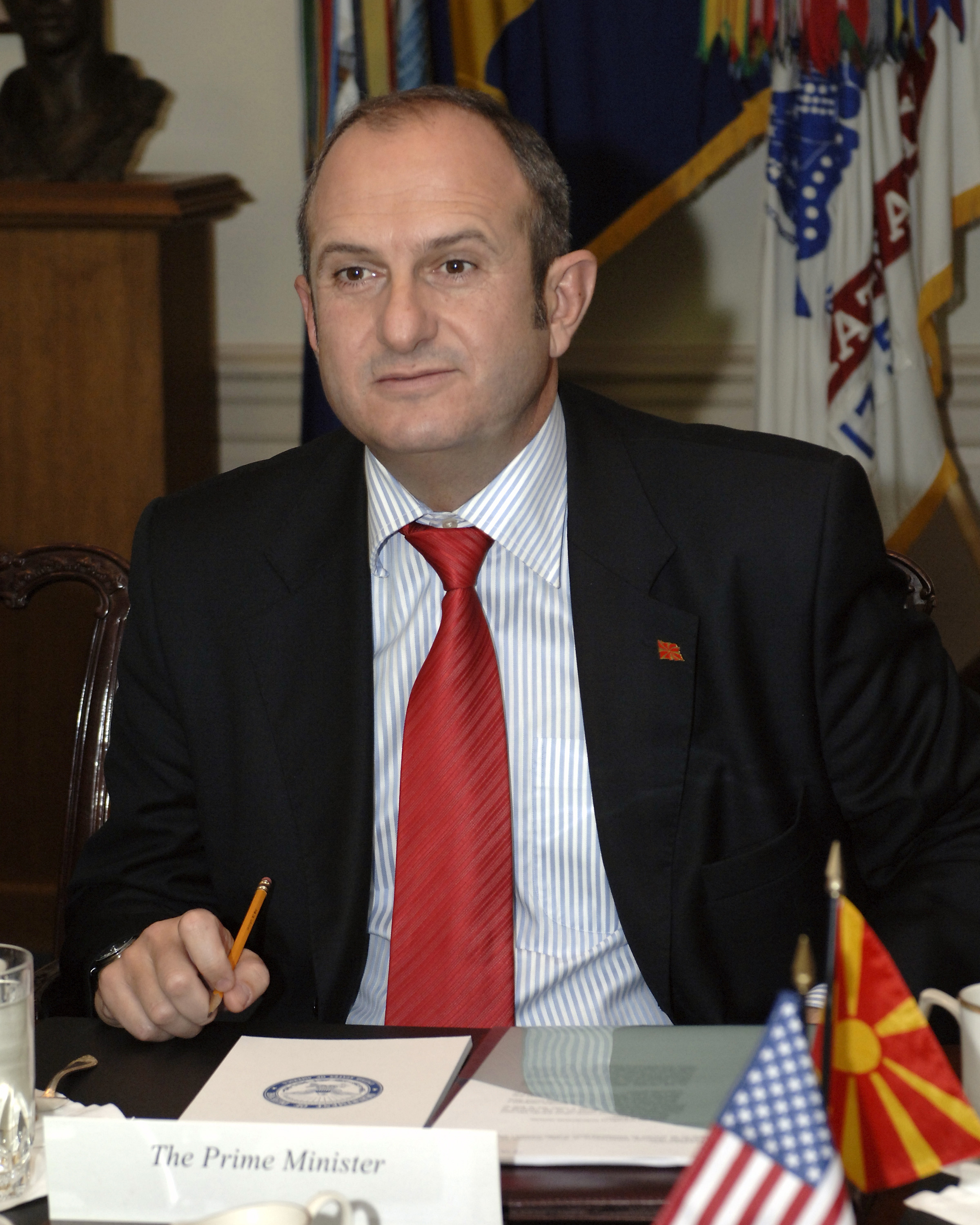

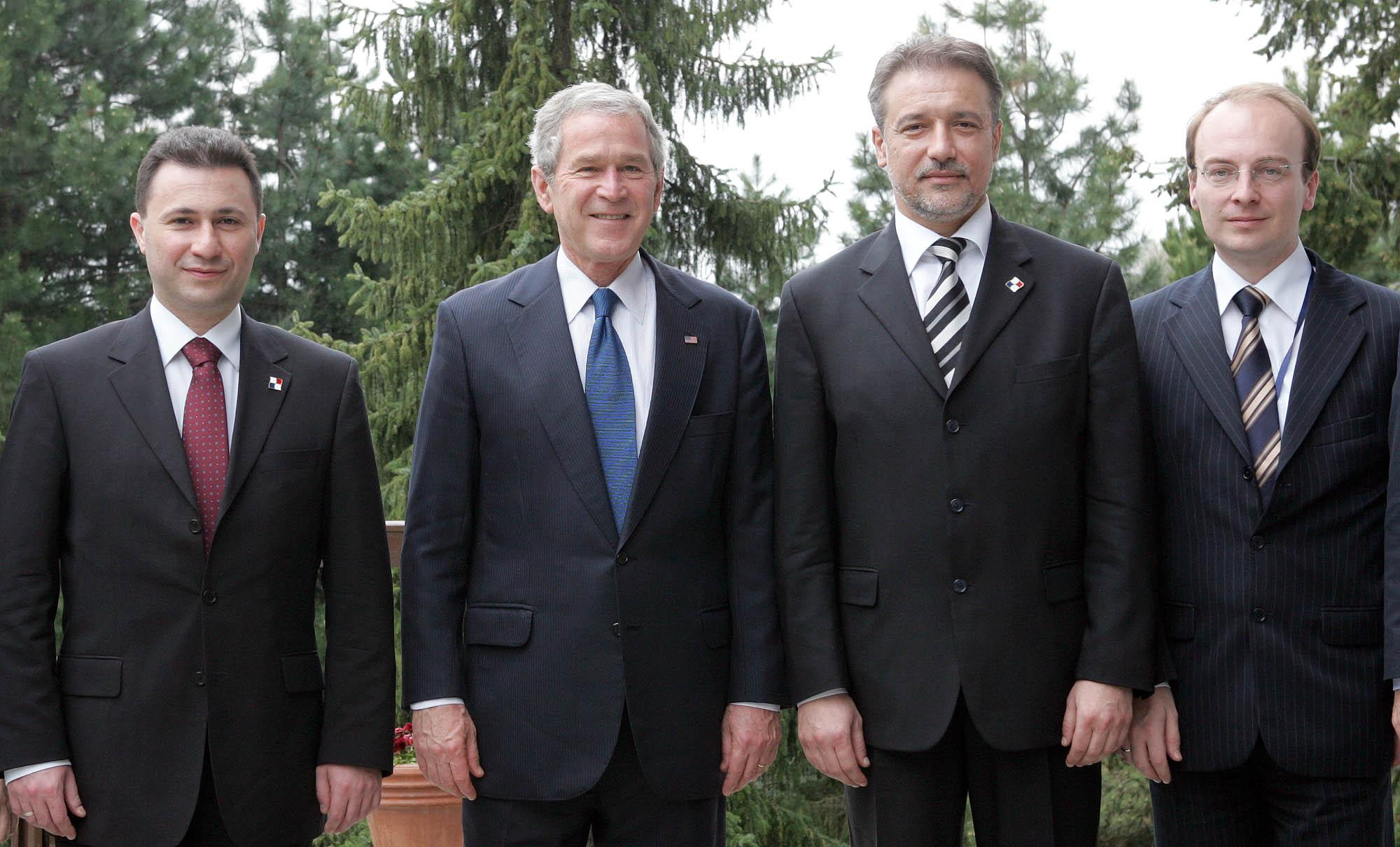

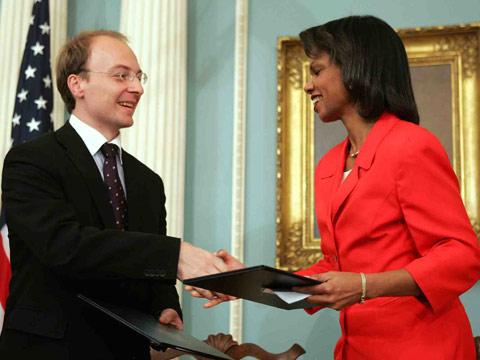

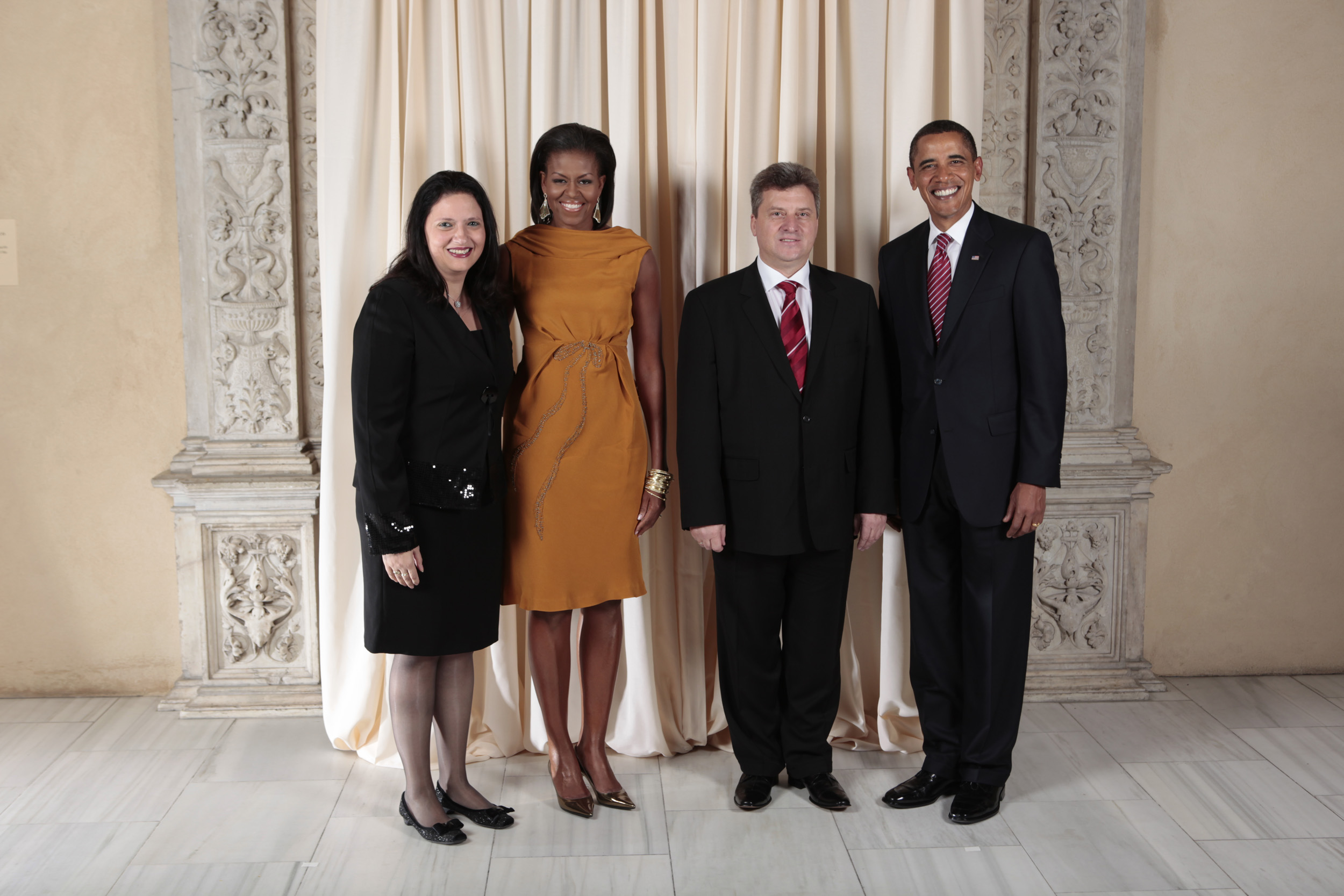

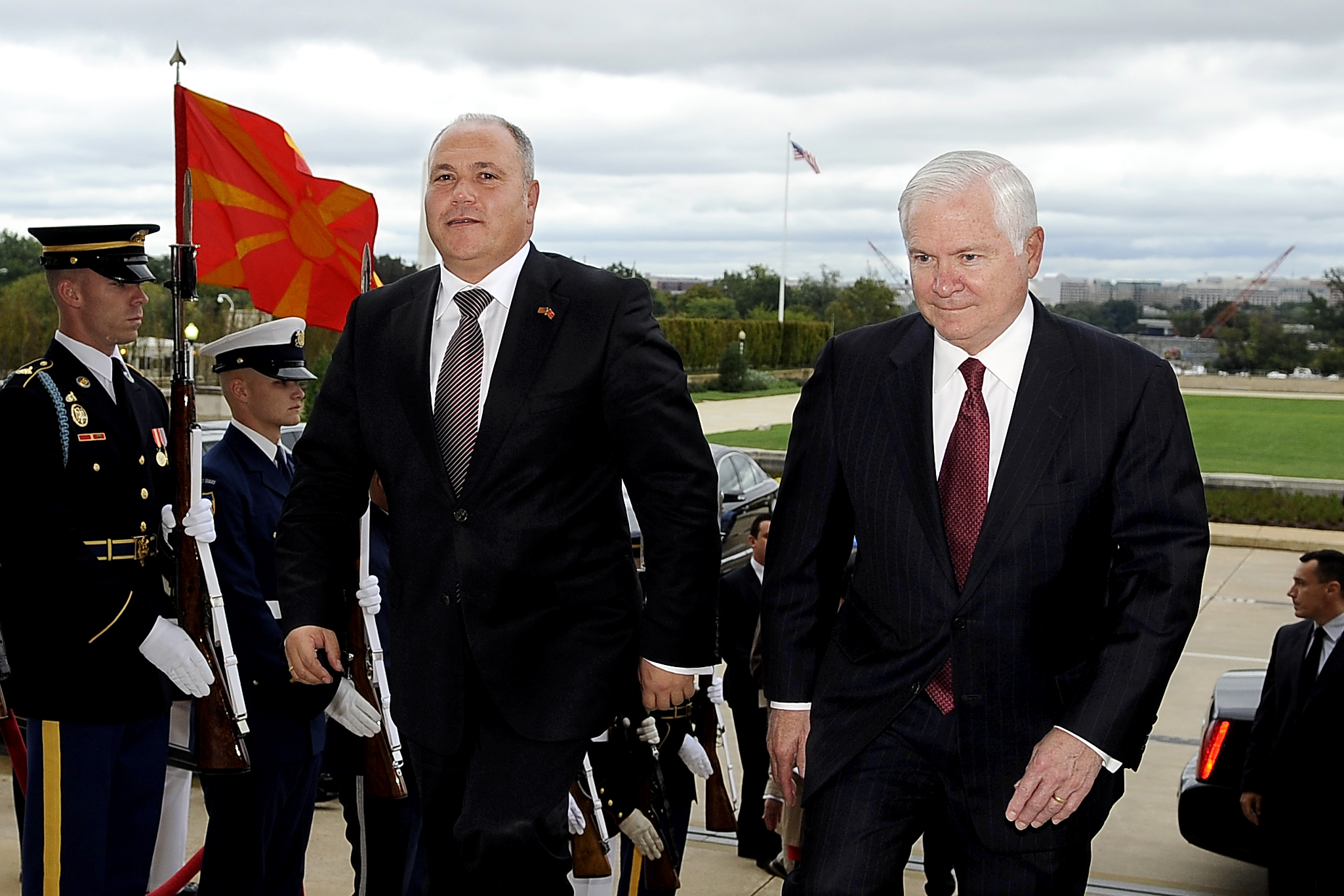

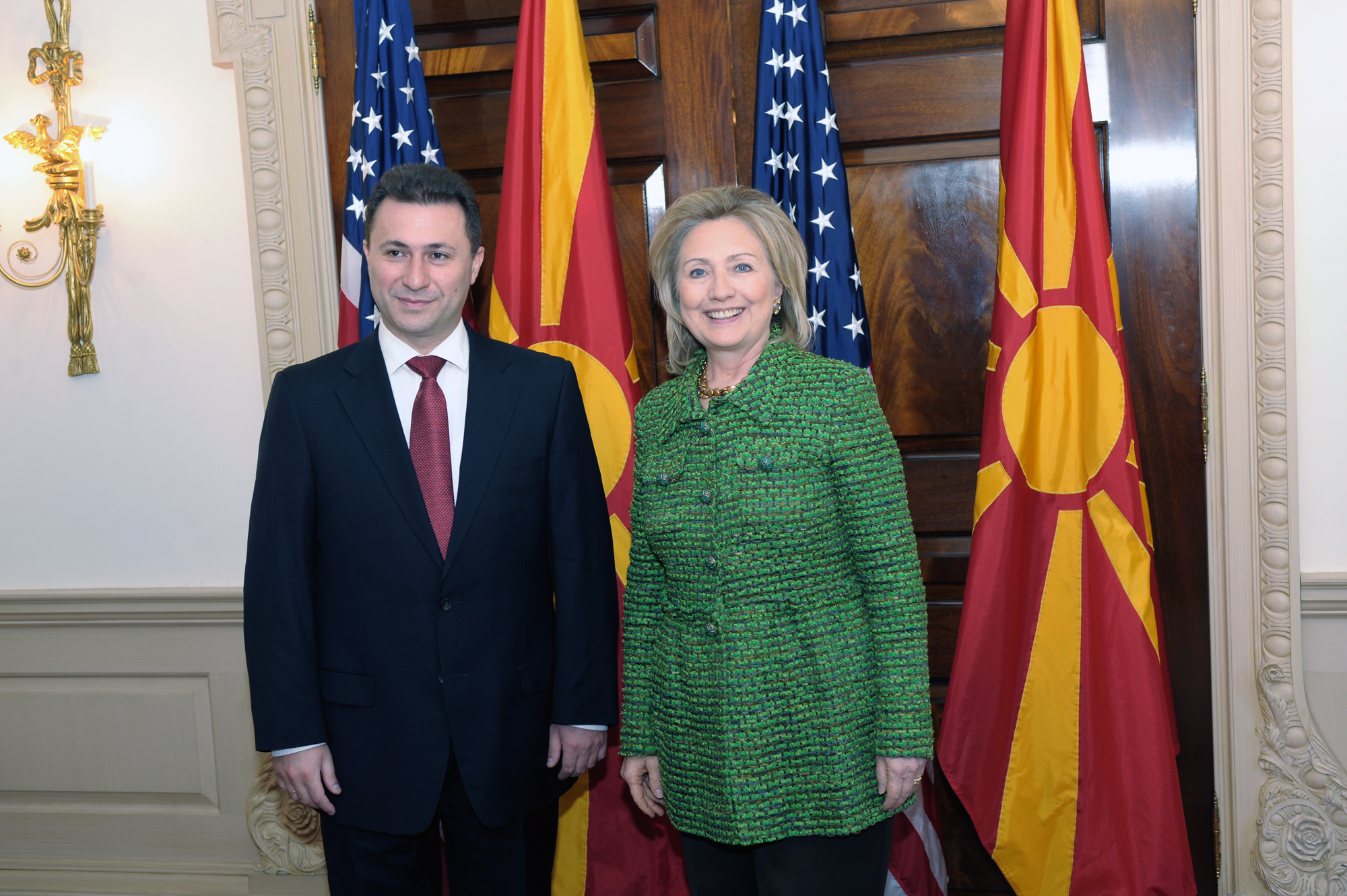

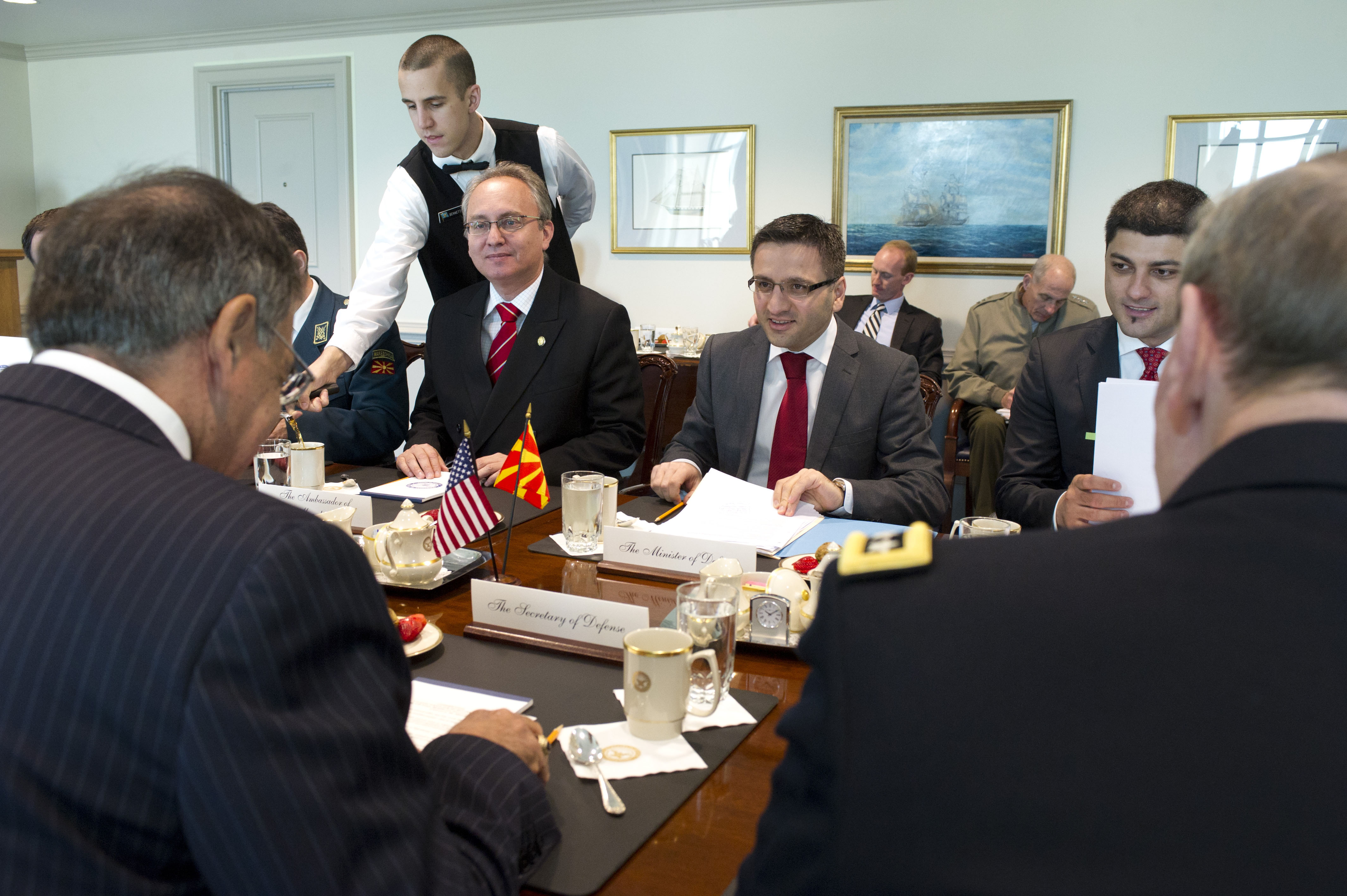

== Norway ==
Table of Trips
| Start | End | Guest | Title | Reason |
|---|---|---|---|---|
| May 25, 1951 | May 28, 1951 | Einar Gerhardsen | Prime Minister | In the U.S. May 15–29, visiting New York City and ethnic Norwegian communities in the Midwest and Far West. |
| September 22, 1952 | September 26, 1952 | Oscar Torp | Prime Minister | In U.S. September 10–30. Also visited New York City, Detroit, Duluth and Minneapolis, Chicago, and Madison. |
| November 23, 1954 | November 26, 1954 | Oscar Torp | Prime Minister | Arrived in U.S. November 16, aboard inaugural Trans-Arctic flight to Los Angeles by Scandinavian Airlines. Met with President Eisenhower November 24. |
| May 8, 1958 | May 14, 1958 | Einar Gerhardsen | Prime Minister | Unofficial visit; attended Minnesota Statehood Centennial in Minneapolis and St. Paul. |
| May 9, 1962 | May 11, 1962 | Einar Gerhardsen | Prime Minister | Presidential guest. In U.S. May 8–18, visiting Cape Canaveral and St. Augustine, and New York City. |
| April 25, 1968 | April 27, 1968 | Olav V | King | State visit. In U.S. April 24 – May 10; visited Williamsburg, Norfolk, Cape Kennedy, New Orleans, Los Angeles, San Francisco, Seattle, Minneapolis, Duluth, Madison, Chicago, and New York City. Private visit after May 2. |
| October 24, 1970 | October 24, 1970 | Per Borten | Prime Minister | Attended White House dinner on 25th Anniversary of the U.N. |
| September 21, 1971 | September 21, 1971 | Olav V | King | Private visit. |
| October 10, 1975 | October 10, 1975 | Olav V | King | Private visit. |
| May 30, 1978 | May 31, 1978 | Odvar Nordli | Prime Minister | Attended NATO summit conference. |
| June 10, 1979 | June 13, 1979 | Odvar Nordli | Prime Minister | Private visit. Met with President Carter |
| December 6, 1979 | 67.Dec.1979 | Odvar Nordli | Prime Minister | Private visit. Met with President Carter |
| October 17, 1982 | October 19, 1982 | Olav V | King | Private visit. Addressed U.N. General Assembly. Met with President Reagan October 18. |
| February 16, 1983 | February 18, 1983 | Kåre Willoch | Prime Minister | Official working visit. |
| September 23, 1984 | September 23, 1984 | Kåre Willoch | Prime Minister | Private visit. Met with President Reagan at U.N. General Assembly reception in New York City. |
| November 30, 1987 | November 30, 1987 | Olav V | King | Met with President Reagan during a private visit. |
| May 2, 1989 | May 5, 1989 | Gro Harlem Brundtland | Prime Minister | Met with President Bush during a private visit. |
| May 8, 1989 | May 8, 1989 | Olav V | King | Met with President Bush during a private visit. |
| February 23, 1990 | February 23, 1990 | Jan P. Syse | Prime Minister | Private visit. |
| September 24, 1991 | September 24, 1991 | Gro Harlem Brundtland | Prime Minister | Met with President Bush while attending the U.N. General Assembly in New York City. |
| June 5, 1992 | June 5, 1992 | Gro Harlem Brundtland | Prime Minister | Met with President Bush during a private visit. |
| May 16, 1994 | May 19, 1994 | Gro Harlem Brundtland | Prime Minister | Met with President Clinton during a private visit. |
| October 12, 1995 | October 17, 1995 | Harald V | King | Met with President Clinton during a private visit. |
| October 30, 1995 | October 31, 1995 | Harald V | King | Met with President Clinton during a private visit. |
| April 23, 1999 | April 25, 1999 | Kjell Magne Bondevik | Prime Minister | Attended NATO's 50th Anniversary Summit. |
| October 14, 1999 | October 15, 1999 | Kjell Magne Bondevik | Prime Minister | Working visit. |
| April 26, 2000 | April 28, 2000 | Harald V | King | Met with President Clinton during a private visit; dedicated an exhibit about the Vikings at the Smithsonian Institution. |
| December 3, 2001 | December 5, 2001 | Kjell Magne Bondevik | Prime Minister | Met with President Bush December 5 during a private visit. |
| May 16, 2003 | May 16, 2003 | Kjell Magne Bondevik | Prime Minister | Working visit. |
| March 6, 2005 | March 7, 2005 | Harald V | King | Working visit. |
| April 12, 2010 | April 13, 2010 | Jens Stoltenberg | Prime Minister | Attended the Nuclear Security Summit. |
| October 20, 2011 | October 20, 2011 | Jens Stoltenberg | Prime Minister | Working visit. |
| May 20, 2012 | May 21, 2012 | Jens Stoltenberg | Prime Minister | Attended the NATO Summit meeting in Chicago. |
| March 31, 2016 | April 1, 2016 | Erna Solberg | Prime Minister | Attended the Nuclear Security Summit. |
| May 13, 2016 | May 13, 2016 | Erna Solberg | Prime Minister | Attended the U.S.- Nordic Leaders Summit. |
| January 9, 2018 | January 10, 2018 | Erna Solberg | Prime Minister | Working Visit. |
| January 27, 2022 | January 27, 2022 | Jonas Gahr Støre | Prime Minister | Met with President Biden during an Official Working visit. |
| July 10, 2024 | July 11, 2024 | Jonas Gahr Støre | Prime Minister | Attended NATO 75th Anniversary Summit in Washington, D.C. |
| April 25, 2025 | April 25, 2025 | Jonas Gahr Støre | Prime Minister | Working Visit. |

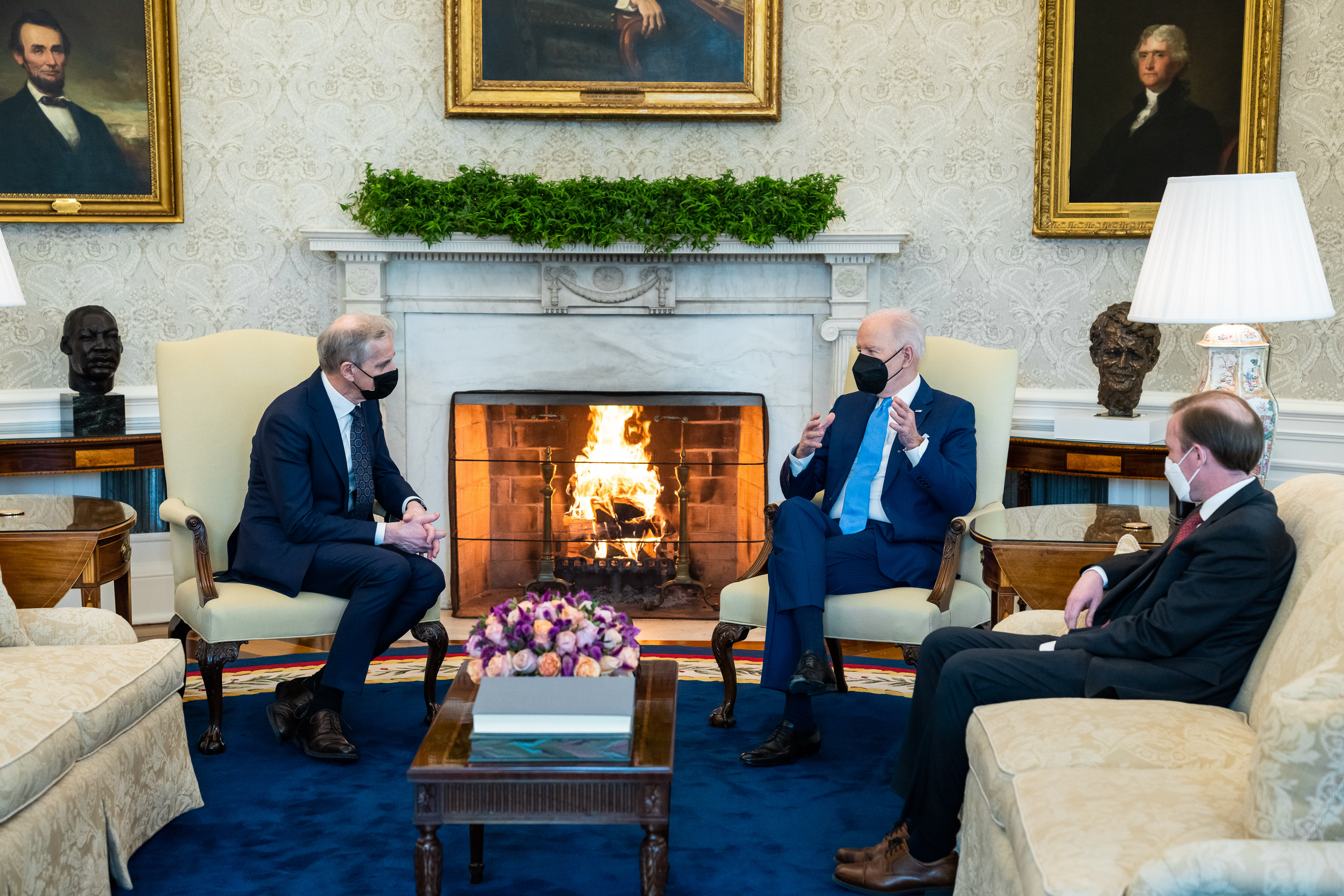

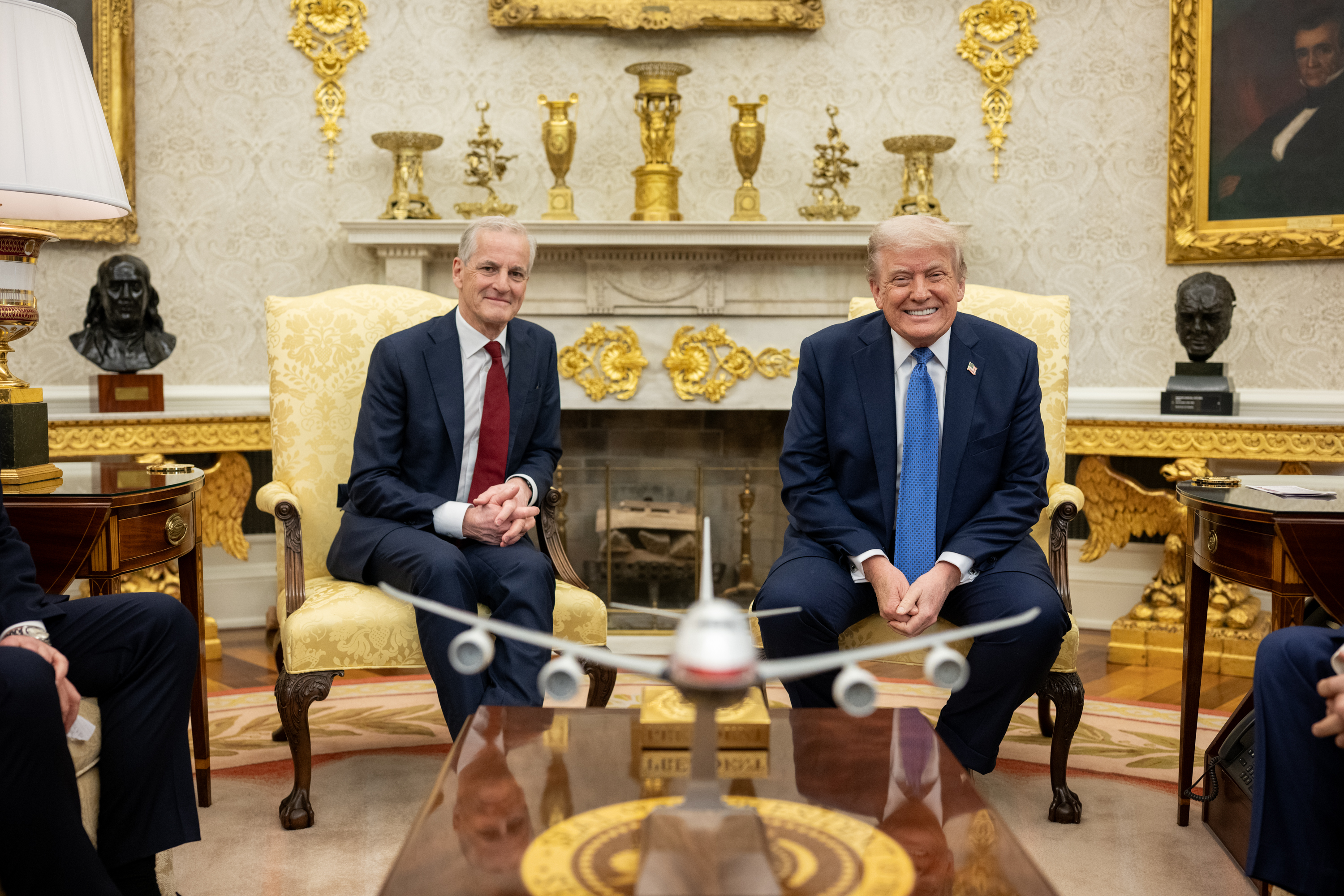

== Poland ==
Table of Trips
| Start | End | Guest | Title | Reason |
|---|---|---|---|---|
| April 6, 1941 | April 10, 1941 | Władysław Sikorski | Prime Minister (government-in-exile) | To establish political contacts. Also visited New York City, Palm Beach, and Chicago. |
| March 23, 1942 | March 30, 1942 | Władysław Sikorski | Prime Minister (government-in-exile) | Met with U.S. officials; also visited New York City. |
| December 2, 1942 | December 3, 1942 | Władysław Sikorski | Prime Minister (government-in-exile) | At invitation of the President. Afterwards visited New York City. Departed for Mexico December 26. |
| December 2, 1942 | December 3, 1942 | Władysław Sikorski | Prime Minister (government-in-exile) | Also visited New York City. Departed U.S. January 10. |
| June 5, 1944 | June 14, 1944 | Stanisław Mikołajczyk | Prime Minister (government-in-exile) | Courtesy visit. Discussed Polish-Soviet relations with President Roosevelt. |
| October 8, 1974 | October 10, 1974 | Edward Gierek | First Secretary | Official visit. In U.S. October 6–13; visited Williamsburg, New York City |
| March 20, 1990 | March 23, 1990 | Tadeusz Mazowiecki | Prime Minister | Official visit. Private visit to Chicago afterwards. |
| September 29, 1990 | September 29, 1990 | Tadeusz Mazowiecki | Prime Minister | Met with President Bush at the U.N. General Assembly. |
| March 19, 1991 | March 22, 1991 | Lech Wałęsa | President | State Visit. Afterwards visited Los Angeles, Chicago, and New York City. |
| September 11, 1991 | September 11, 1991 | Jan Krzysztof Bielecki | Prime Minister | Met with President Bush during a private visit. |
| April 13, 1992 | April 14, 1992 | Jan Krzysztof Bielecki | Prime Minister | Met with President Bush during a private visit. |
| April 20, 1993 | April 22, 1993 | Lech Wałęsa | President | Attended dedication of the Holocaust Memorial Museum and met with President Clinton on April 21. |
| July 9, 1996 | July 10, 1996 | Aleksander Kwaśniewski | President | Working visit. |
| July 8, 1998 | July 10, 1998 | Jerzy Buzek | Prime Minister | Met with President Clinton during a private visit. |
| April 23, 1999 | April 25, 1999 | Aleksander Kwaśniewski | President | Attended NATO's 50th Anniversary Summit. |
| April 23, 1999 | April 25, 1999 | Jerzy Buzek | Prime Minister | Attended NATO's 50th Anniversary Summit. |
| January 10, 2002 | January 11, 2002 | Leszek Miller | Prime Minister | Working visit. |
| July 17, 2002 | July 18, 2002 | Aleksander Kwaśniewski | President | State Visit. Also visited Troy. |
| January 12, 2003 | January 14, 2003 | Aleksander Kwaśniewski | President | Working visit. |
| February 4, 2003 | February 7, 2003 | Leszek Miller | Prime Minister | Working visit. |
| January 26, 2004 | January 27, 2004 | Aleksander Kwaśniewski | President | Working visit. |
| August 7, 2004 | August 7, 2004 | Marek Belka | Prime Minister | Working visit. |
| February 8, 2005 | February 9, 2005 | Aleksander Kwaśniewski | President | Working visit. |
| October 12, 2005 | October 12, 2005 | Aleksander Kwaśniewski | President | Working visit. |
| February 8, 2006 | February 10, 2006 | Lech Kaczyński | President | Working visit. |
| September 13, 2006 | September 15, 2006 | Jarosław Kaczyński | Prime Minister | Working visit. |
| July 15, 2007 | July 17, 2007 | Lech Kaczyński | President | Working visit. |
| March 9, 2008 | March 10, 2008 | Donald Tusk | Prime Minister | Working visit. |
| December 8, 2010 | December 8, 2010 | Bronisław Komorowski | President | Working visit. |
| May 20, 2012 | May 21, 2012 | Bronisław Komorowski | President | Attended the NATO Summit meeting in Chicago. |
| March 31, 2016 | April 1, 2016 | Andrzej Duda | President | Attended the Nuclear Security Summit. |
| September 17, 2018 | September 18, 2018 | Andrzej Duda | President | Official Working visit. |
| December 5, 2018 | December 5, 2018 | Andrzej Duda | President | Attended the funeral of Former President Bush |
| June 11, 2019 | June 12, 2019 | Andrzej Duda | President | Official Working visit. |
| June 24, 2020 | June 24, 2020 | Andrzej Duda | President | Working visit. |
| April 11, 2023 | April 13, 2023 | Mateusz Morawiecki | Prime Minister | Went to Washington, D.C. |
| March 12, 2024 | March 12, 2024 | Andrzej Duda | President | Working Visit. |
| March 12, 2024 | March 12, 2024 | Donald Tusk | Prime Minister | Working Visit. |
| July 10, 2024 | July 11, 2024 | Andrzej Duda | President | Attended NATO 75th Anniversary Summit in Washington, D.C. |
| September 3, 2025 | September 3, 2025 | Karol Nawrocki | President | Official Working visit. |

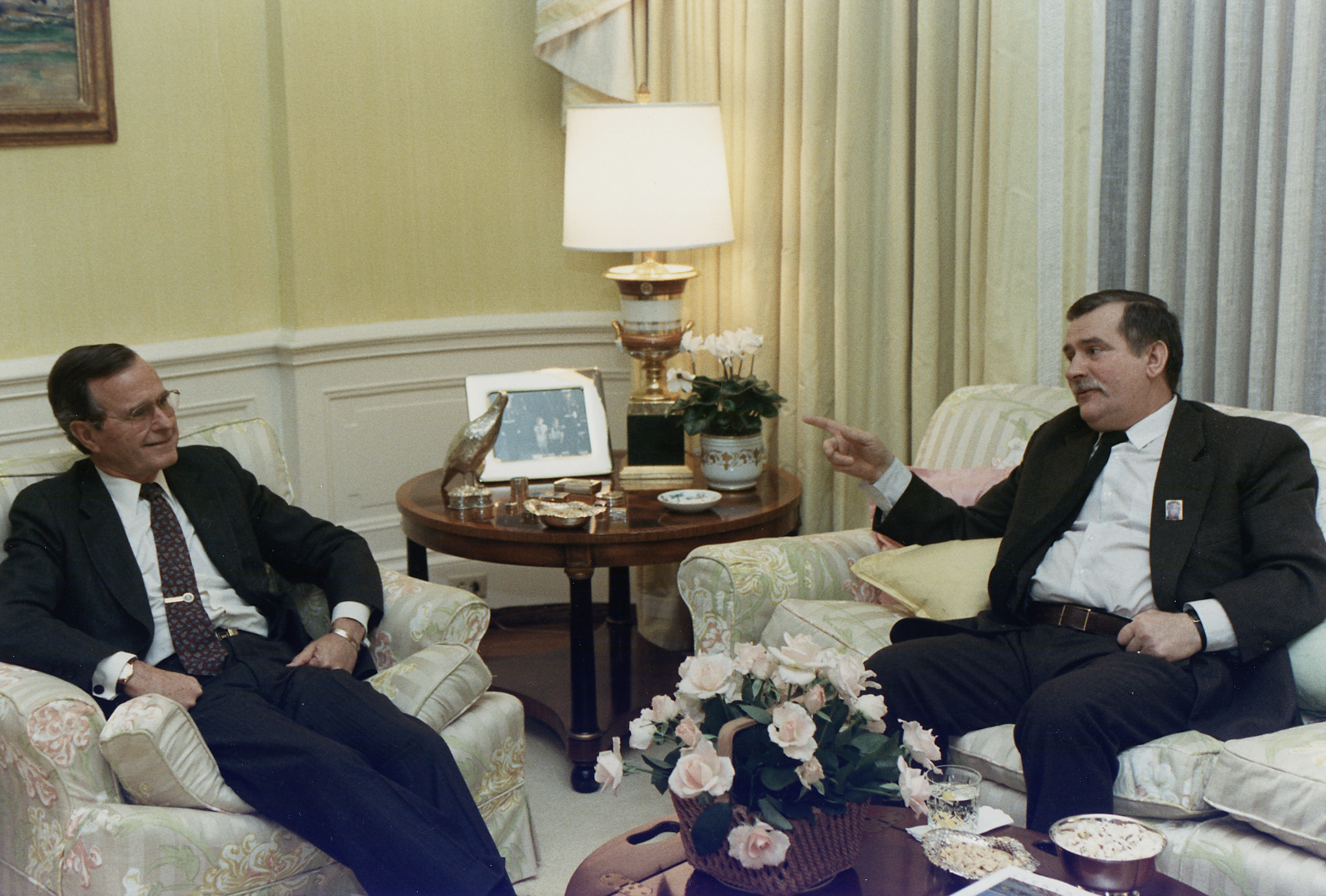

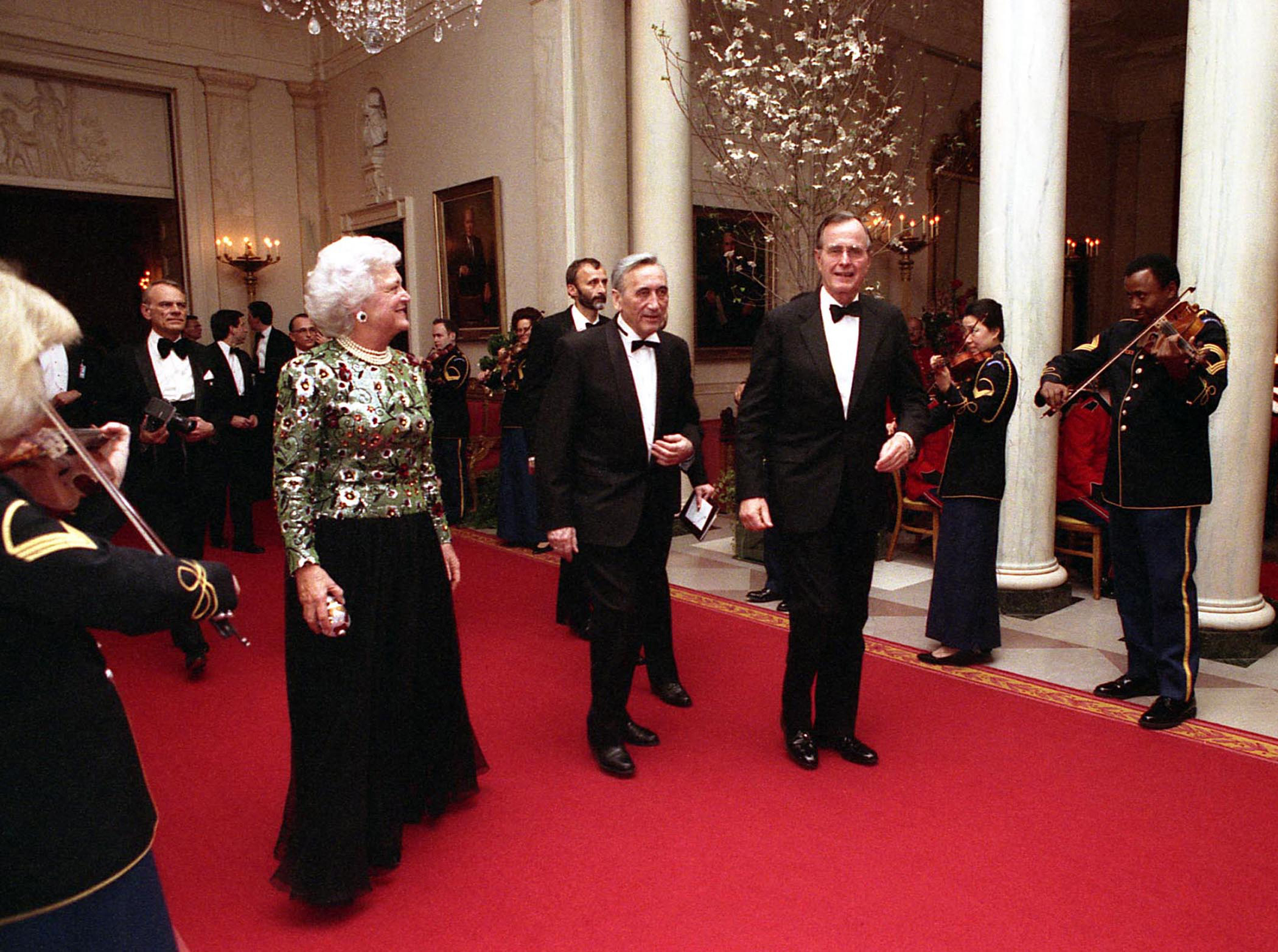

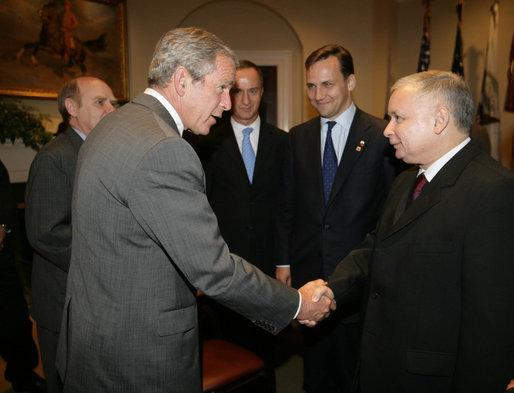

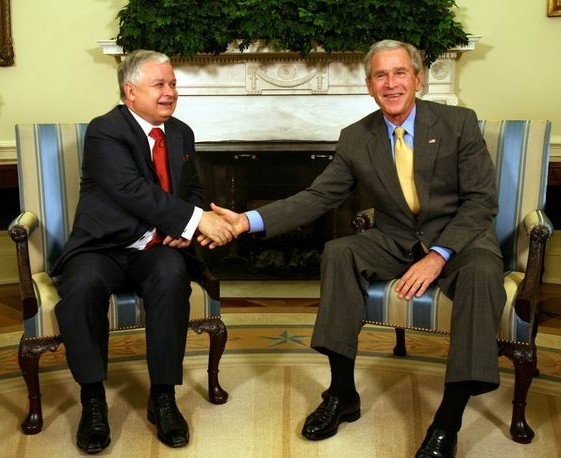

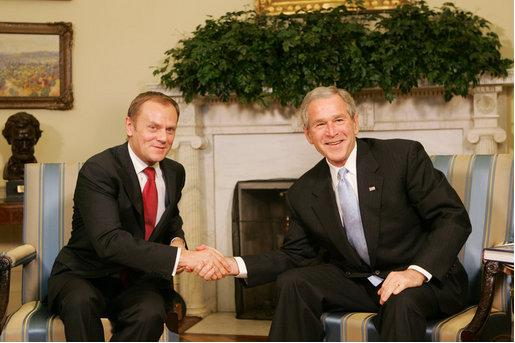

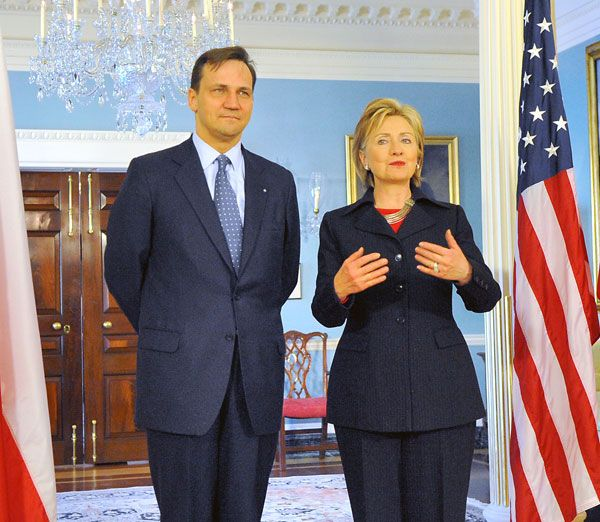

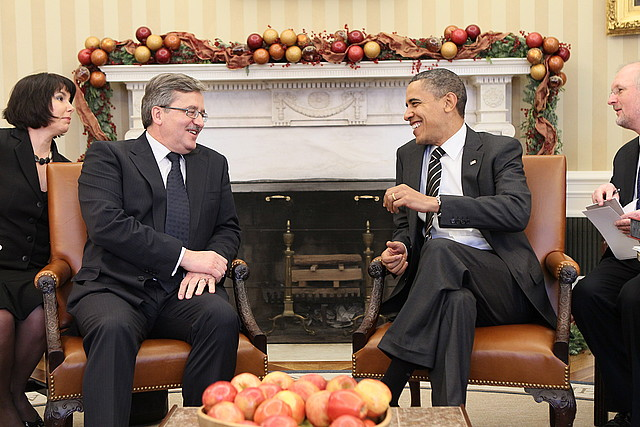

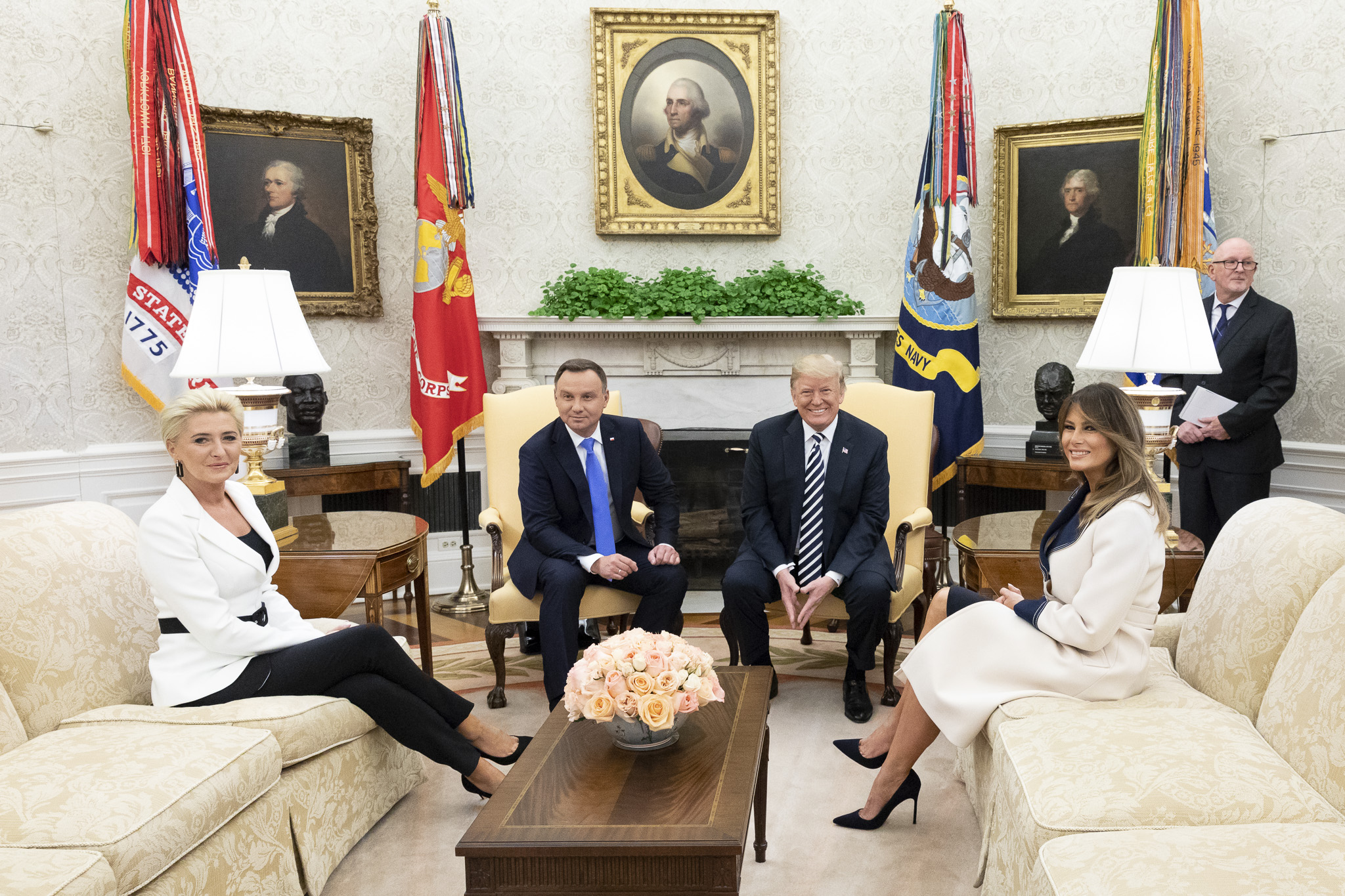

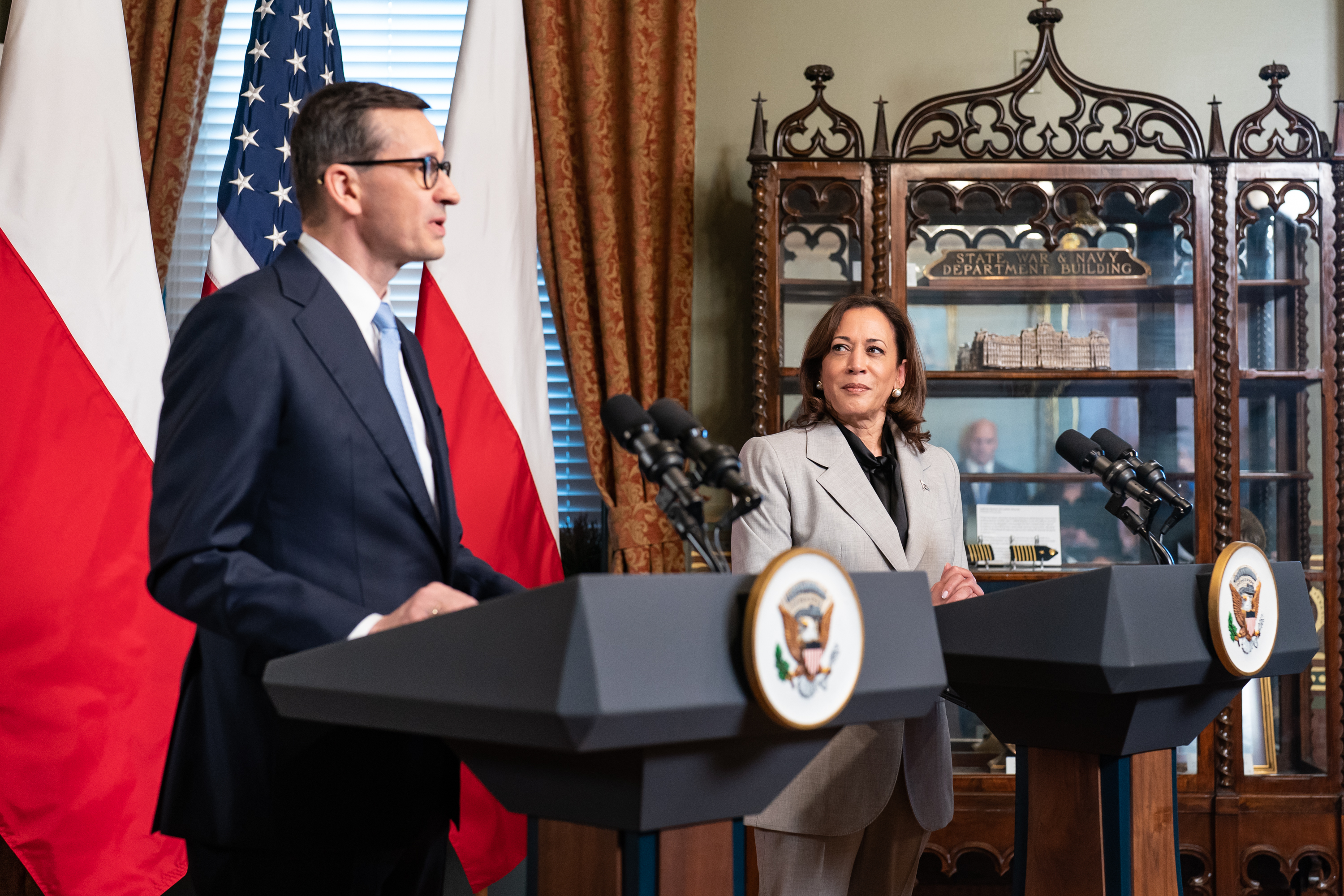

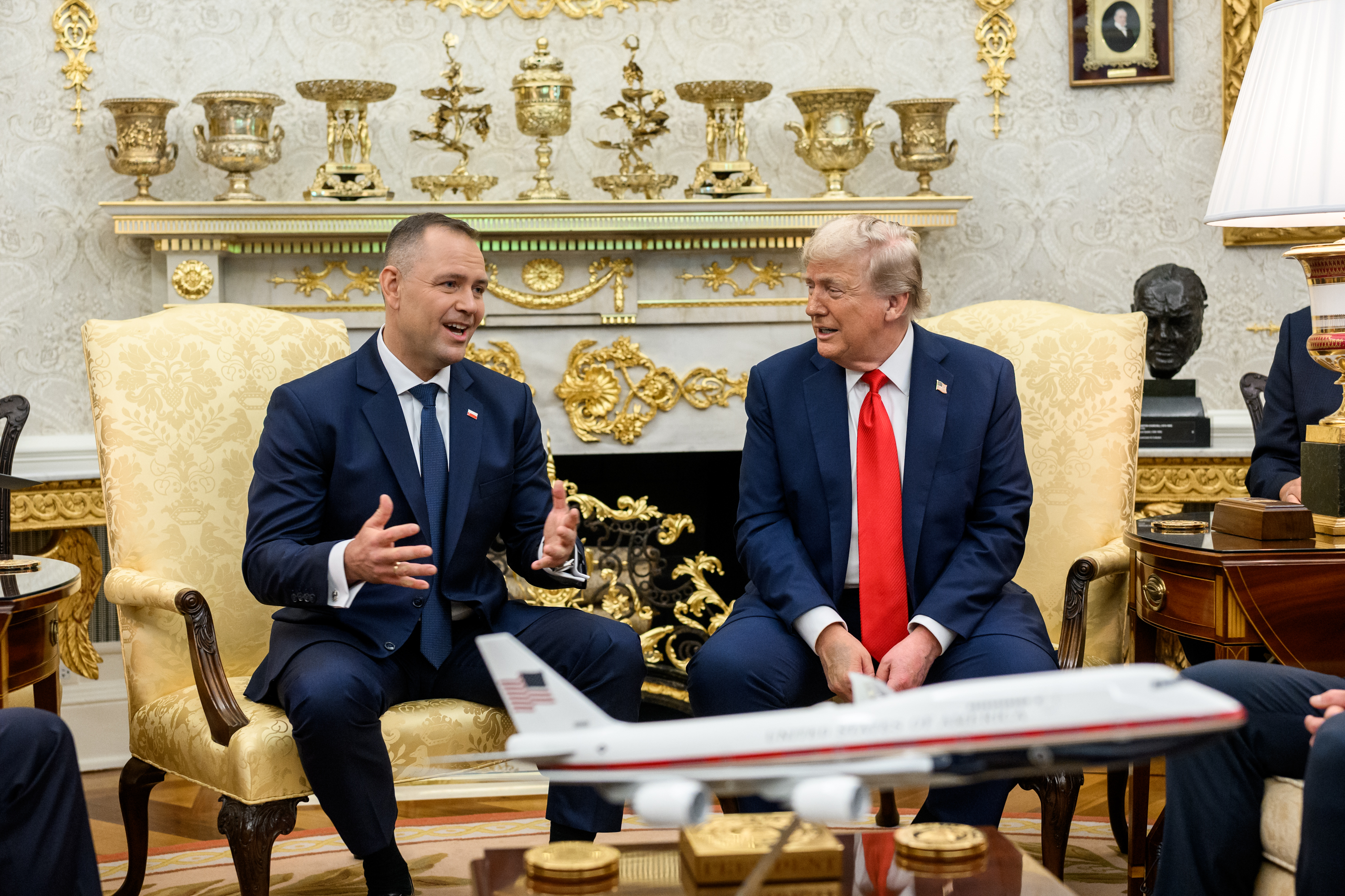

== Portugal ==
Table of Trips
| Start | End | Guest | Title | Reason |
|---|---|---|---|---|
| March 31, 1969 | April 1, 1969 | Marcelo Caetano | Prime Minister | Attended funeral of former President Eisenhower; met with President Nixon April 1. |
| October 18, 1974 | October 18, 1974 | Francisco da Costa Gomes | President | Private visit. |
| April 21, 1977 | April 21, 1977 | Mário Soares | Prime Minister | Private visit. |
| May 30, 1978 | May 31, 1978 | António Ramalho Eanes | President | Attended NATO Summit conference. |
| December 14, 1982 | December 16, 1982 | Francisco Pinto Balsemão | Prime Minister | Official working visit. |
| September 14, 1983 | September 17, 1983 | António Ramalho Eanes | President | State visit; visited New York City. Departed the U.S. September 20. |
| March 13, 1984 | March 16, 1984 | Mário Soares | Prime Minister | Official working visit. Private visit to New York City afterwards. |
| September 7, 1986 | September 9, 1986 | Aníbal Cavaco Silva | Prime Minister | Private Visit. Met with President Reagan |
| May 17, 1987 | May 20, 1987 | Mário Soares | Prime Minister | Private Visit. Met with President Reagan |
| February 23, 1988 | February 25, 1988 | Aníbal Cavaco Silva | Prime Minister | Official Working Visit. |
| June 26, 1989 | June 26, 1989 | Mário Soares | President | Met with President Bush during a private visit. |
| January 10, 1990 | January 12, 1990 | Aníbal Cavaco Silva | Prime Minister | Official working visit. Private visit to New York City afterward. |
| September 25, 1990 | September 25, 1990 | Aníbal Cavaco Silva | Prime Minister | Met with President Bush during a private visit. |
| January 10, 1992 | January 13, 1992 | Mário Soares | President | Private visit. Met with President Bush Jan. 13; afterwards visited New York City |
| April 21, 1992 | April 23, 1992 | Aníbal Cavaco Silva | Prime Minister | Took part in U.S.-European Community meeting. |
| April 20, 1993 | April 22, 1993 | Mário Soares | President | Attended dedication of the Holocaust Memorial Museum and met with President Clinton on April 21. |
| October 11, 1994 | October 13, 1994 | Aníbal Cavaco Silva | Prime Minister | Working visit. |
| April 2, 1997 | April 4, 1997 | António Guterres | Prime Minister | Official working visit. |
| September 10, 2002 | September 10, 2002 | José Manuel Durão Barroso | Prime Minister | Working visit. |
| June 5, 2003 | June 6, 2003 | José Manuel Durão Barroso | Prime Minister | Working visit. |
| September 16, 2007 | September 17, 2007 | José Sócrates | Prime Minister | Was visiting as head of the EU Presidency. |
| November 9, 2011 | November 9, 2011 | Aníbal Cavaco Silva | President | Working visit. |
| May 20, 2012 | May 21, 2012 | Pedro Passos Coelho | Prime Minister | Attended the NATO Summit Meeting in Chicago |
| June 26, 2018 | June 27, 2018 | Marcelo Rebelo de Sousa | President | Working visit. |
| July 10, 2024 | July 11, 2024 | Luis Montenegro | Prime Minister | Attended NATO 75th Anniversary Summit in Washington, D.C. |

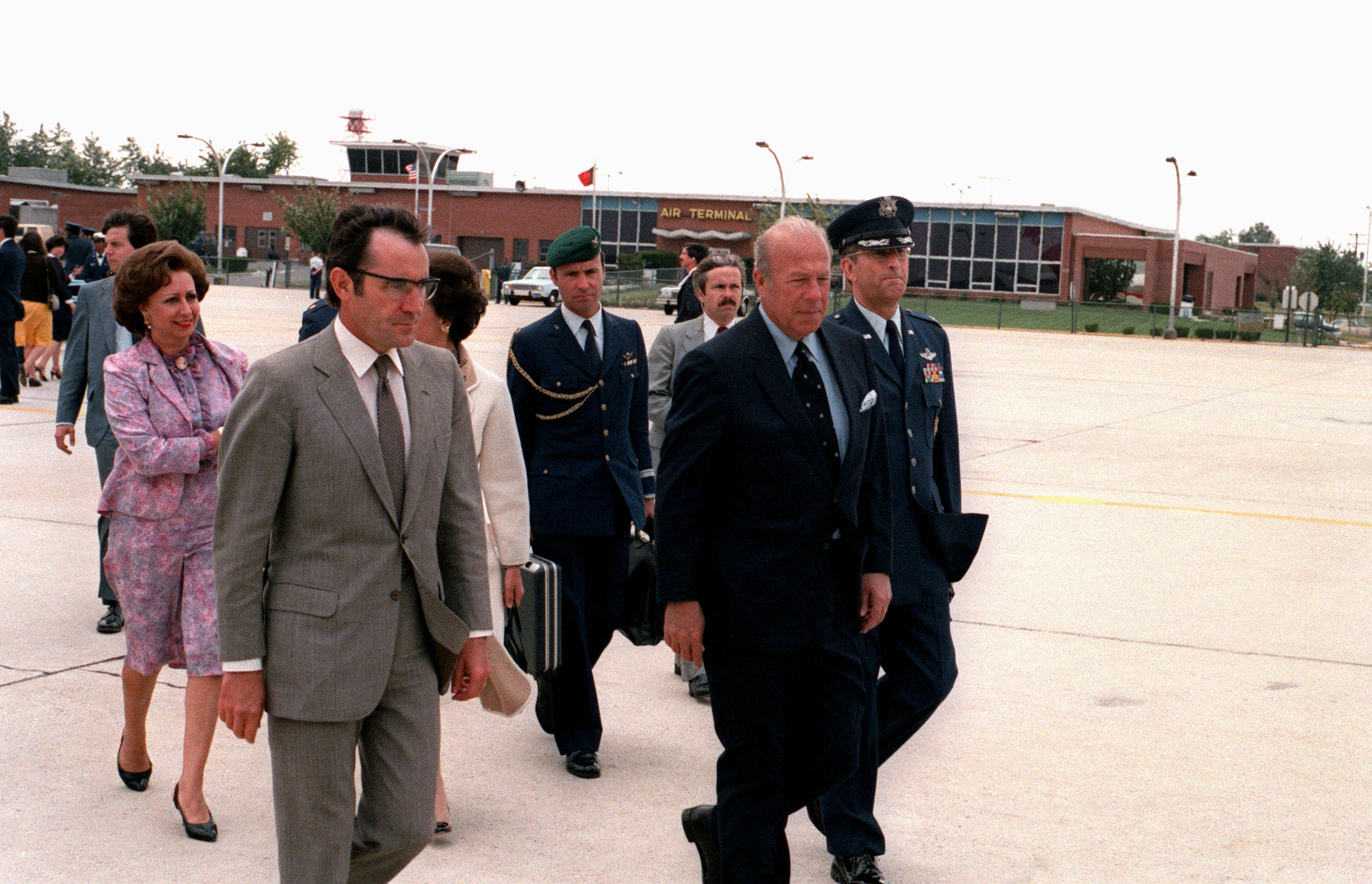

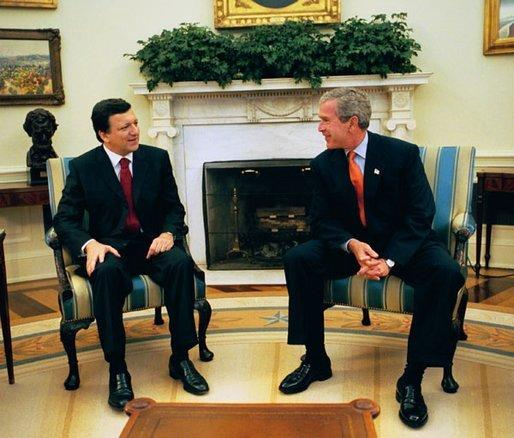

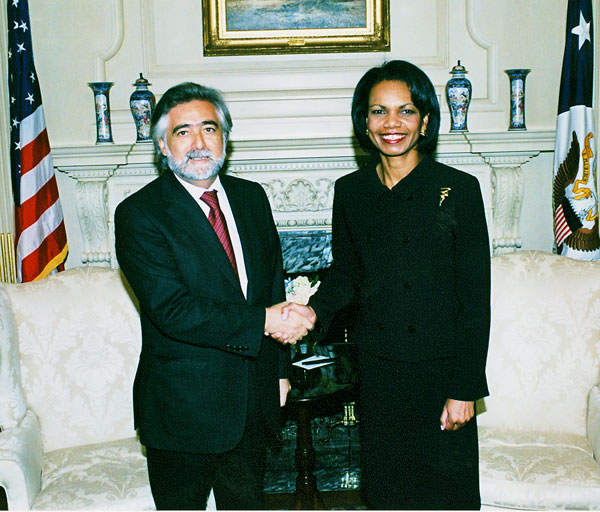

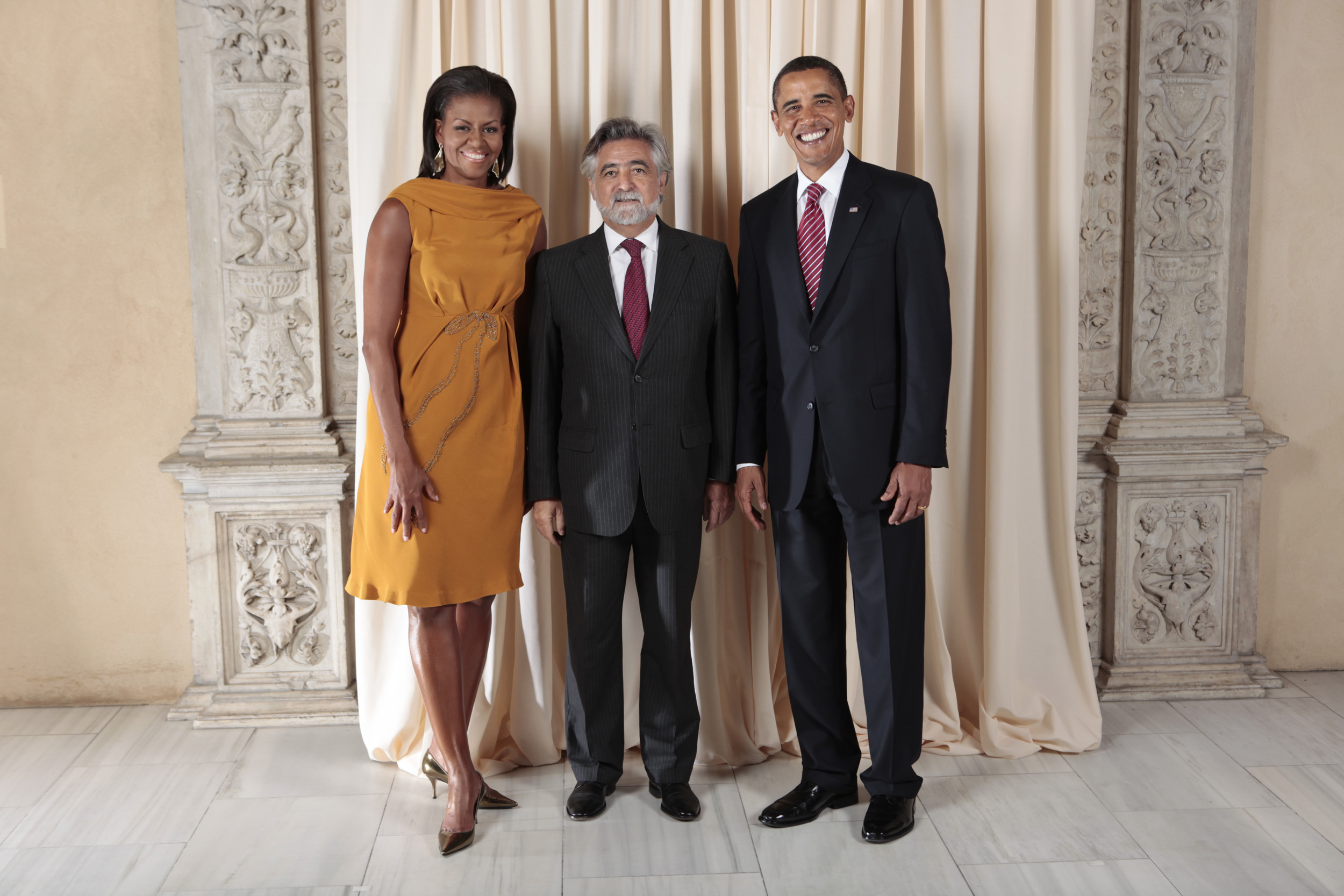

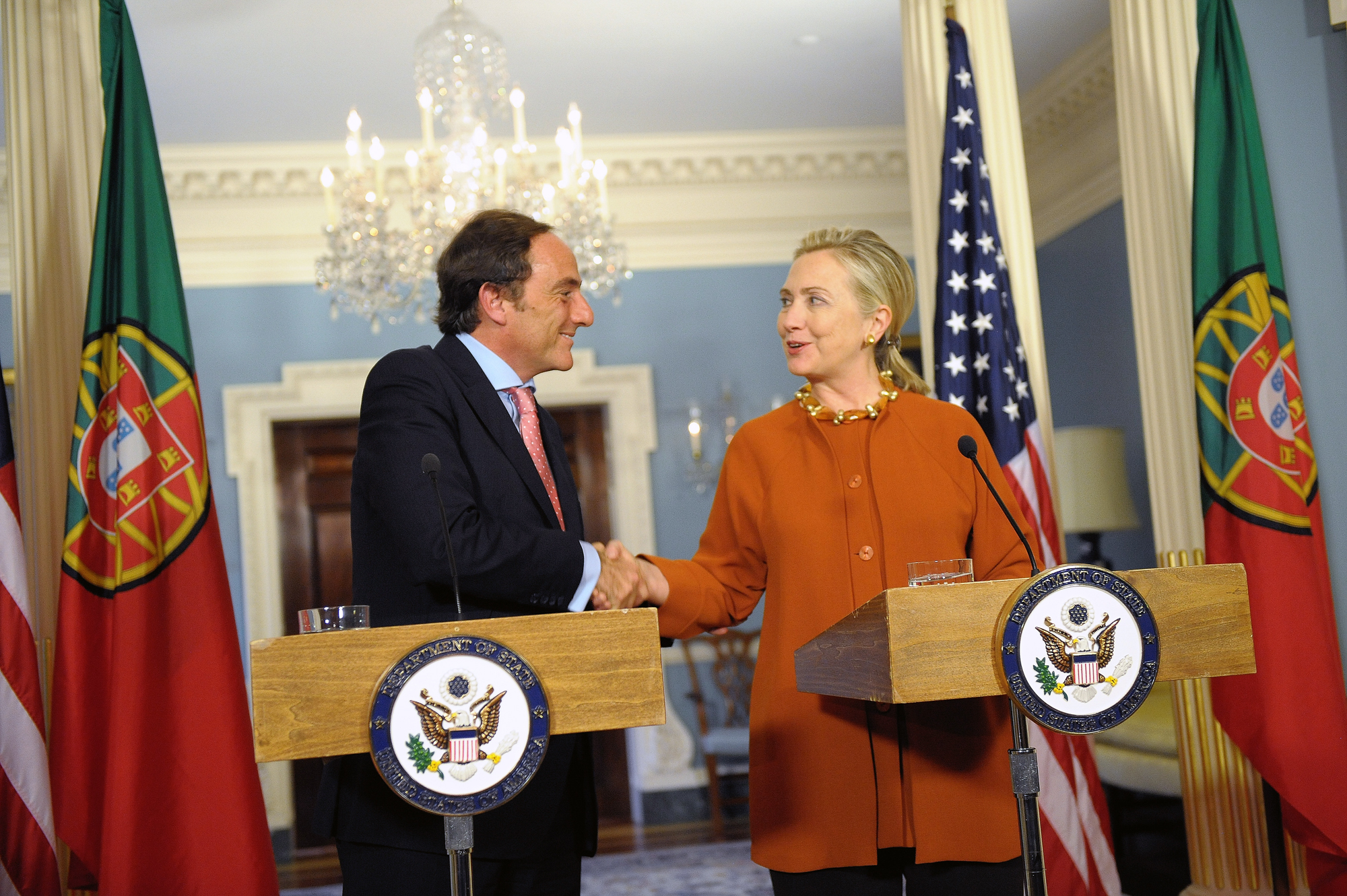

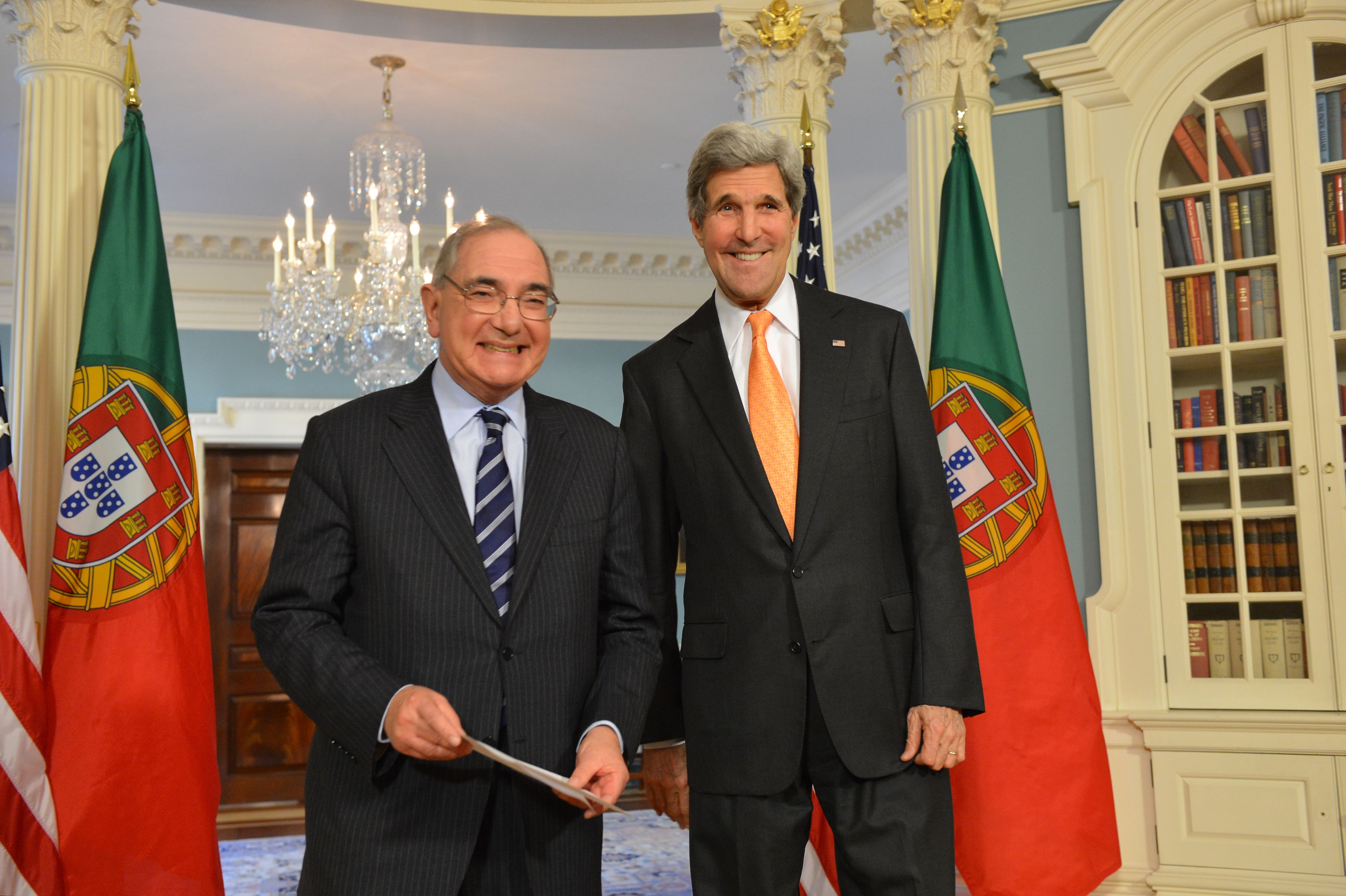

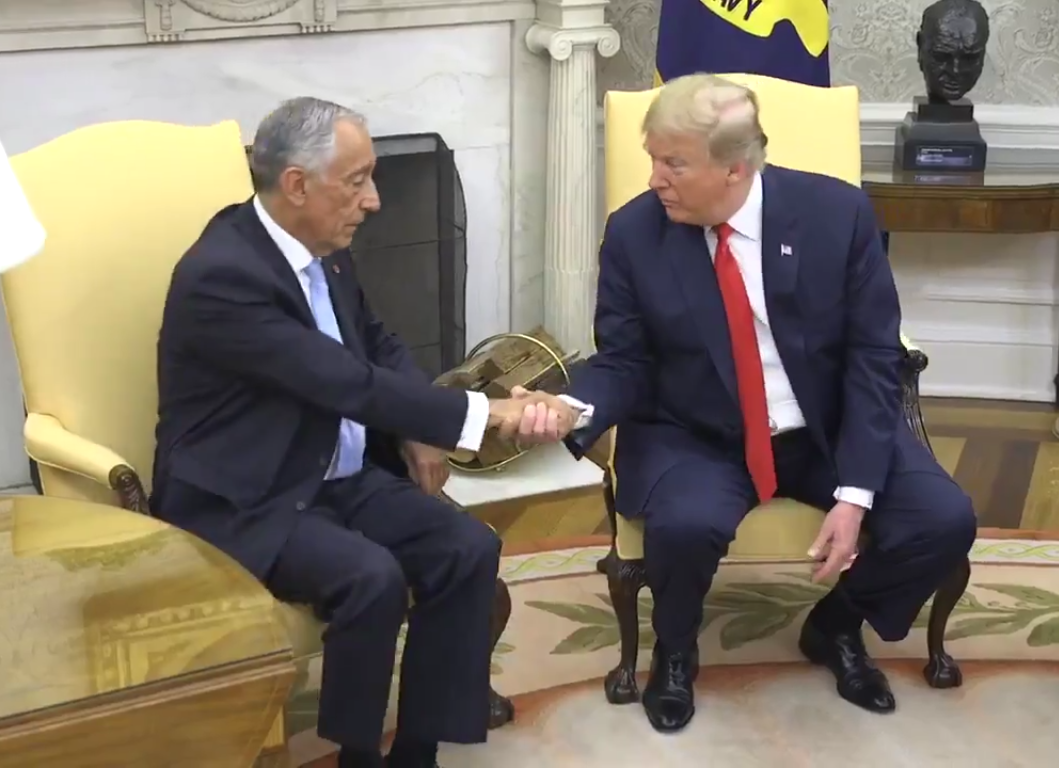

== Romania ==
Table of Trips
| Start | End | Guest | Title | Reason |
|---|---|---|---|---|
| October 18, 1926 | November 24, 1926 | Queen Marie of Romania | Queen of Romania | Official dinner at the White House, met with President Calvin Coolidge. Visited New York City, formally greeted by Jimmy Walker, the Mayor of New York City, Washington D.C., Philadelphia and other places. |
| June 26, 1967 | June 26, 1967 | Ion Gheorghe Maurer | Prime Minister | Informal visit. Departed U.S. June 27; visited New York City. |
| October 24, 1970 | October 24, 1970 | Nicolae Ceaușescu | President | Attended White House dinner on 25th Anniversary of the U.N; official visit to Washington, D.C., October 26–28. |
| December 3, 1973 | December 6, 1973 | Nicolae Ceaușescu | President | Official visit. Afterwards visited Wilmington, Cleveland, Hartford, and New York City. Departed U.S. December 7. |
| April 11, 1978 | April 14, 1978 | Nicolae Ceaușescu | President | State visit. Afterwards visited Chattanooga, Dallas, Houston, New Orleans, and New York City. Departed U.S. April 17. |
| April 19, 1993 | April 23, 1993 | Ion Iliescu | President | Attended dedication of the Holocaust Memorial Museum and met with President Clinton on April 21. |
| September 25, 1995 | September 29, 1995 | Ion Iliescu | President | Working visit. |
| July 14, 1998 | July 17, 1998 | Emil Constantinescu | President | Official visit. Addressed a Joint Session of Congress. Afterwards visited Chicago and San Francisco. Departed the U.S. July 22. |
| April 23, 1999 | April 23, 1999 | Emil Constantinescu | President | Attended NATO's 50th Anniversary Summit. |
| October 29, 2001 | November 1, 2001 | Adrian Năstase | Prime Minister | Met with President Bush November 1 during a private visit. |
| October 27, 2003 | October 29, 2003 | Ion Iliescu | President | Working visit. |
| March 28, 2004 | March 29, 2004 | Adrian Năstase | Prime Minister | Working visit. Attended NATO Accession ceremony. |
| July 18, 2004 | July 21, 2004 | Adrian Năstase | Prime Minister | Working visit. |
| March 8, 2005 | March 9, 2005 | Traian Băsescu | President | Working visit. |
| July 26, 2006 | July 28, 2006 | Traian Băsescu | President | Working visit. |
| May 20, 2012 | May 21, 2012 | Traian Băsescu | President | Attended the NATO Summit meeting in Chicago. |
| March 31, 2016 | April 1, 2016 | Klaus Iohannis | President | Attended the Nuclear Security Summit. |
| June 9, 2017 | June 9, 2017 | Klaus Iohannis | President | Official Working Visit. |
| August 19, 2019 | August 20, 2019 | Klaus Iohannis | President | Working Visit. |
| May 7, 2024 | May 7, 2024 | Klaus Iohannis | President | Working Visit. |
| July 10, 2024 | July 11, 2024 | Klaus Iohannis | President | Attended NATO 75th Anniversary Summit in Washington, D.C. |

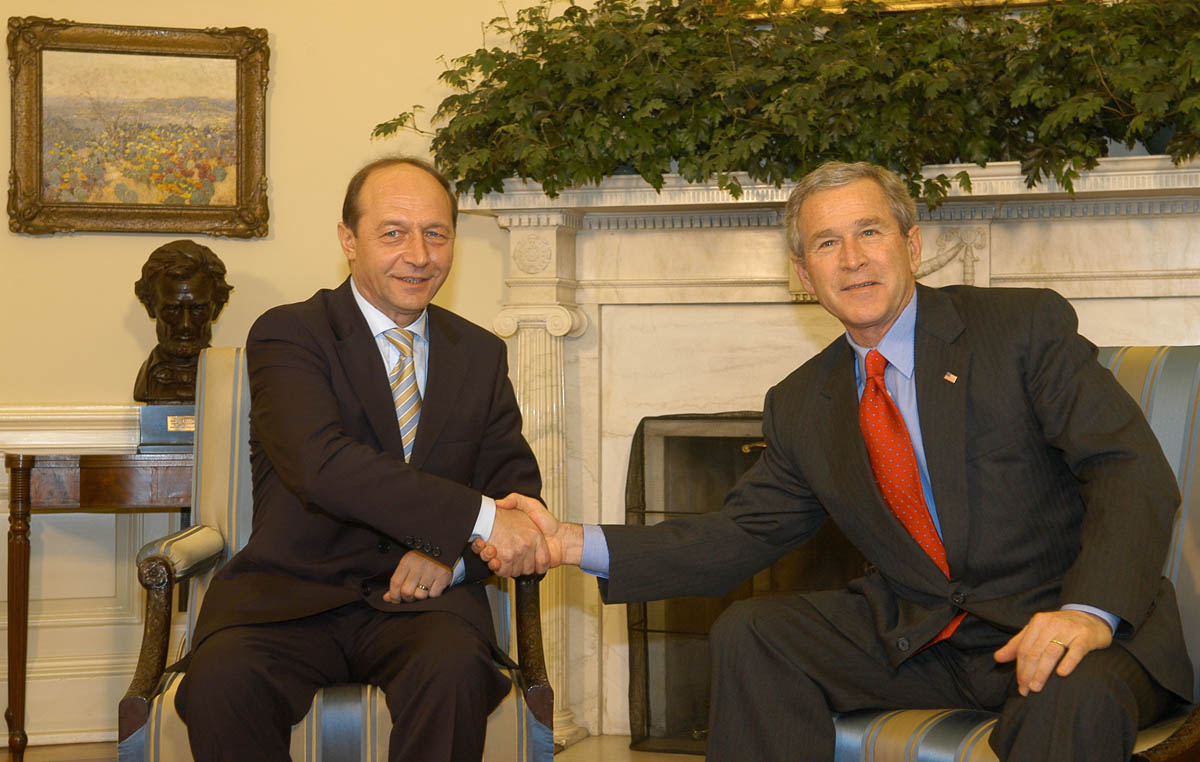

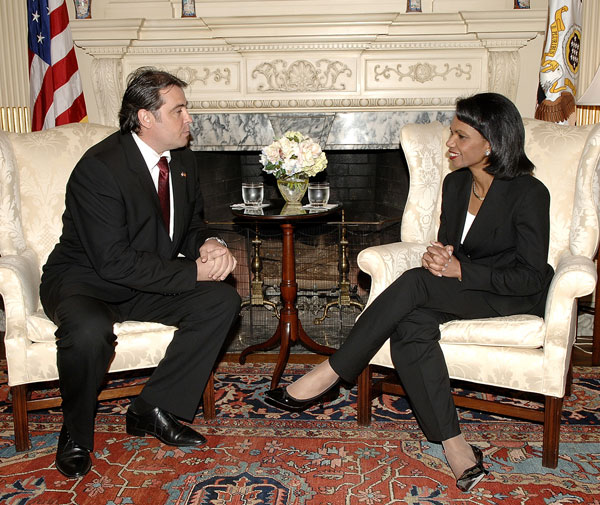

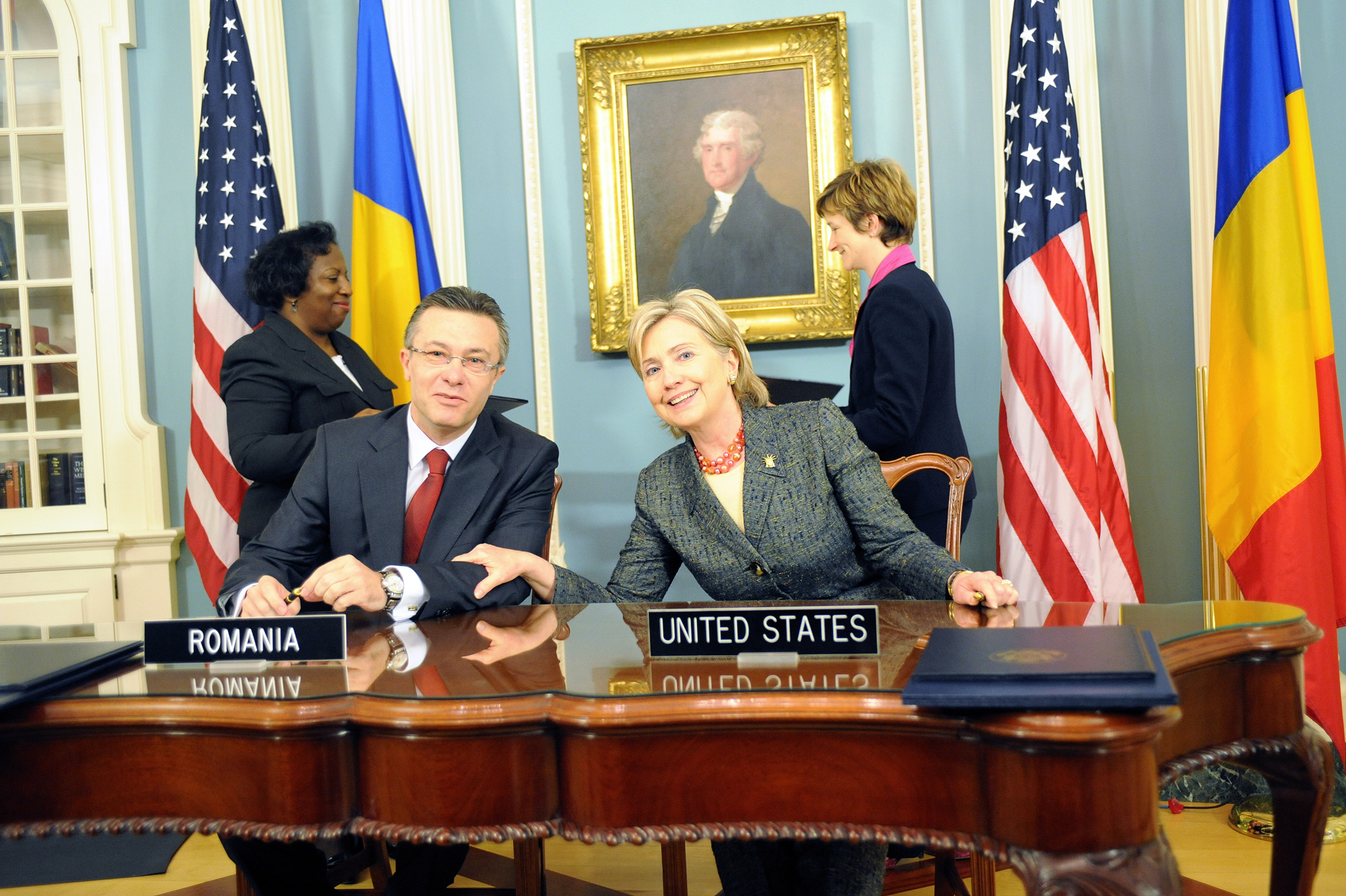

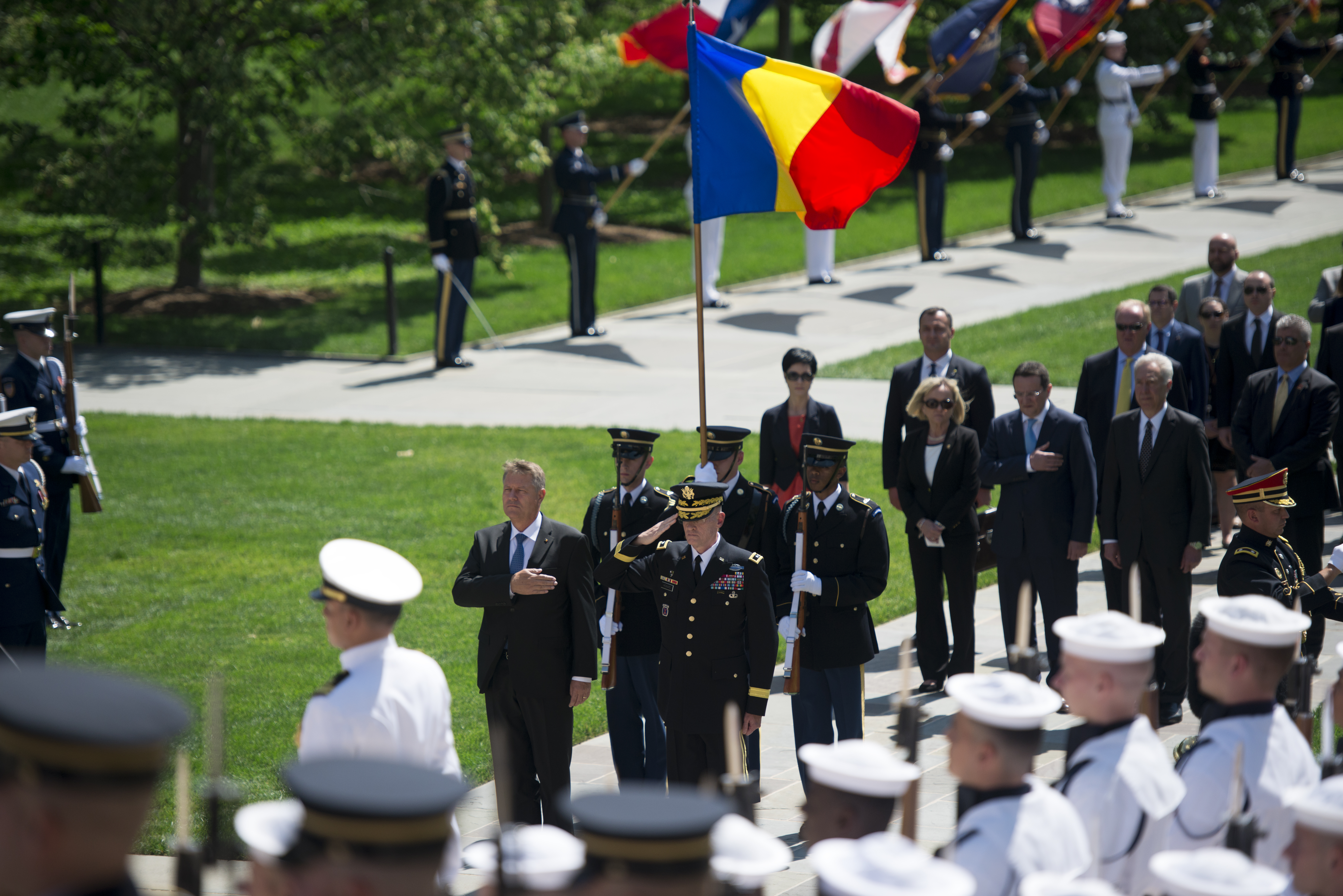

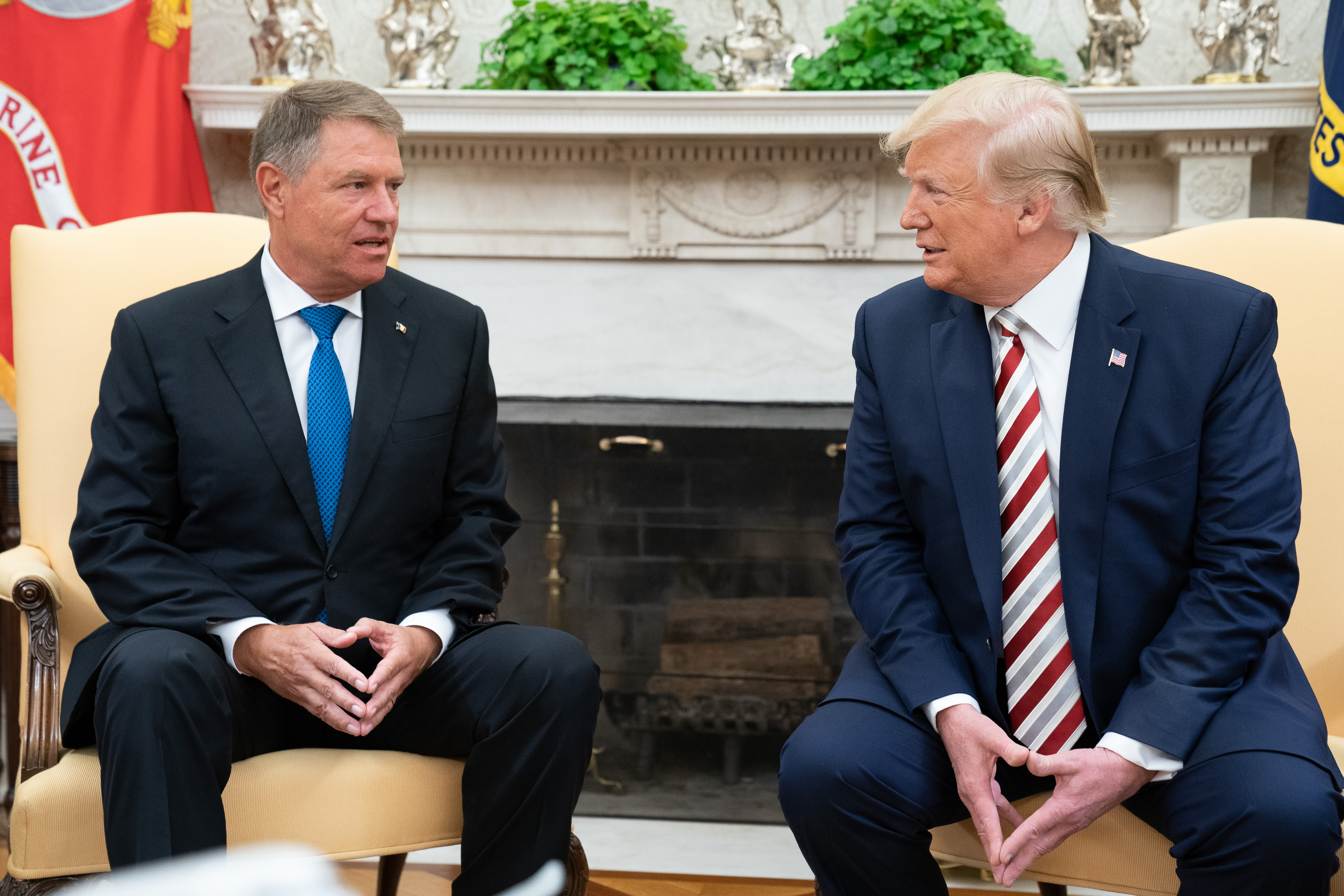

== Russia ==
Table of Trips
| Start | End | Guest | Title | Reason |
|---|---|---|---|---|
| January 31, 1992 | February 1, 1992 | Boris Yeltsin | President | Attended U.N. Security Council Summit meeting in New York City and discussed strategic arms reductions with President Bush at Camp David |
| June 15, 1992 | June 18, 1992 | Boris Yeltsin | President | State Visit. Addressed a joint meeting of Congress June 17. Also visited Annapolis. Afterwards visited Wichita |
| August 31, 1993 | September 2, 1993 | Victor Chernomyrdin | Prime Minister | Met with President Clinton during a private visit. |
| September 26, 1994 | September 29, 1994 | Boris Yeltsin | President | State visit; addressed U.N. General Assembly September 26. Visited Seattle before departing the U.S., September 29. |
| October 23, 1995 | October 23, 1995 | Boris Yeltsin | President | Summit meeting with President Clinton at Hyde Park, New York. |
| January 28, 1996 | February 2, 1996 | Victor Chernomyrdin | Prime Minister | Met with President Clinton and IMF officials; attended meeting of U.S.-Russian Joint Commission on Economic and Technological Cooperation. Later visited New York City. |
| February 5, 1997 | February 8, 1997 | Victor Chernomyrdin | Prime Minister | Attended meeting of the U.S.-Russia Bilateral Commission. Afterwards visited Chicago. |
| June 20, 1997 | June 22, 1997 | Boris Yeltsin | President | Attended the G-8 Economic Summit meeting in Denver. |
| March 9, 1998 | March 12, 1998 | Victor Chernomyrdin | Prime Minister | Working visit. |
| July 26, 1999 | July 27, 1999 | Sergei Stepashin | Prime Minister | Working visit. Attended meeting of U.S.-Russia Joint Commission and met with President Clinton. Also visited Seattle July 25. |
| September 6, 2000 | September 7, 2000 | Vladimir Putin | President | Met with President Clinton at the UN Millennium Summit in New York City. |
| November 12, 2001 | November 15, 2001 | Vladimir Putin | President | Met with President Bush in Washington, D.C., and Crawford. Also visited "Ground Zero" in New York City. |
| January 30, 2002 | February 4, 2002 | Mikhail Kasyanov | Prime Minister | Working visit. |
| September 26, 2003 | September 27, 2003 | Vladimir Putin | President | Official select visit at Camp David. |
| June 8, 2004 | June 10, 2004 | Vladimir Putin | President | Attended G-8 Economic Summit at Sea Island. |
| September 16, 2005 | September 16, 2005 | Vladimir Putin | President | Working visit. |
| July 1, 2007 | July 2, 2007 | Vladimir Putin | President | Working visit. Met with President Bush at Kennebunkport. |
| November 14, 2008 | November 15, 2008 | Dmitry Medvedev | President | Attended the G-20 Economic Summit meeting. |
| September 23, 2009 | September 23, 2009 | Dmitry Medvedev | President | Met with President Obama at the UN General Assembly in New York City. |
| September 24, 2009 | September 25, 2009 | Dmitry Medvedev | President | Attended the G-20 Economic Summit in Pittsburgh. |
| April 12, 2010 | April 13, 2010 | Dmitry Medvedev | President | Attended the Nuclear Security Summit. |
| June 22, 2010 | June 24, 2010 | Dmitry Medvedev | President | Working visit. |
| November 10, 2011 | November 13, 2011 | Dmitry Medvedev | President | Attended the Asia-Pacific Economic and Cooperation Summit at Honolulu and Kapolei, Hawaii. |
| May 18, 2012 | May 19, 2012 | Dmitry Medvedev | Prime Minister | Attended the G-8 Economic Summit at Camp David |
| September 28, 2015 | September 28, 2015 | Vladimir Putin | President | Met with President Obama at the UN General Assembly in New York City. |
| August 15, 2025 | August 15, 2025 | Vladimir Putin | President | Attended the 2025 Russia–United States Summit in Alaska and met with U.S. President Donald Trump to discuss ending the Russo-Ukrainian war |

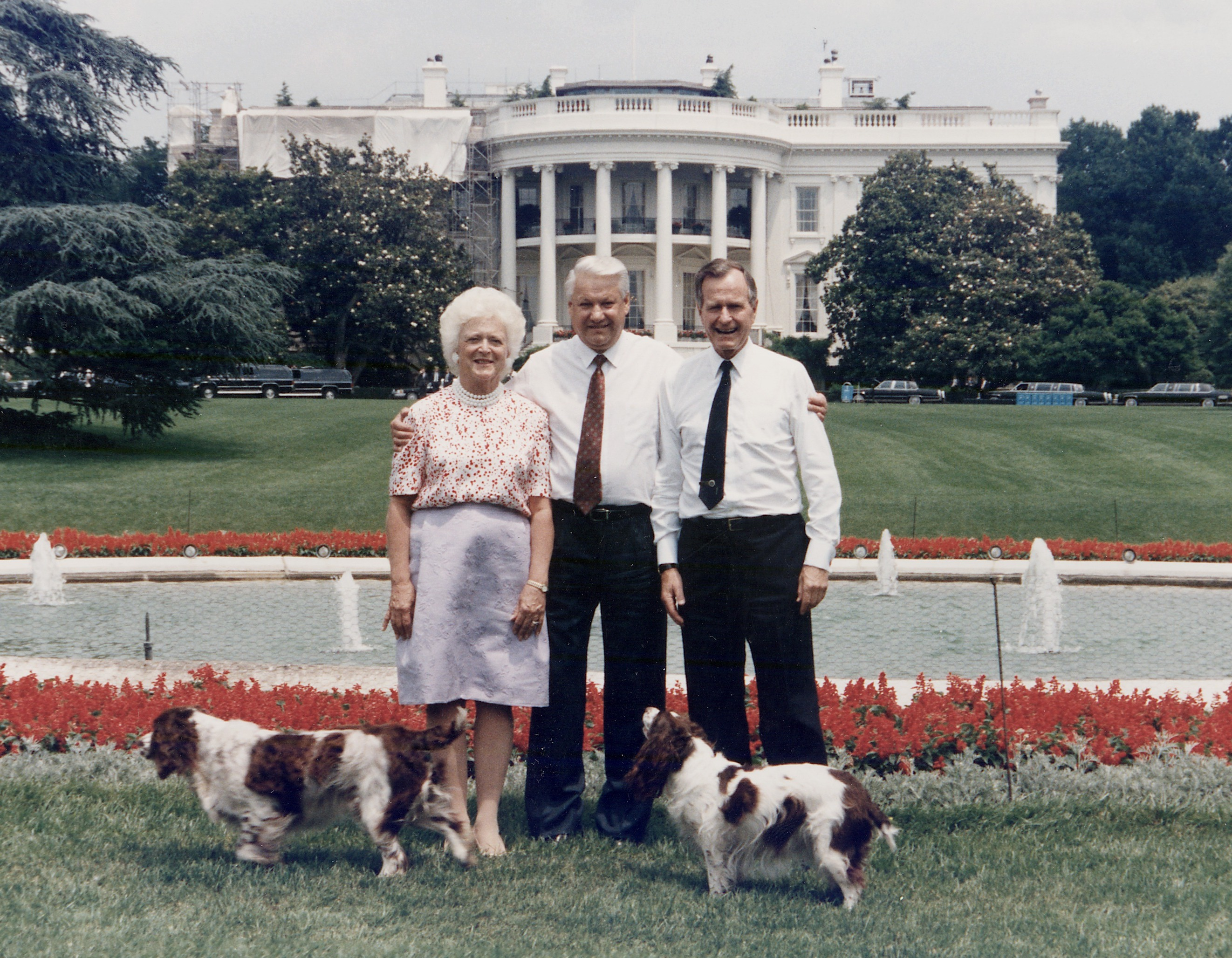

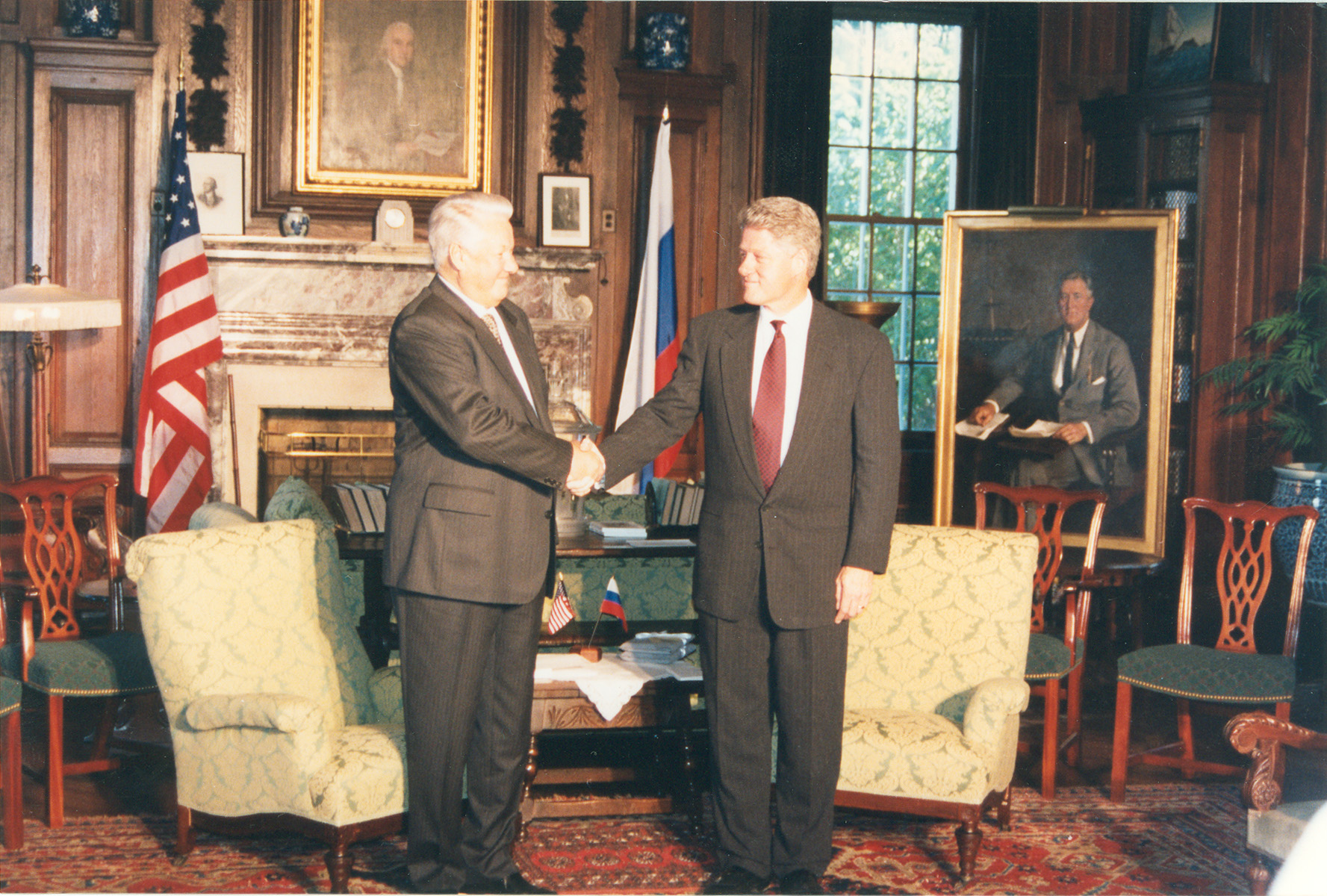

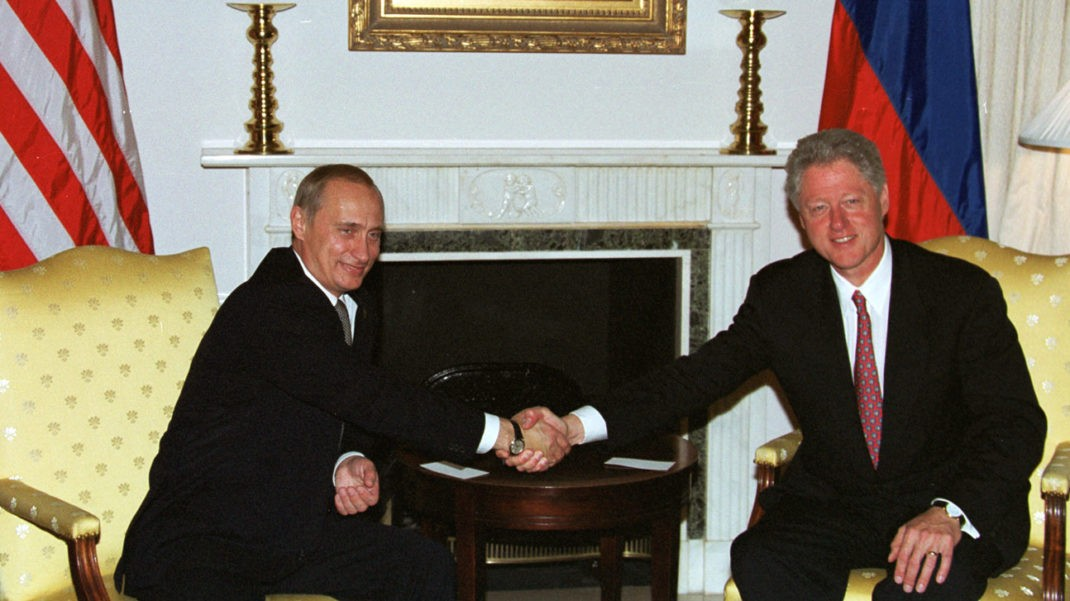

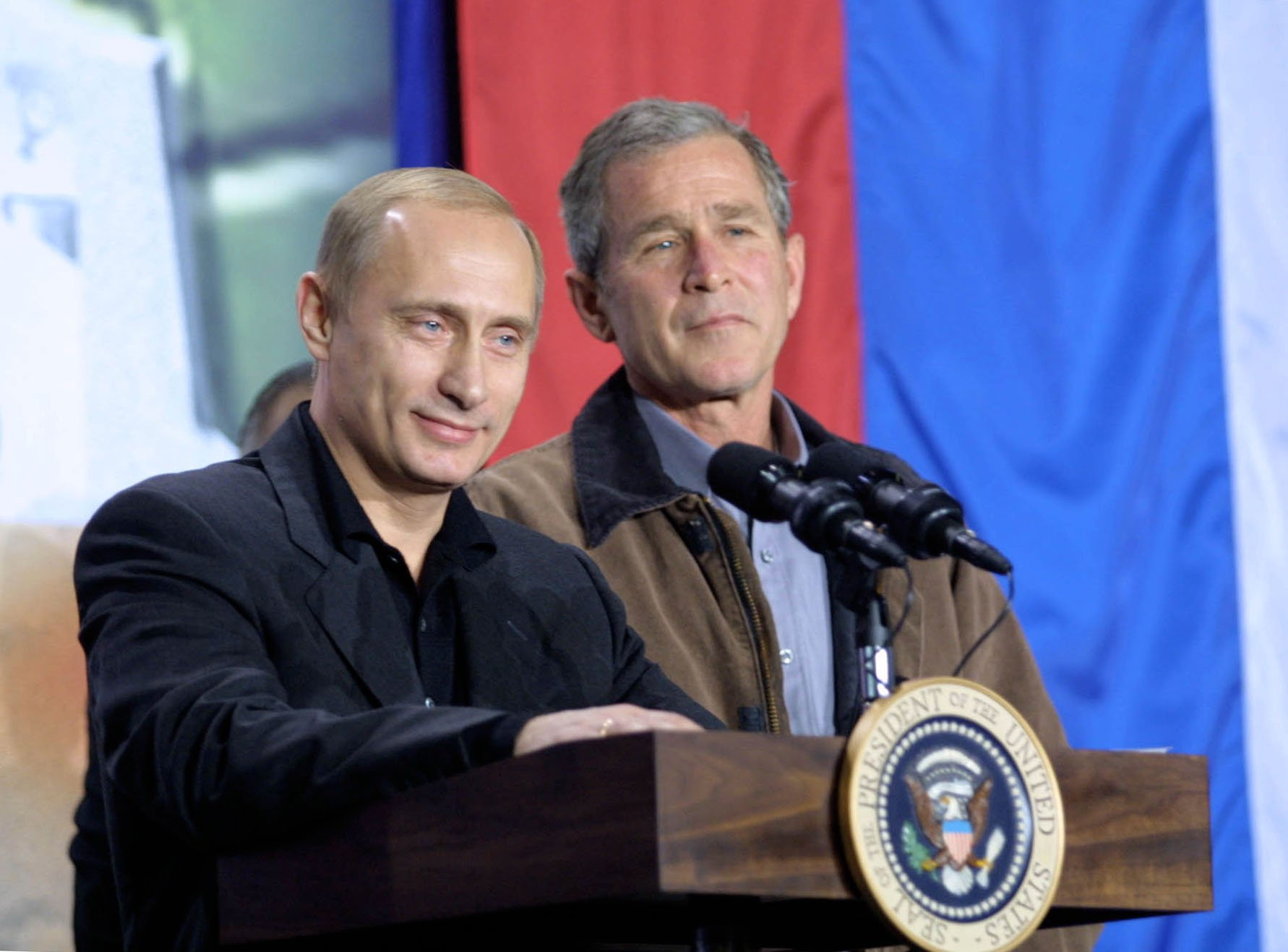

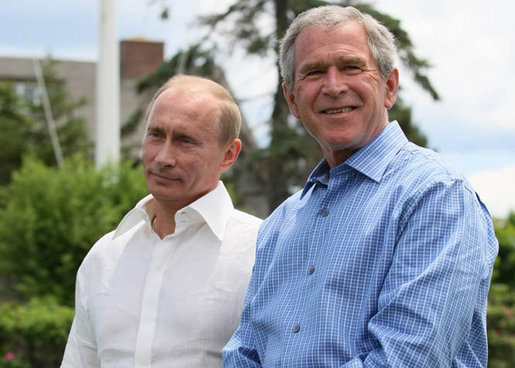

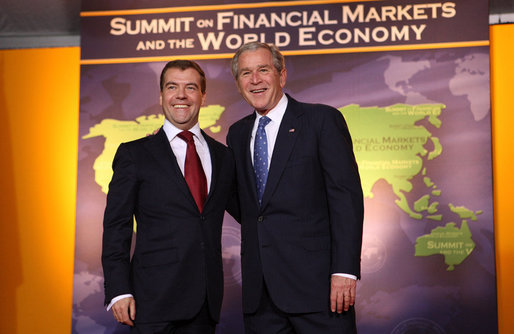

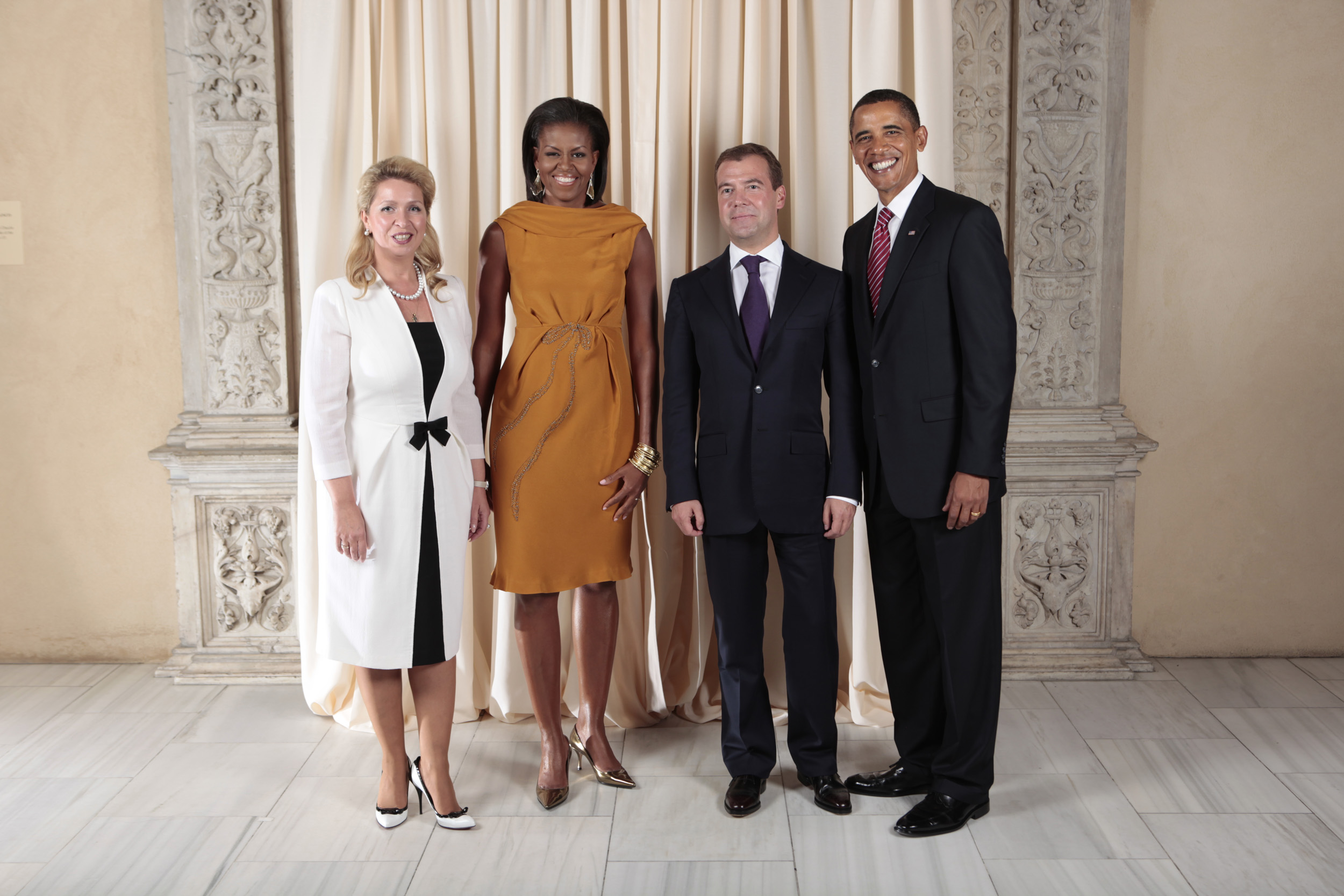

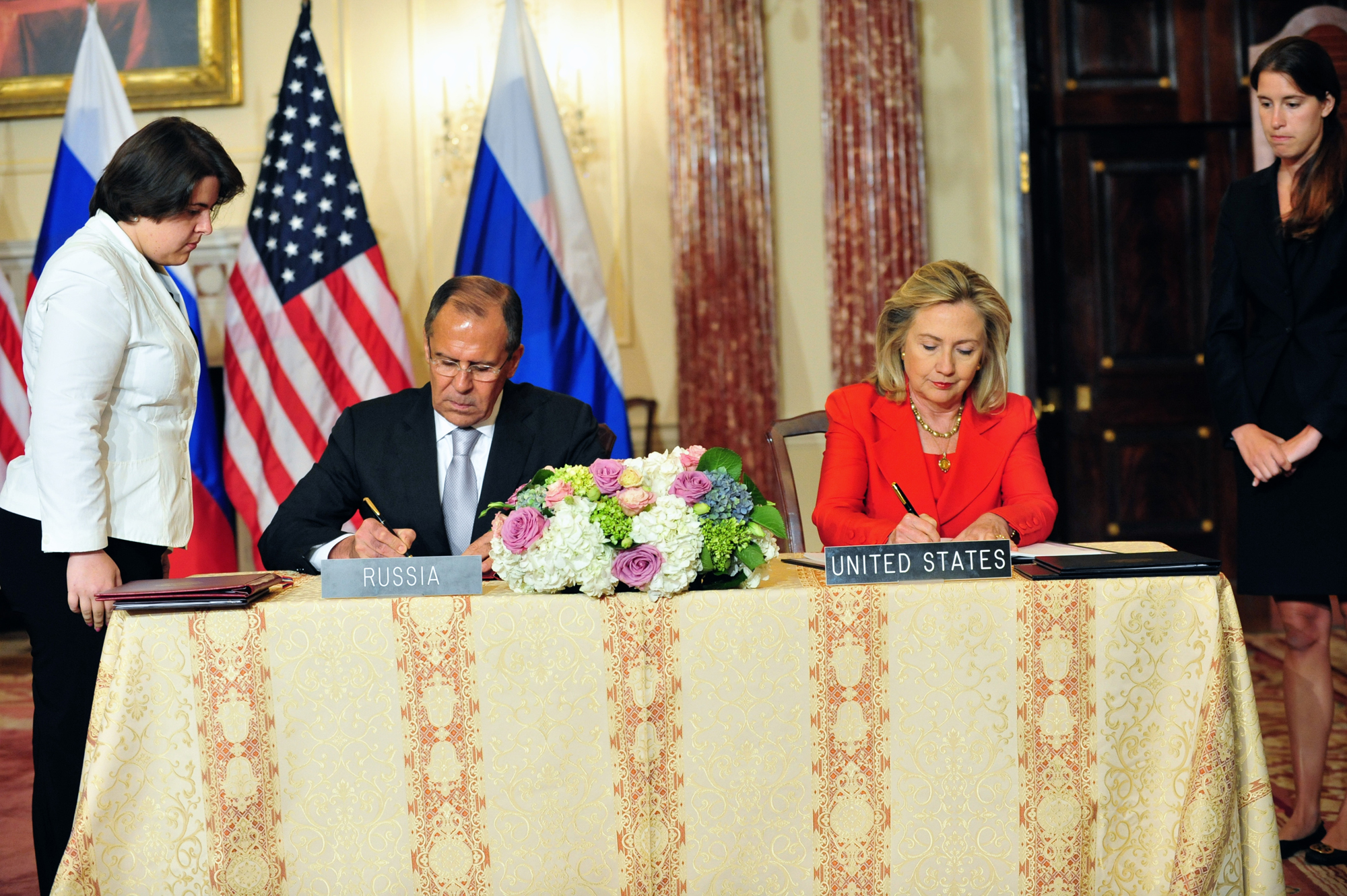

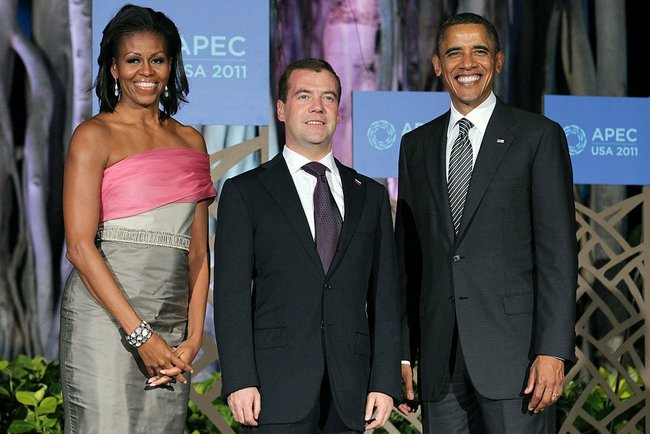

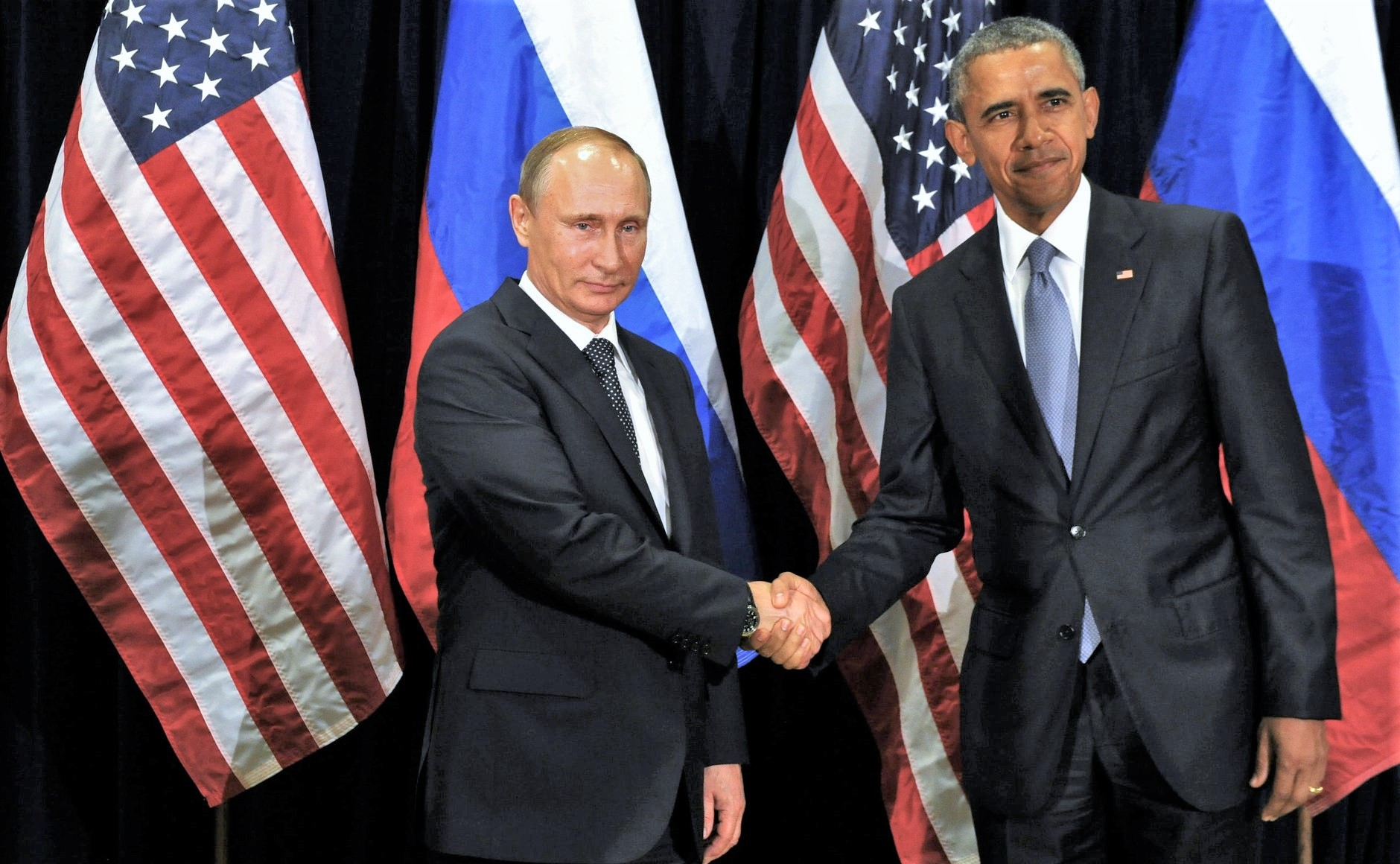

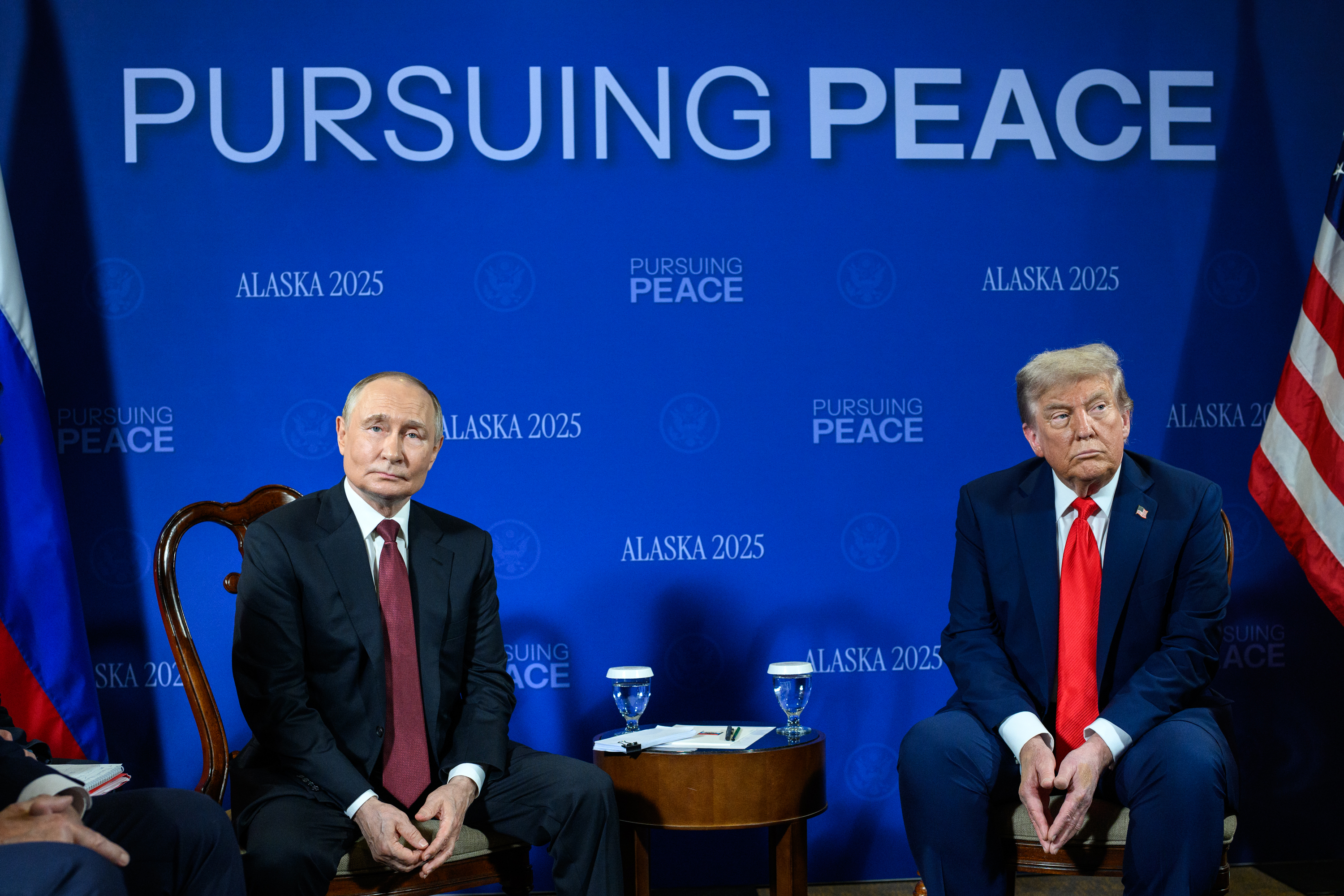

== Serbia ==
Table of Trips
| Start | End | Guest | Title | Reason |
|---|---|---|---|---|
| September 4, 2020 | September 4, 2020 | Aleksandar Vučić | President | Official Working visit. |

== Slovakia ==
Table of Trips
| Start | End | Guest | Title | Reason |
|---|---|---|---|---|
| April 20, 1993 | April 23, 1993 | Michal Kováč | President | Attended dedication of the Holocaust Memorial Museum and met with President Clinton on April 21. |
| June 20, 1994 | June 21, 1994 | Michal Kováč | President | Met with President Clinton during a private visit. |
| October 21, 1999 | October 21, 1999 | Michal Kováč | President | Attended dedication of the National Czech & Slovak Museum & Library in Cedar Rapids, Iowa. |
| April 23, 1999 | April 25, 1999 | Mikuláš Dzurinda | Prime Minister | Attended NATO's 50th Anniversary Summit. |
| September 21, 1999 | September 21, 1999 | Mikuláš Dzurinda | Prime Minister | Met with President Clinton during a meeting of the United Nations General Assembly in New York City. |
| November 7, 1999 | November 9, 1999 | Mikuláš Dzurinda | Prime Minister | Private visit. |
| June 7, 2002 | June 7, 2002 | Rudolf Schuster | Prime Minister | Met with President Bush during a private visit. |
| April 8, 2003 | April 9, 2003 | Rudolf Schuster | Prime Minister | Working visit |
| March 27, 2004 | March 29, 2004 | Mikuláš Dzurinda | Prime Minister | Working visit. Attended NATO Accession ceremony. |
| March 12, 2006 | March 13, 2006 | Mikuláš Dzurinda | Prime Minister | Working visit. |
| October 7, 2008 | October 9, 2008 | Ivan Gašparovič | Prime Minister | Working visit. |
| May 20, 2012 | May 21, 2012 | Ivan Gašparovič | Prime Minister | Attended the NATO Summit meeting in Chicago |
| May 1, 2019 | May 3, 2019 | Peter Pellegrini | Prime Minister | Working visit. |
| July 10, 2024 | July 11, 2024 | Peter Pellegrini | President | Attended NATO 75th Anniversary Summit in Washington, D.C. |

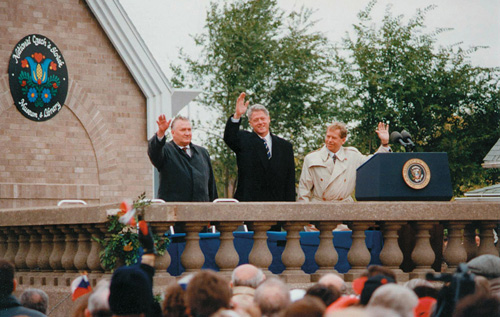

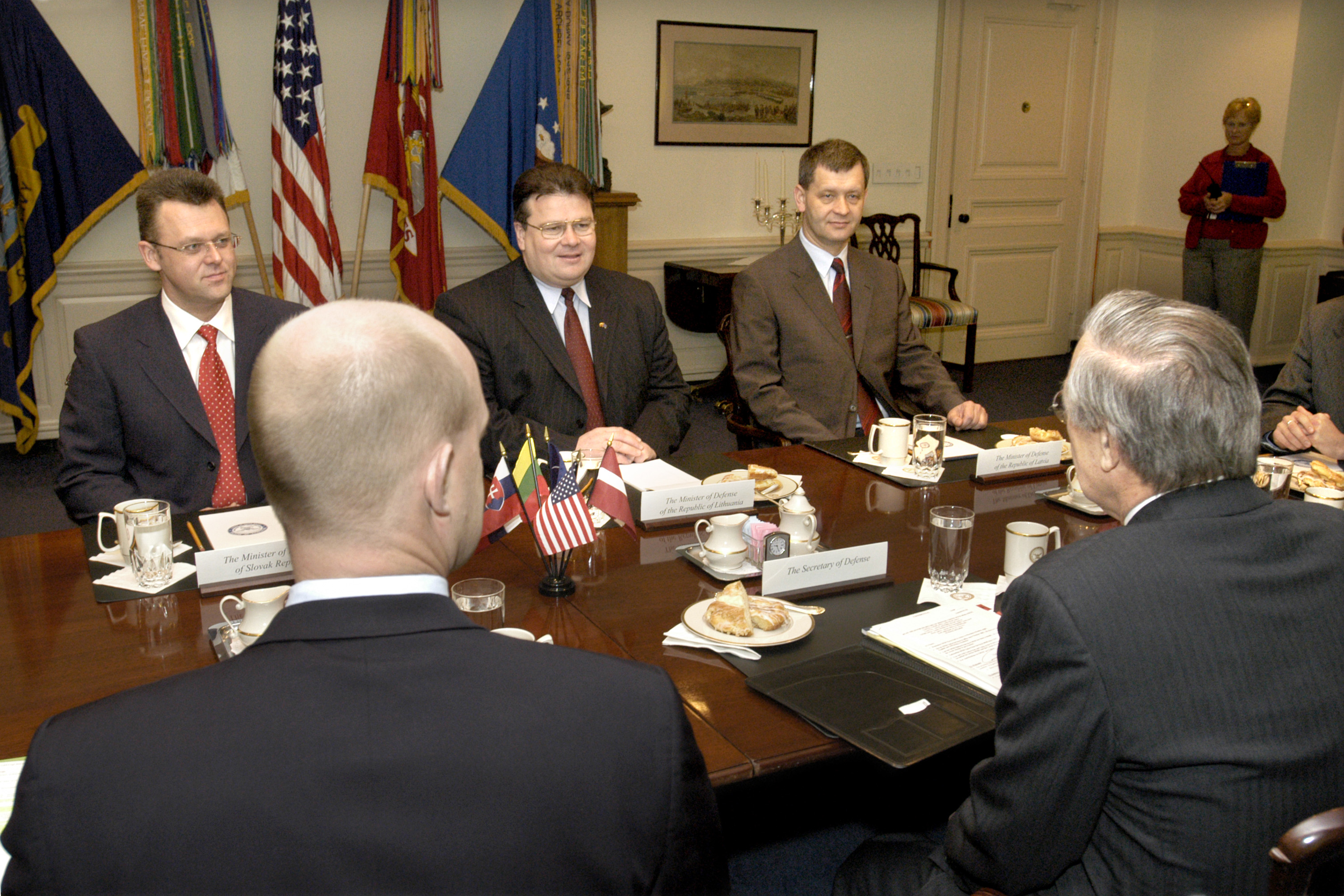

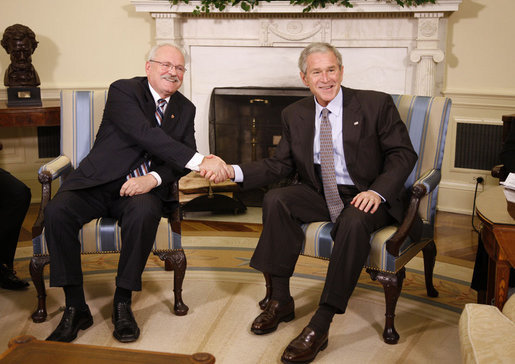

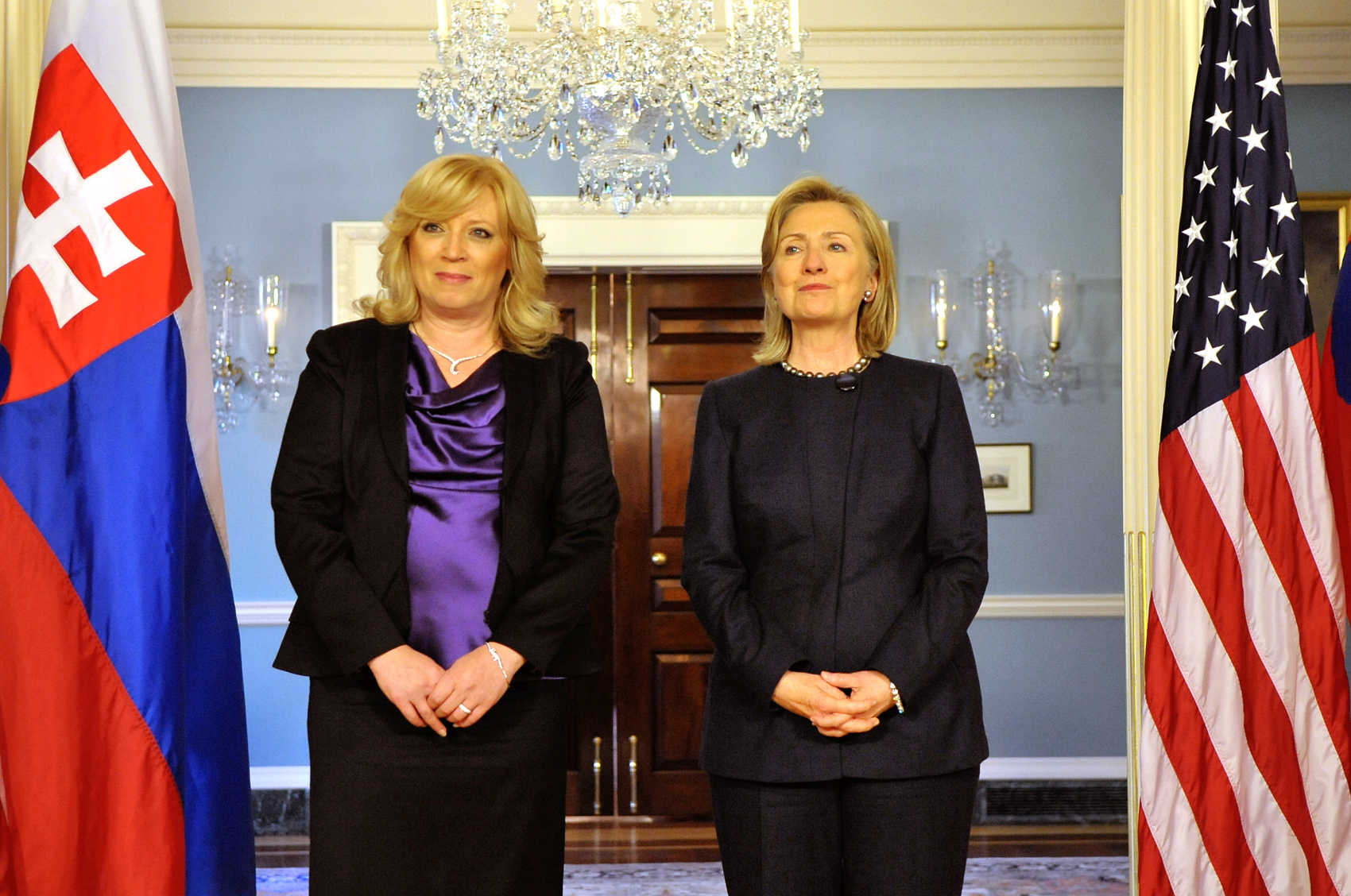

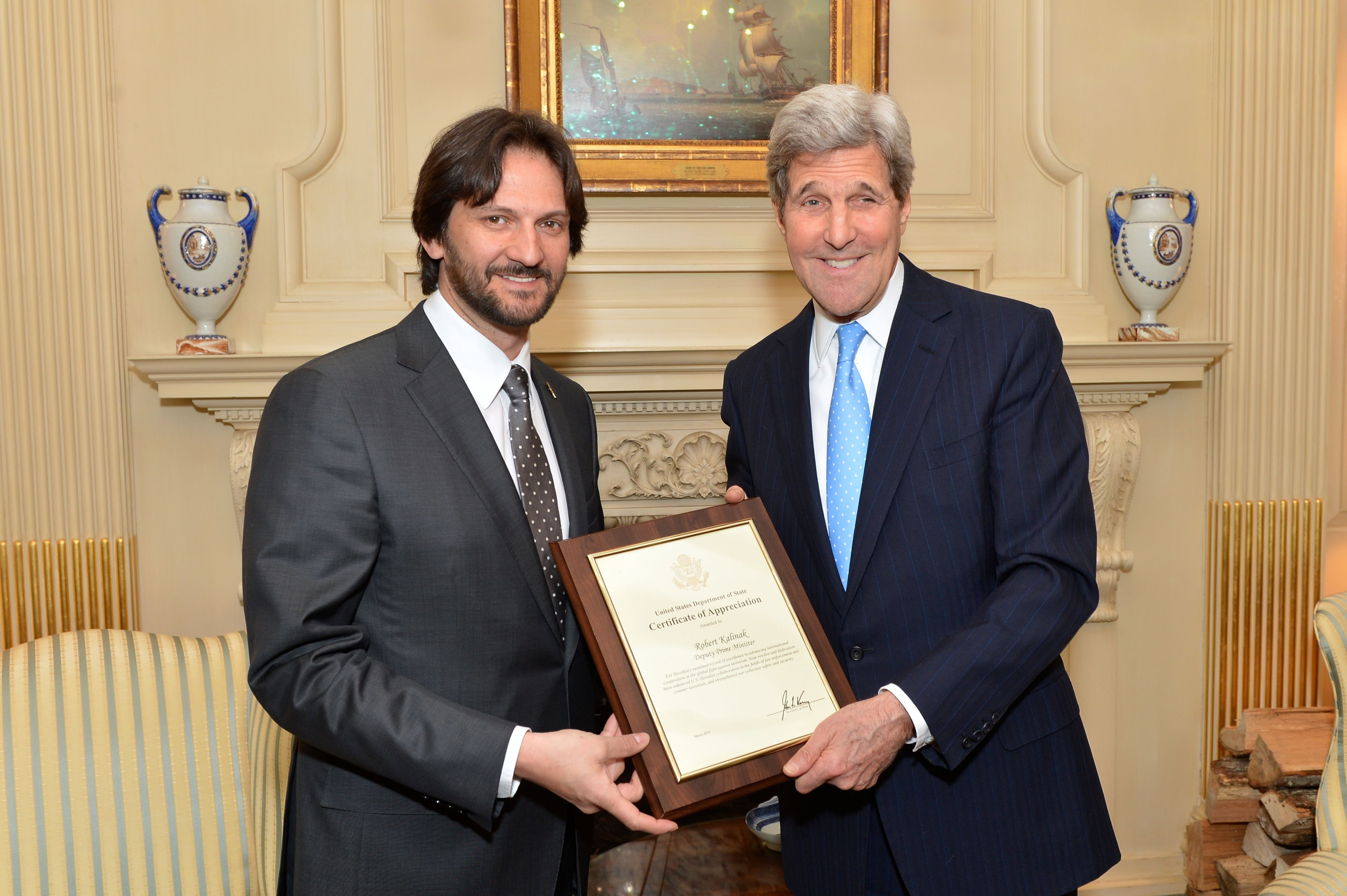

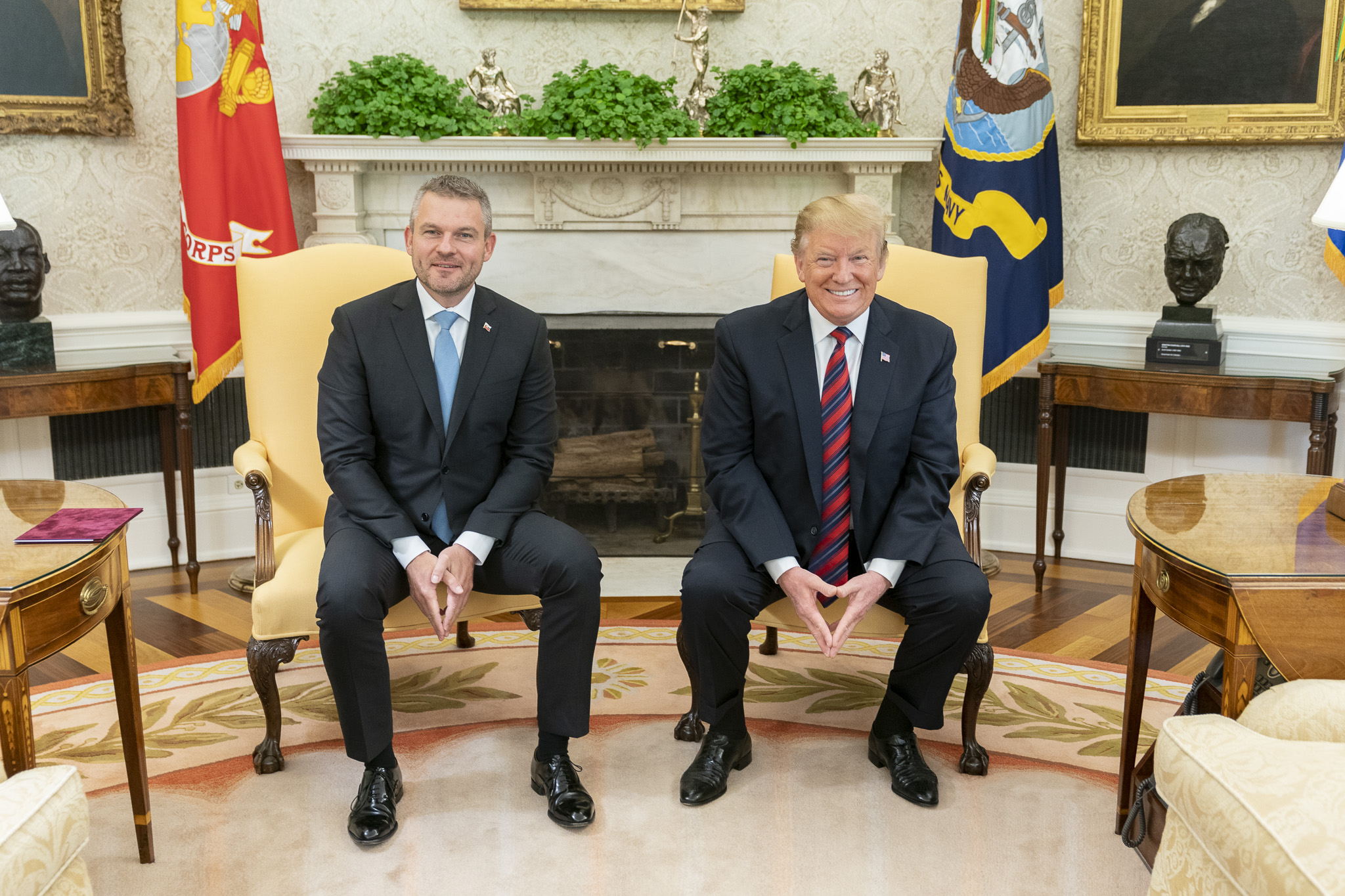

== Slovenia ==
Table of Trips
| Start | End | Guest | Title | Reason |
|---|---|---|---|---|
| April 20, 1993 | April 22, 1993 | Milan Kučan | President | Attended dedication of the Holocaust Memorial Museum and met with President Bill Clinton on April 21. |
| October 22, 1995 | October 22, 1995 | Janez Drnovšek | Prime Minister | Met with President Clinton at the UN General Assembly in New York City. |
| November 2, 1998 | November 5, 1998 | Janez Drnovšek | Prime Minister | Working visit. Afterwards visited Cleveland, Ohio. |
| April 23, 1999 | April 25, 1999 | Janez Drnovšek | Prime Minister | Attended NATO's 50th Anniversary Summit. |
| May 13, 2002 | May 17, 2002 | Janez Drnovšek | Prime Minister | Working visit. |
| March 28, 2004 | March 30, 2004 | Anton Rop | Prime Minister | Working visit. Attended NATO Accession ceremony. |
| July 7, 2006 | July 11, 2006 | Janez Janša | Prime Minister | Working visit. |
| February 9, 2011 | February 9, 2011 | Borut Pahor | Prime Minister | Working visit. |
| May 20, 2012 | May 21, 2012 | Janez Janša | Prime Minister | Attended the NATO Summit meeting in Chicago |
| July 10, 2024 | July 11, 2024 | Robert Golob | Prime Minister | Attended NATO 75th Anniversary Summit in Washington, D.C. |
| October 22, 2024 | October 22, 2024 | Robert Golob | Prime Minister | Official Visit. |

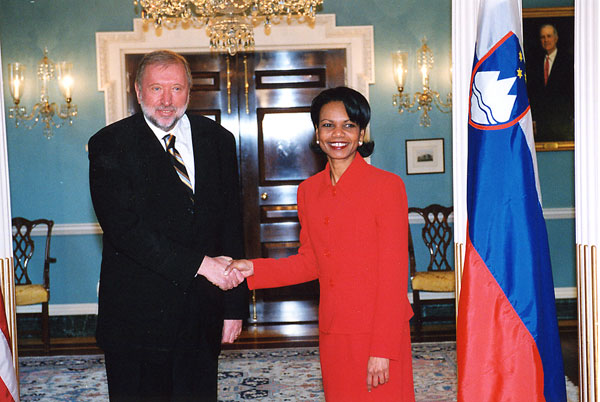

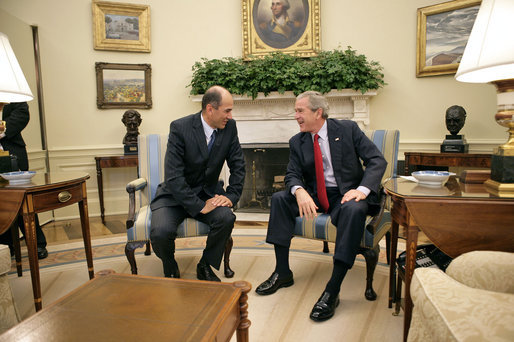

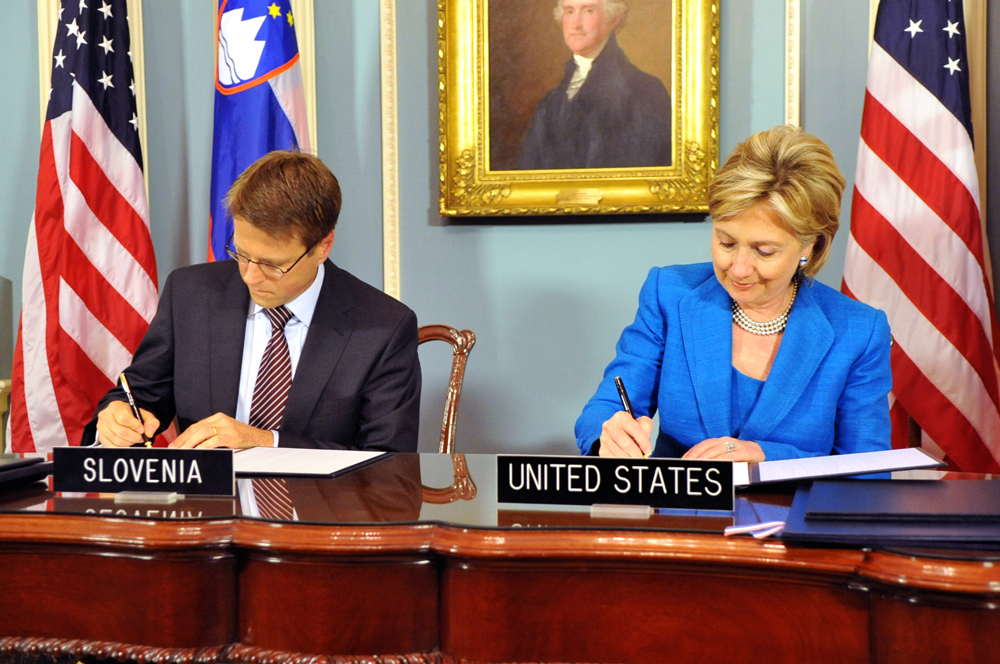

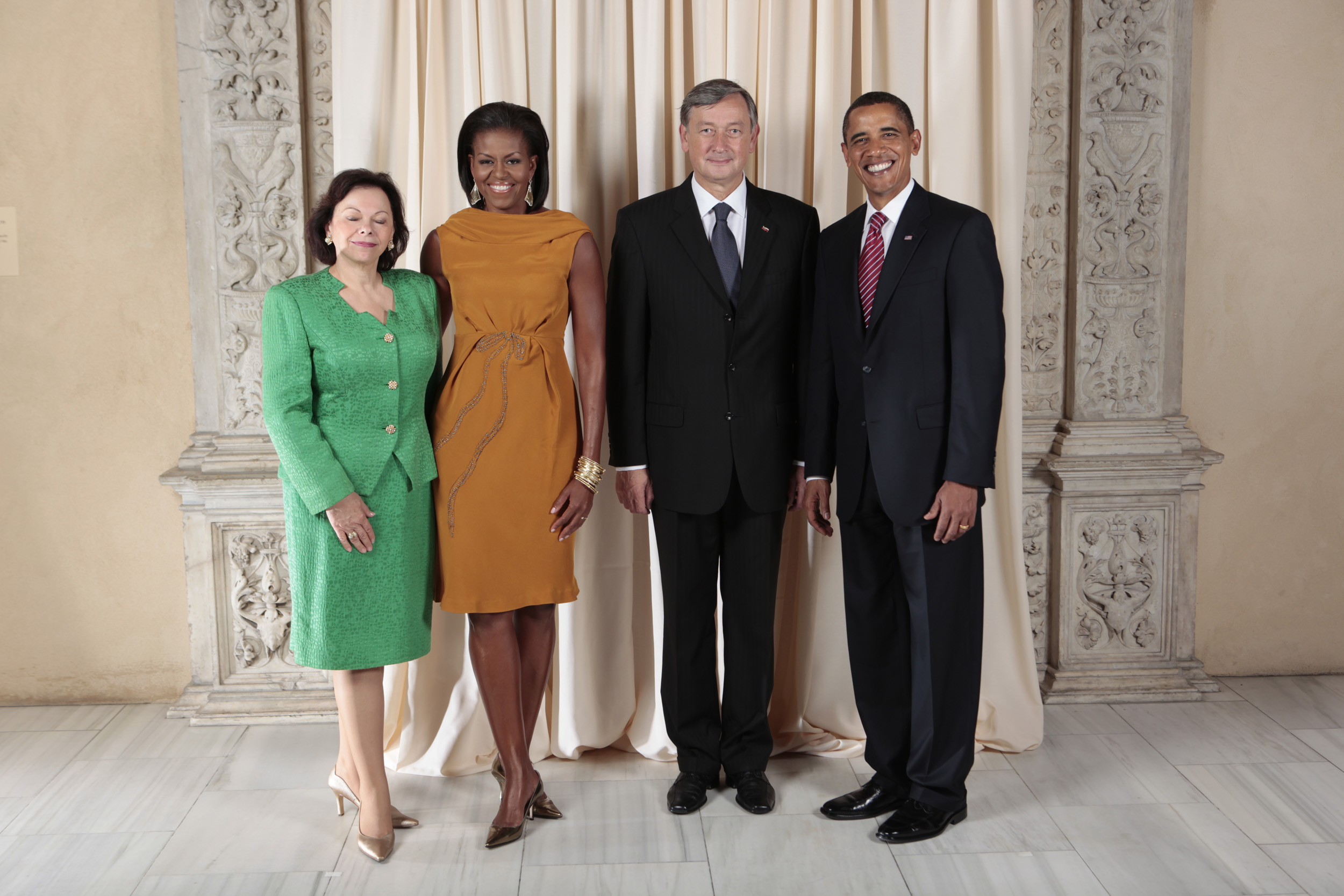

== Soviet Union ==
Table of Trips
| Start | End | Guest | Title | Reason |
|---|---|---|---|---|
| September 15, 1959 | September 16, 1959 | Nikita Khrushchev | Premier | Official visit at Washington, D.C. and Camp David Afterwards visited New York City, Los Angeles, San Francisco, Des Moines and Ames. Revisited Washington, D.C. and Camp David September 25–27. Departed U.S. September 27. |
| June 23, 1967 | June 25, 1967 | Alexei Kosygin | Chairman | Informal meetings with President Johnson at Glassboro, New Jersey. Kosygin led the Soviet delegation to the 5th Emergency Session of the U.N. General Assembly. |
| June 18, 1973 | June 26, 1973 | Leonid Brezhnev | General Secretary | official visit at Washington, D.C. and San Clemente. |
| December 7, 1987 | December 10, 1987 | Mikhail Gorbachev | General Secretary | Official Working Visit. Signed INF Treaty December 8. |
| December 7, 1988 | December 7, 1988 | Mikhail Gorbachev | President | Met with President Reagan and President-elect Bush in New York City. |
| May 30, 1990 | June 6, 1990 | Mikhail Gorbachev | President | Summit meeting in Washington, D.C. and Camp David, Md. Afterwards visited Minneapolis-St. Paul and San Francisco, meeting with South Korean President Roh Tae-woo. Departed the U.S. June 4. |

== Spain ==
Table of Trips
| Start | End | Guest | Title | Reason |
|---|---|---|---|---|
| June 1, 1976 | June 4, 1976 | Juan Carlos I | King | State visit; addressed joint session of U.S. Congress June 2. Afterwards visited New York City. |
| April 28, 1977 | April 29, 1977 | Adolfo Suárez | Prime Minister | Working visit. |
| January 14, 1980 | January 14, 1980 | Adolfo Suárez | Prime Minister | Private visit. |
| February 15, 1980 | February 15, 1980 | Juan Carlos I | King | Private visit. |
| October 12, 1981 | October 16, 1981 | Juan Carlos I | King | State visit; visited New York City. |
| June 20, 1983 | June 22, 1983 | Felipe González | Prime Minister | Official working visit. Private visit to New York City afterward. |
| September 26, 1985 | September 27, 1985 | Felipe González | Prime Minister | Private Visit. Met with President Reagan September 27. |
| September 22, 1986 | September 22, 1986 | Juan Carlos I | King | Met with President Reagan in New York City. |
| September 25, 1987 | September 25, 1987 | Juan Carlos I | King | Met with President Reagan during a private visit. |
| October 18, 1989 | October 20, 1989 | Felipe González | Prime Minister | Official working visit to Washington, D.C. |
| September 30, 1990 | September 30, 1990 | Felipe González | Prime Minister | Met with President Bush at the U.N. General Assembly. |
| October 8, 1991 | October 10, 1991 | Juan Carlos I | King | Opened the "Circa 1492" art exhibit at the National Gallery of Art. Addressed the Organization of American States. |
| April 1, 1992 | April 3, 1992 | Felipe González | Prime Minister | Official working visit. |
| April 29, 1993 | April 29, 1993 | Juan Carlos I | King | Met with President Clinton. Later received the Gold Medal of the American Philosophical Society in Philadelphia. |
| December 5, 1993 | December 7, 1993 | Felipe González | Prime Minister | Met with President Clinton during a private visit. |
| April 12, 1999 | April 13, 1999 | Felipe González | Prime Minister | Working visit. |
| April 23, 1999 | April 25, 1999 | Felipe González | Prime Minister | Attended NATO's 50th Anniversary Summit. |
| February 22, 2000 | February 24, 2000 | Juan Carlos I | King | State Visit. |
| March 27, 2001 | March 29, 2001 | Juan Carlos I | King | Met with President Bush during a private visit. Also received International Democracy Medal. Arrived in US March 22. Afterwards visited Dallas, St. Augustine and Miami |
| November 27, 2001 | November 30, 2001 | Jose Maria Aznar | Prime Minister | Working visit. |
| March 1, 2002 | March 4, 2002 | Jose Maria Aznar | Prime Minister | Working visit. Attended U.S.-EU Summit meeting. Also visited Camp David |
| December 17, 2002 | December 18, 2002 | Jose Maria Aznar | Prime Minister | Working visit |
| February 21, 2003 | February 22, 2003 | Jose Maria Aznar | Prime Minister | Official select visit in Crawford |
| May 7, 2003 | May 8, 2003 | Jose Maria Aznar | Prime Minister | Working visit. |
| September 23, 2003 | September 23, 2003 | Jose Maria Aznar | Prime Minister | Met with President Bush at the UN General Assembly in New York City. |
| January 12, 2004 | January 14, 2004 | Jose Maria Aznar | Prime Minister | Working visit. |
| February 4, 2004 | February 4, 2004 | Jose Maria Aznar | Prime Minister | Addressed a joint session of Congress. |
| November 24, 2004 | November 24, 2004 | Juan Carlos I | King | Official select visit. Met with President Bush in Crawford |
| November 14, 2008 | November 15, 2008 | José Luis Rodríguez Zapatero | Prime Minister | Attended the G-20 Economic Summit meeting. |
| September 24, 2009 | September 25, 2009 | José Luis Rodríguez Zapatero | Prime Minister | Attended the G-20 Economic Summit meeting. |
| October 13, 2009 | October 13, 2009 | José Luis Rodríguez Zapatero | Prime Minister | Working Visit. |
| February 17, 2010 | February 17, 2010 | Juan Carlos I | King | Working Visit. |
| April 12, 2010 | April 13, 2010 | José Luis Rodríguez Zapatero | Prime Minister | Attended the Nuclear Security Summit. |
| May 20, 2012 | May 21, 2012 | Mariano Rajoy | Prime Minister | Attended the NATO Summit meeting in Chicago. |
| January 13, 2014 | January 13, 2014 | Mariano Rajoy | Prime Minister | Working visit. |
| September 15, 2015 | September 15, 2015 | Felipe VI | King | Official Working Visit. |
| September 26, 2017 | September 26, 2017 | Mariano Rajoy | Prime Minister | Official Working Visit. |
| June 19, 2018 | June 19, 2018 | Felipe VI | King | Working Visit. |
| May 12, 2023 | May 12, 2023 | Pedro Sánchez | Prime Minister | Working Visit. |
| July 10, 2024 | July 11, 2024 | Pedro Sánchez | Prime Minister | Attended NATO 75th Anniversary Summit in Washington, D.C. |

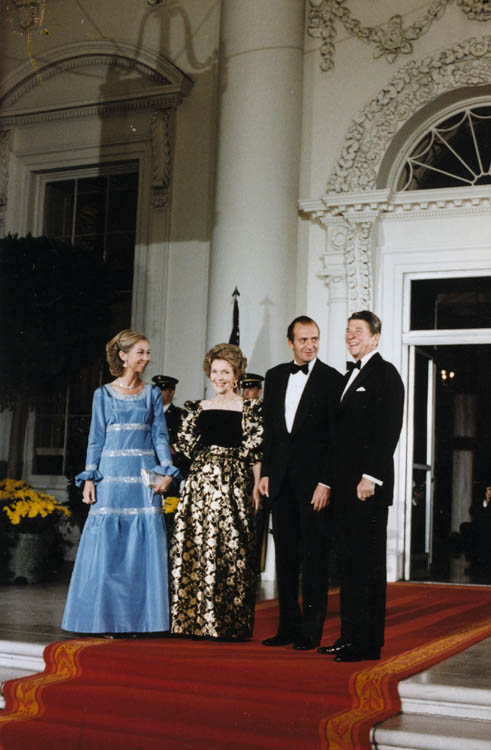

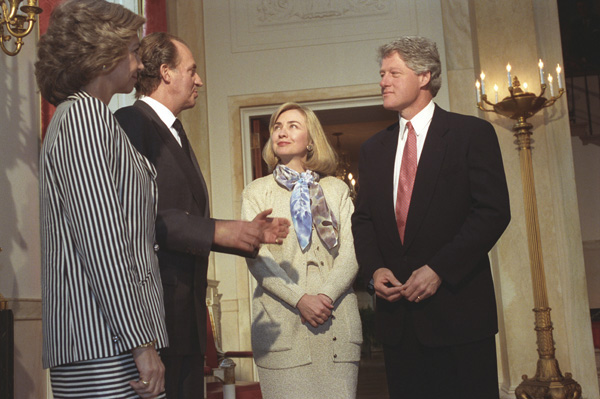

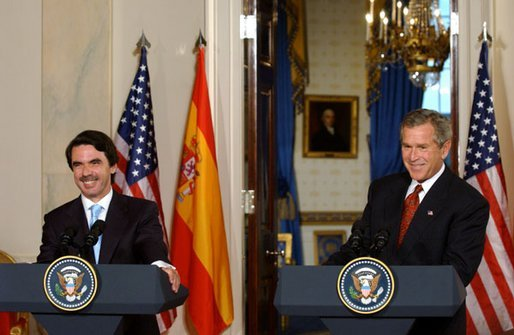

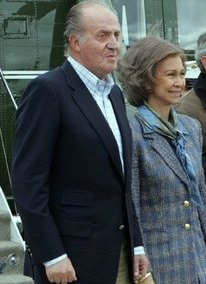

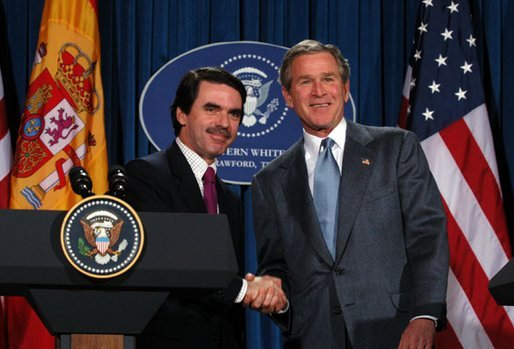

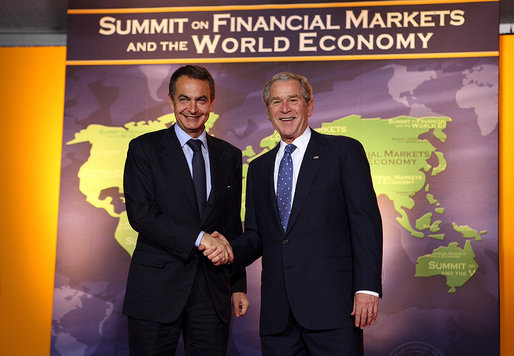

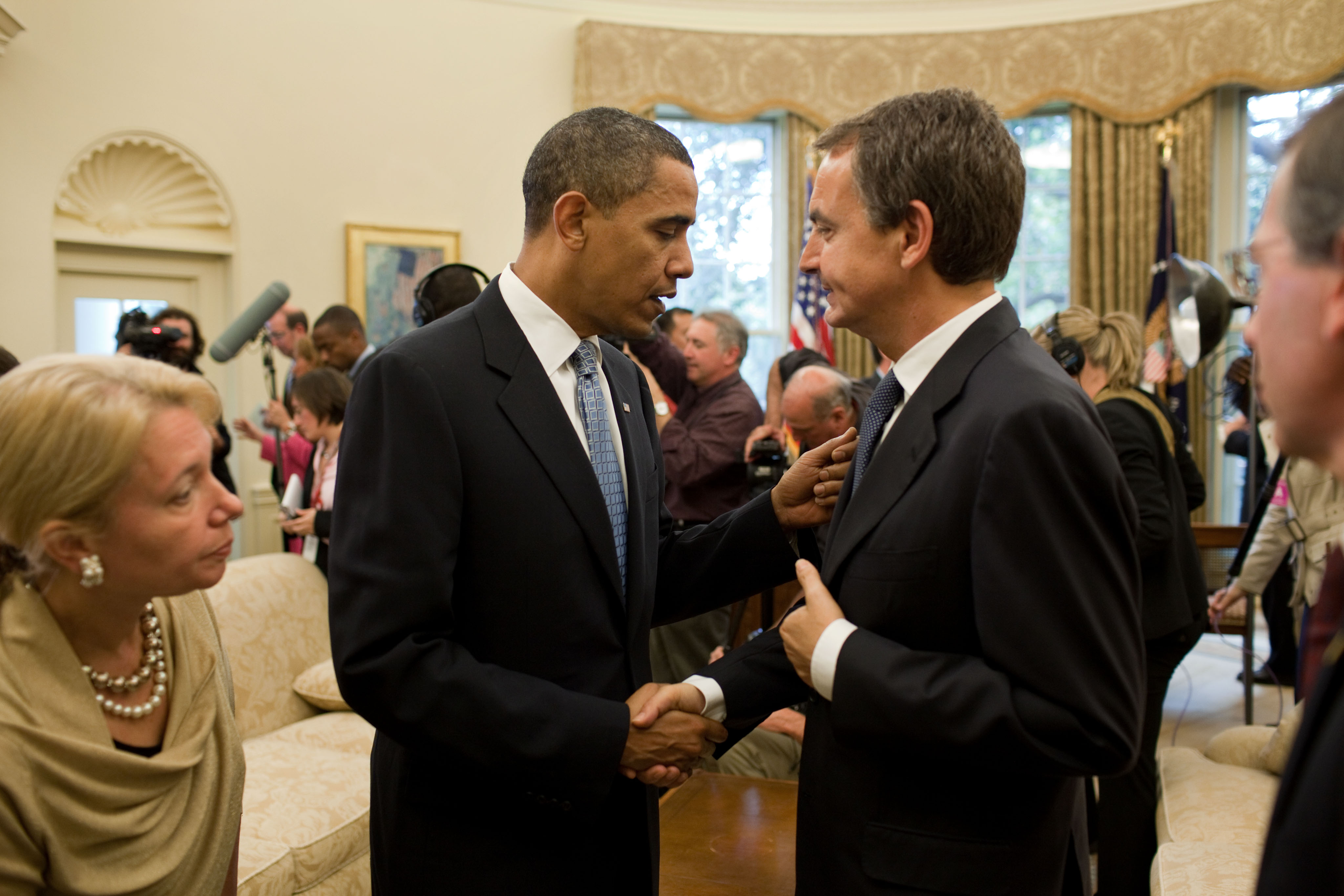

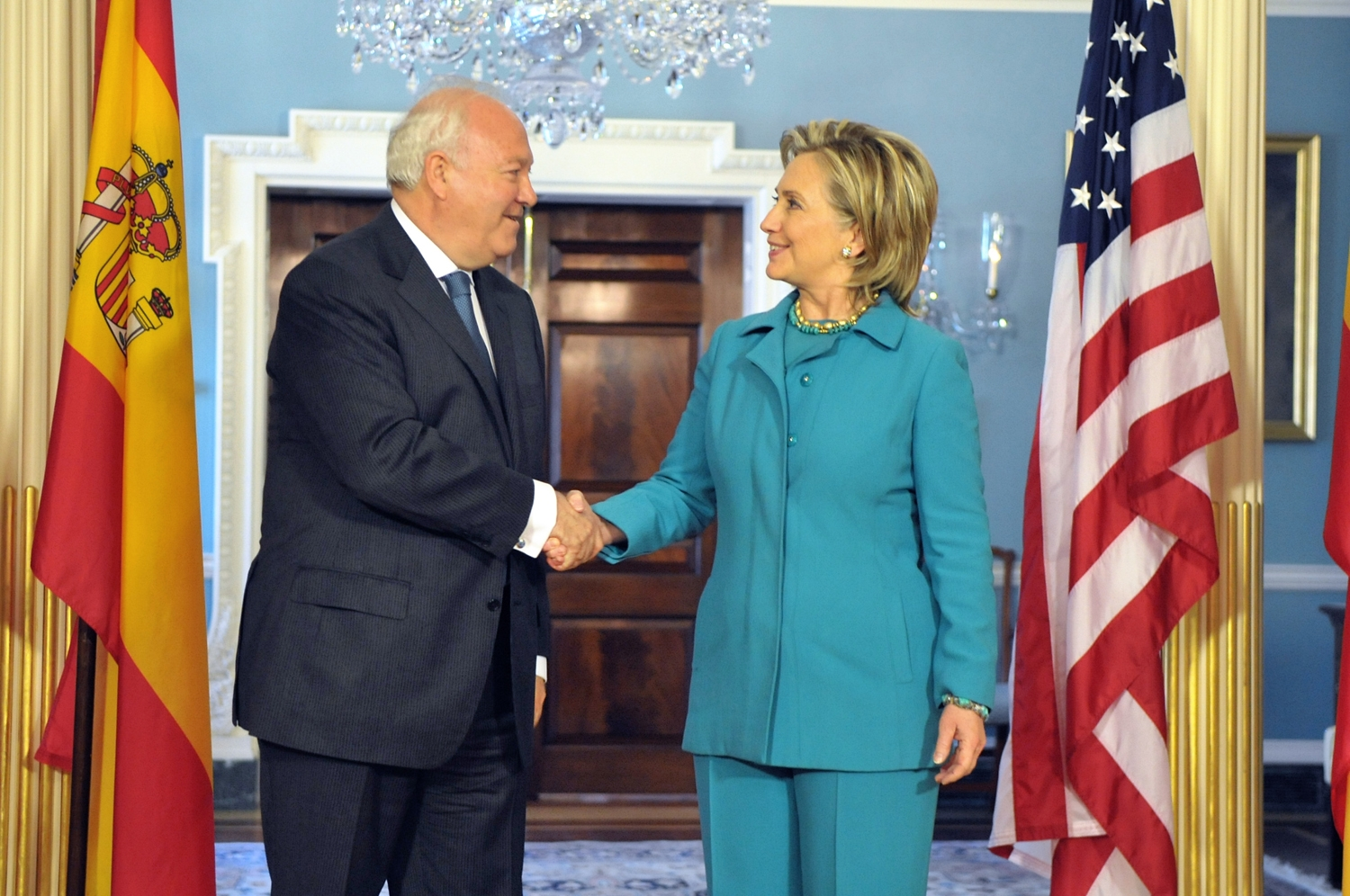

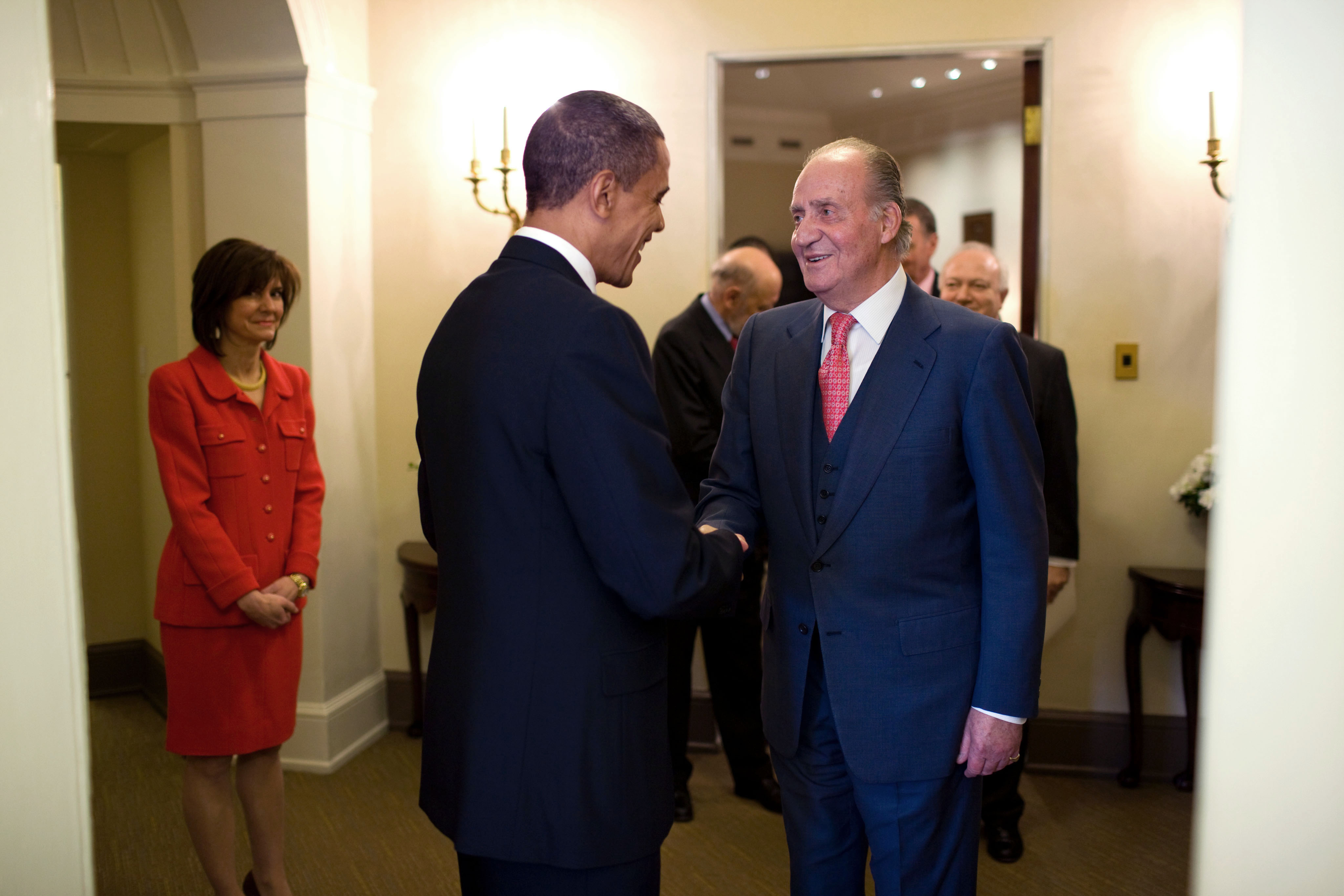

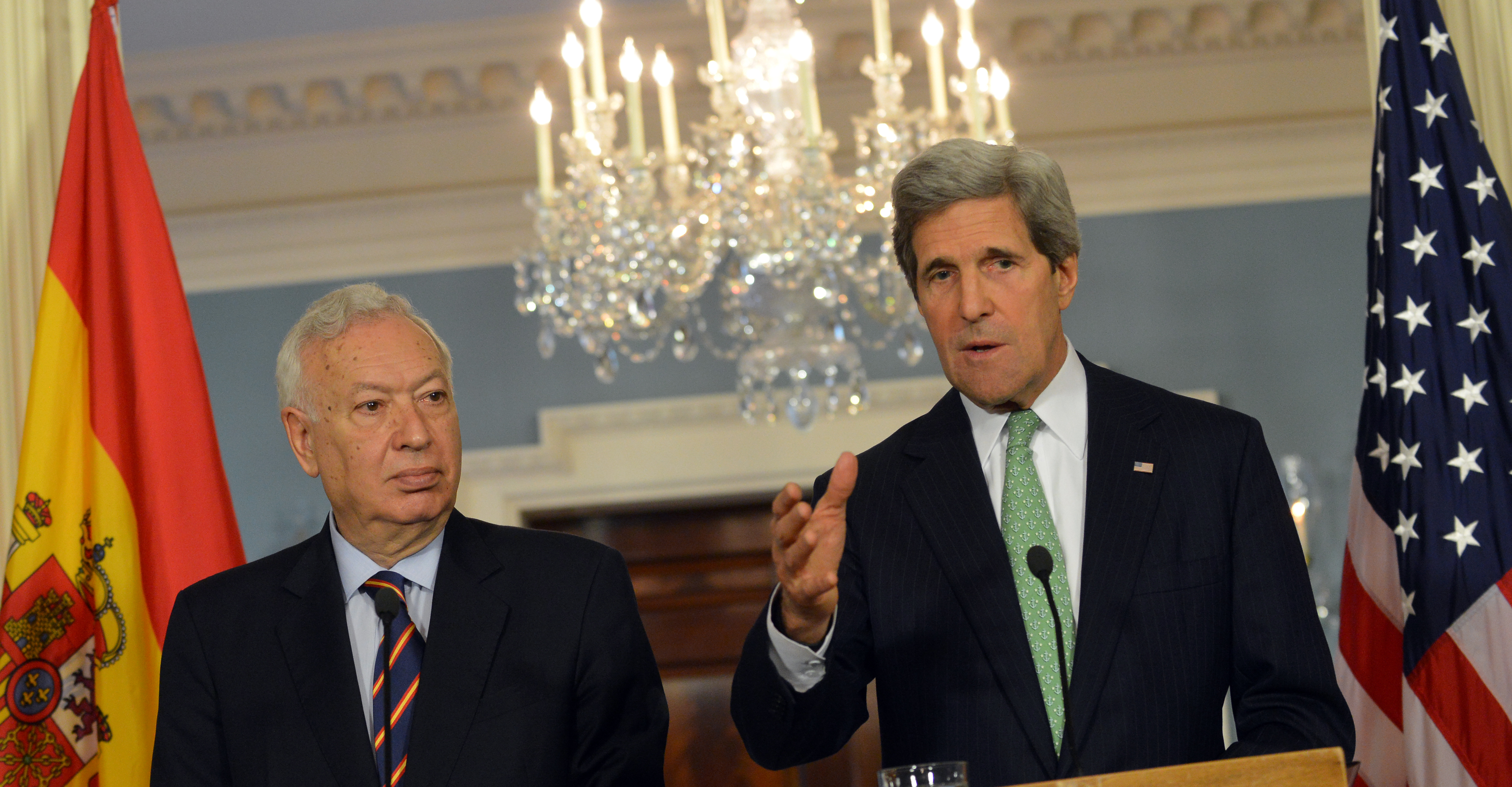

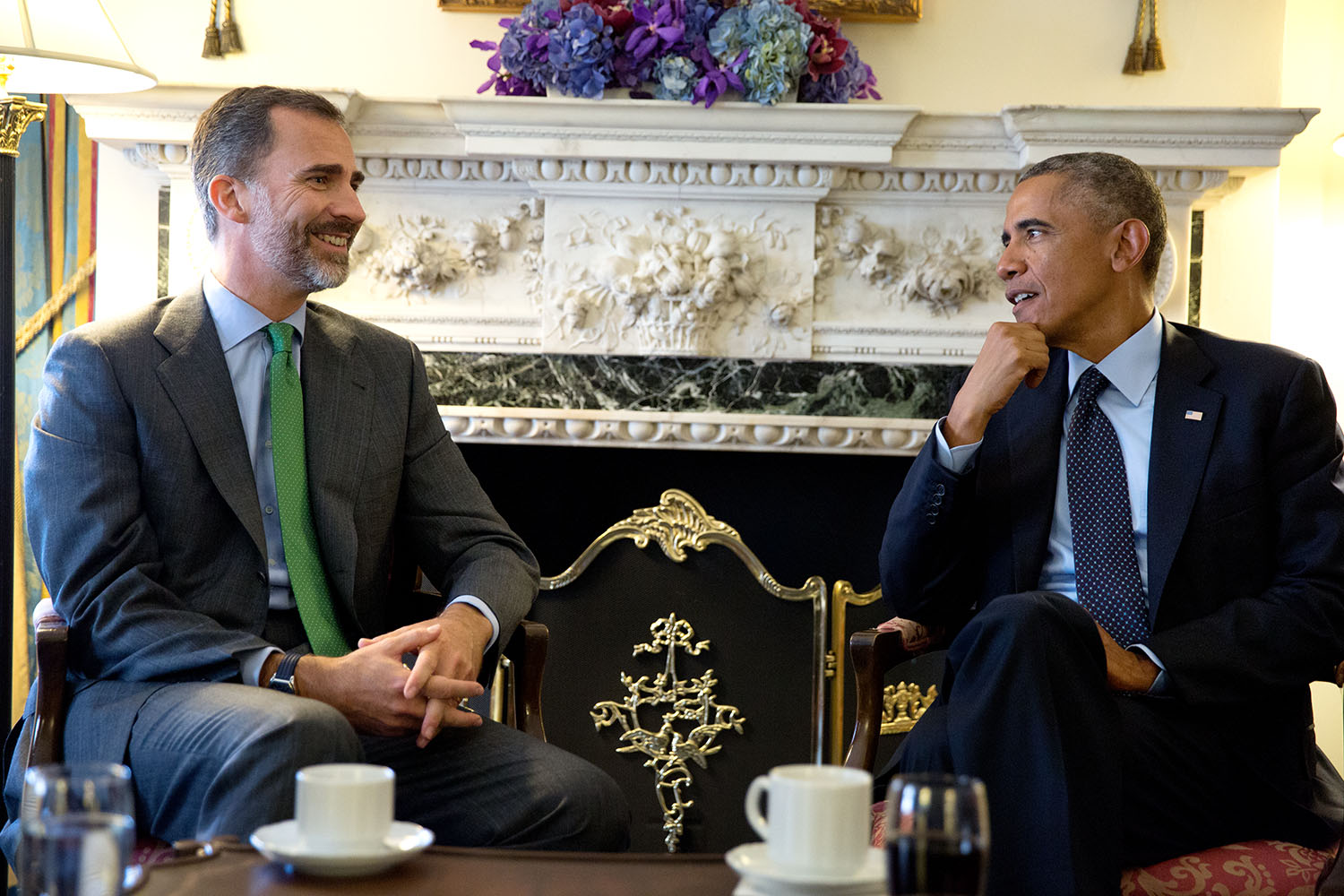

== Sweden ==
Table of Trips
| Start | End | Guest | Title | Reason |
|---|---|---|---|---|
| April 12, 1952 | April 16, 1952 | Tage Erlander | Prime Minister | Unofficial visit. In U.S. April 3–17. Also visited New York City, Rockford, Chicago, Minneapolis, and Detroit |
| November 23, 1954 | November 26, 1954 | Tage Erlander | Prime Minister | Arrived in U.S. November 16, aboard inaugural Trans-Arctic flight to Los Angeles by Scandinavian Airlines. Met with President Eisenhower November 24. |
| March 29, 1961 | March 29, 1961 | Tage Erlander | Prime Minister | Informal visit. In U.S. March 28 – April 4; visited New York City. |
| November 24, 1963 | November 25, 1963 | Tage Erlander | Prime Minister | Attended funeral of President Kennedy. |
| October 24, 1970 | October 24, 1970 | Olof Palme | Prime Minister | Attended White House dinner on 25th Anniversary of the U.N |
| April 5, 1976 | April 5, 1976 | Carl XVI Gustav | King | Private visit. |
| January 16, 1979 | January 18, 1979 | Ola Ullsten | Prime Minister | Private visit. Met with President Carter January 18. |
| November 22, 1981 | November 22, 1981 | Carl XVI Gustav | King | Private visit. Met with President Reagan |
| September 6, 1987 | September 11, 1987 | Ingvar Carlsson | Prime Minister | Official Visit. Afterwards visited Chicago, September 11–13. |
| February 19, 1992 | February 22, 1992 | Carl Bildt | Prime Minister | Official working visit. |
| December 1, 1993 | December 1, 1993 | Carl Bildt | Prime Minister | Met with President Clinton during a private visit. |
| August 5, 1996 | August 6, 1996 | Göran Persson | Prime Minister | Official working visit. |
| April 23, 1999 | April 25, 1999 | Göran Persson | Prime Minister | Attended NATO's 50th Anniversary Summit. |
| December 3, 2001 | December 3, 2001 | Göran Persson | Prime Minister | Working visit. |
| April 27, 2004 | April 28, 2004 | Göran Persson | Prime Minister | Working visit. |
| October 22, 2006 | October 24, 2006 | Carl XVI Gustav | King | Working visit. |
| May 14, 2007 | May 16, 2007 | Fredrik Reinfeldt | Prime Minister | Working visit. |
| September 24, 2009 | September 25, 2009 | Fredrik Reinfeldt | Prime Minister | Attended the G-20 Economic Summit in Pittsburgh. |
| November 2, 2009 | November 3, 2009 | Fredrik Reinfeldt | Prime Minister | Visited as President of the European Council. |
| April 12, 2010 | April 13, 2010 | Fredrik Reinfeldt | Prime Minister | Attended the Nuclear Security Summit. |
| May 20, 2012 | May 21, 2012 | Fredrik Reinfeldt | Prime Minister | Attended the NATO Summit meeting in Chicago |
| May 13, 2016 | May 13, 2016 | Stefan Löfven | Prime Minister | Attended the U.S.-Nordic Leaders Summit |
| March 4, 2018 | March 7, 2018 | Stefan Löfven | Prime Minister | Working visit. |
| July 4, 2023 | July 5, 2023 | Ulf Kristersson | Prime Minister | Working visit. |
| July 10, 2024 | July 11, 2024 | Ulf Kristersson | Prime Minister | Attended NATO 75th Anniversary Summit in Washington, D.C. |

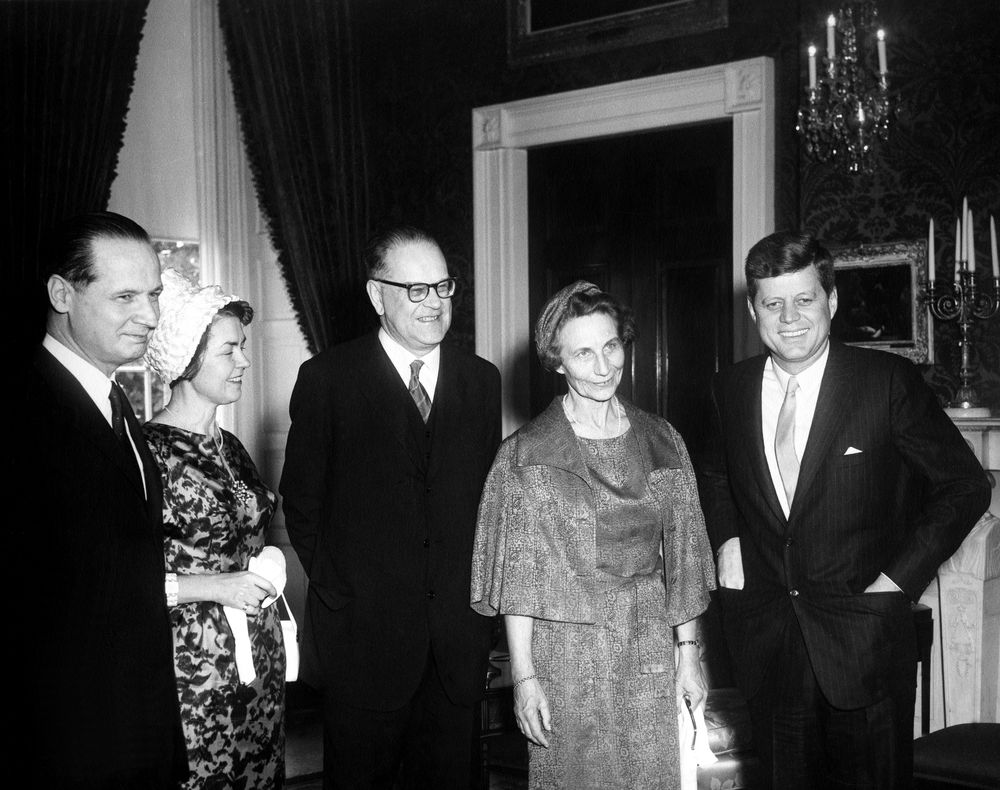

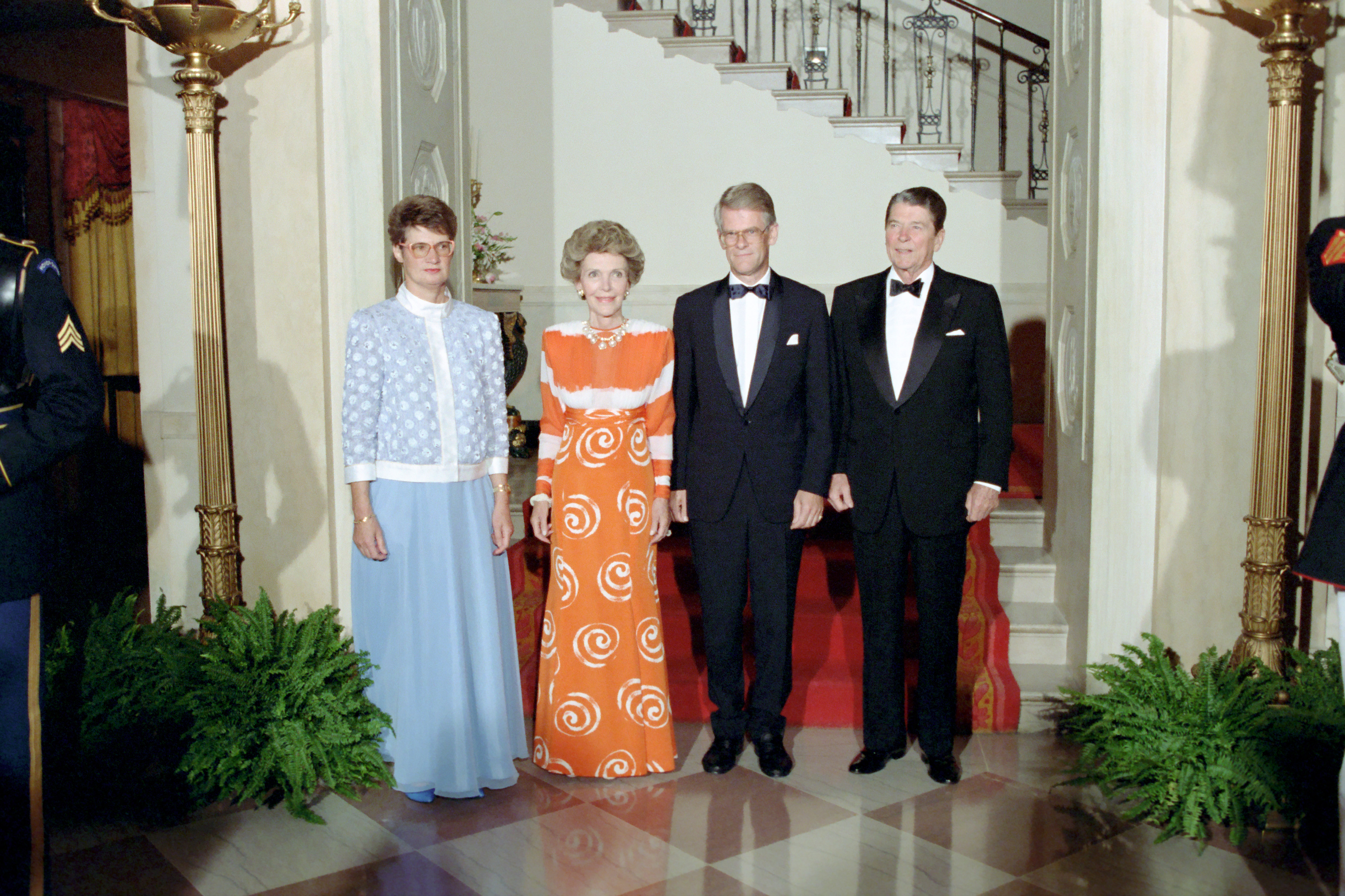

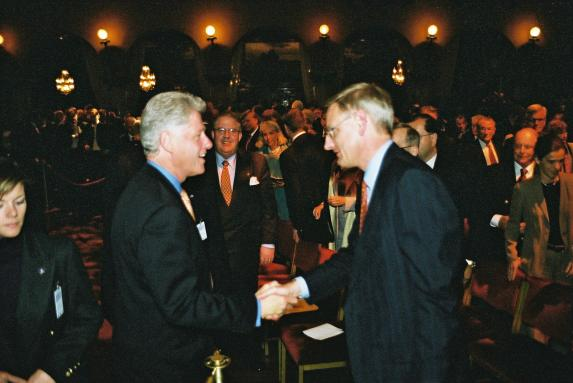

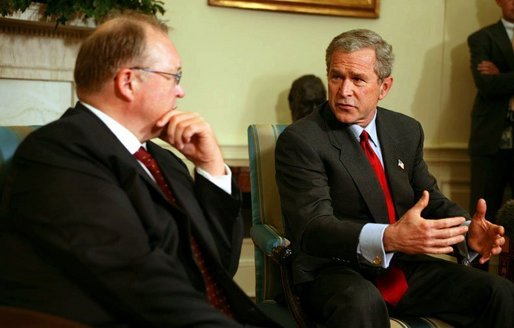

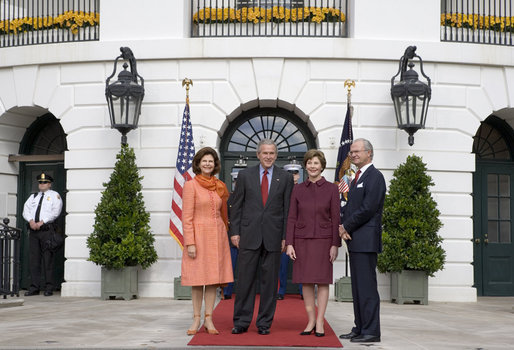

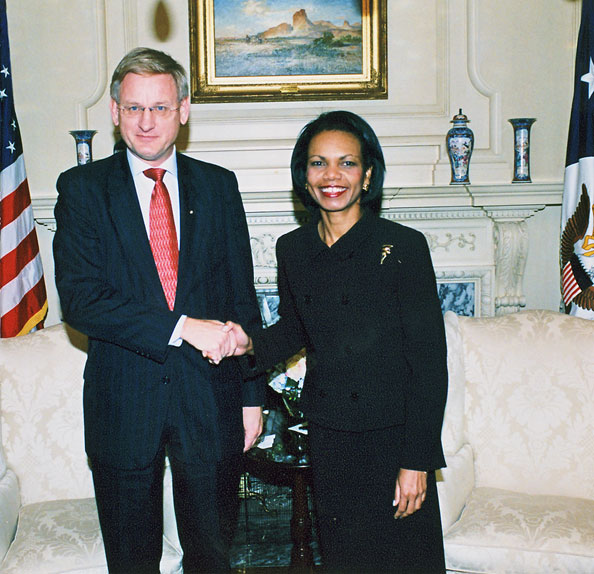

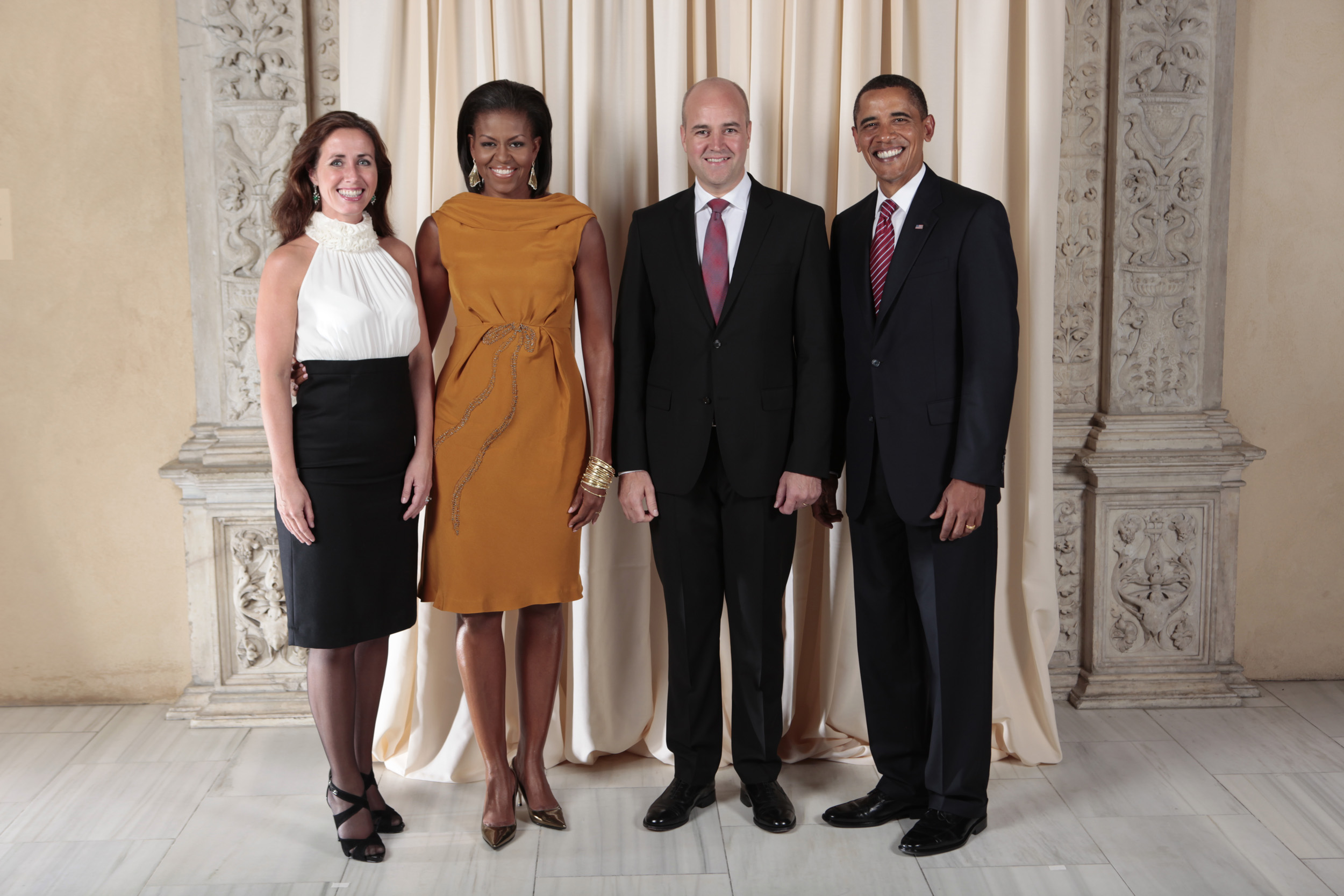

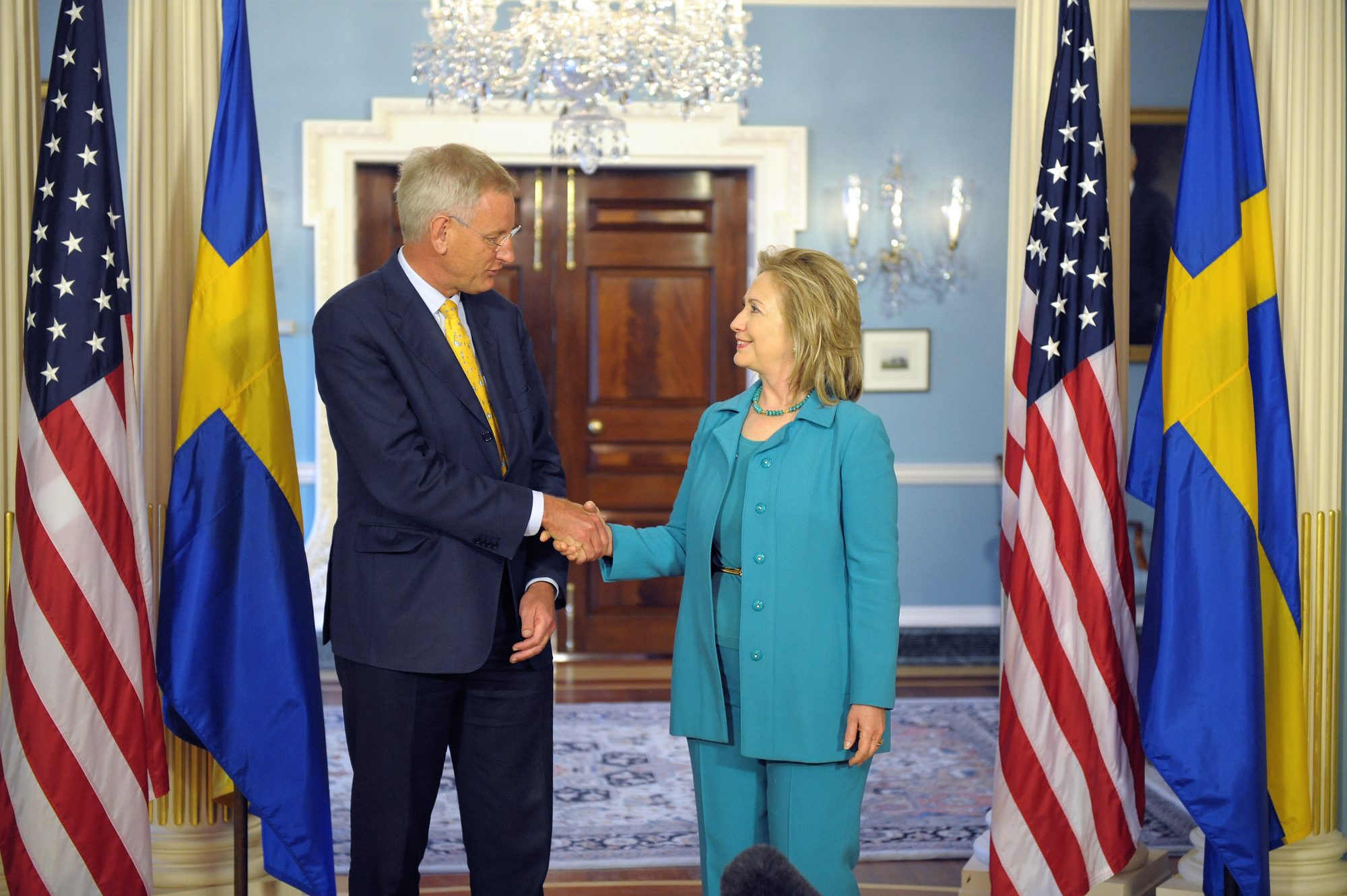

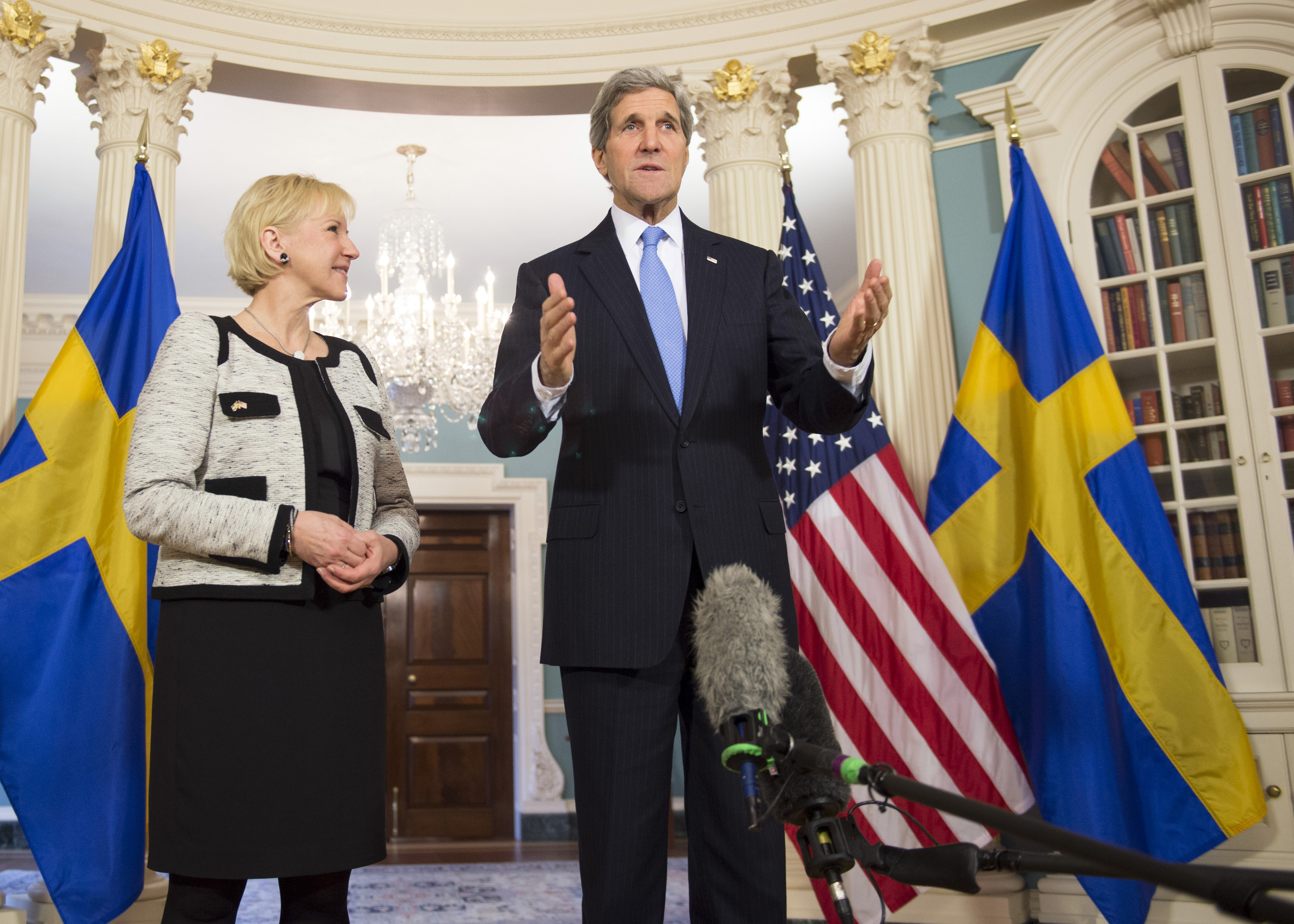

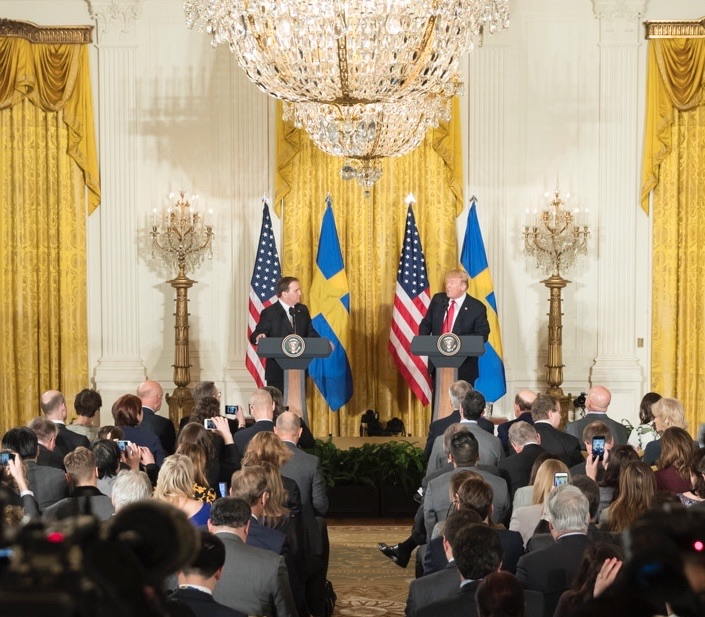

== Switzerland ==
Table of Trips
| Start | End | Guest | Title | Reason |
|---|---|---|---|---|
| April 12, 2010 | April 13, 2010 | Doris Leuthard | President | Attended the Nuclear Security Summit. |
| March 31, 2016 | April 1, 2016 | Johann Schneider-Ammann | President | Attended the Nuclear Security Summit. |
| May 16, 2019 | May 16, 2019 | Ueli Maurer | President | Working visit. |

== Turkey ==
Table of Trips
| Start | End | Guest | Title | Reason |
|---|---|---|---|---|
| January 27, 1954 | January 30, 1954 | Celal Bayar | Prime Minister | At the invitation of the President. Addressed U.S. Congress January 29. Afterwards visited Princeton, New York City, Cleveland and Toledo, Chicago, San Francisco, Los Angeles, Las Vegas, Dallas, and Raleigh.Private visit to New York City February 20.Departed U.S.February 27. |
| June 1, 1954 | June 5, 1954 | Adnan Menderes | Prime Minister | Official visit. Discussed economic and financial matters. |
| October 7, 1959 | October 9, 1959 | Adnan Menderes | Prime Minister | Attended CENTO Ministerial Meeting. |
| November 24, 1963 | November 25, 1963 | İsmet İnönü | Prime Minister | Attended funeral of President Kennedy. |
| June 22, 1964 | June 23, 1964 | İsmet İnönü | Prime Minister | Informal visit. In U.S. June 21. Visited Williamsburg and New York City. |
| April 3, 1967 | April 5, 1967 | Cevdet Sunay | President | State visit. In U.S. April 2–13; visited Philadelphia, Cape Kennedy, Palm Springs, Los Angeles, San Francisco, Kansas City, Chicago, Detroit, Lansing, Niagara Falls, and New York City. |
| March 31, 1969 | April 1, 1969 | Süleyman Demirel | Prime Minister | Attended funeral of former President Eisenhower; met with President Nixon April 1. |
| March 22, 1972 | March 21, 1972 | Nihat Erim | Prime Minister | official visit. In U.S. March 18–23. Also visited New York City. |
| May 30, 1978 | May 31, 1978 | Bülent Ecevit | Prime Minister | Attended NATO Summit conference. |
| April 1, 1985 | April 5, 1985 | Turgut Özal | Prime Minister | Official working visit. |
| February 2, 1987 | February 8, 1987 | Turgut Özal | Prime Minister | Private visit. Met with President Reagan February 5. |
| June 26, 1988 | June 30, 1988 | Kenan Evren | President | State visit; visited New York City, June 30 – July 3. |
| September 25, 1990 | September 25, 1990 | Turgut Özal | President | Met with President Bush during a private visit. |
| March 23, 1991 | March 25, 1991 | Turgut Özal | President | Met with President Bush during a private visit. |
| February 10, 1992 | February 12, 1992 | Süleyman Demirel | Prime Minister | Official working visit. |
| April 28, 1992 | April 30, 1992 | Turgut Özal | President | Met with President Bush during a private visit. |
| February 8, 1993 | February 8, 1993 | Turgut Özal | President | Met with President Clinton during a private visit. Arrived in the U.S. January 26; also visited Fort Lauderdale |
| October 14, 1993 | October 18, 1993 | Tansu Çiller | Prime Minister | Met with President Clinton during a private visit. |
| April 14, 1994 | April 14, 1994 | Tansu Çiller | Prime Minister | Met with President Clinton during a private visit. |
| April 18, 1995 | April 20, 1995 | Tansu Çiller | Prime Minister | Met with President Clinton during a private visit. Arrived in the U.S. April 17 in New York City. Later attended Houston International Festival. |
| October 18, 1995 | October 18, 1995 | Süleyman Demirel | President | Working visit. |
| March 27, 1996 | March 30, 1996 | Süleyman Demirel | President | Working visit. |
| December 18, 1997 | December 21, 1997 | Mesut Yılmaz | Prime Minister | Working visit. |
| April 23, 1999 | April 25, 1999 | Süleyman Demirel | President | Attended NATO's 50th Anniversary Summit |
| September 26, 1999 | September 29, 1999 | Bülent Ecevit | Prime Minister | Official working visit. |
| September 7, 2000 | September 7, 2000 | Ahmet Necdet Sezer | President | Met with President Clinton at the UN Millennium Summit in New York City. |
| January 14, 2002 | January 18, 2002 | Bülent Ecevit | Prime Minister | Working visit. |
| January 27, 2004 | January 28, 2004 | Recep Tayyip Erdoğan | Prime Minister | Working visit. Also visited New York City. |
| June 9, 2004 | June 11, 2004 | Recep Tayyip Erdoğan | Prime Minister | Met with President Bush during the G-8 Economic Summit at Sea Island. Attended the funeral of Former President Reagan. |
| June 7, 2005 | June 8, 2005 | Recep Tayyip Erdoğan | Prime Minister | Working visit. |
| September 30, 2006 | October 2, 2006 | Recep Tayyip Erdoğan | Prime Minister | Working visit. |
| November 4, 2007 | November 5, 2007 | Recep Tayyip Erdoğan | Prime Minister | Working visit. |
| January 7, 2008 | January 8, 2008 | Abdullah Gül | President | Working visit. |
| November 14, 2008 | November 15, 2008 | Recep Tayyip Erdoğan | Prime Minister | Attended the G-20 Economic Summit meeting. |
| September 24, 2009 | September 25, 2009 | Recep Tayyip Erdoğan | Prime Minister | Attended the G-20 Economic Summit meeting. |
| December 7, 2009 | December 7, 2009 | Recep Tayyip Erdoğan | Prime Minister | Working visit. |
| April 12, 2010 | April 13, 2010 | Recep Tayyip Erdoğan | Prime Minister | Attended the Nuclear Security Summit. |
| September 20, 2011 | September 20, 2011 | Recep Tayyip Erdoğan | Prime Minister | Met with President Obama at the UN General Assembly in New York City. |
| May 20, 2012 | May 21, 2012 | Abdullah Gül | President | Working visit. |
| May 20, 2012 | May 21, 2012 | Abdullah Gül | President | Attended the NATO Summit meeting in Chicago. |
| March 31, 2016 | April 1, 2016 | Recep Tayyip Erdoğan | President | Attended the Nuclear Security Summit. |
| May 16, 2017 | May 16, 2017 | Recep Tayyip Erdoğan | President | Official working visit. |
| November 13, 2019 | November 13, 2019 | Recep Tayyip Erdoğan | President | Official working visit. |
| July 10, 2024 | July 11, 2024 | Recep Tayyip Erdoğan | President | Attended NATO 75th Anniversary Summit in Washington, D.C. |

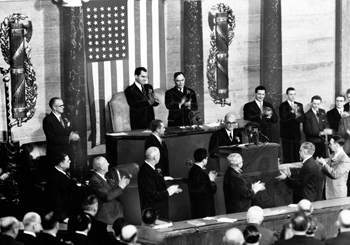

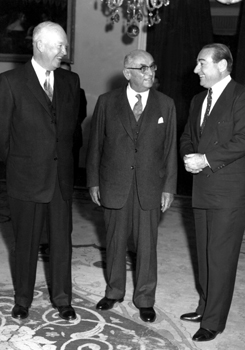

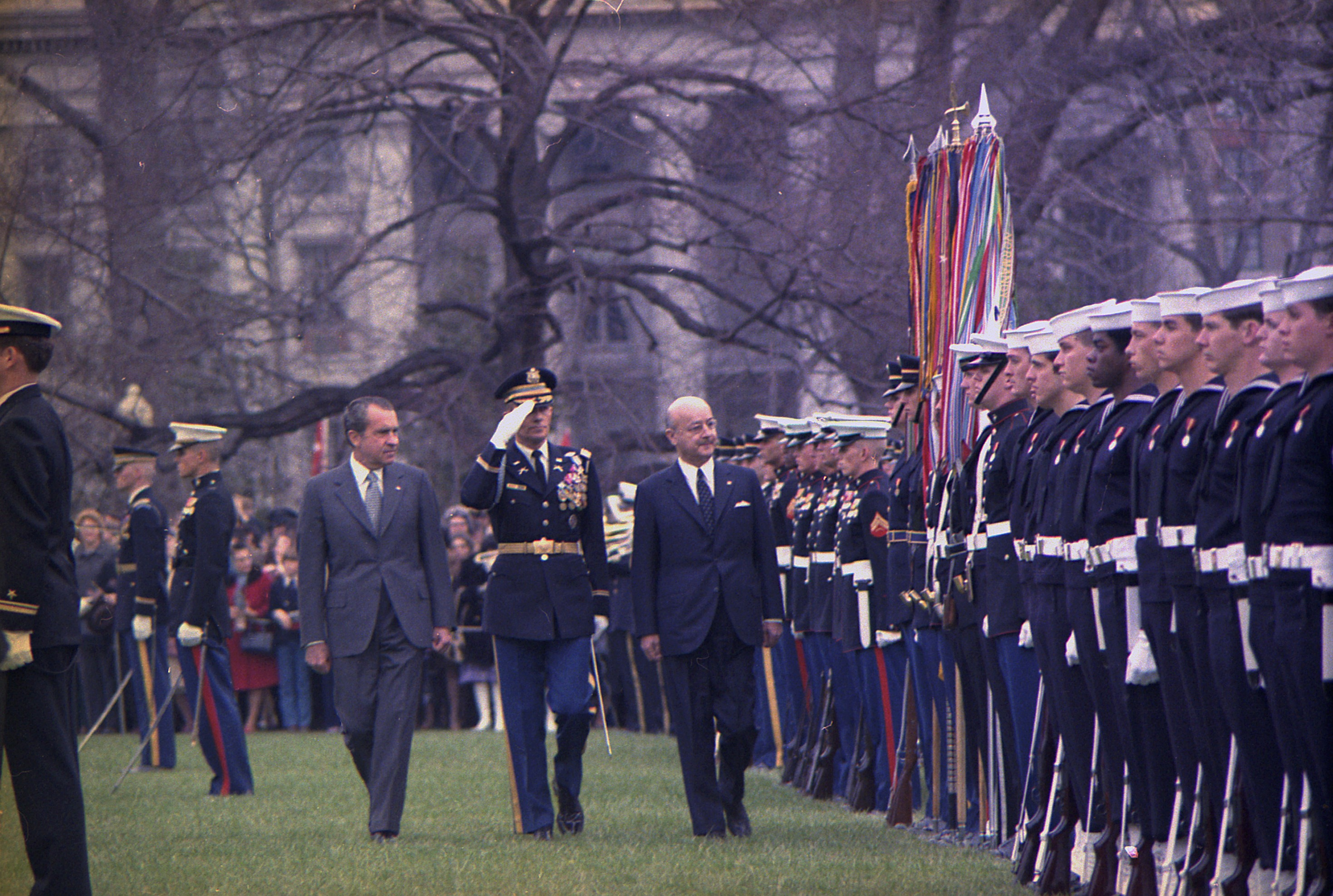

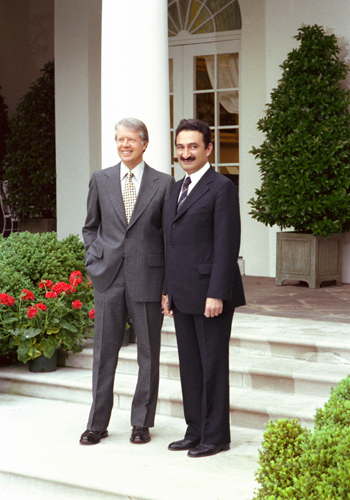

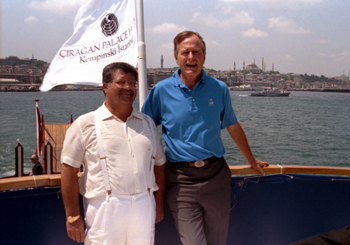

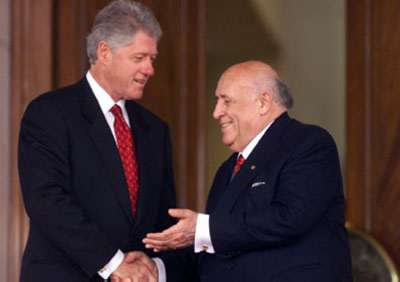

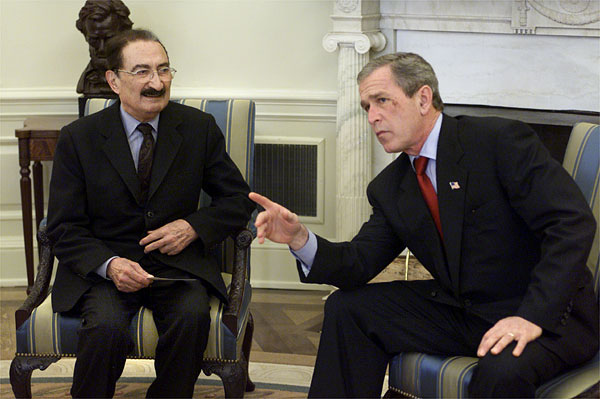

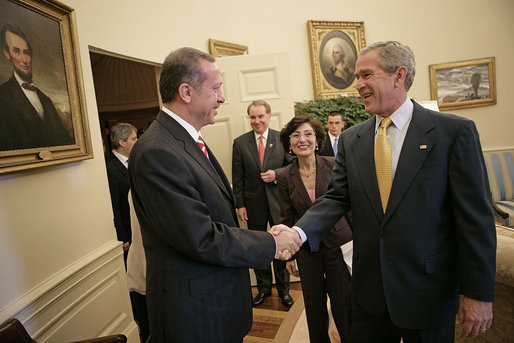

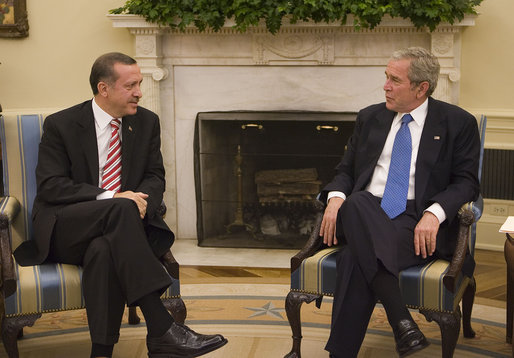

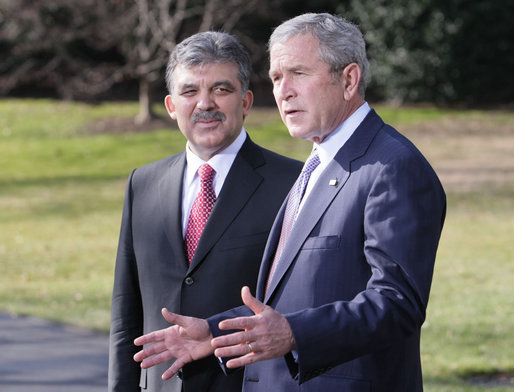

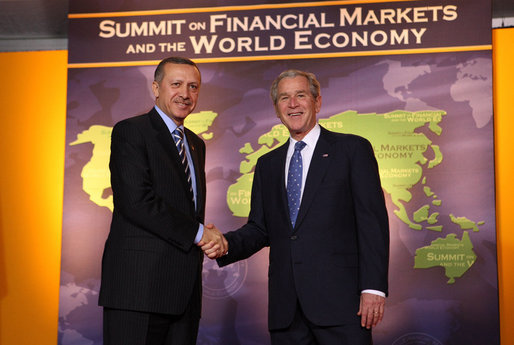

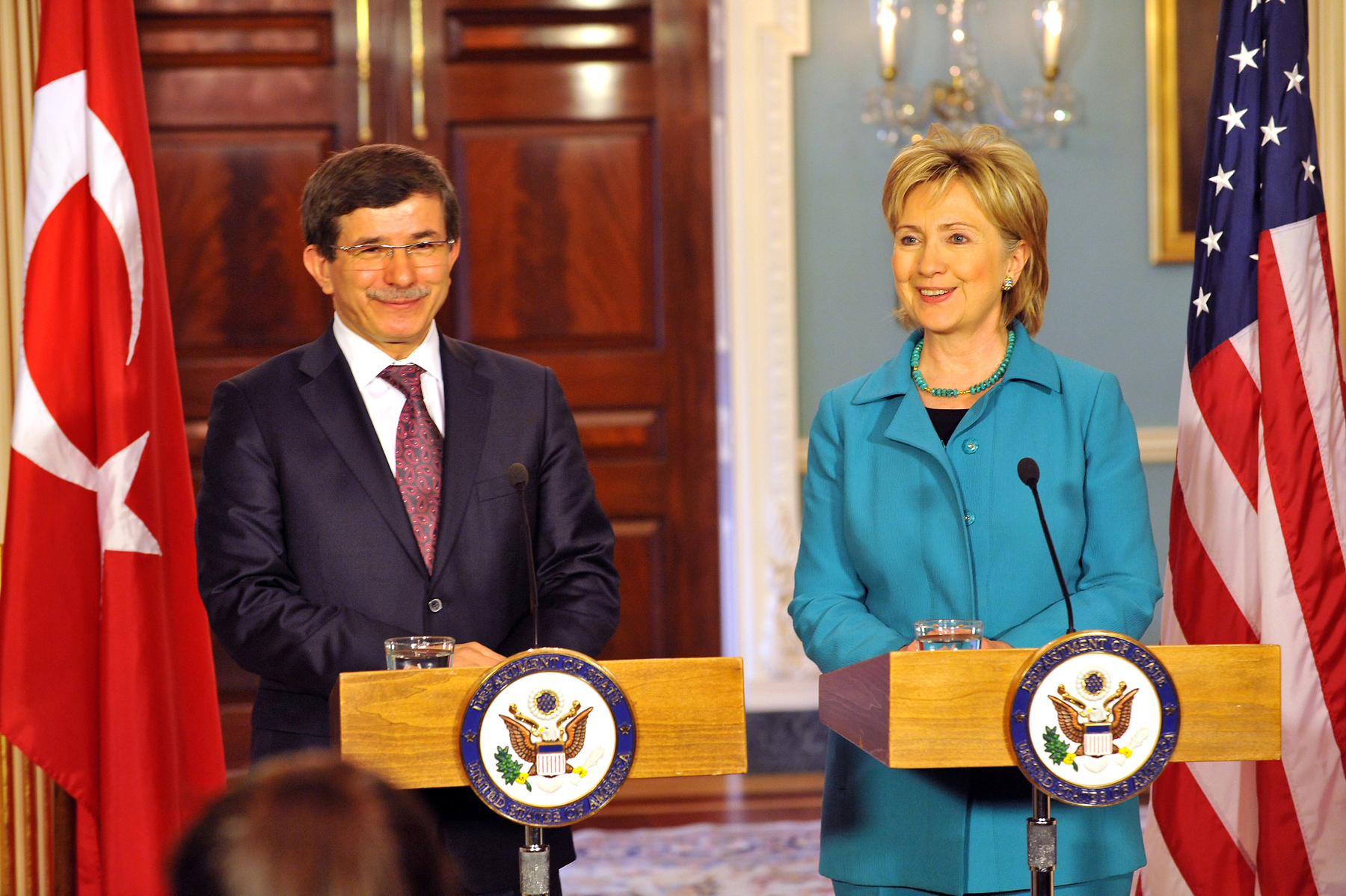

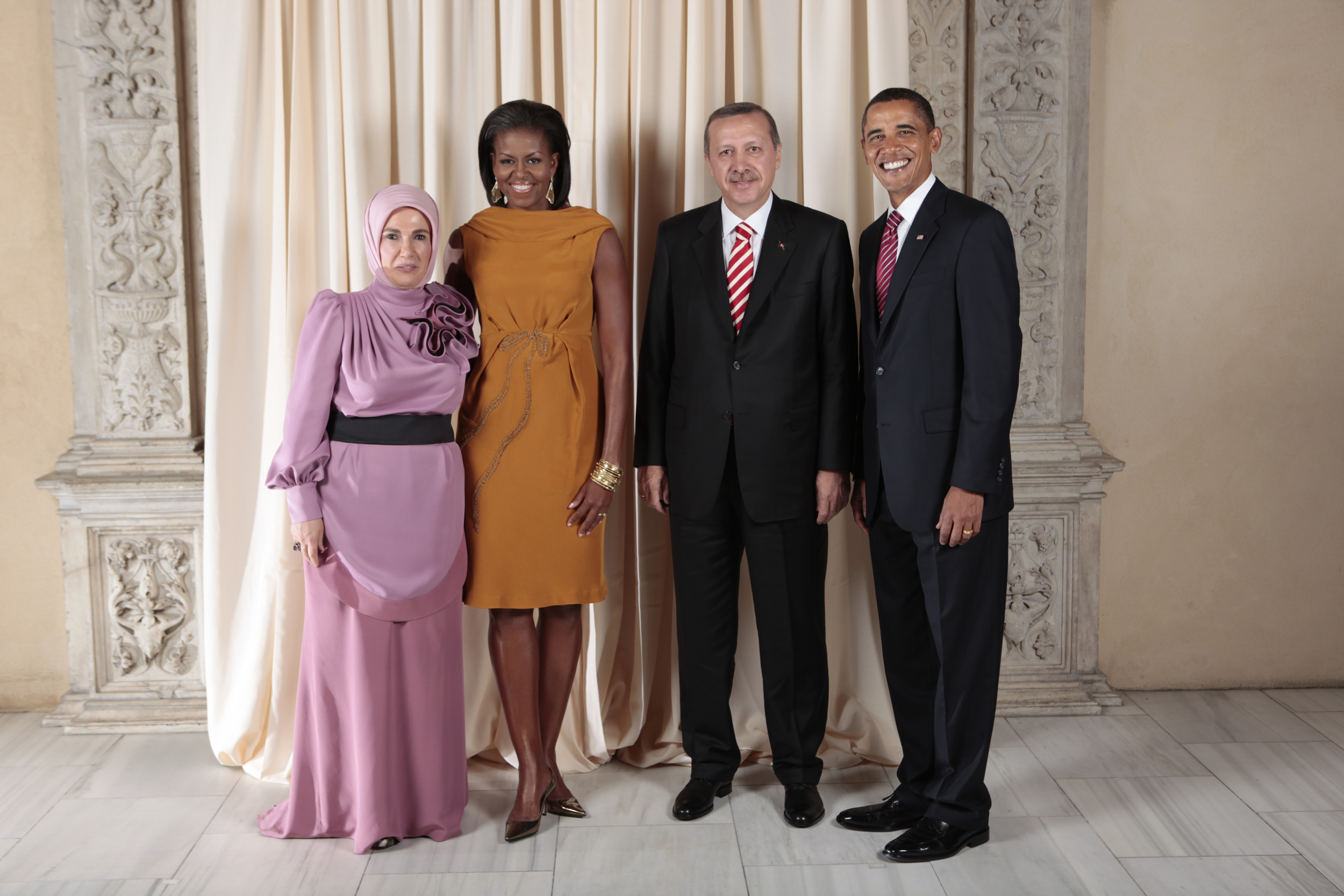

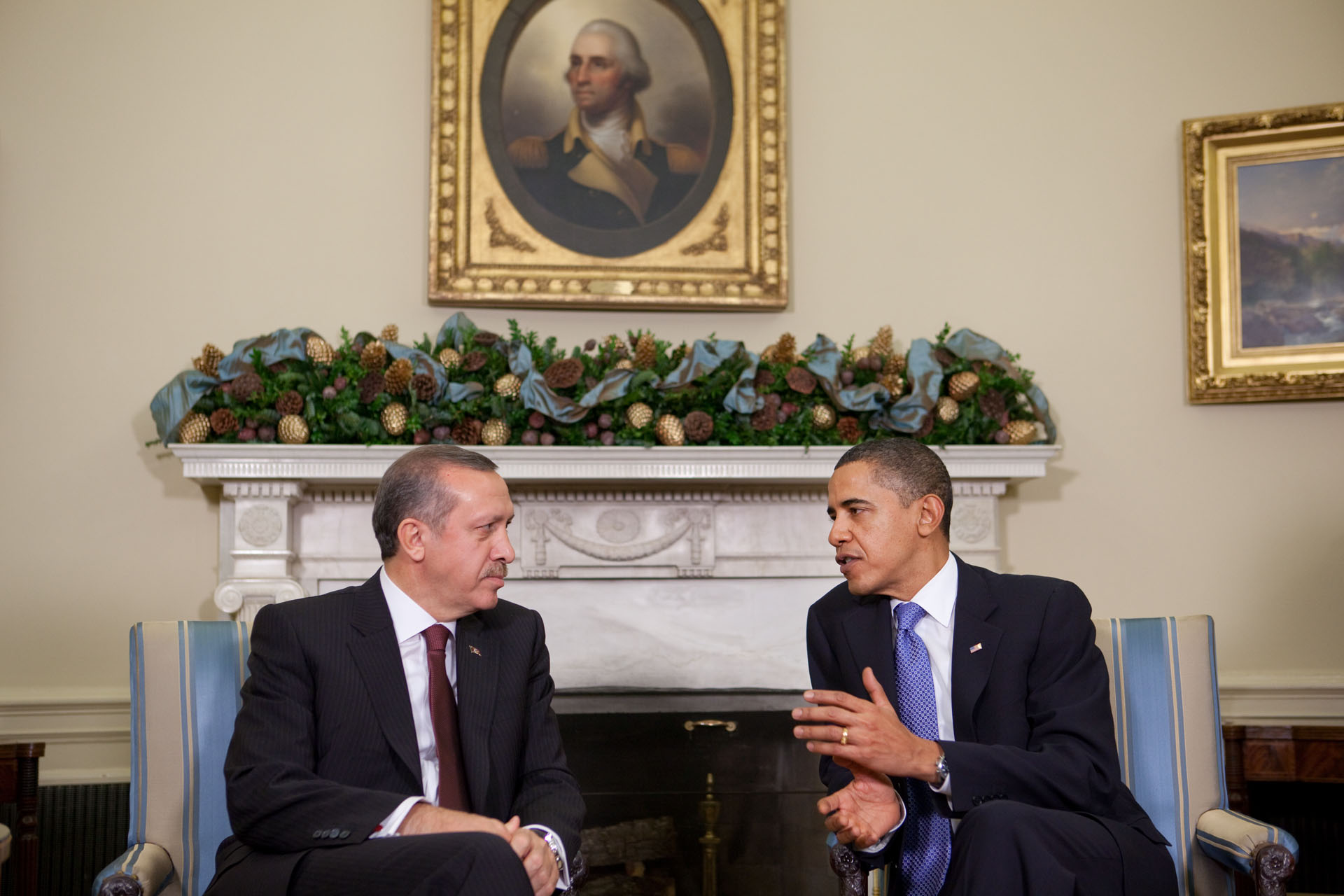

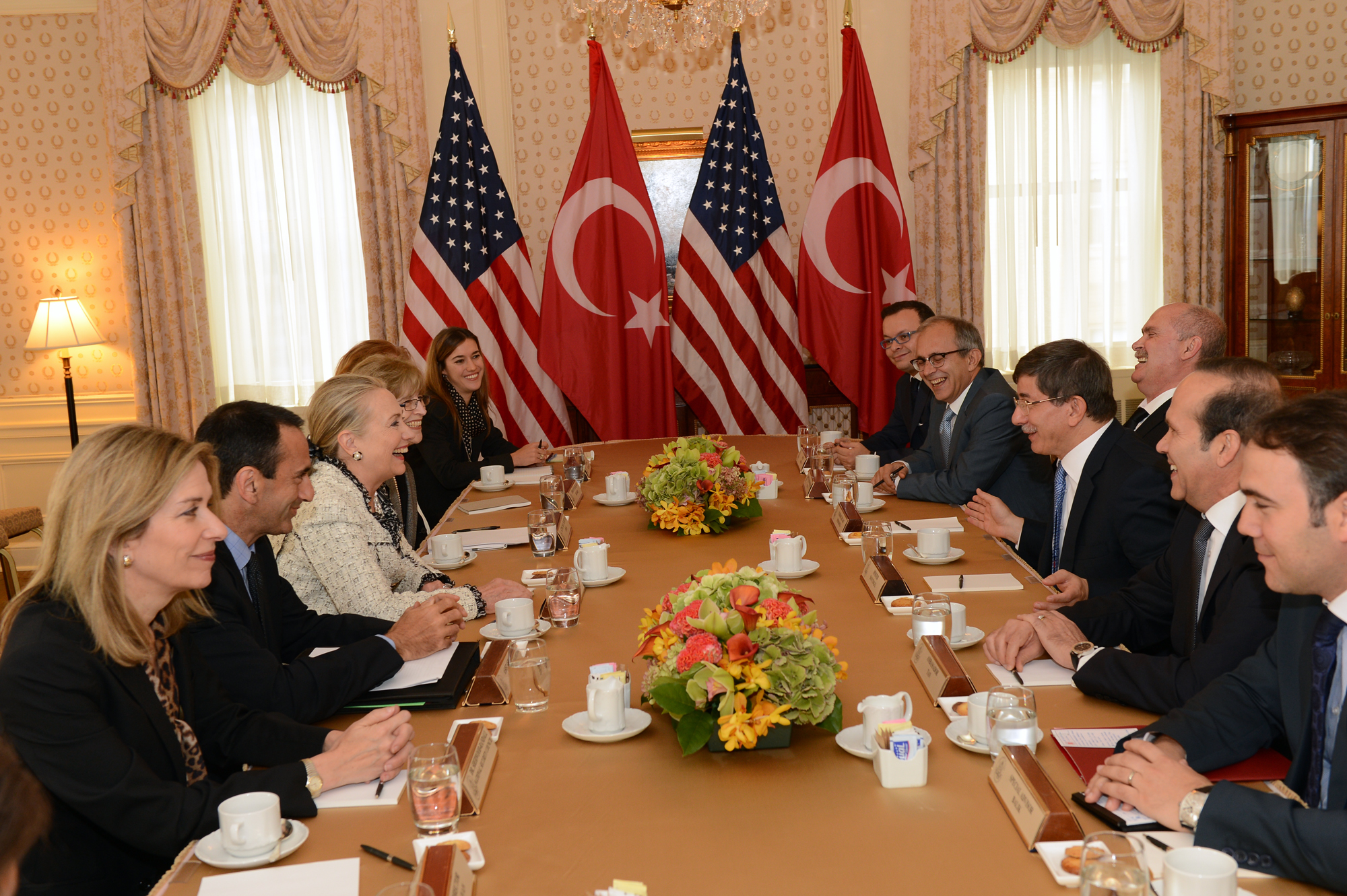

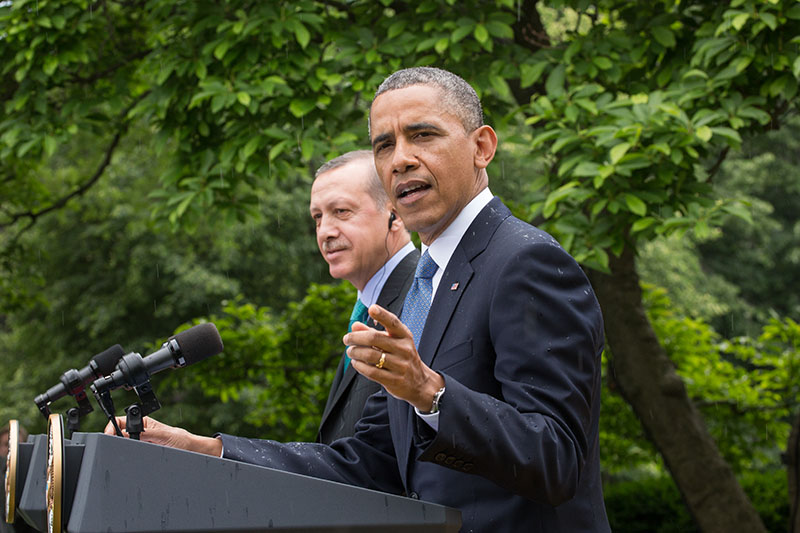

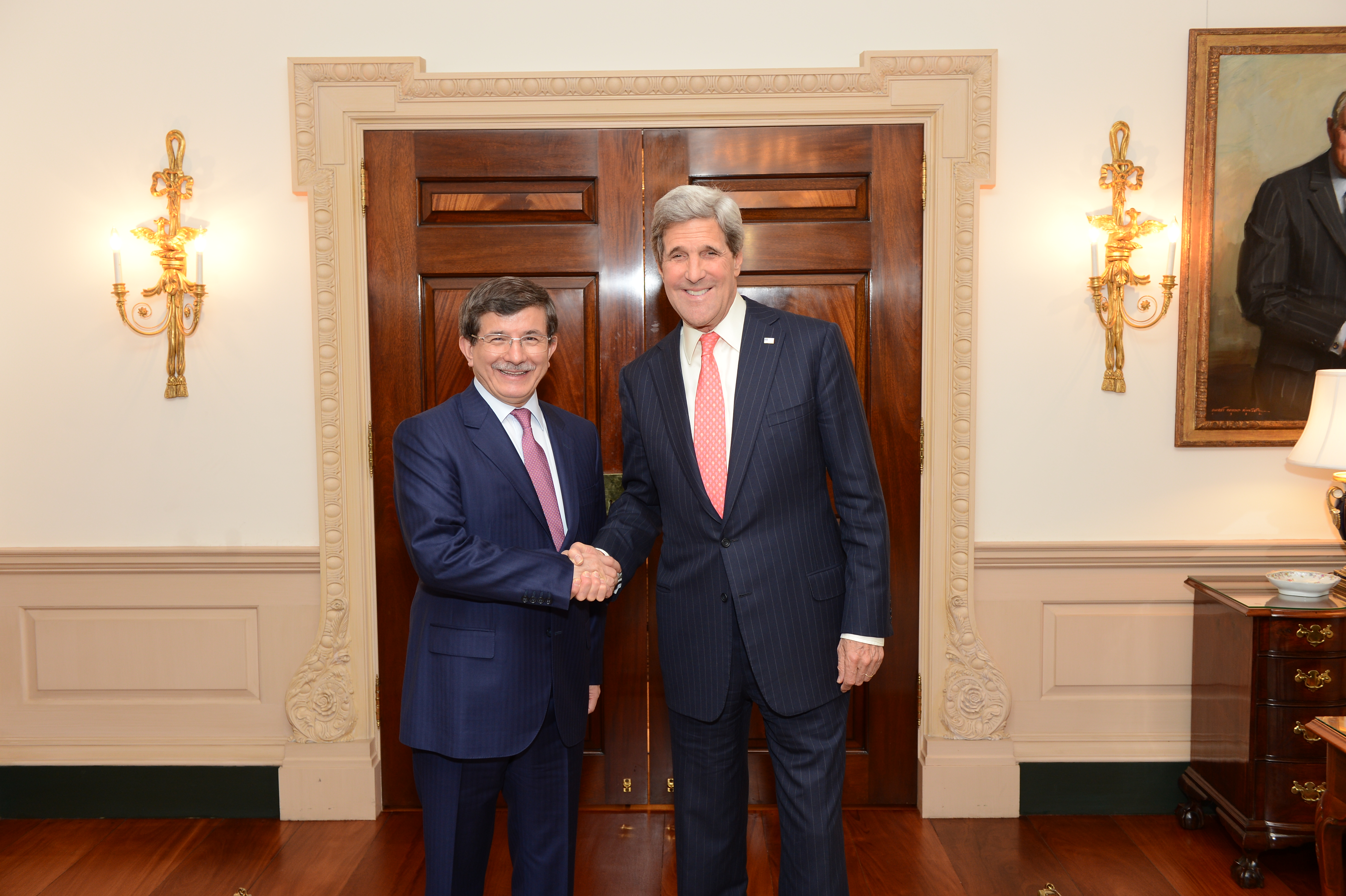

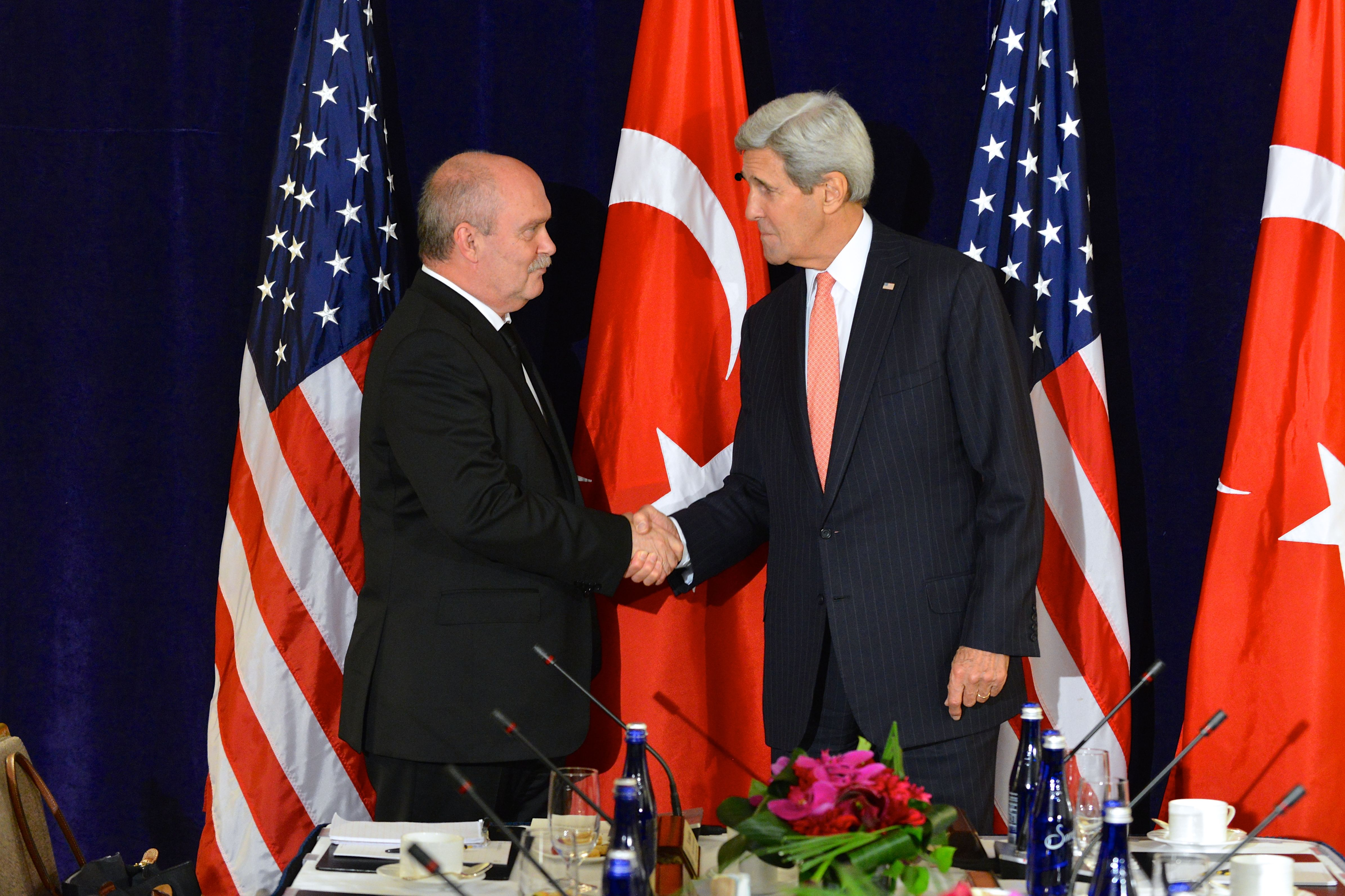

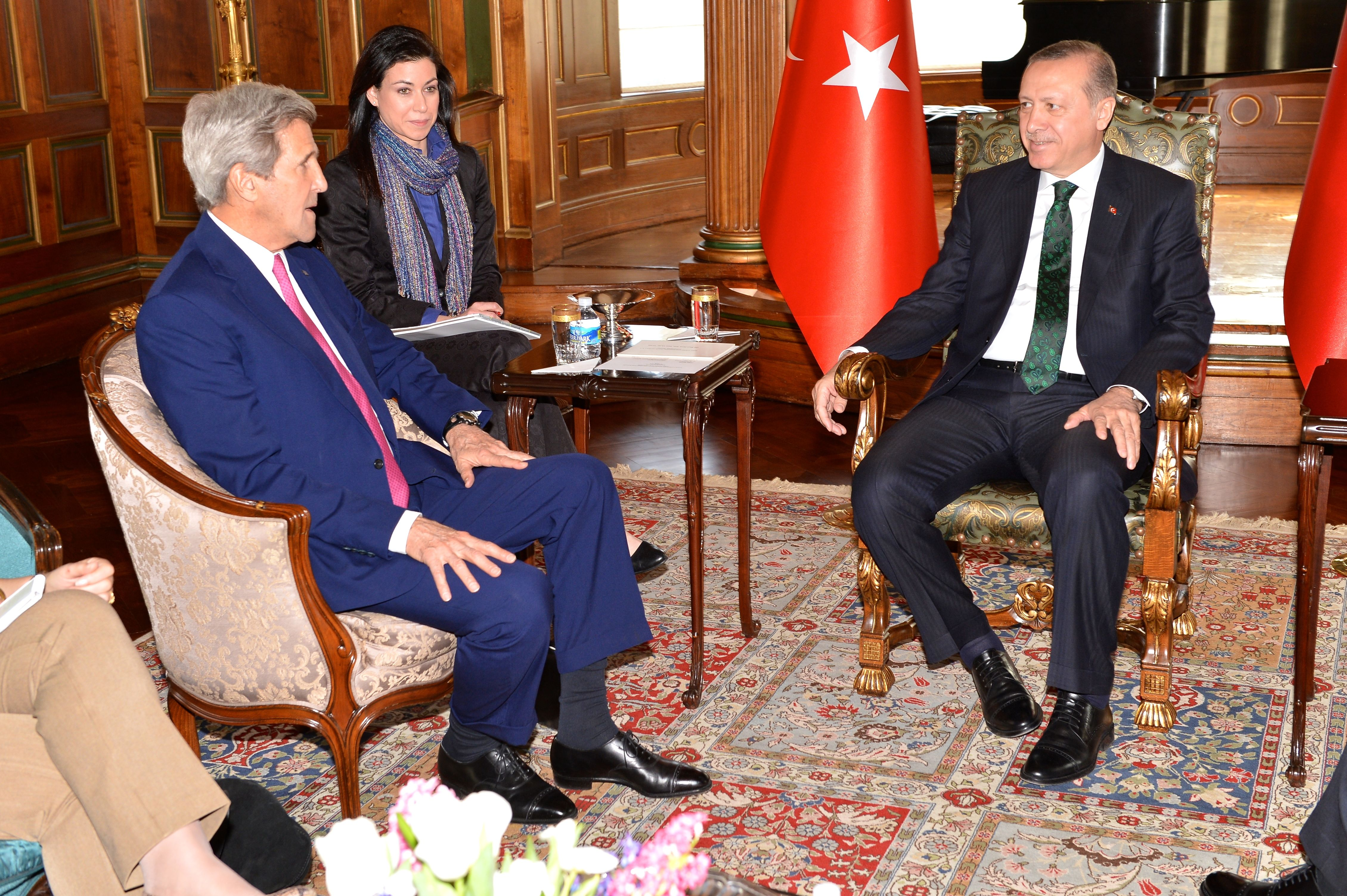

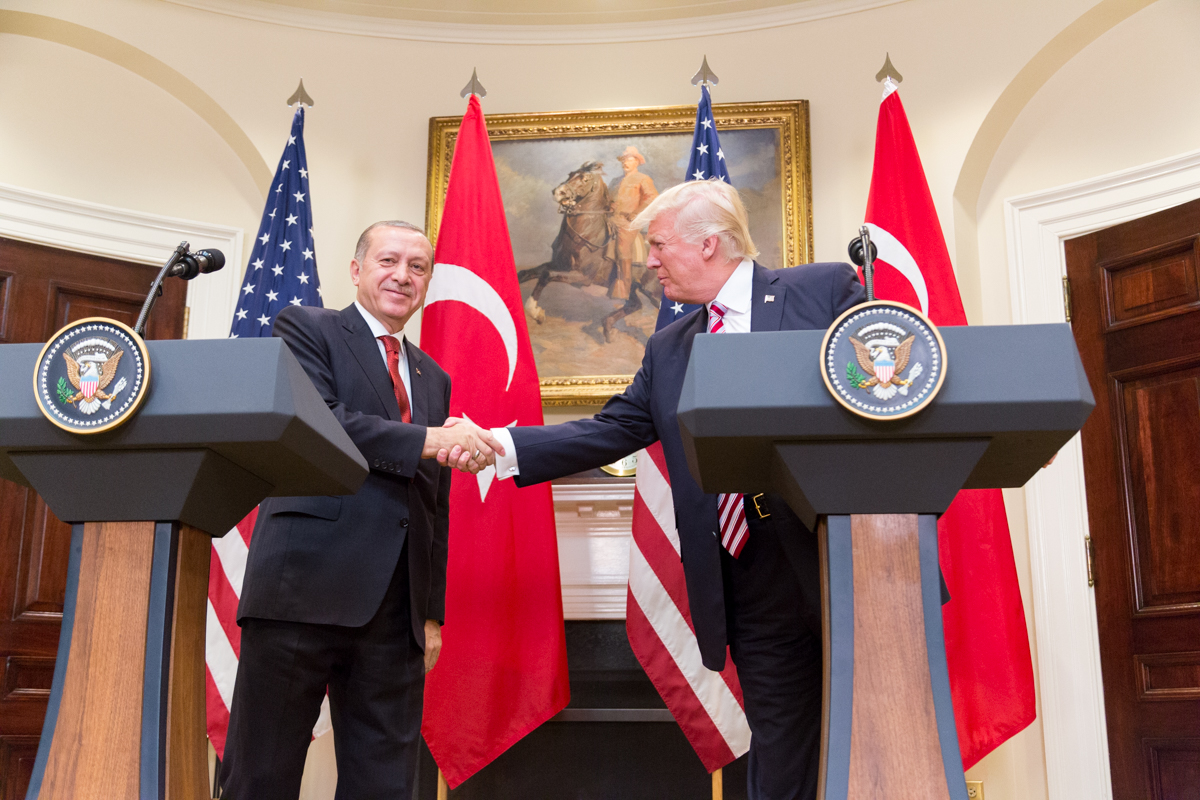

== Ukraine ==
Table of Trips
| Start | End | Guest | Title | Reason |
|---|---|---|---|---|
| May 5, 1992 | May 7, 1992 | Leonid Kravchuk | President | Official working visit. |
| March 3, 1994 | March 5, 1994 | Leonid Kravchuk | President | Working visit. |
| November 21, 1994 | November 23, 1994 | Leonid Kuchma | President | State Visit. |
| February 20, 1996 | February 22, 1996 | Leonid Kuchma | President | Met with President Clinton during a private visit. |
| May 14, 1997 | May 16, 1997 | Leonid Kuchma | President | Attended meeting of the U.S.-Ukraine Binational Commission. |
| April 23, 1999 | April 25, 1999 | Leonid Kuchma | President | Attended NATO's 50th Anniversary Summit. |
| December 7, 1999 | December 8, 1999 | Leonid Kuchma | President | Working visit. |
| April 4, 2005 | April 5, 2005 | Victor Yushchenko | President | Working visit. |
| September 28, 2008 | September 29, 2008 | Victor Yushchenko | President | Working visit. |
| April 12, 2010 | April 13, 2010 | Victor Yanukovych | President | Attended the Nuclear Security Summit. |
| May 20, 2012 | May 21, 2012 | Victor Yanukovych | President | Attended the NATO Summit meeting in Chicago. |
| March 12, 2014 | March 13, 2014 | Arseniy Yatsenyuk | Prime Minister | Working visit. |
| September 18, 2014 | September 18, 2014 | Petro Poroshenko | President | Working visit. |
| July 13, 2015 | July 13, 2015 | Arseniy Yatsenyuk | Prime Minister | Official Working visit. |
| March 31, 2016 | April 1, 2016 | Petro Poroshenko | President | Attended the Nuclear Security Summit. |
| June 20, 2017 | June 20, 2017 | Petro Poroshenko | President | Official Working Visit. |
| September 25, 2019 | September 25, 2019 | Volodymyr Zelenskyy | President | Met with President Trump at the UN General Assembly in New York City. |
| August 31, 2021 | August 31, 2021 | Volodymyr Zelenskyy | President | Working Visit. |
| December 21, 2022 | December 21, 2022 | Volodymyr Zelenskyy | President | Working Visit. |
| September 21, 2023 | September 21, 2023 | Volodymyr Zelenskyy | President | Official Working Visit. |
| December 12, 2023 | December 12, 2023 | Volodymyr Zelenskyy | President | Official Working Visit. |
| July 10, 2024 | July 11, 2024 | Volodymyr Zelenskyy | President | Attended NATO 75th Anniversary Summit in Washington, D.C. |
| September 25, 2024 | September 25, 2024 | Volodymyr Zelenskyy | President | Met with President Biden at the UN General Assembly in New York City. |
| September 26, 2024 | September 26, 2024 | Volodymyr Zelenskyy | President | Working Visit. |
| February 28, 2025 | February 28, 2025 | Volodymyr Zelenskyy | President | Working Visit. |

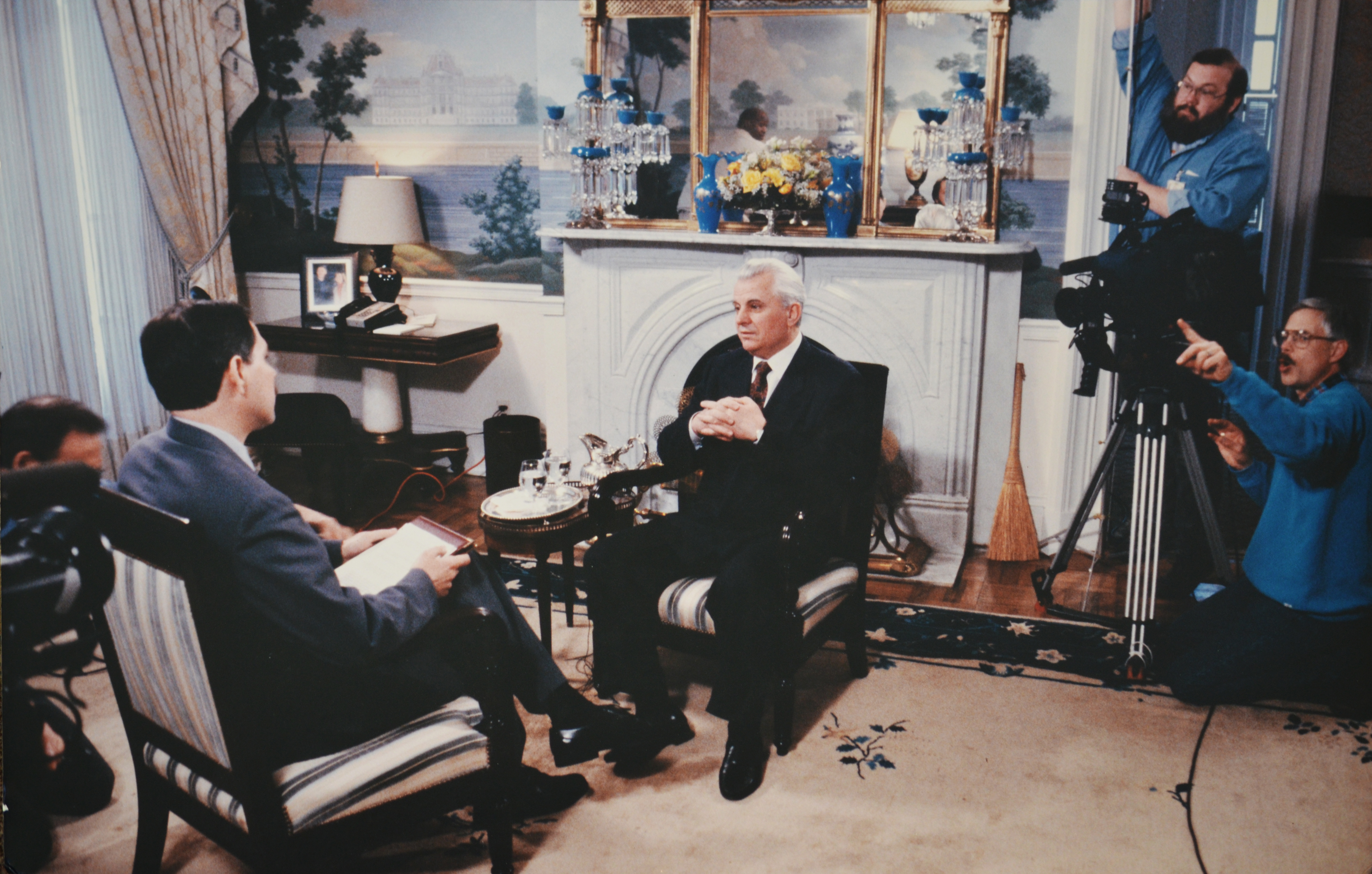

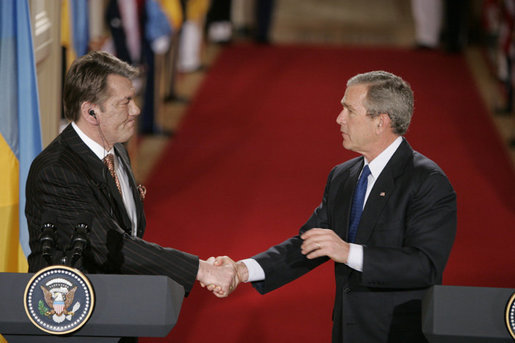

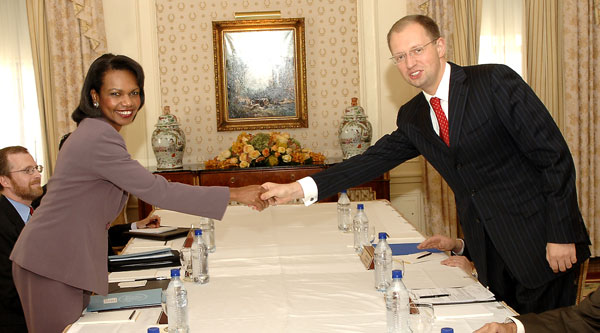

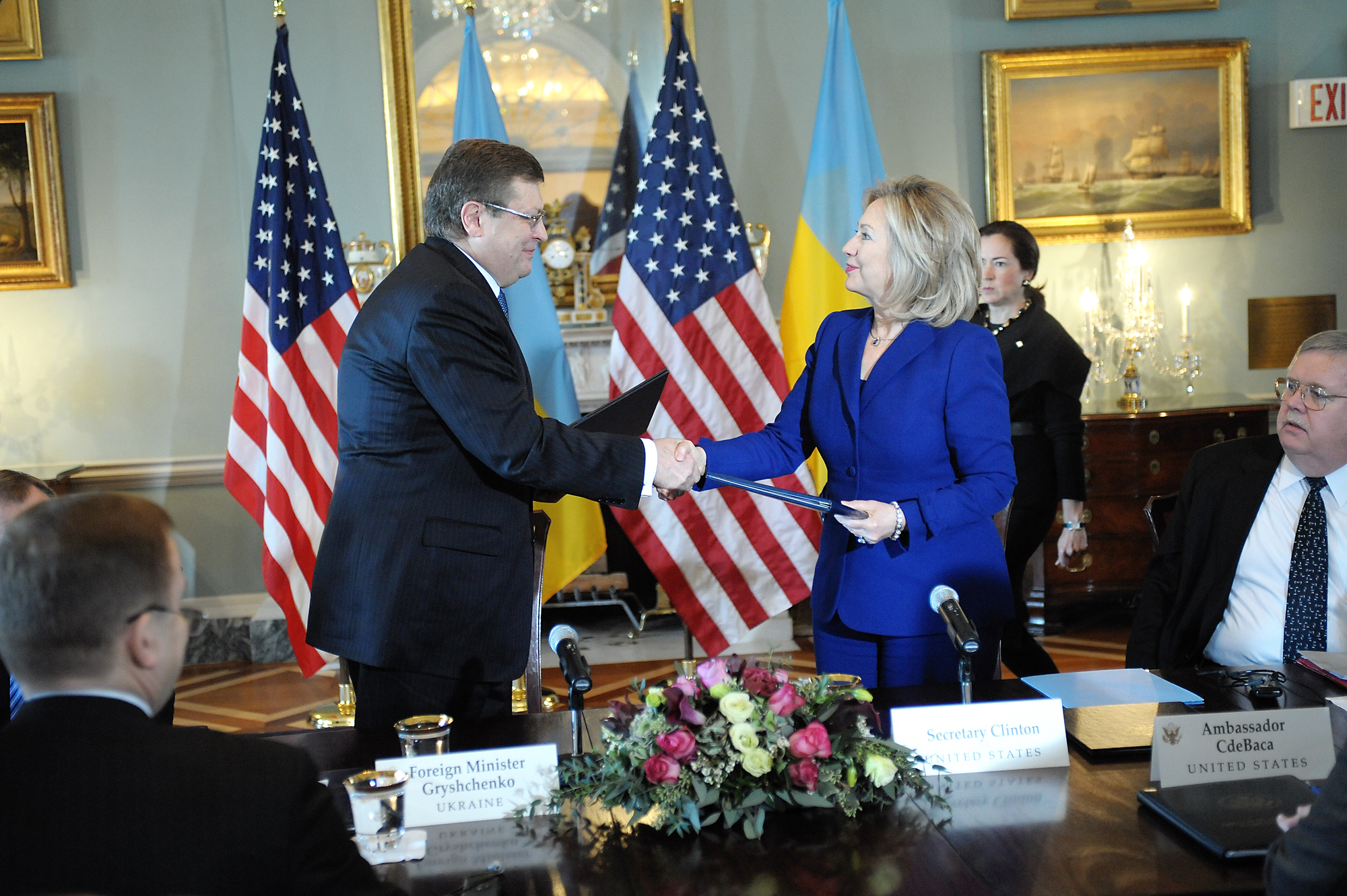

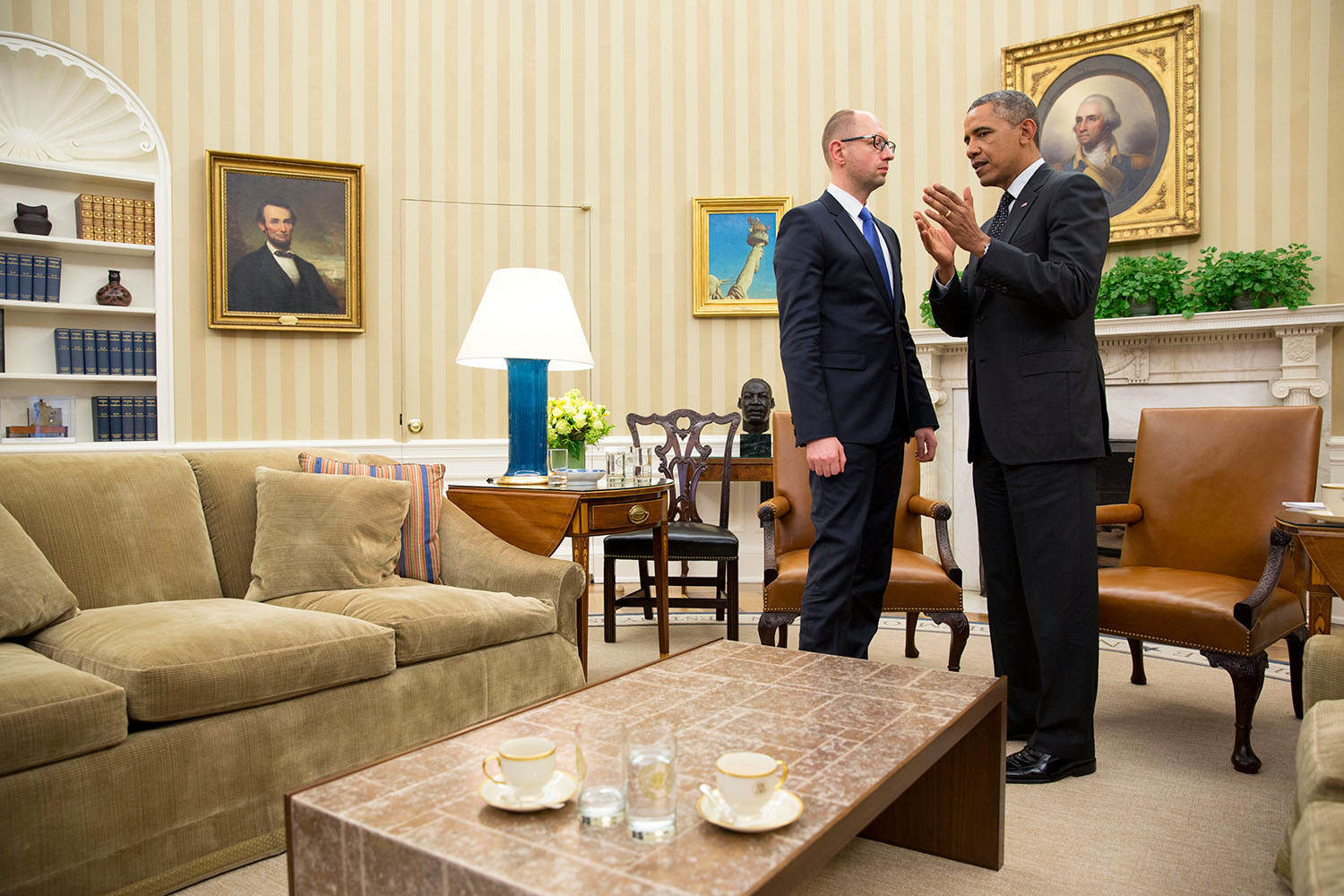

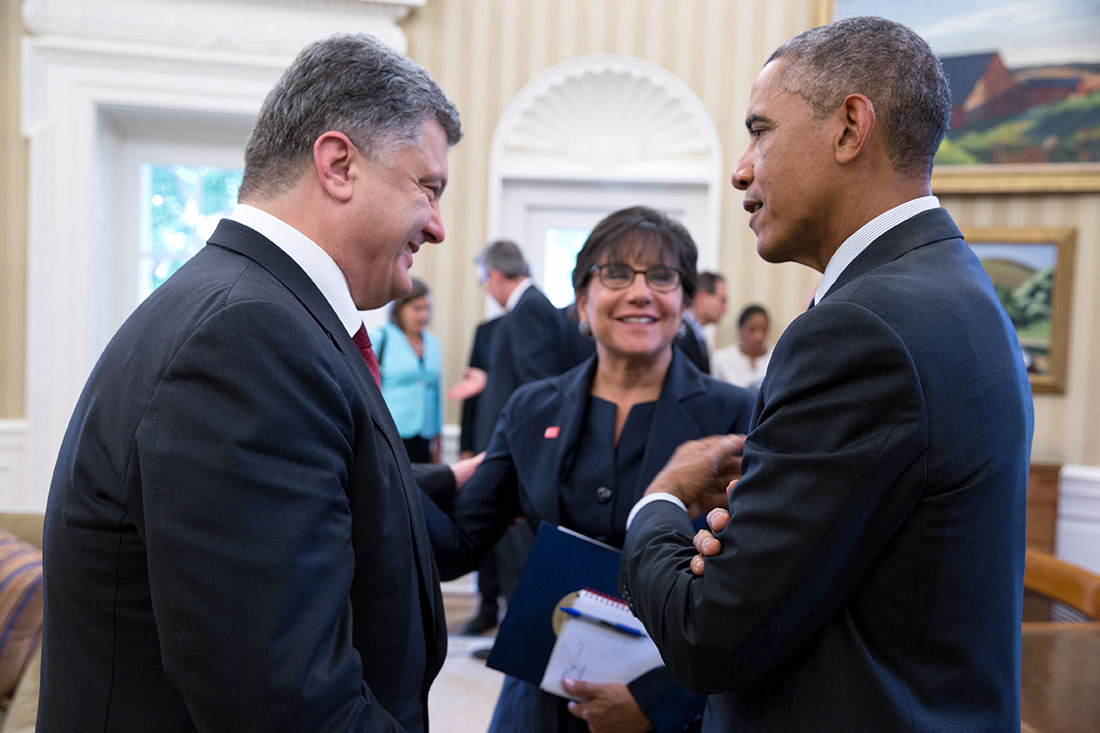

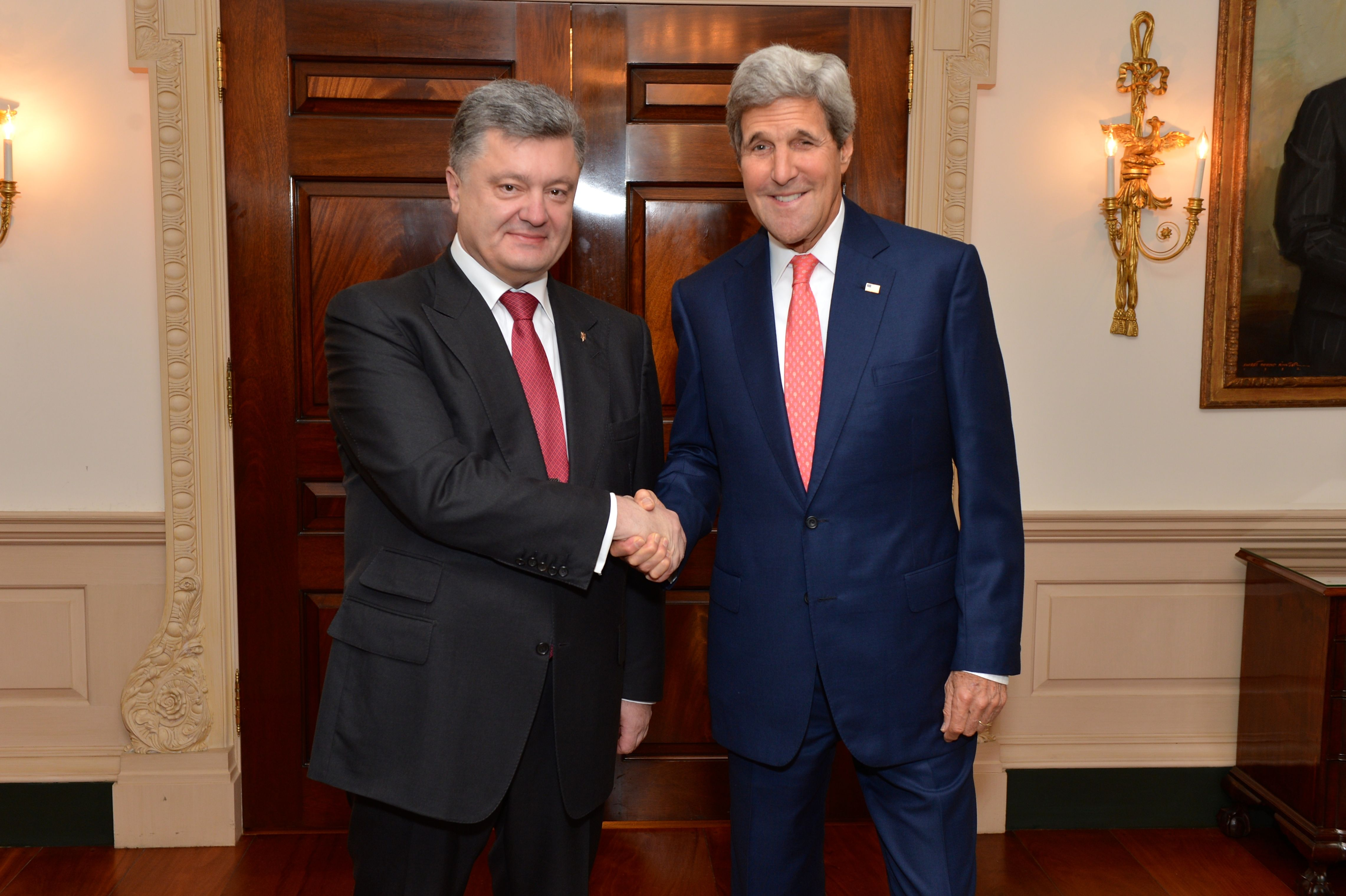

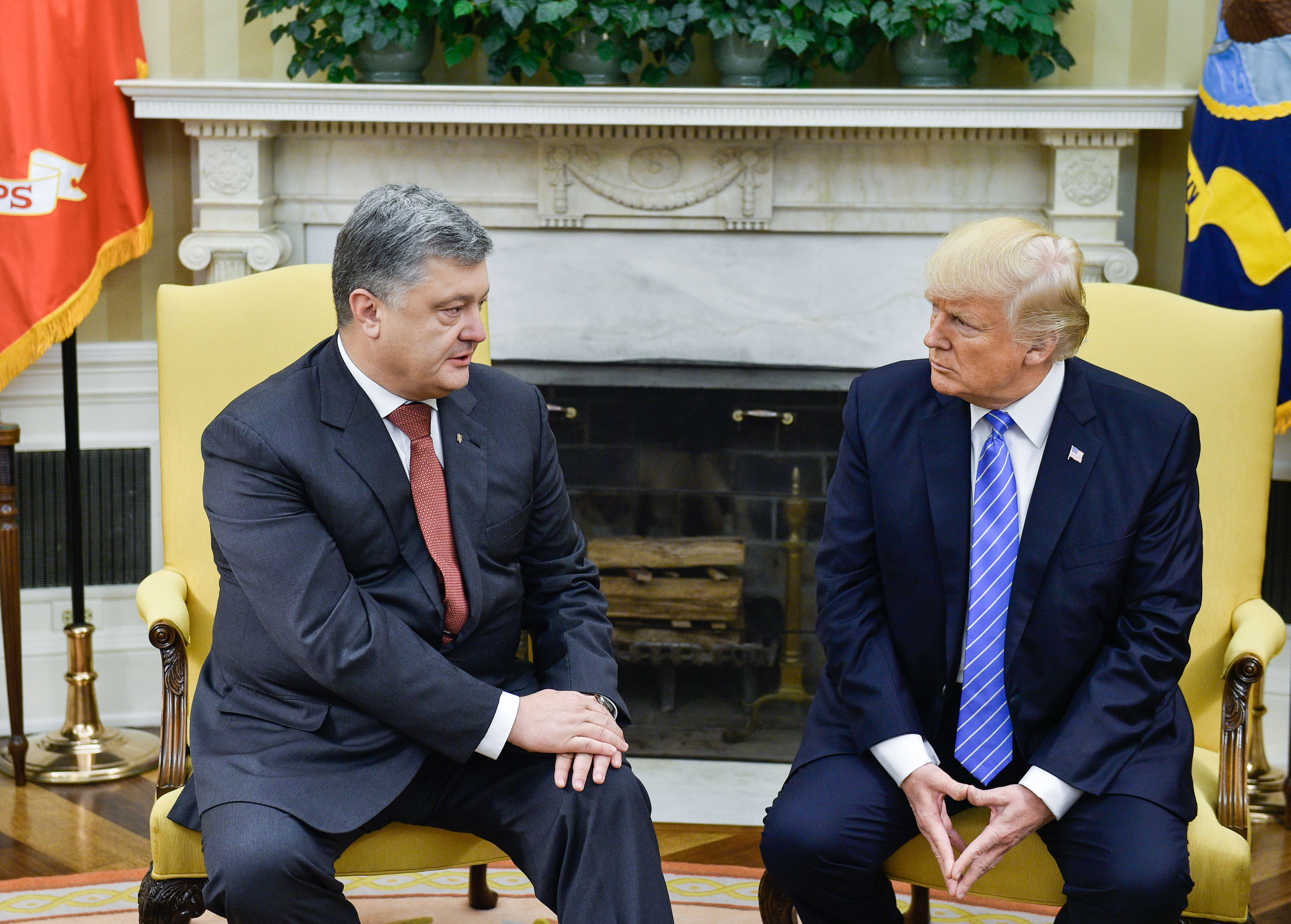

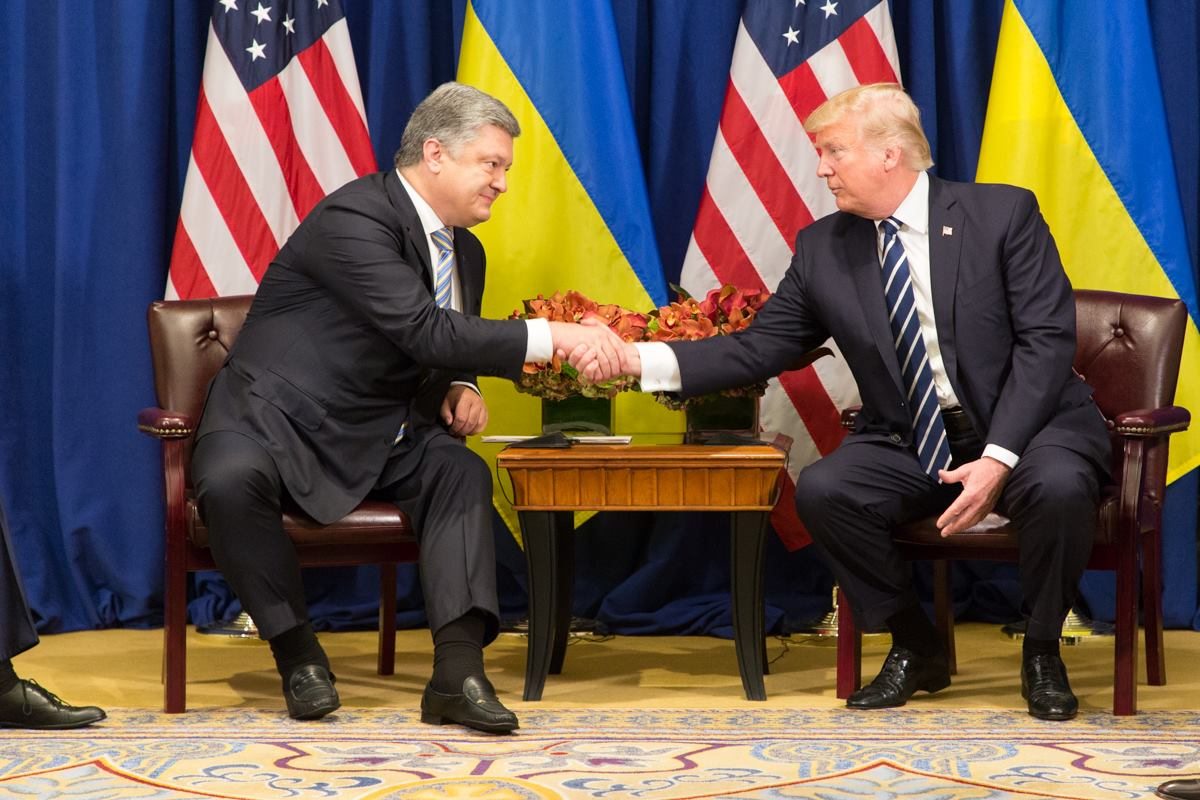

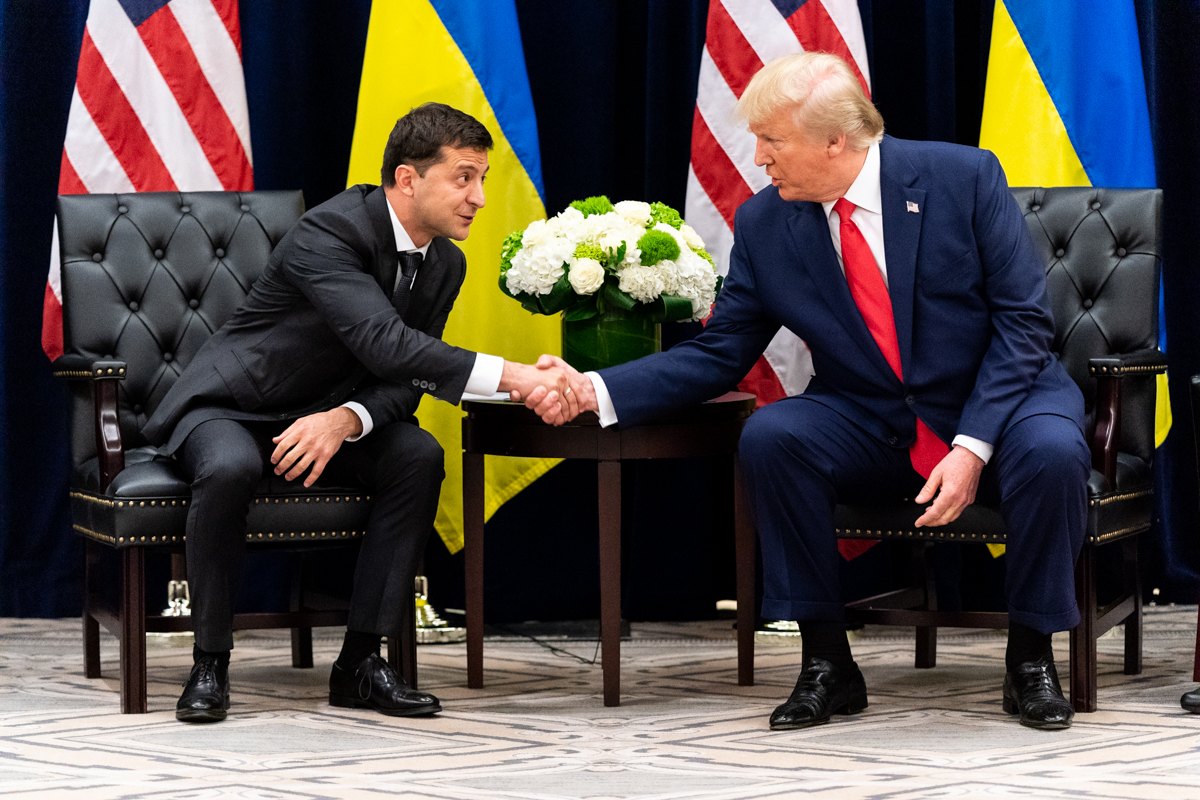

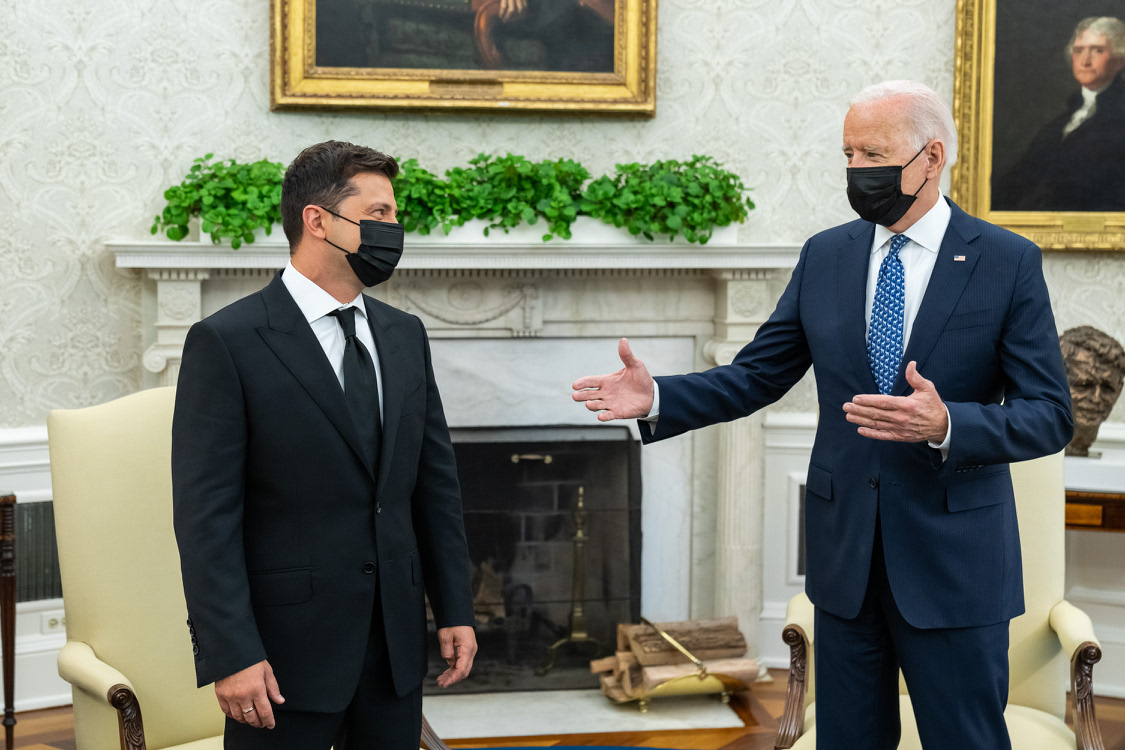

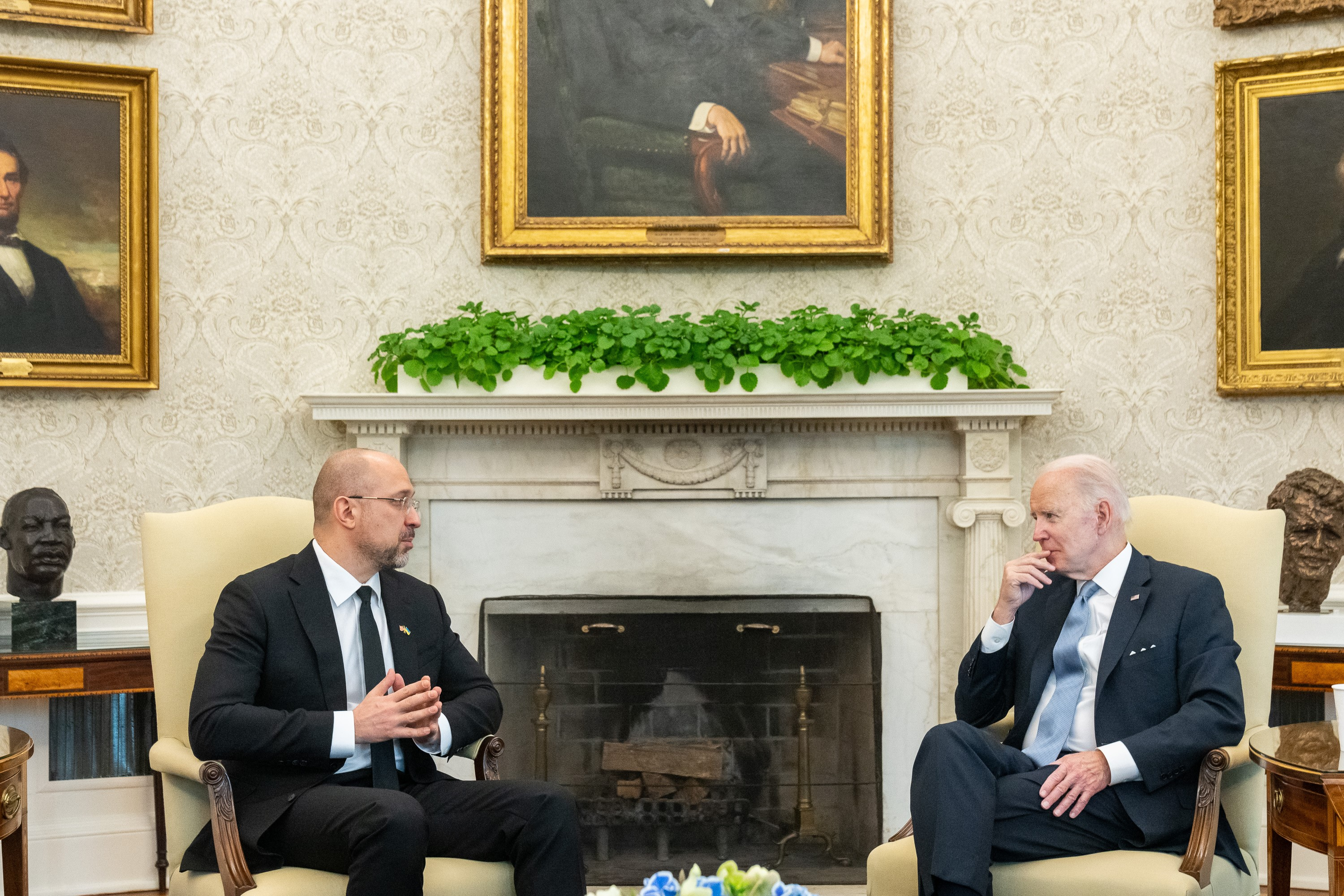

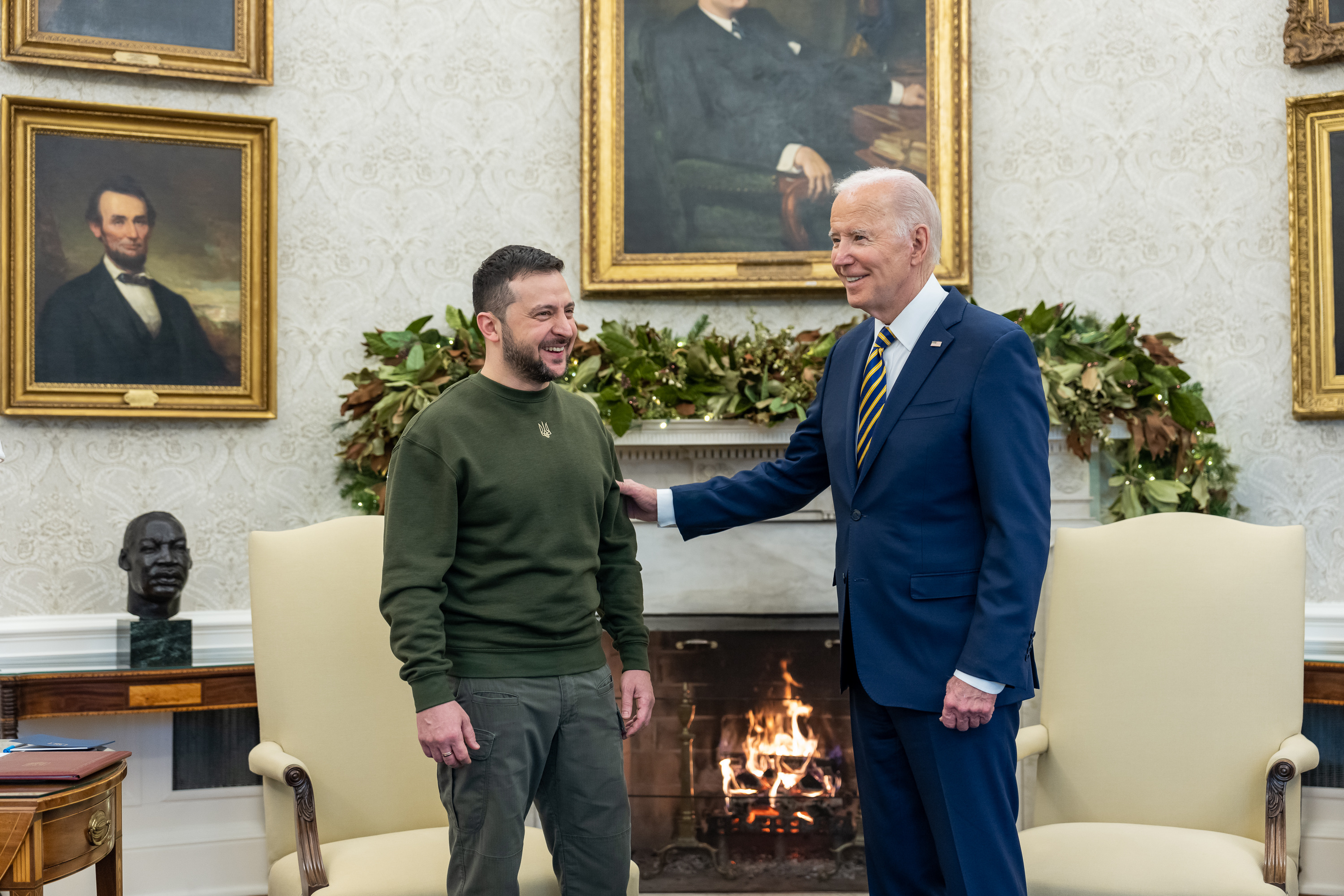

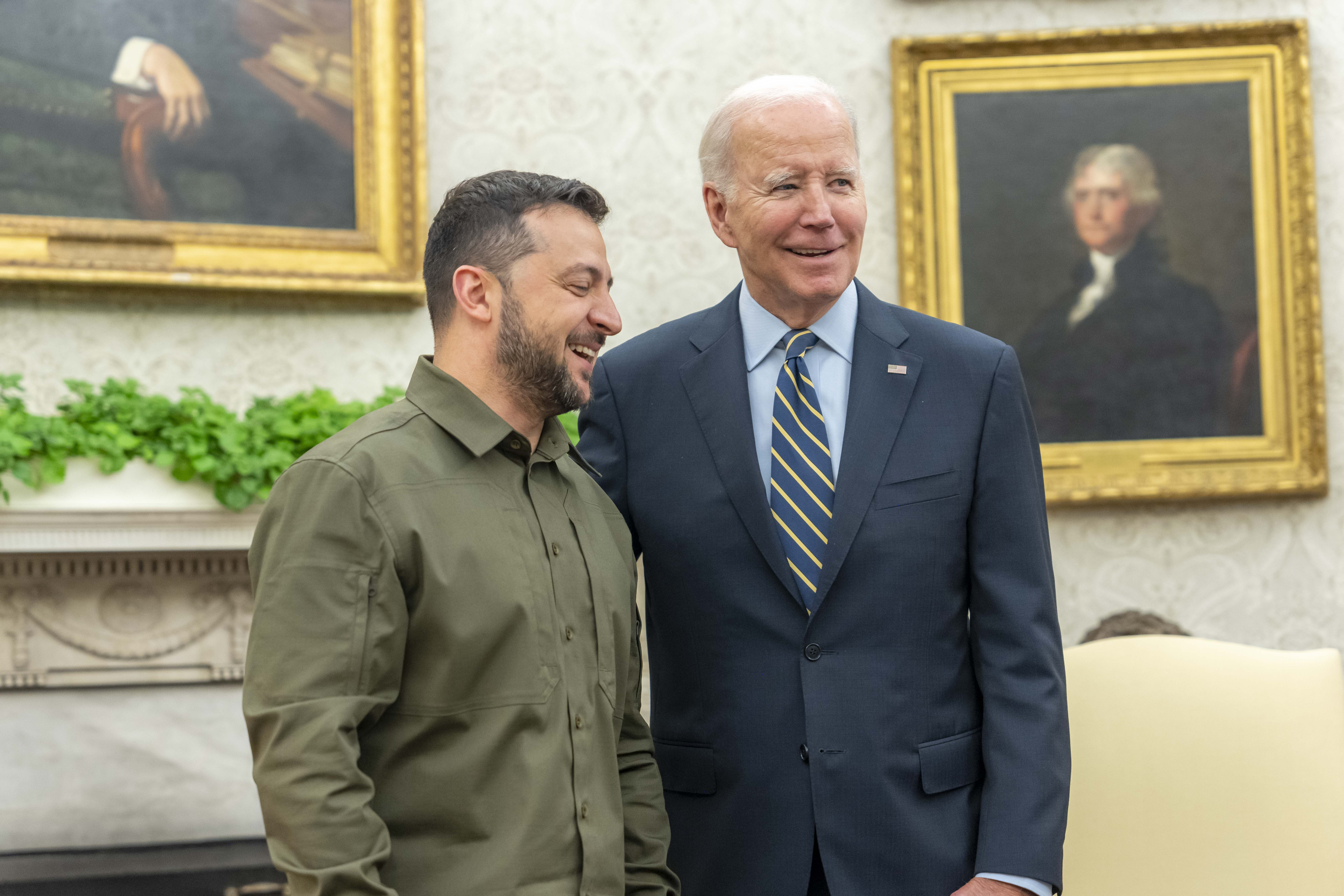

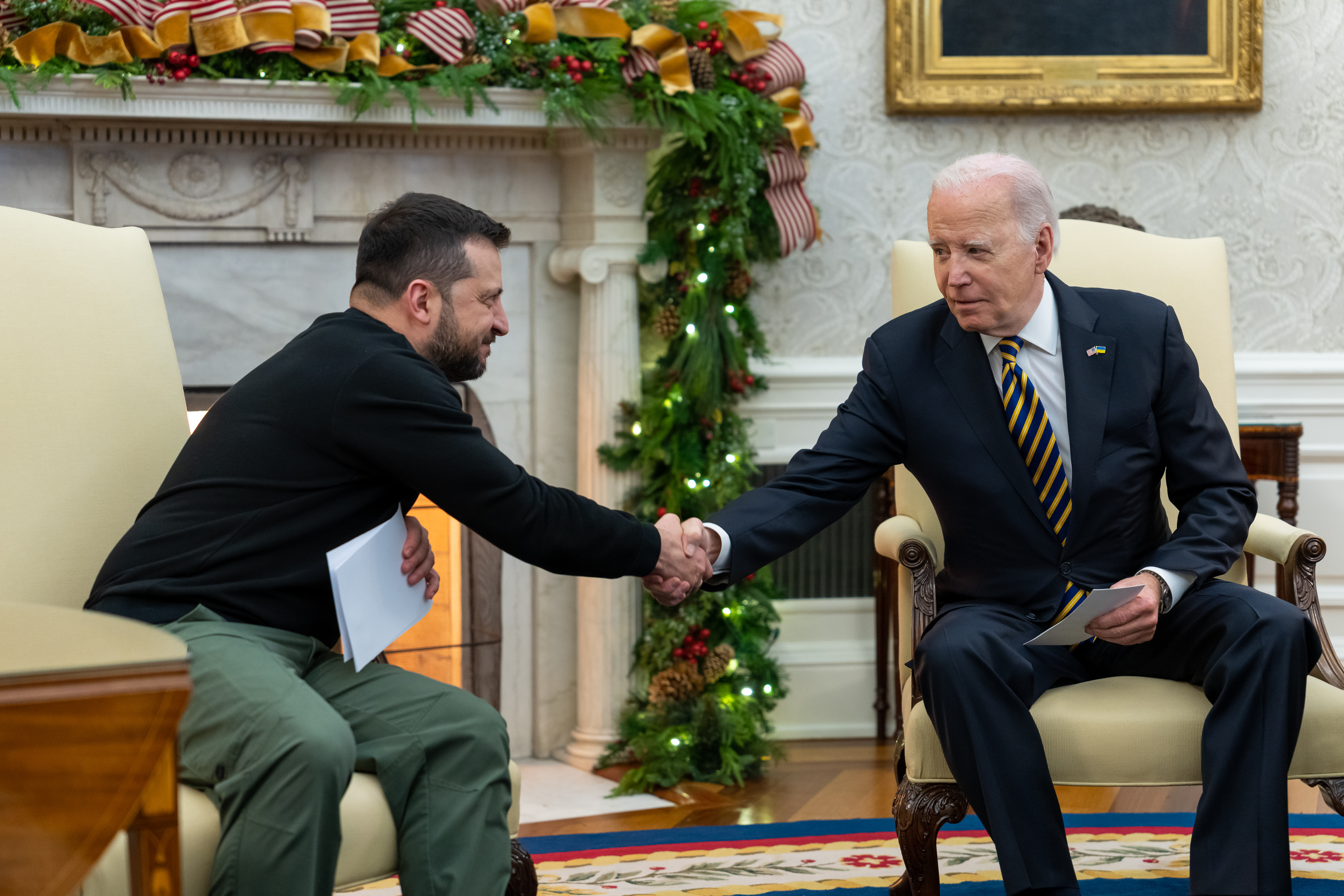

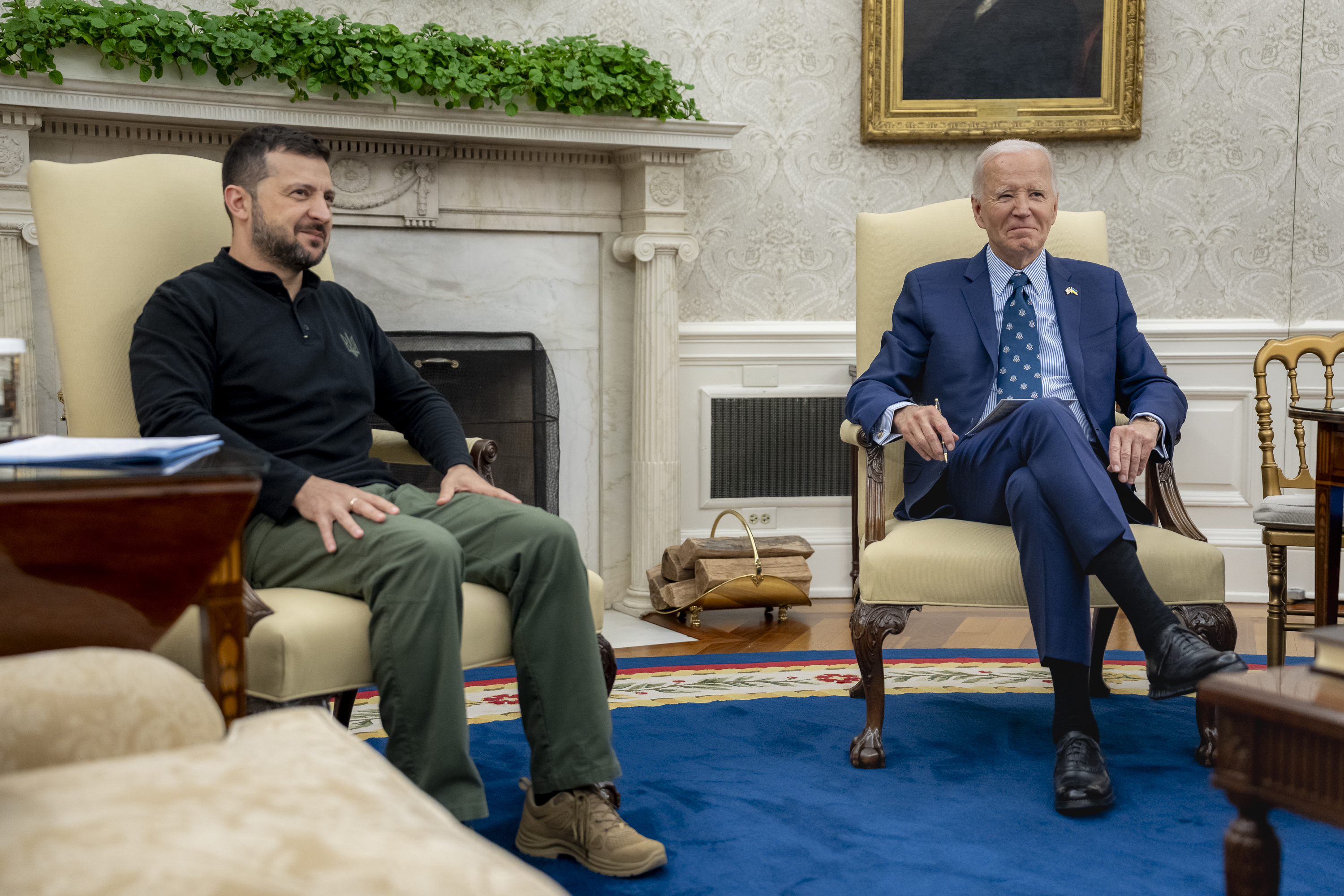

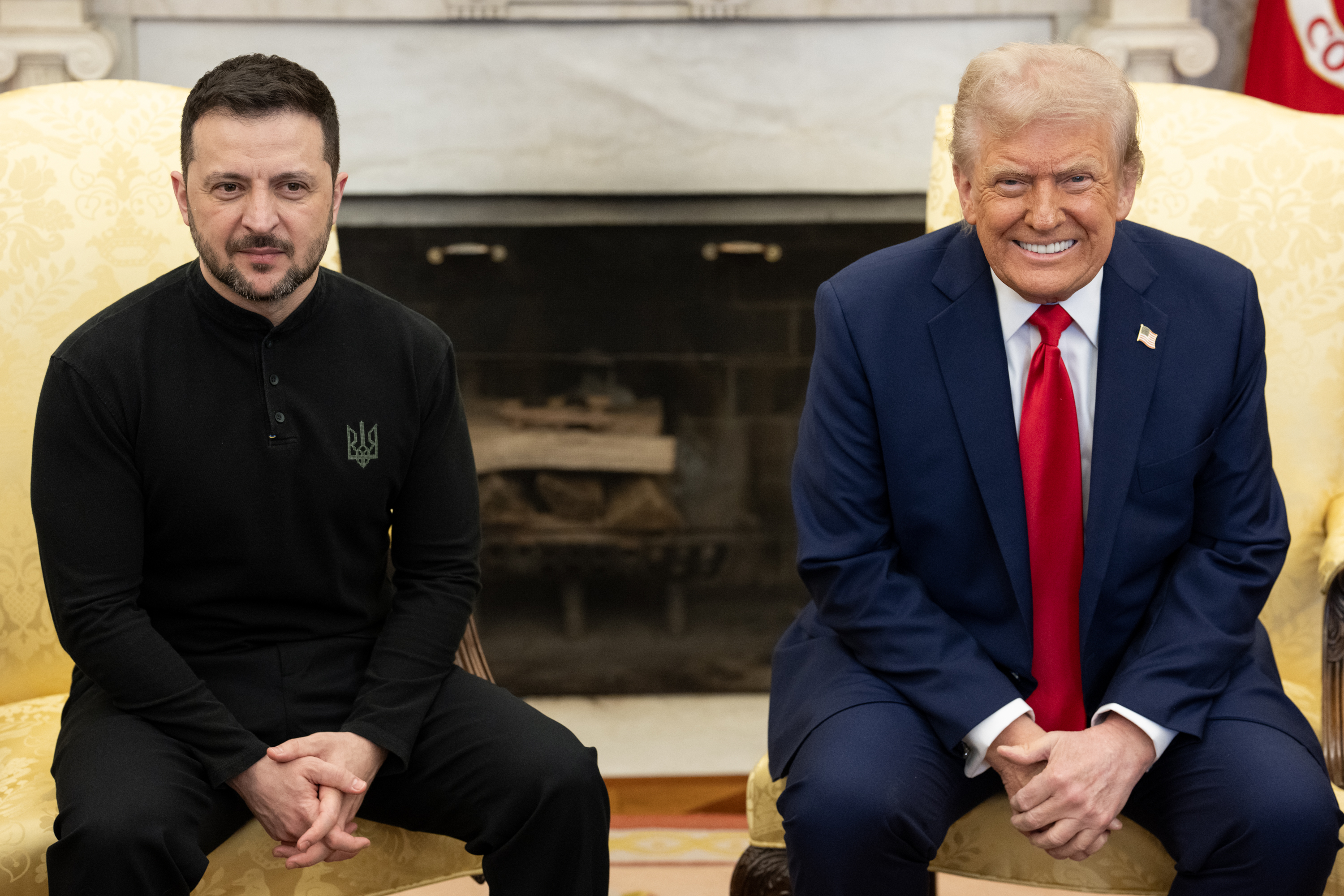

== United Kingdom ==
Table of Trips
| Start | End | Guest | Title | Reason |
|---|---|---|---|---|
| October 4, 1929 | October 10, 1929 | Ramsay MacDonald | Prime Minister | Informal discussions in Washington, D.C. and at Rapidan Camp concerning naval limitations and application of the Paris Peace Pact. Afterwards visited New York City. Departed for Canada October 14. |
| April 21, 1933 | April 26, 1933 | Ramsay MacDonald | Prime Minister | Multilateral economic conversations before the World Monetary and Economic Conference. |
| June 8, 1939 | June 9, 1939 | George VI | King | Official visit. In U.S. June 7–11; visiting New York City and Hyde Park. |
| December 22, 1941 | January 6, 1942 | Winston Churchill | Prime Minister | Attended the First Washington (Arcadia) Conference. |
| June 19, 1942 | June 25, 1942 | Winston Churchill | Prime Minister | Met with President Roosevelt at Hyde Park (June 19–20) and attended the Second Washington Conference (June 21–25). |
| May 11, 1943 | May 26, 1943 | Winston Churchill | Prime Minister | Attended the Trident Conference. |
| August 12, 1943 | August 15, 1943 | Winston Churchill | Prime Minister | Met with President Roosevelt at Hyde Park before the First Quebec Conference. |
| September 1, 1943 | September 12, 1943 | Winston Churchill | Prime Minister | Met with President Roosevelt at Hyde Park and Washington, D.C. |
| September 17, 1944 | September 19, 1944 | Winston Churchill | Prime Minister | Met with President Roosevelt at Hyde Park after the Second Quebec Conference. |
| November 10, 1945 | November 15, 1945 | Clement Attlee | Prime Minister | Informal discussions on international control of atomic energy. |
| December 4, 1950 | December 8, 1950 | Clement Attlee | Prime Minister | Discussed the military situation in Korea and developments in the Far East and Europe with President Truman. |
| January 5, 1952 | January 10, 1952 | Winston Churchill | Prime Minister | Revisited Washington, D.C. January 16–19. Addressed U.S. Congress January 17. |
| January 8, 1953 | January 9, 1953 | Winston Churchill | Prime Minister | Unofficial visit. |
| June 25, 1954 | June 29, 1954 | Winston Churchill | Prime Minister | Informal visit to Washington, D.C. |
| January 30, 1956 | February 3, 1956 | Anthony Eden | Prime Minister | Met with President Eisenhower, addressed U.S. Congress, and issued Joint Declaration on common principles. |
| October 17, 1957 | October 20, 1957 | Elizabeth II | Queen | Attended ceremonies for the 350th anniversary of the first permanent English settlement in North America. In U.S. June 16–21, visited Jamestown and Williamsburg, Washington, D.C., and New York City. |
| October 23, 1957 | October 25, 1957 | Harold Macmillan | Prime Minister | Informal meeting with President Eisenhower. |
| June 7, 1958 | June 11, 1958 | Harold Macmillan | Prime Minister | Unofficial visit. Met informally with the President, also visited Greencastle (received honorary degree from DePauw University), and Baltimore. |
| March 19, 1959 | March 24, 1959 | Harold Macmillan | Prime Minister | Informal discussions with President Eisenhower. |
| June 27, 1959 | June 27, 1959 | Elizabeth II | Queen | Dedicated a monument at the St. Lawrence Power Dam, Massena, New York |
| March 26, 1960 | March 29, 1960 | Harold Macmillan | Prime Minister | At Washington, D.C. and at Camp David to discuss nuclear test negotiations. |
| September 27, 1960 | September 27, 1960 | Harold Macmillan | Prime Minister | Met with President Eisenhower in New York City while attending UN General Assembly session. |
| October 1, 1960 | October 2, 1960 | Harold Macmillan | Prime Minister | Met with President Eisenhower; discussed East-West disarmament talks. |
| March 26, 1961 | March 26, 1961 | Harold Macmillan | Prime Minister | Meeting at Key West; discussed situation in Laos. |
| April 4, 1961 | April 9, 1961 | Harold Macmillan | Prime Minister | Informal visit. Arrived in New York City April 3. |
| April 27, 1962 | April 29, 1962 | Harold Macmillan | Prime Minister | Informal visit. Arrived in U.S. April 25; visiting New York City. |
| November 24, 1963 | November 25, 1963 | Alec Douglas-Home | Prime Minister | Attended funeral of President Kennedy. |
| February 12, 1964 | February 14, 1964 | Alec Douglas-Home | Prime Minister | Official visit. |
| December 6, 1964 | December 9, 1964 | Harold Wilson | Prime Minister | Informal visit. Afterwards visited New York City. |
| December 16, 1965 | December 18, 1965 | Harold Wilson | Prime Minister | Informal visit. In U.S. December 15–19, visiting New York City and Philadelphia |
| July 28, 1966 | July 29, 1966 | Harold Wilson | Prime Minister | Informal visit. |
| June 2, 1967 | June 3, 1967 | Harold Wilson | Prime Minister | Official visit. |
| February 7, 1968 | February 9, 1968 | Harold Wilson | Prime Minister | Informal visit. Afterwards visited New York City. |
| January 26, 1970 | January 28, 1970 | Harold Wilson | Prime Minister | Official visit; attended United States National Security Council meeting at the White House on January 28. |
| October 24, 1970 | October 24, 1970 | Edward Heath | Prime Minister | Attended White House dinner on 25th Anniversary of the U.N |
| December 17, 1970 | December 18, 1970 | Edward Heath | Prime Minister | Official visit. |
| February 1, 1973 | February 2, 1973 | Edward Heath | Prime Minister | Official visit. |
| January 29, 1975 | January 31, 1975 | Harold Wilson | Prime Minister | Official visit. |
| May 7, 1975 | May 7, 1975 | Harold Wilson | Prime Minister | Private visit. |
| May 26, 1976 | May 28, 1976 | James Callaghan | Prime Minister | Attended G-7 Economic Summit Meeting in Dorado, Puerto Rico |
| July 6, 1976 | July 9, 1976 | Elizabeth II | Queen | State visit during Bicentennial celebrations; visited Philadelphia, New York City, Charlottesville, Newport, and Boston. Departed U.S. July 11. |
| March 9, 1977 | March 12, 1977 | James Callaghan | Prime Minister | Official visit. |
| March 23, 1978 | March 23, 1978 | James Callaghan | Prime Minister | Private visit. |
| May 29, 1978 | June 2, 1978 | James Callaghan | Prime Minister | Attended NATO Summit conference. |
| June 26, 1978 | June 26, 1978 | James Callaghan | Prime Minister | Private visit. |
| December 16, 1979 | December 17, 1979 | Margaret Thatcher | Prime Minister | Official visit. Afterwards visited New York City. Departed U.S. December 18. |
| February 25, 1981 | February 28, 1981 | Margaret Thatcher | Prime Minister | Official visit; visited New York City. |
| June 23, 1982 | June 23, 1982 | Margaret Thatcher | Prime Minister | Official working visit. Addressed U.N. Special on Disarmament June 23. |
| February 26, 1983 | March 7, 1983 | Elizabeth II | Queen | Official visit to San Diego, Palm Springs, Los Angeles, Santa Barbara, San Francisco, Yosemite National Park, and Seattle. |
| May 28, 1983 | May 31, 1983 | Margaret Thatcher | Prime Minister | Attended G-7 Economic Summit meeting, Williamsburg |
| September 28, 1983 | September 30, 1983 | Margaret Thatcher | Prime Minister | Official working visit. |
| December 22, 1984 | December 22, 1984 | Margaret Thatcher | Prime Minister | Private visit at Camp David. |
| February 19, 1985 | February 21, 1985 | Margaret Thatcher | Prime Minister | Official Working Visit. Addressed Joint Session of U.S. Congress February 20. |
| October 23, 1985 | October 23, 1985 | Margaret Thatcher | Prime Minister | Met with President Reagan in New York City, at reception and luncheon at the U.N. |
| November 14, 1986 | November 15, 1986 | Margaret Thatcher | Prime Minister | Private Visit. |
| July 16, 1987 | July 17, 1987 | Margaret Thatcher | Prime Minister | Official Working Visit. |
| November 15, 1988 | November 17, 1988 | Margaret Thatcher | Prime Minister | Official Visit. |
| November 24, 1989 | November 24, 1989 | Margaret Thatcher | Prime Minister | Private visit. |
| July 8, 1990 | July 11, 1990 | Margaret Thatcher | Prime Minister | Attended G-7 Economic Summit meeting in Houston. |
| April 2, 1990 | April 2, 1990 | Margaret Thatcher | Prime Minister | Informal meeting in Aspen, Colorado. |
| August 6, 1990 | August 6, 1990 | Margaret Thatcher | Prime Minister | Discussed the Kuwait crisis with President Bush and NATO Secretary General Manfred Wörner. |
| September 30, 1990 | September 30, 1990 | Margaret Thatcher | Prime Minister | Met with President Bush at the U.N. General Assembly. |
| December 22, 1990 | December 22, 1990 | John Major | Prime Minister | Met with President Bush during a private visit at Camp David |
| May 14, 1991 | May 17, 1991 | Elizabeth II | Queen | State visit. Addressed Joint Meeting of Congress May 16. Later visited Miami, Tampa, Austin, San Antonio, Houston, and Lexington |
| August 28, 1991 | August 29, 1991 | John Major | Prime Minister | Informal meeting with President Bush at Kennebunkport |
| January 30, 1992 | January 30, 1992 | John Major | Prime Minister | Met with President Bush while attending a U.N. Security Council Summit in New York City. |
| June 6, 1992 | June 8, 1992 | John Major | Prime Minister | Met with President Bush during a private visit to Washington, D.C. and Camp David |
| December 18, 1992 | December 20, 1992 | John Major | Prime Minister | Official working visit; private visit to Camp David. December 19–20. Was accompanied by EC President Jacques Delors. |
| February 23, 1993 | February 25, 1993 | John Major | Prime Minister | Met with President Clinton during a private visit. |
| February 27, 1994 | March 1, 1994 | John Major | Prime Minister | Official working visit to Pittsburgh, and Washington, D.C. |
| April 2, 1995 | April 4, 1995 | John Major | Prime Minister | Official working visit. |
| June 20, 1997 | June 22, 1997 | Tony Blair | Prime Minister | Attended the G-8 Economic Summit meeting in Denver |
| February 4, 1998 | February 7, 1998 | Tony Blair | Prime Minister | Official visit. |
| September 22, 1998 | September 22, 1998 | Tony Blair | Prime Minister | Attended a forum on "Strengthening Democracy in the Global Economy" at New York University. |
| April 23, 1999 | April 25, 1999 | Tony Blair | Prime Minister | Attended NATO's 50th Anniversary Summit. Arrived April 21. |
| September 7, 2000 | September 7, 2000 | Tony Blair | Prime Minister | Met with President Clinton at the UN Millennium Summit in New York City. |
| February 22, 2001 | February 24, 2001 | Tony Blair | Prime Minister | Working visit. |
| September 20, 2001 | September 20, 2001 | Tony Blair | Prime Minister | Working visit. |
| November 7, 2001 | November 7, 2001 | Tony Blair | Prime Minister | Working visit. |
| April 4, 2002 | April 5, 2002 | Tony Blair | Prime Minister | Private visit. Met with President Bush at Crawford Ranch |
| September 7, 2002 | September 7, 2002 | Tony Blair | Prime Minister | Discussed the Iraq crisis with President Bush at Camp David |
| January 31, 2003 | January 31, 2003 | Tony Blair | Prime Minister | Working visit at Camp David |
| March 26, 2003 | March 27, 2003 | Tony Blair | Prime Minister | Official select visit. Discussed the war with Iraq at Camp David. Also met with UN Secretary-General Kofi Annan in New York City, March 27. |
| July 17, 2003 | July 17, 2003 | Tony Blair | Prime Minister | Working visit; addressed a Joint Session of Congress |
| April 16, 2004 | April 16, 2004 | Tony Blair | Prime Minister | Working visit |
| June 8, 2004 | June 11, 2004 | Tony Blair | Prime Minister | Attended G-8 Economic Summit at Sea Island. Attended the funeral of Former President Reagan. |
| November 12, 2004 | November 13, 2004 | Tony Blair | Prime Minister | Working visit. |
| June 7, 2005 | June 7, 2005 | Tony Blair | Prime Minister | Working visit. Discussed financial assistance and debt relief for Africa. |
| September 14, 2005 | September 14, 2005 | Tony Blair | Prime Minister | Met with President Bush at the UN General Assembly in New York City. |
| May 25, 2006 | May 26, 2006 | Tony Blair | Prime Minister | Working visit. |
| July 28, 2006 | July 28, 2006 | Tony Blair | Prime Minister | Working visit. |
| December 6, 2006 | December 7, 2006 | Tony Blair | Prime Minister | Working visit. |
| May 7, 2007 | May 8, 2007 | Elizabeth II | Queen | State visit. Arrived in Richmond May 3. Addressed Virginia General Assembly, commemorated the 400th anniversary of the Jamestown Settlement, visiting Jamestown and Williamsburg. Attended the Kentucky Derby in Louisville May 7. Also visited the Goddard Space Flight Center in Greenbelt, Maryland |
| May 16, 2007 | May 17, 2007 | Tony Blair | Prime Minister | Working visit. |
| July 29, 2007 | July 30, 2007 | Gordon Brown | Prime Minister | Working visit. Met with President Bush at Camp David |
| April 16, 2008 | April 18, 2008 | Gordon Brown | Prime Minister | Working visit. |
| September 26, 2008 | September 26, 2008 | Gordon Brown | Prime Minister | Working visit. |
| November 14, 2008 | November 15, 2008 | Gordon Brown | Prime Minister | Attended the G-20 Economic Summit meeting. |
| March 3, 2009 | March 3, 2009 | Gordon Brown | Prime Minister | Working Visit. Also addressed a joint session of Congress. |
| September 24, 2009 | September 25, 2009 | Gordon Brown | Prime Minister | Attended a meeting of the Friends of Democratic Pakistan summit in New York City. |
| September 24, 2009 | September 25, 2009 | Gordon Brown | Prime Minister | Attended the G-20 Economic Summit in Pittsburgh. |
| July 20, 2010 | July 20, 2010 | David Cameron | Prime Minister | Working visit. |
| September 21, 2011 | September 21, 2011 | David Cameron | Prime Minister | Met with President Obama at the UN General Assembly in New York City. |
| March 13, 2012 | March 14, 2012 | David Cameron | Prime Minister | Working visit. Also visited Dayton. |
| May 18, 2012 | May 19, 2012 | David Cameron | Prime Minister | Attended the G-8 Economic Summit at Camp David. |
| May 20, 2012 | May 21, 2012 | David Cameron | Prime Minister | Attended the NATO Summit meeting in Chicago. |
| May 12, 2013 | May 13, 2013 | David Cameron | Prime Minister | Working visit. |
| January 15, 2015 | January 16, 2015 | David Cameron | Prime Minister | Official working visit. |
| March 31, 2016 | April 1, 2016 | David Cameron | Prime Minister | Attended the Nuclear Security Summit. |
| January 27, 2017 | January 27, 2017 | Theresa May | Prime Minister | Official working visit. |
| September 24, 2019 | September 24, 2019 | Boris Johnson | Prime Minister | Met with President Trump at the UN General Assembly Meeting in New York City. |
| September 21, 2021 | September 21, 2021 | Boris Johnson | Prime Minister | Official working visit. |
| September 21, 2022 | September 21, 2022 | Liz Truss | Prime Minister | Met with President Biden at the UN General Assembly Meeting in New York City. |
| March 13, 2023 | March 13, 2023 | Rishi Sunak | Prime Minister | Attended AUKUS Summit at Point Loma, California. |
| June 6, 2023 | June 9, 2023 | Rishi Sunak | Prime Minister | Official working visit. |
| July 10, 2024 | July 10, 2024 | Keir Starmer | Prime Minister | Working visit. |
| July 10, 2024 | July 11, 2024 | Keir Starmer | Prime Minister | Attended NATO 75th Anniversary Summit in Washington, D.C. |
| September 13, 2024 | September 13, 2024 | Keir Starmer | Prime Minister | Working visit. |
| February 27, 2025 | February 27, 2025 | Keir Starmer | Prime Minister | Official working visit. |
| April 27, 2026 | April 30, 2026 | Charles III | King | State visit. Addressed Joint Meeting of Congress. |
| September 22, 2026 | September 22, 2026 | Andy Burnham | Prime Minister | Met with President Trump at the UN General Assembly Meeting in New York City. |

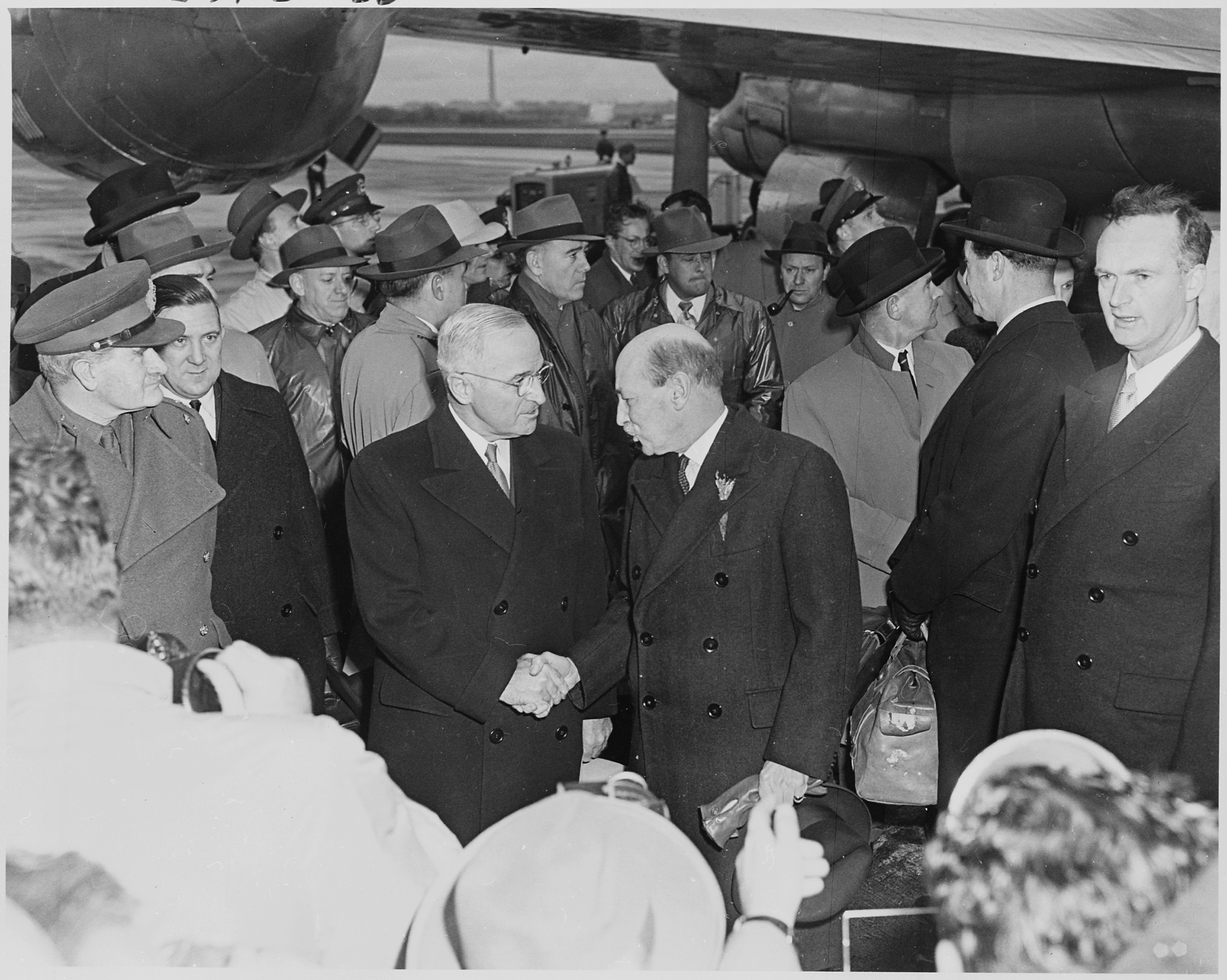

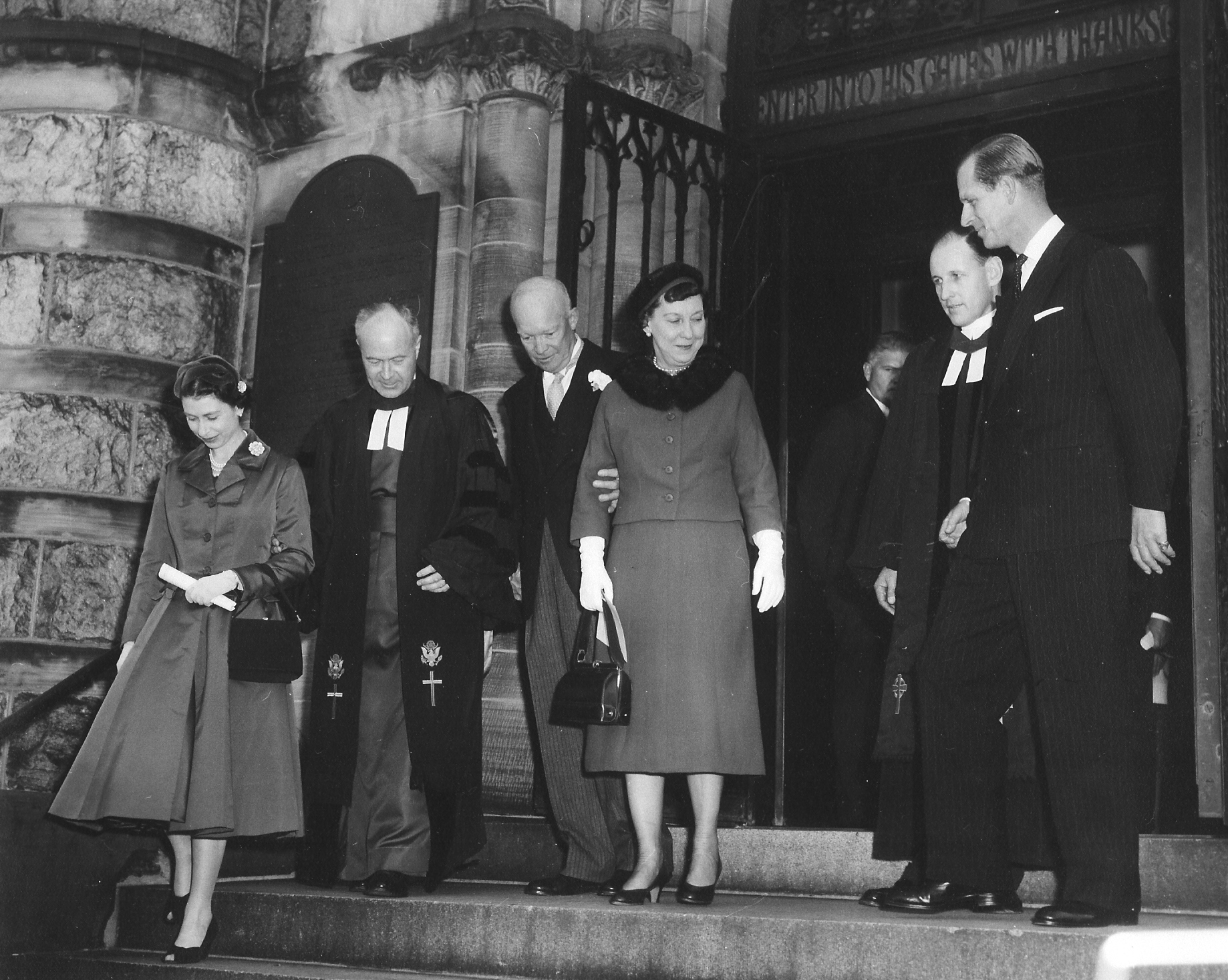

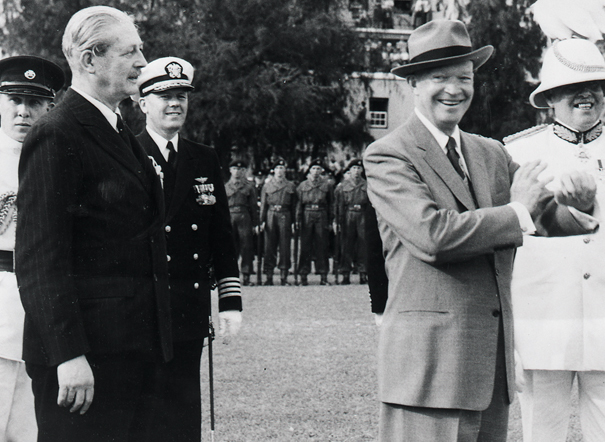

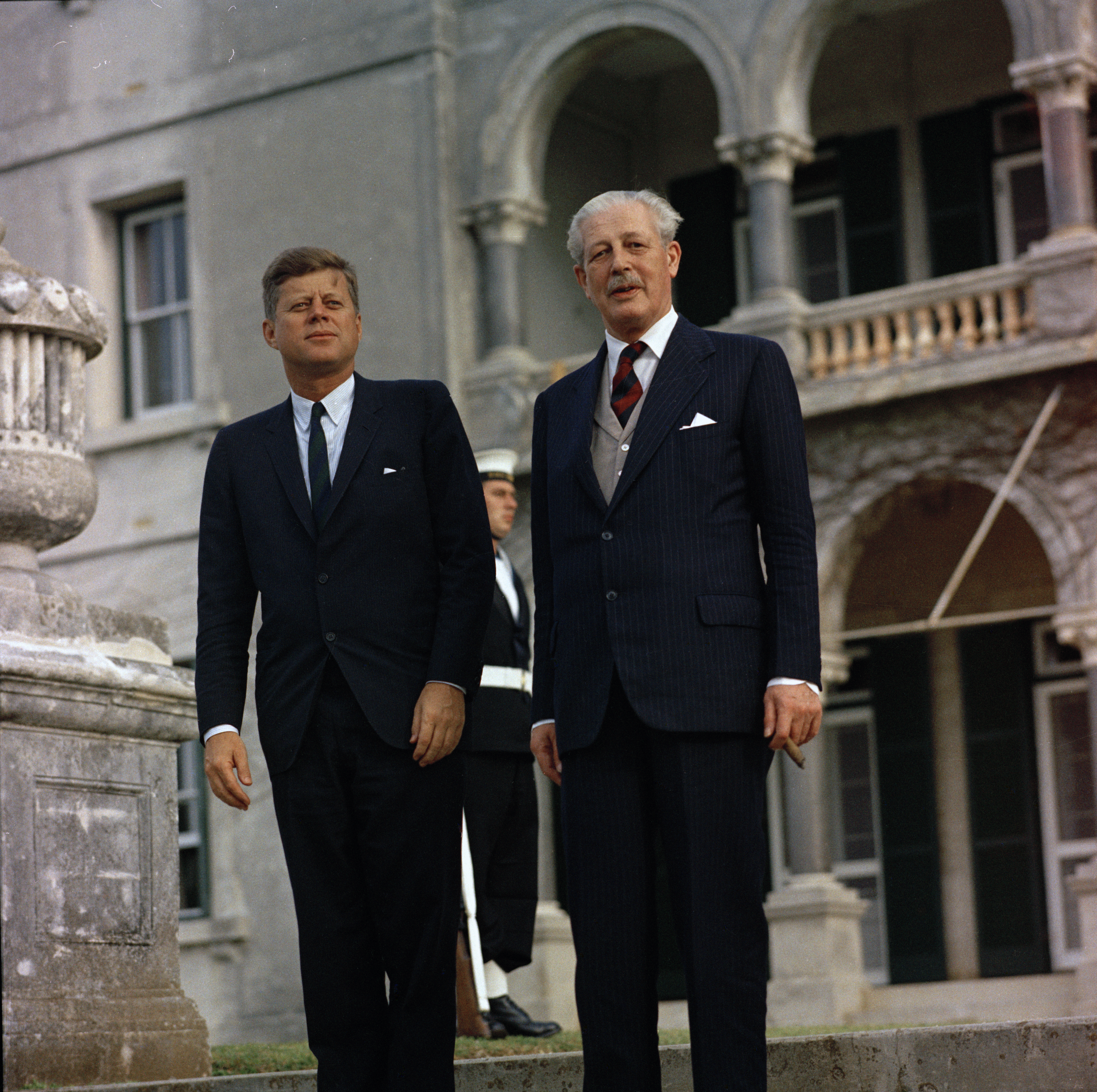

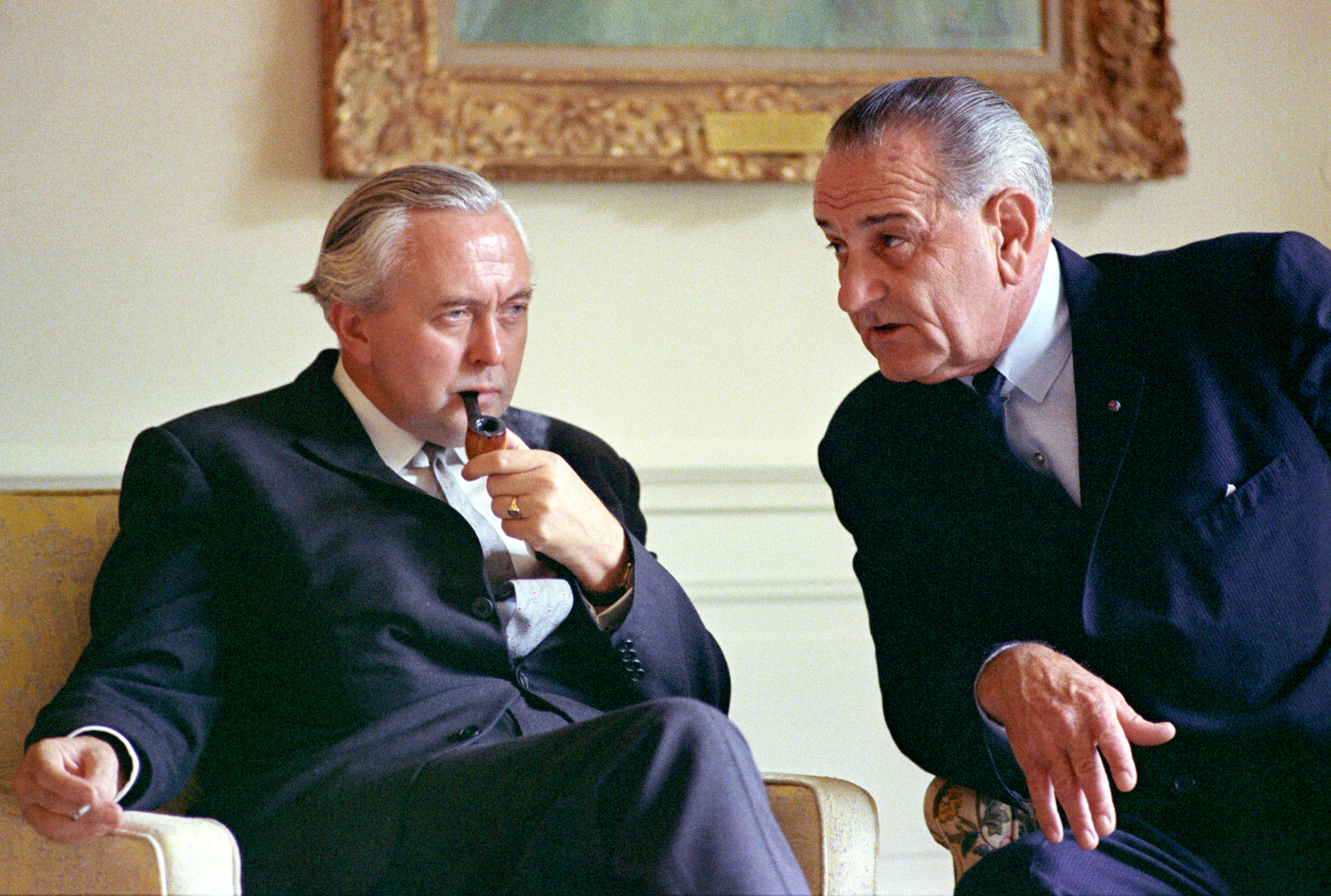

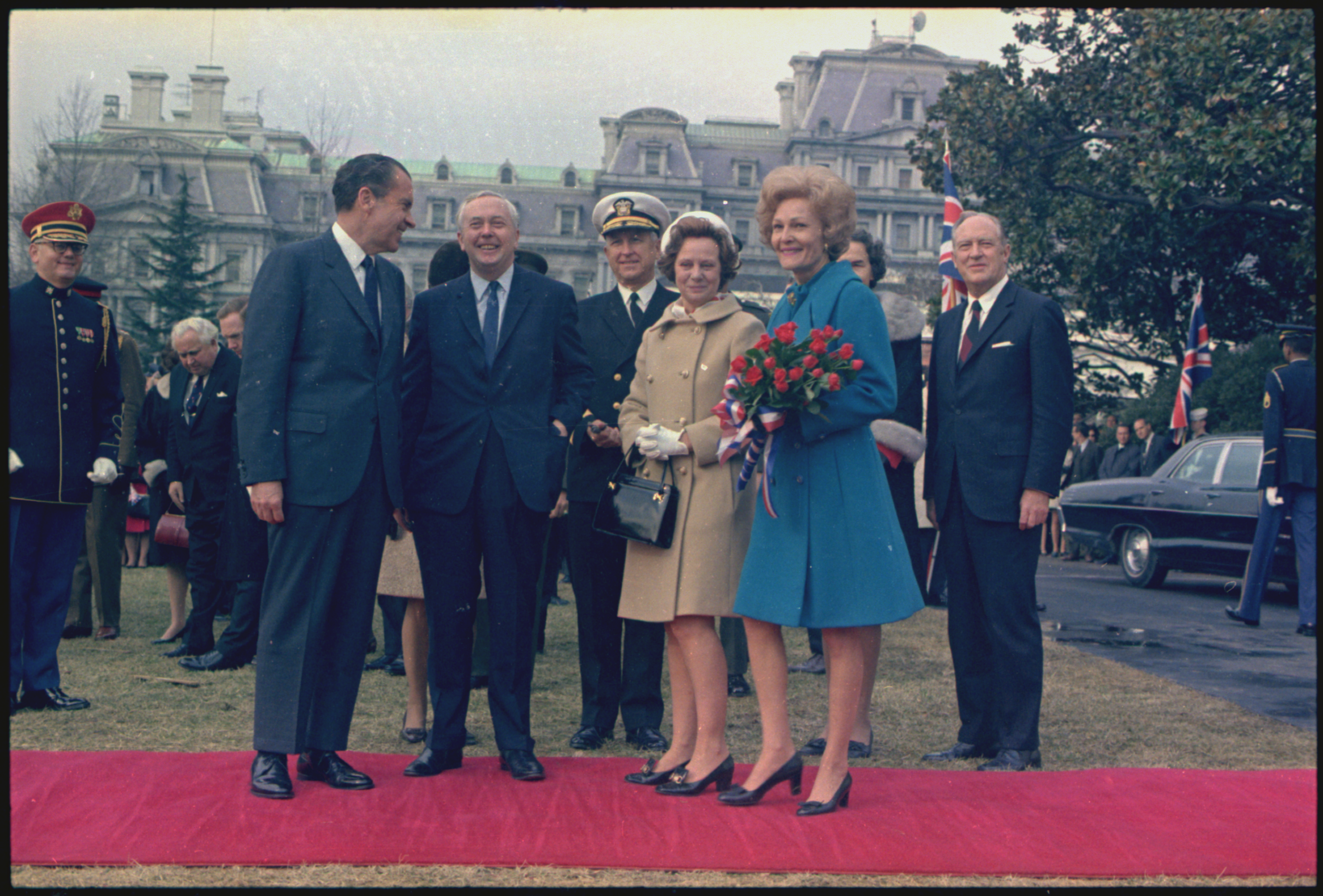

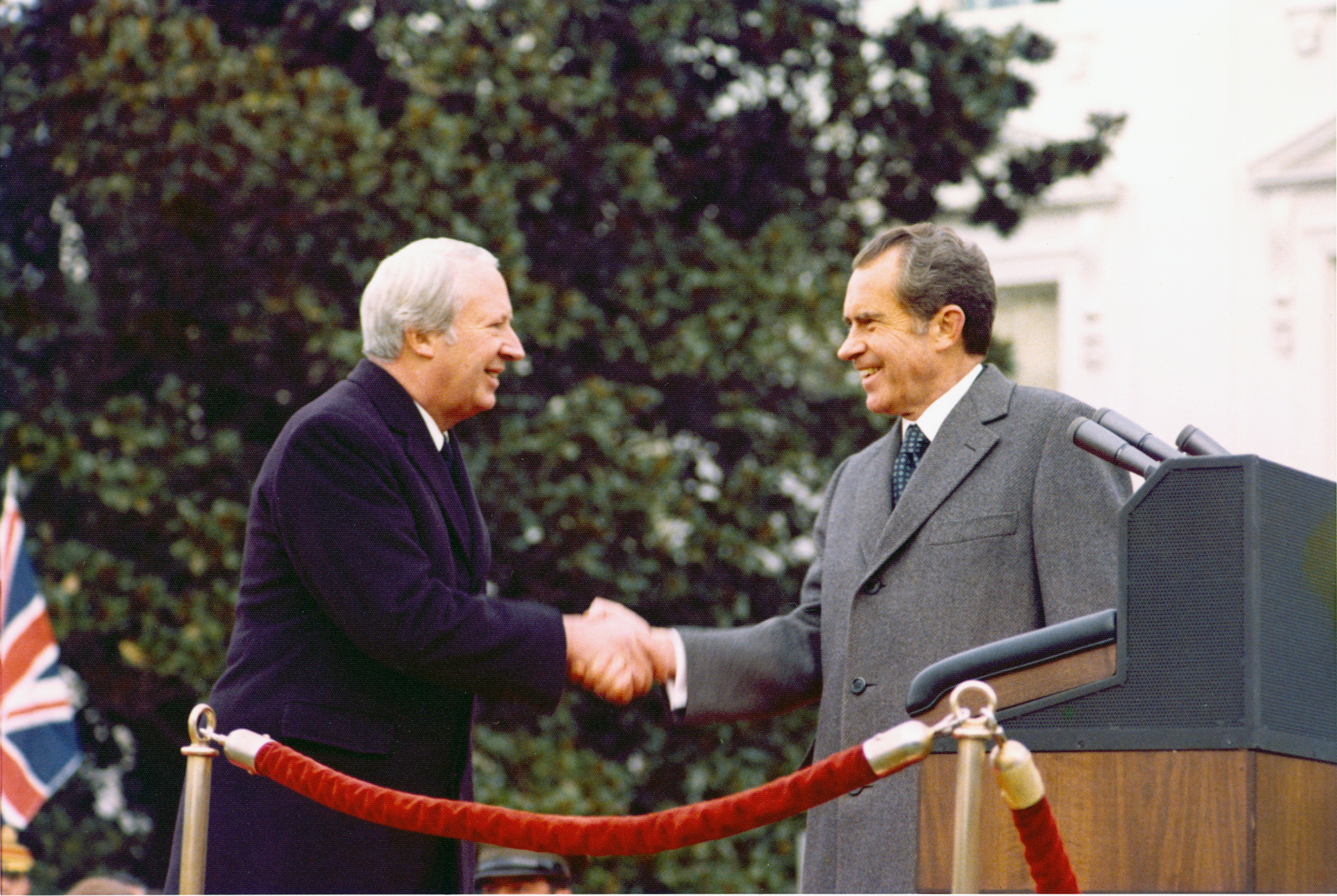

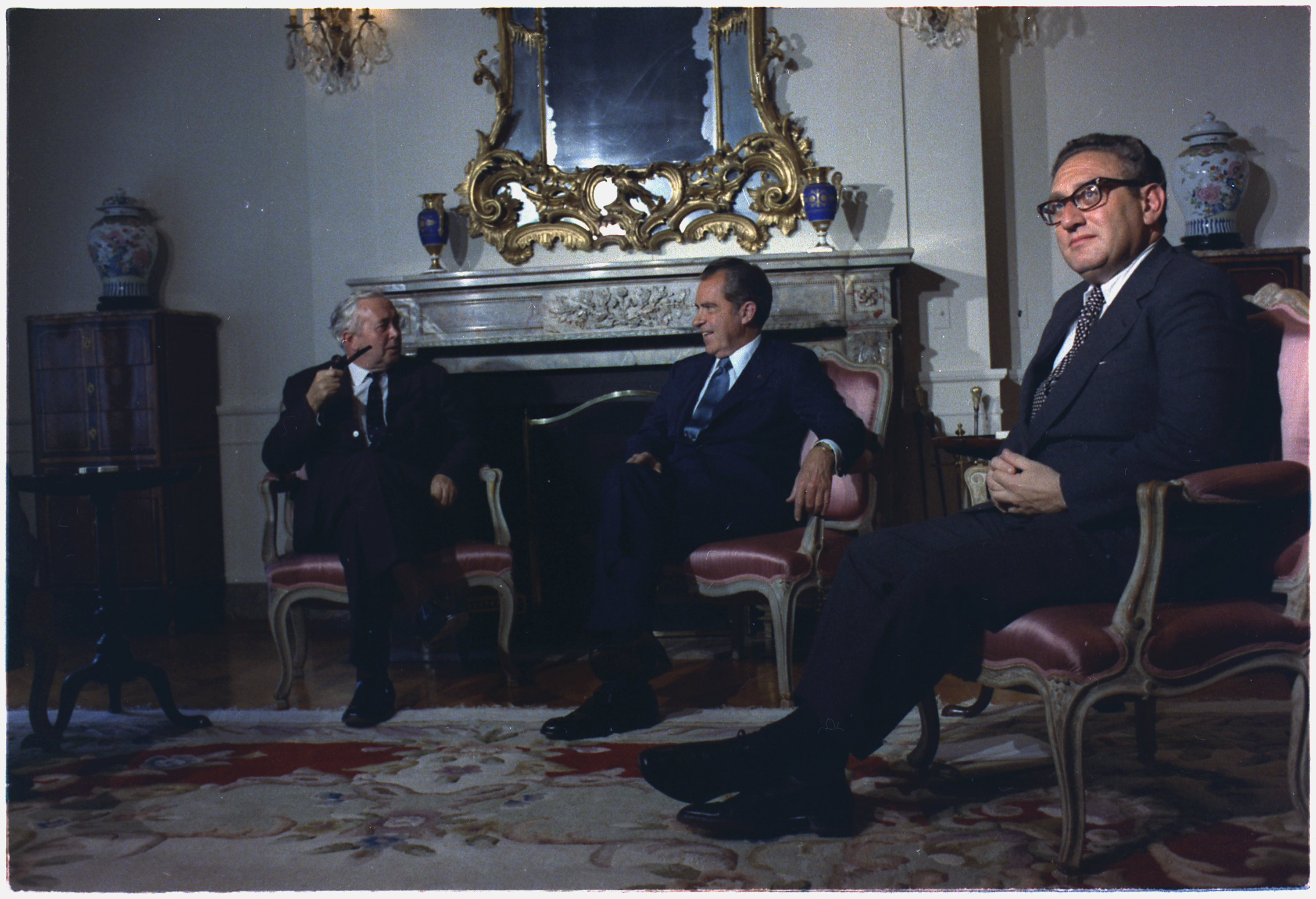

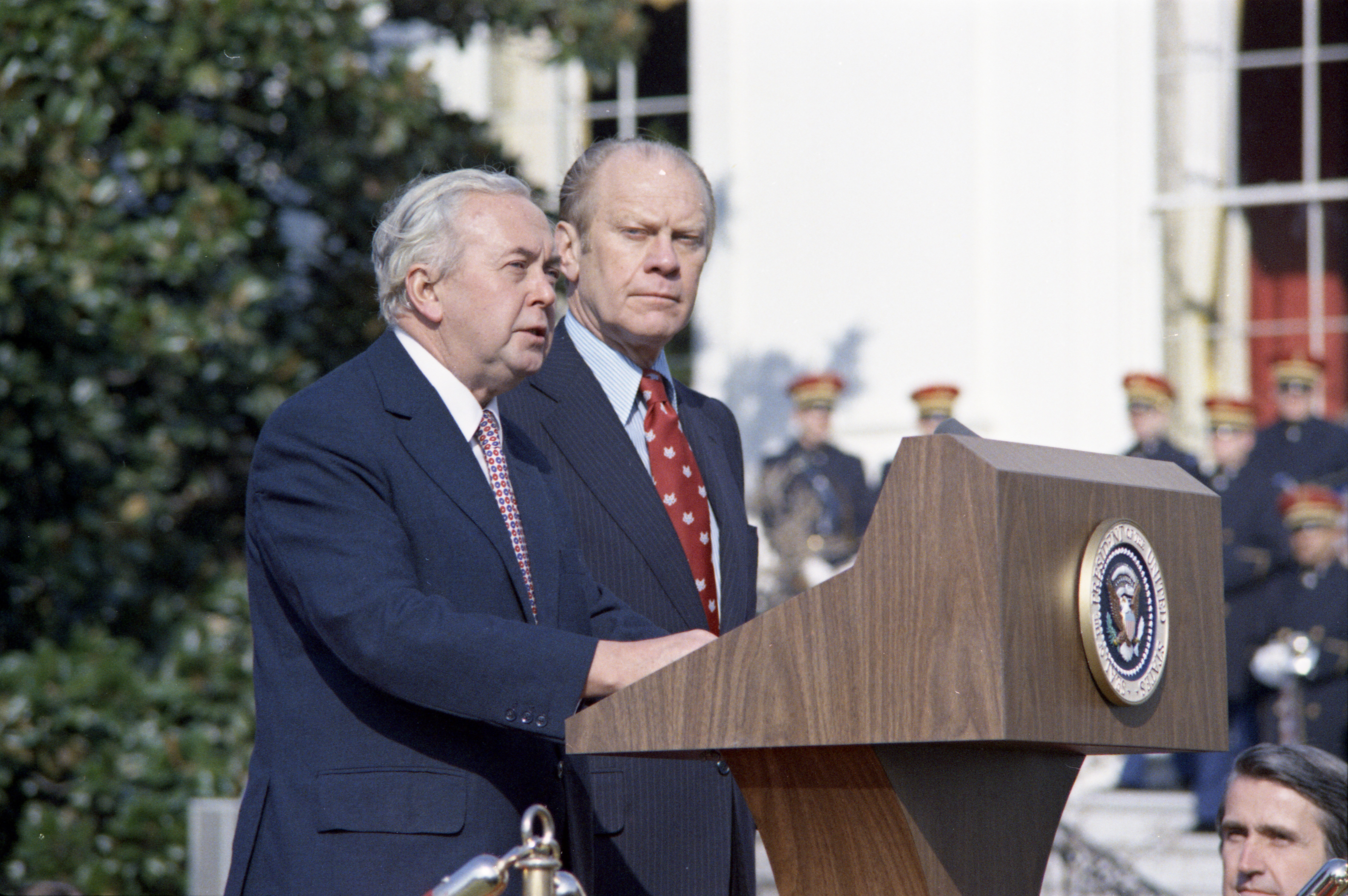

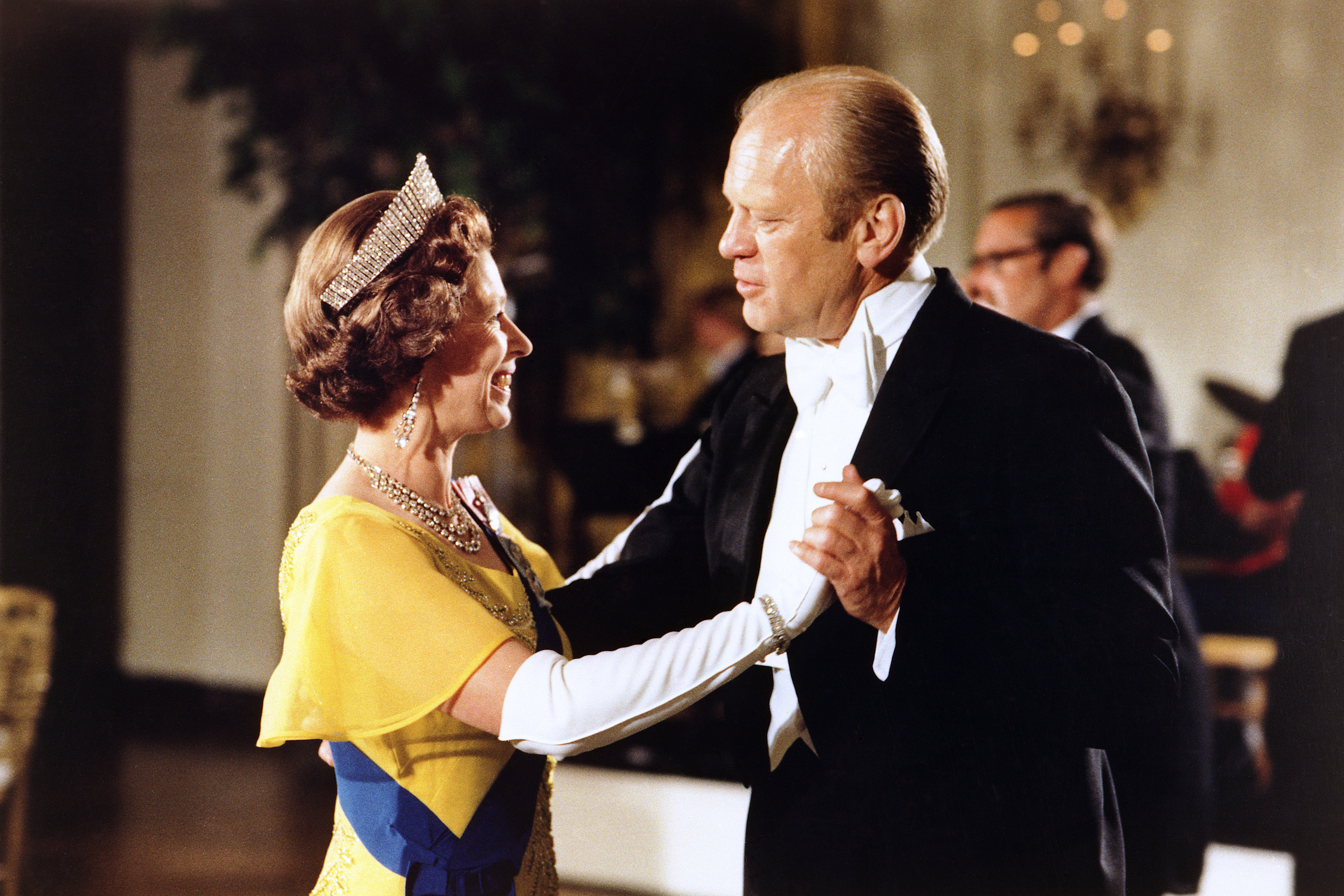

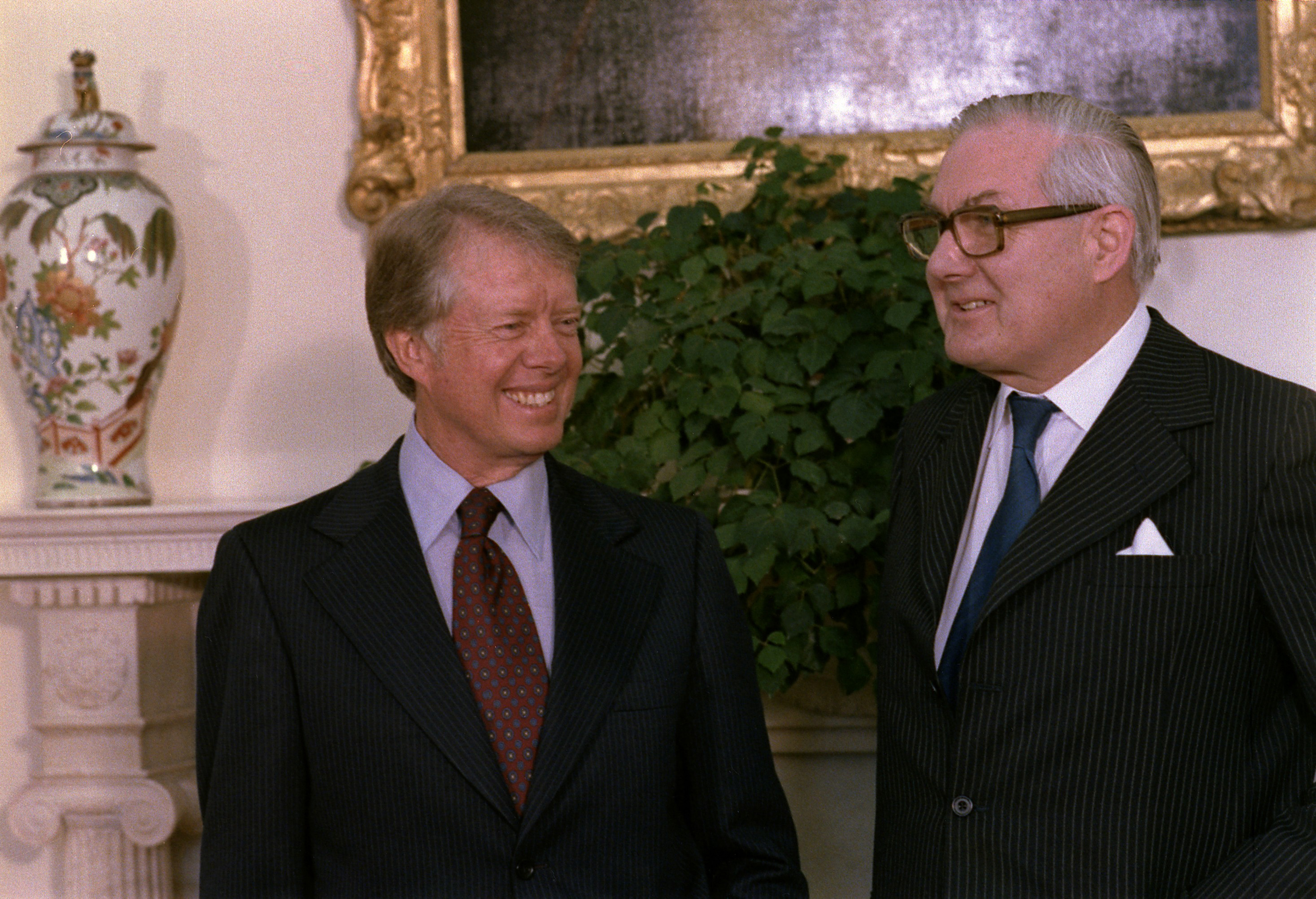

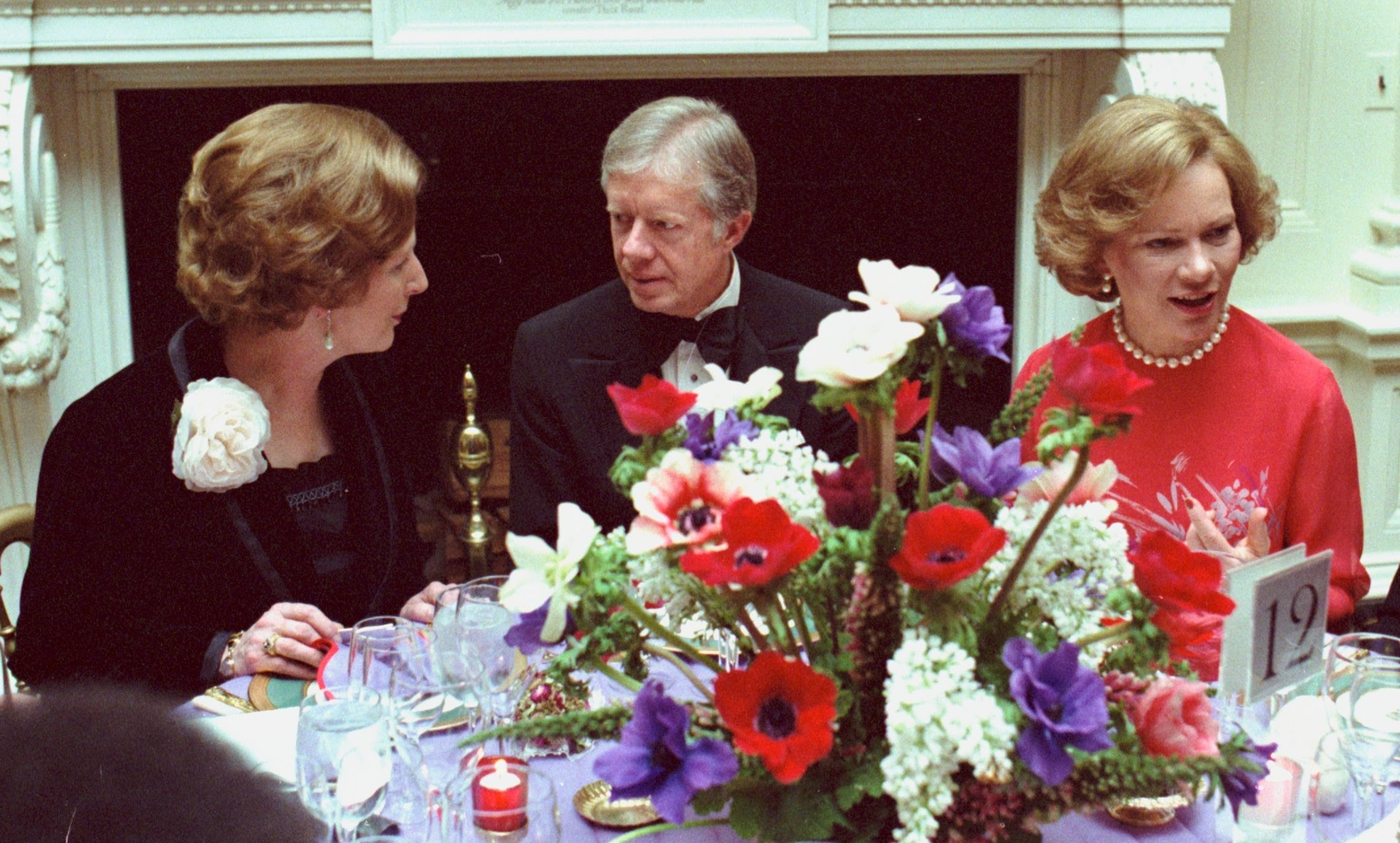

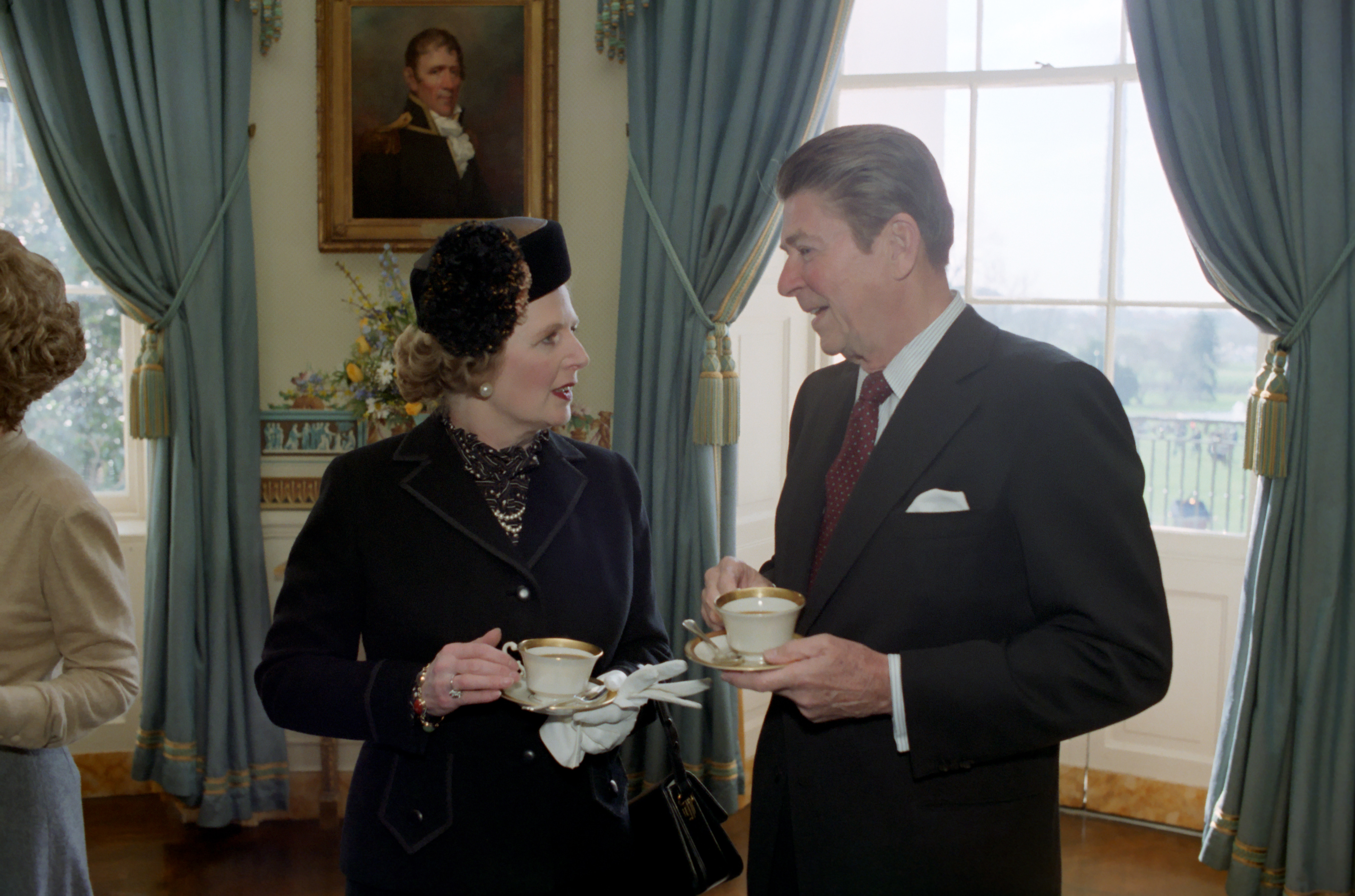

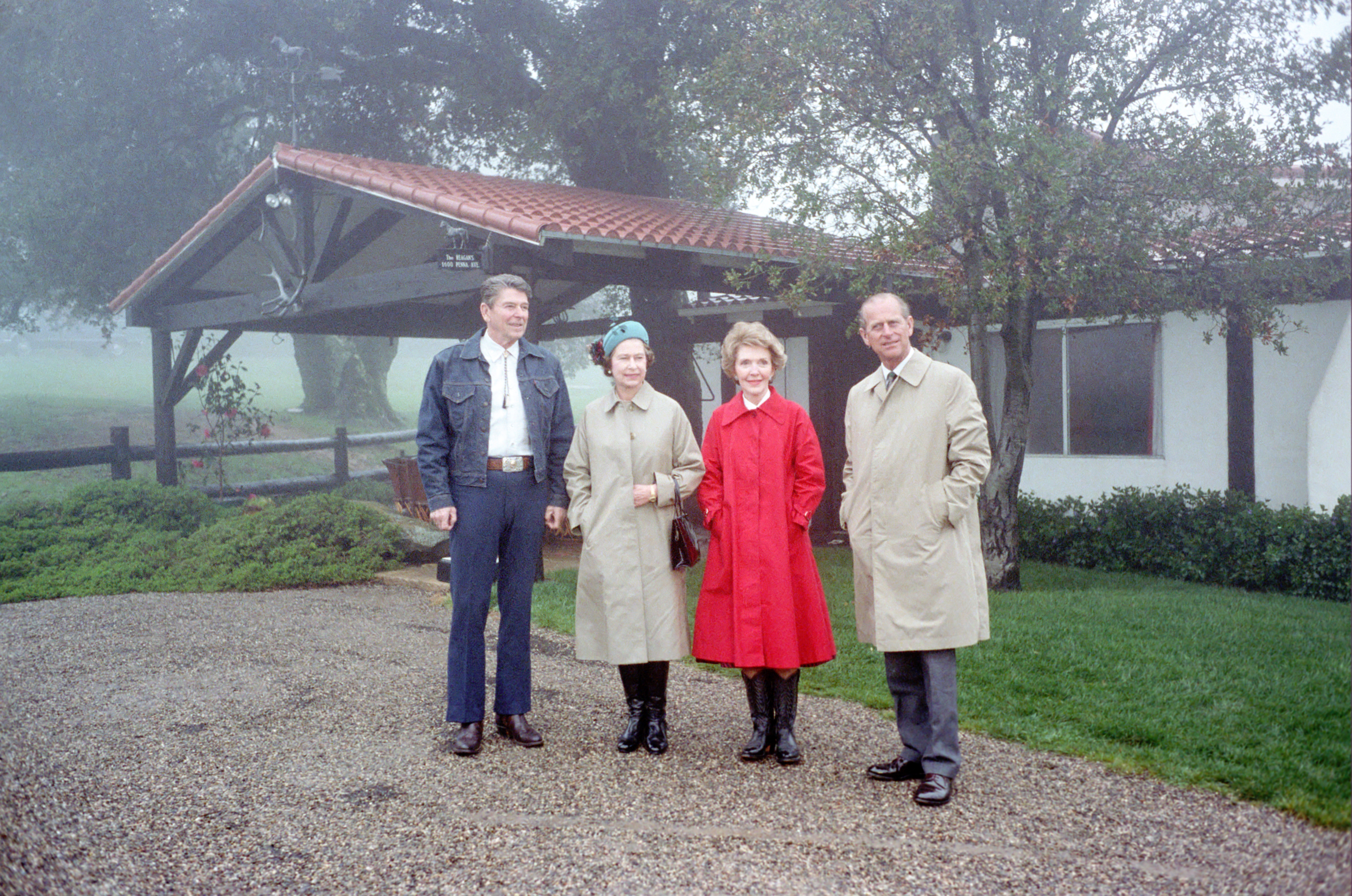

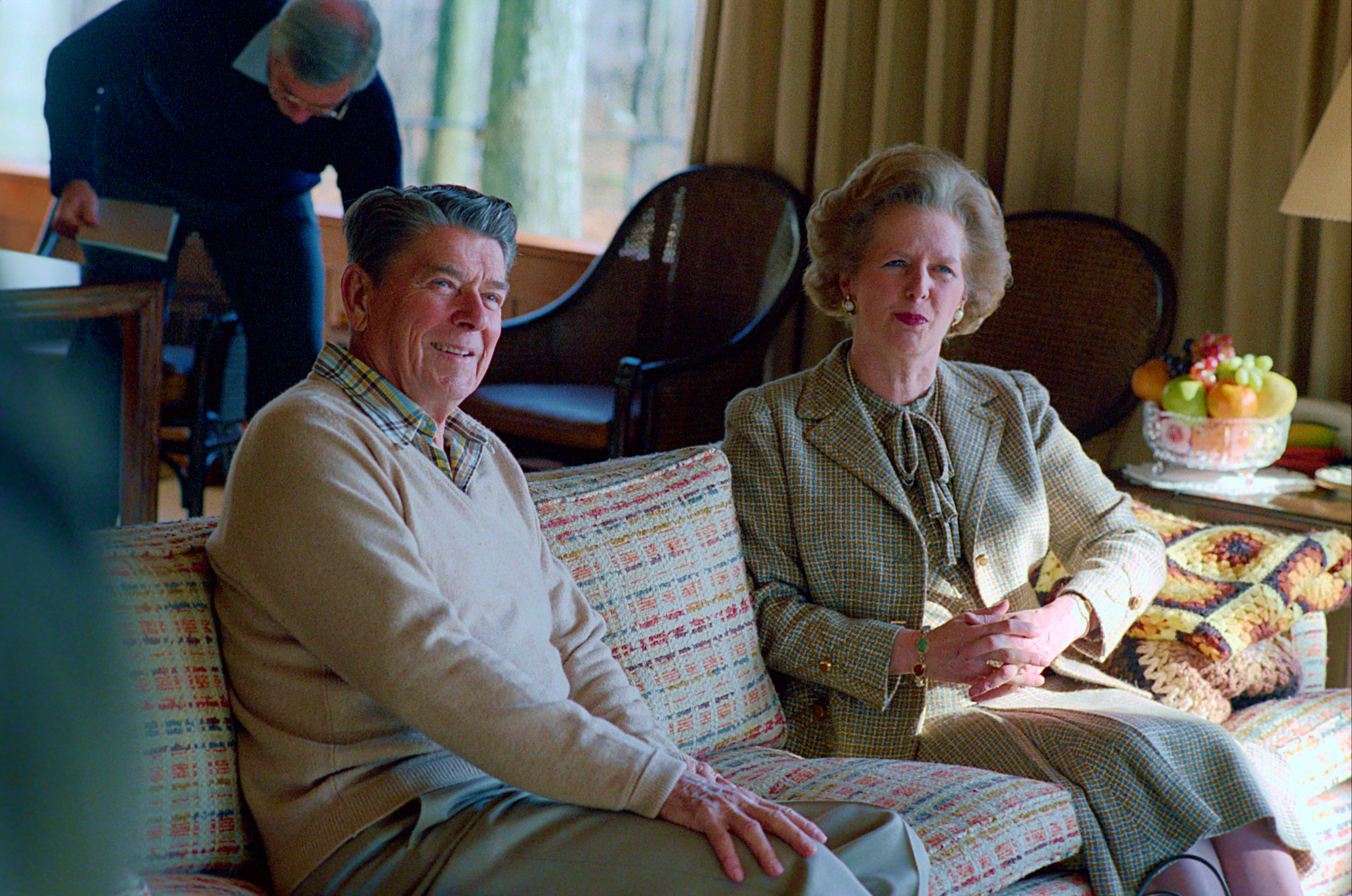

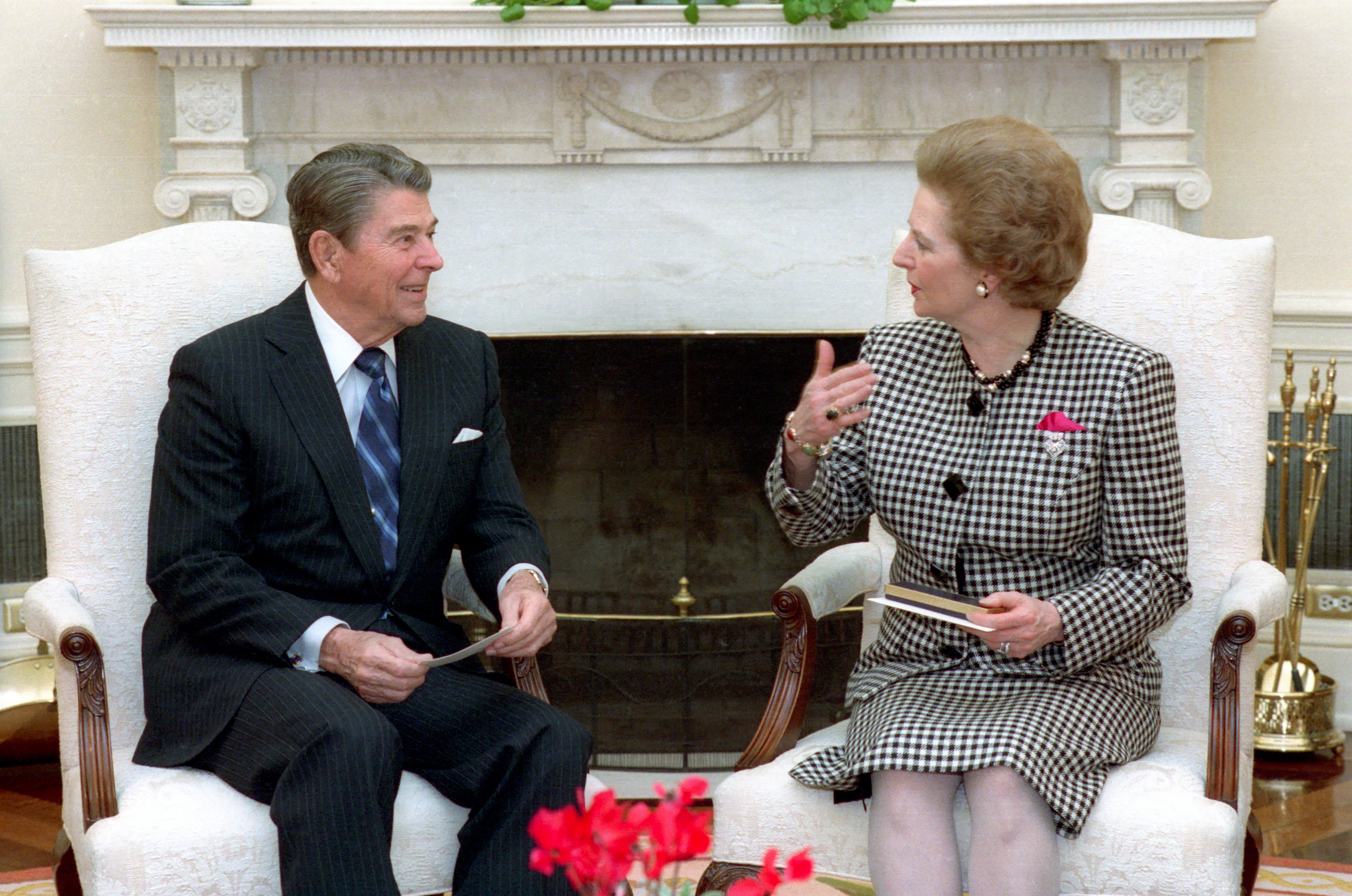

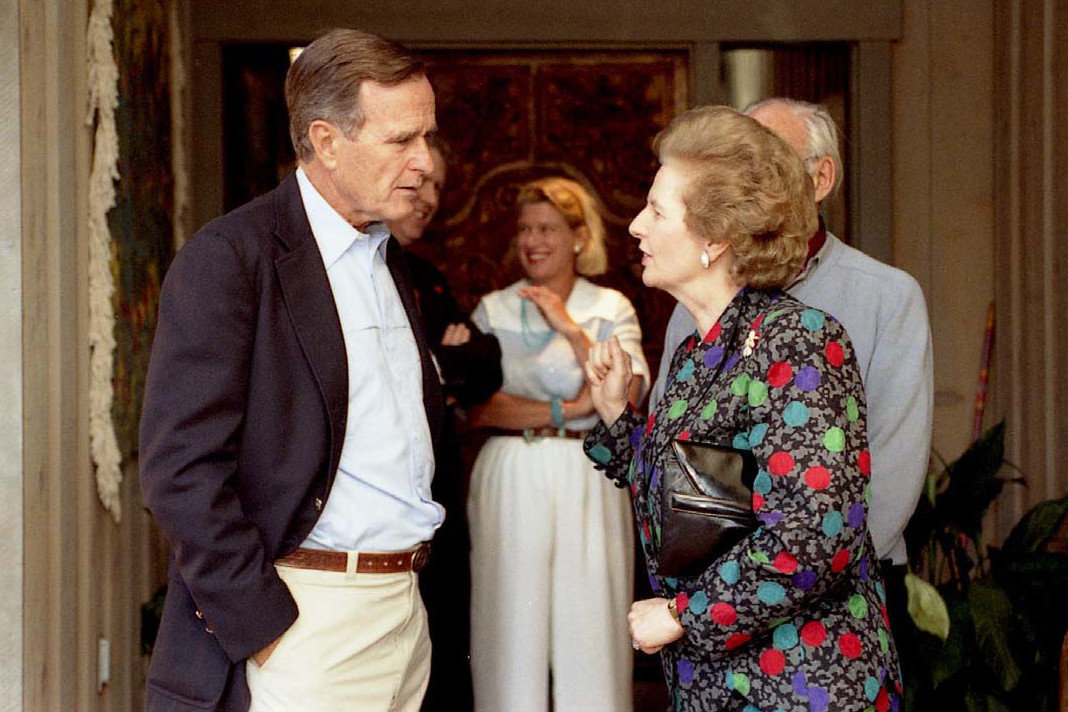

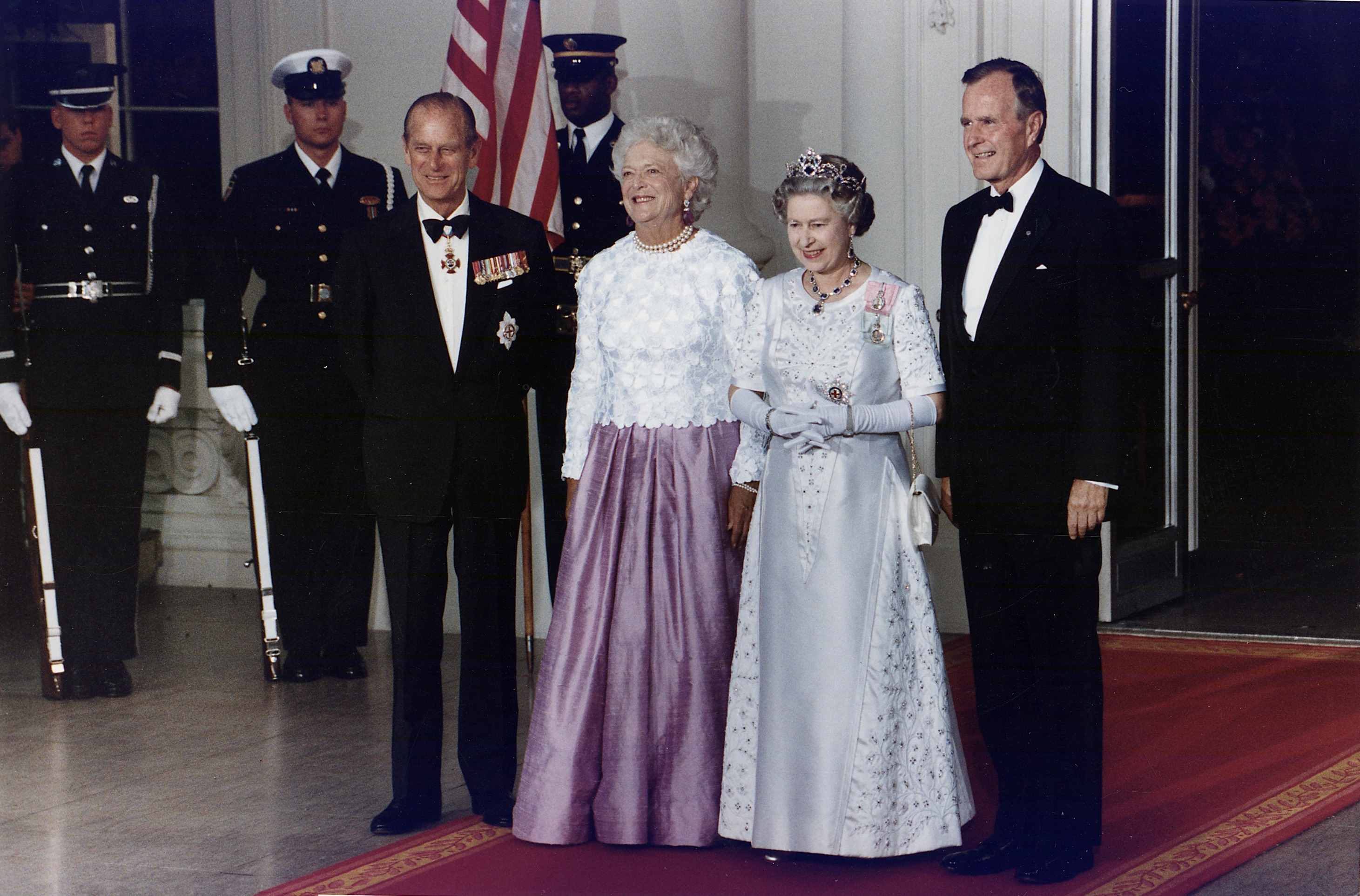

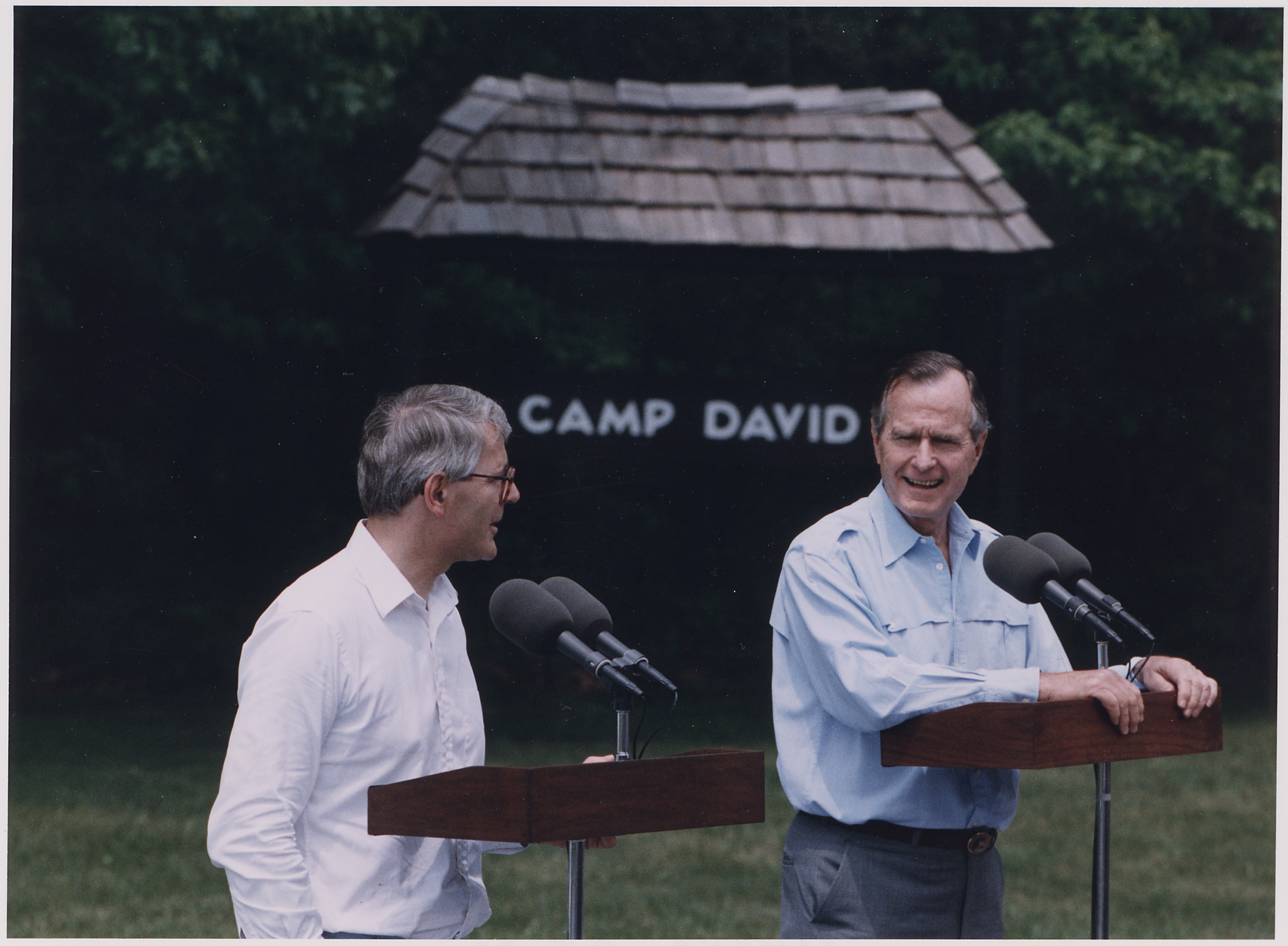

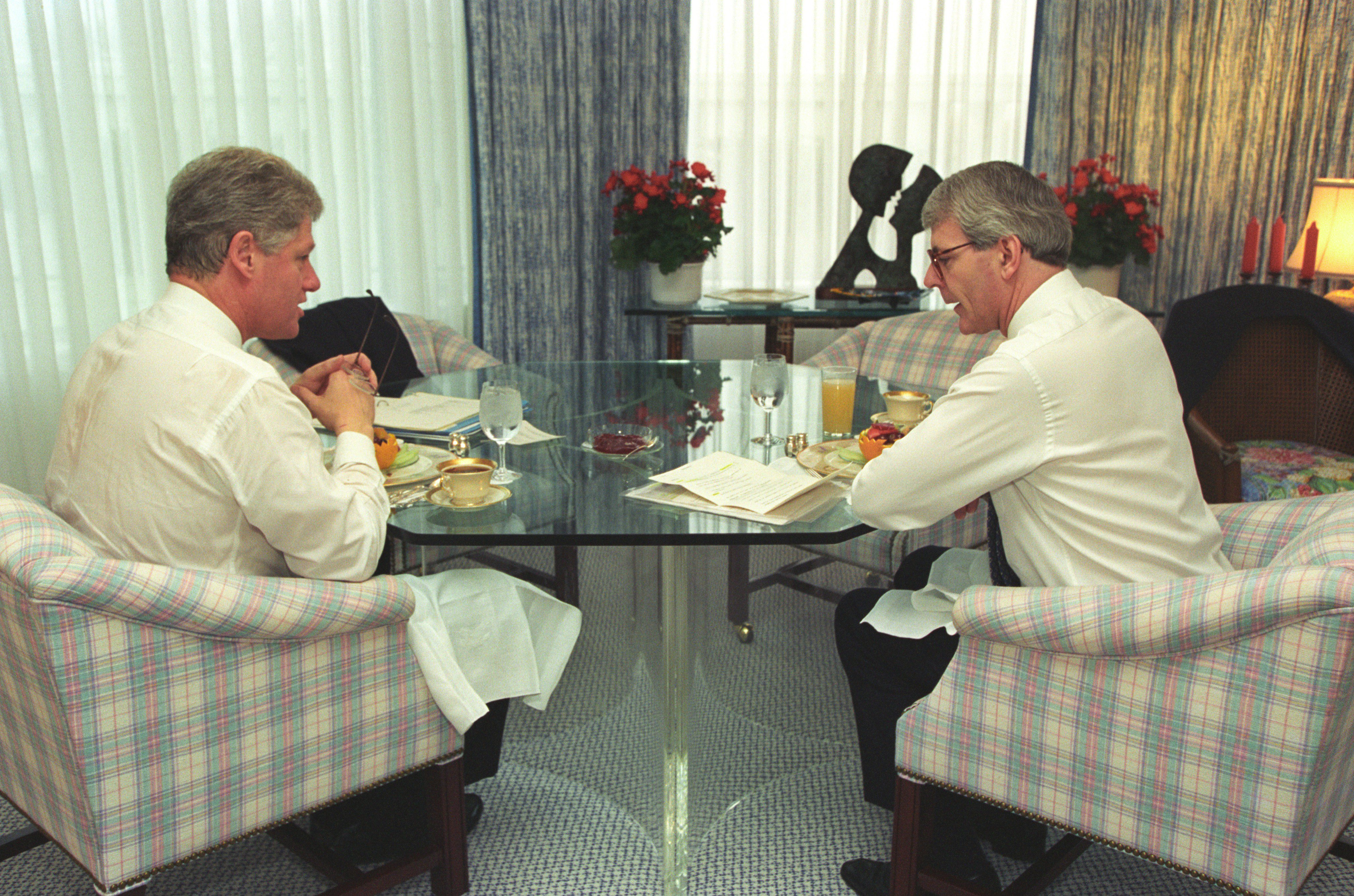

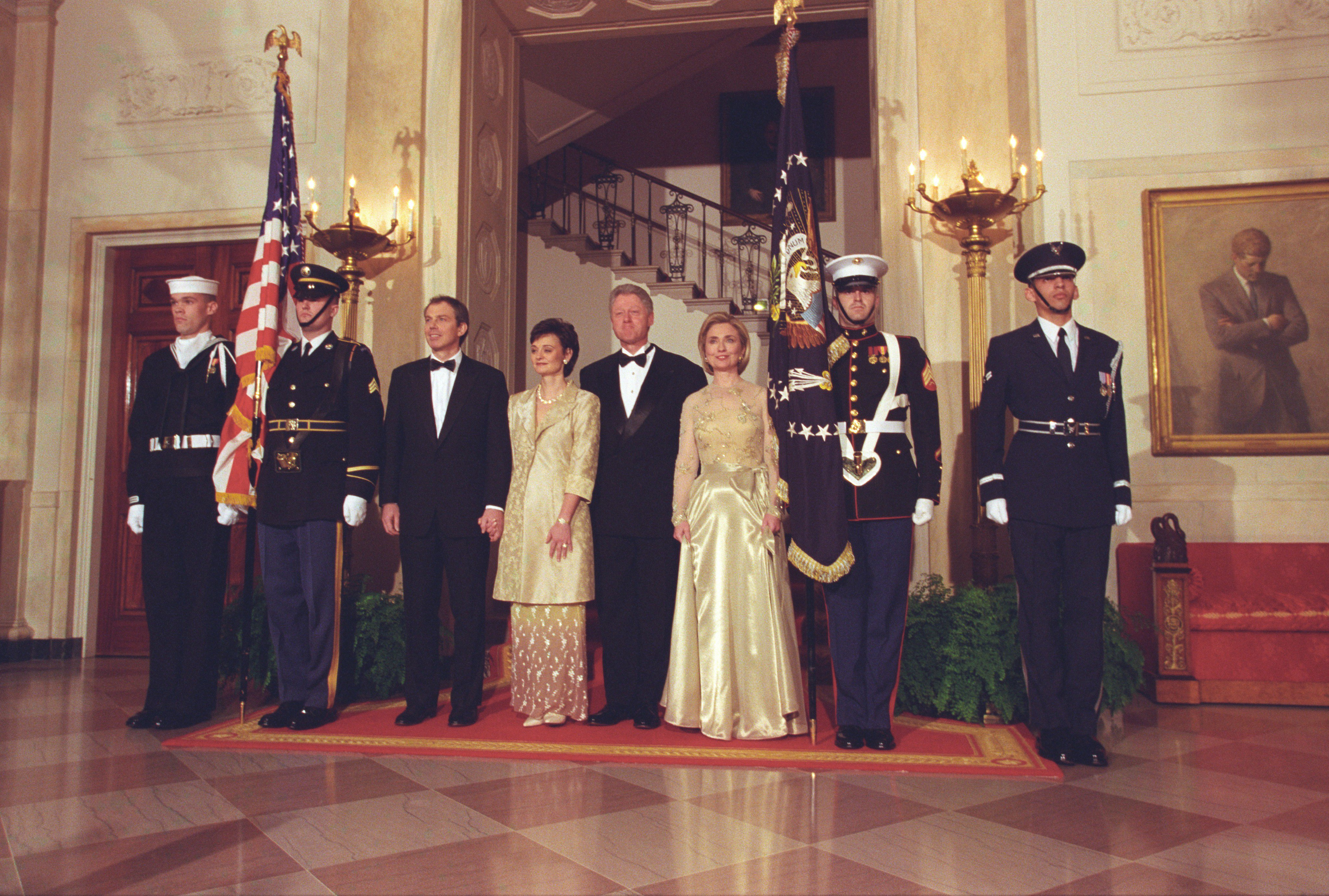

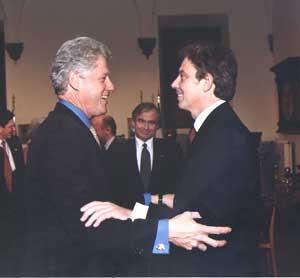

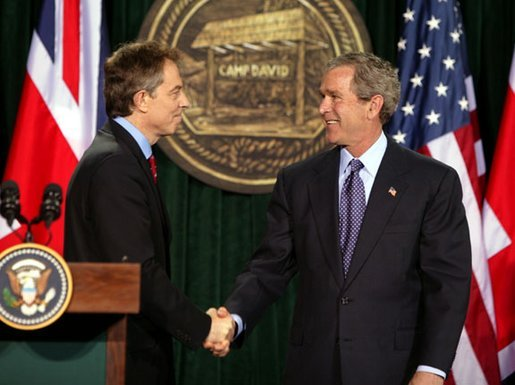

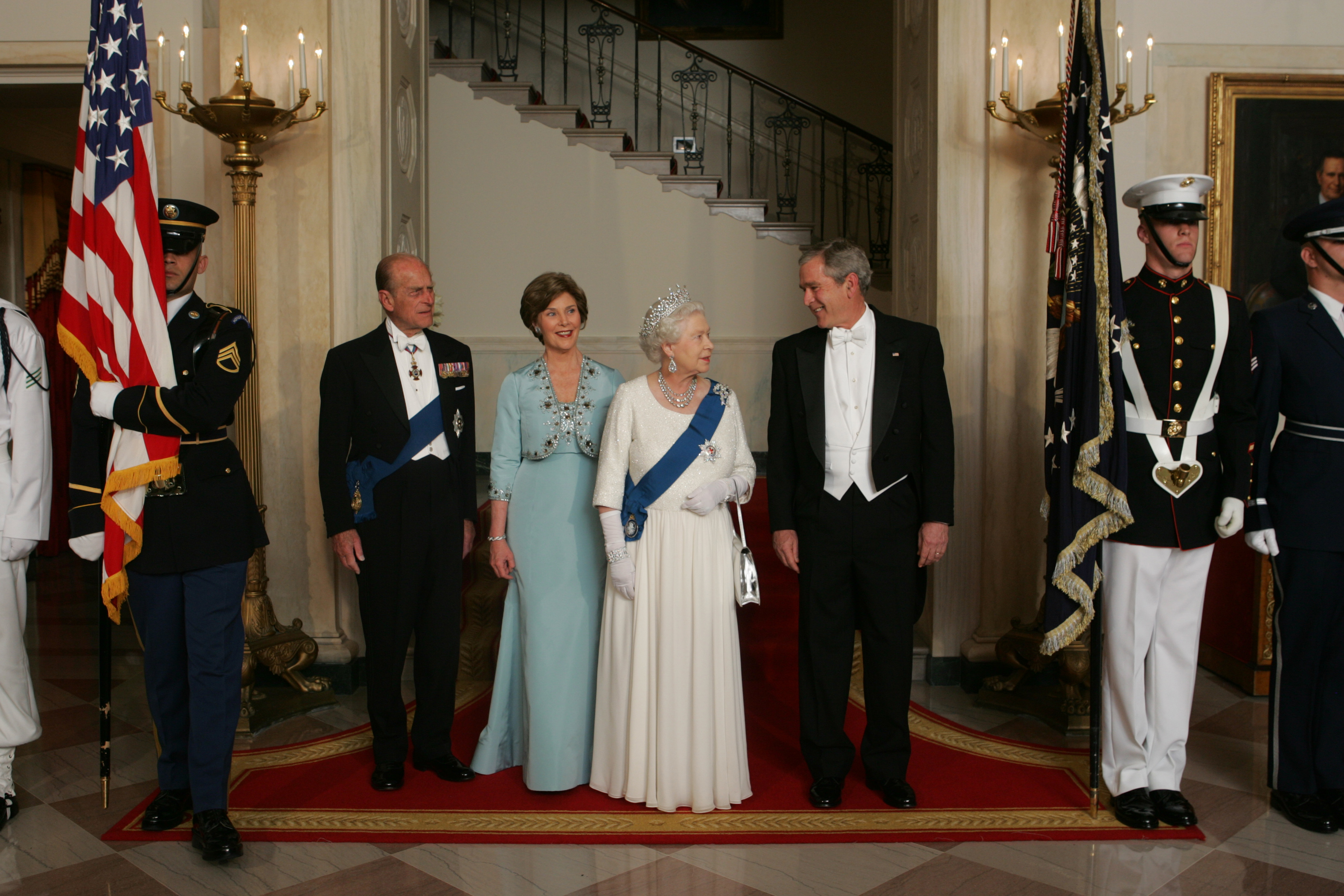

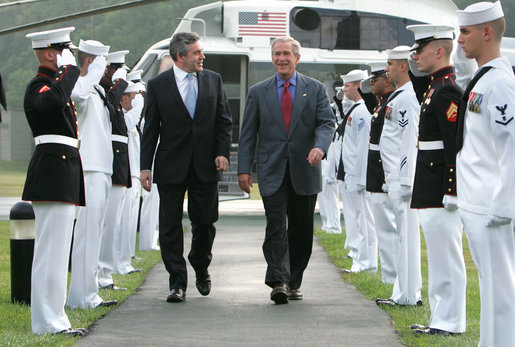

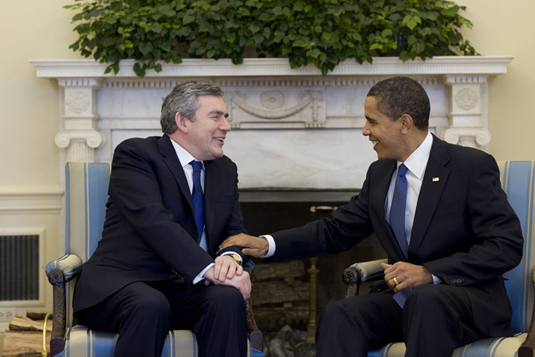

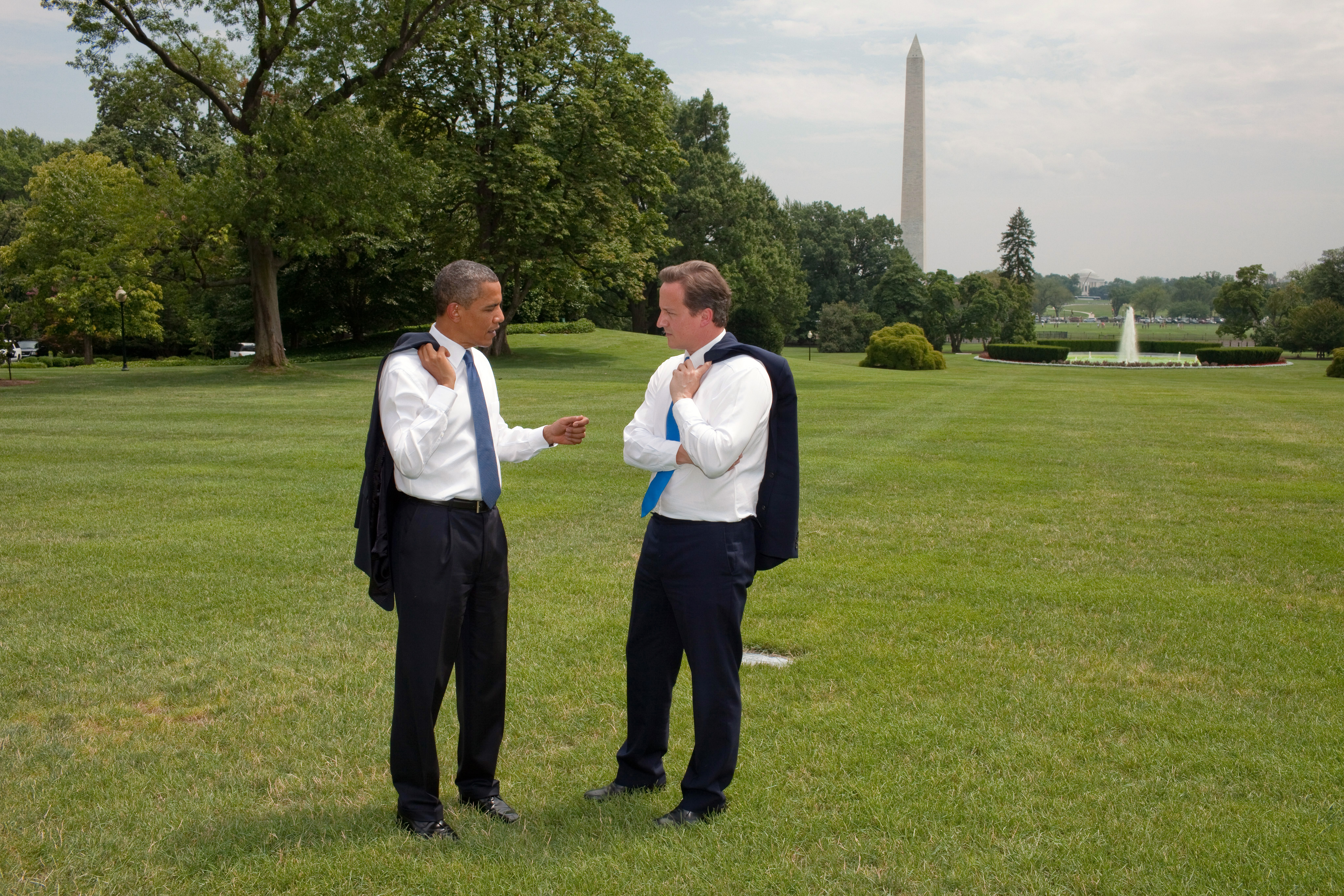

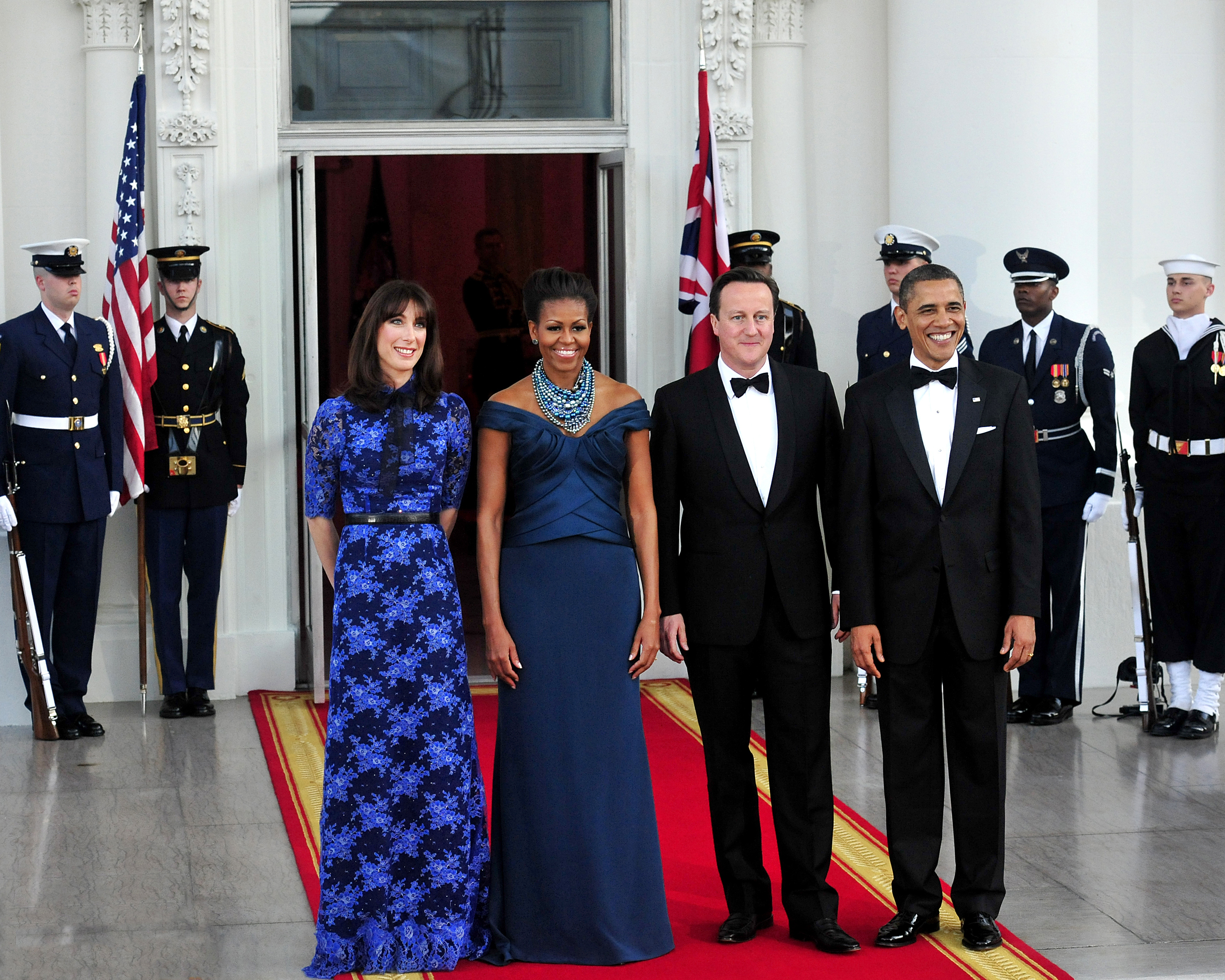

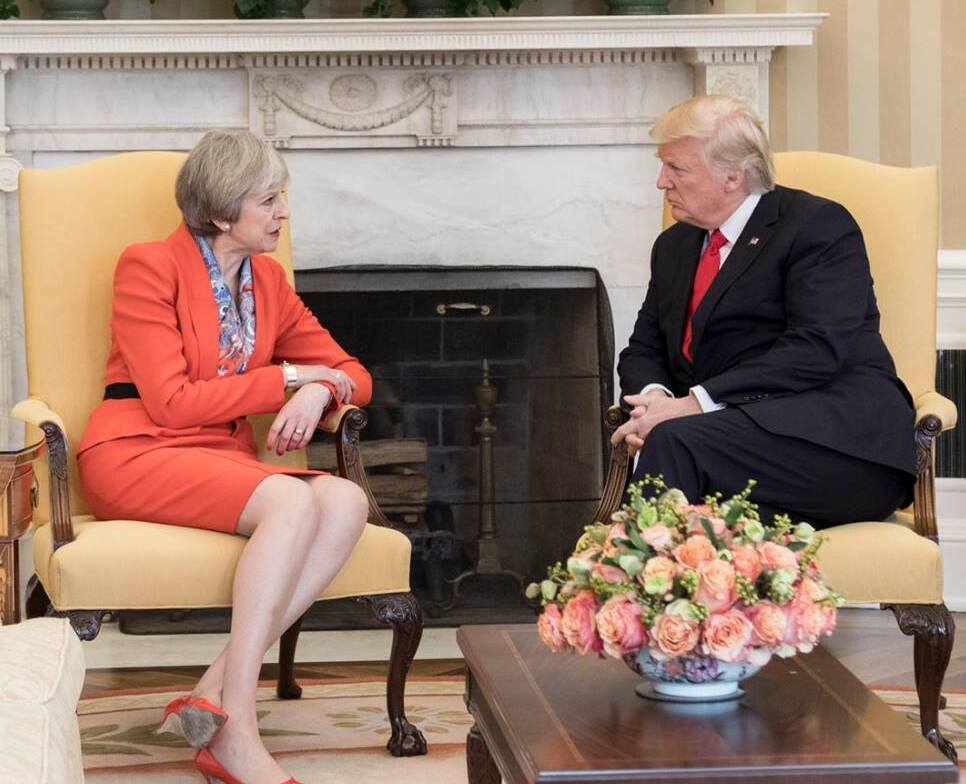

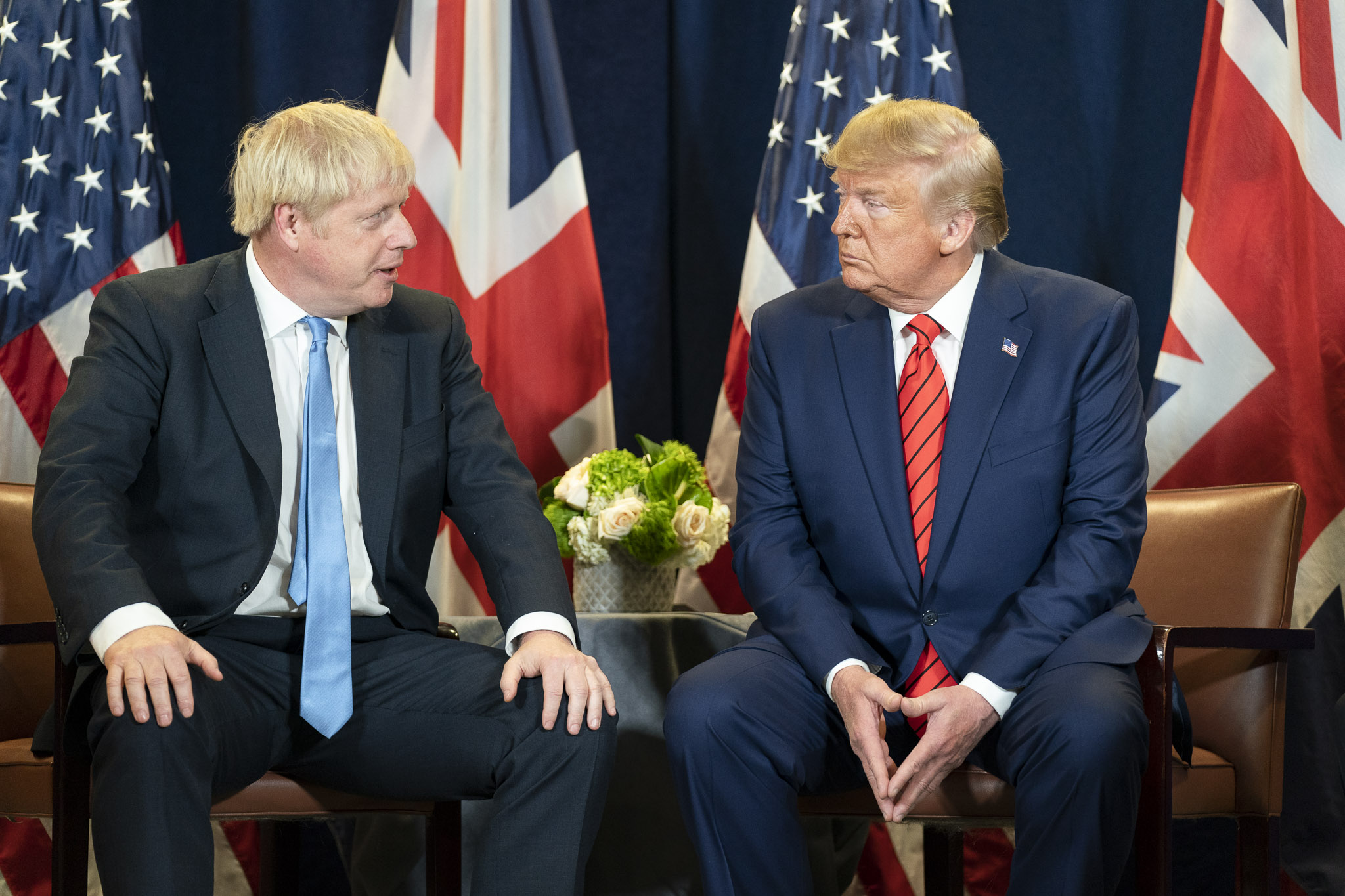

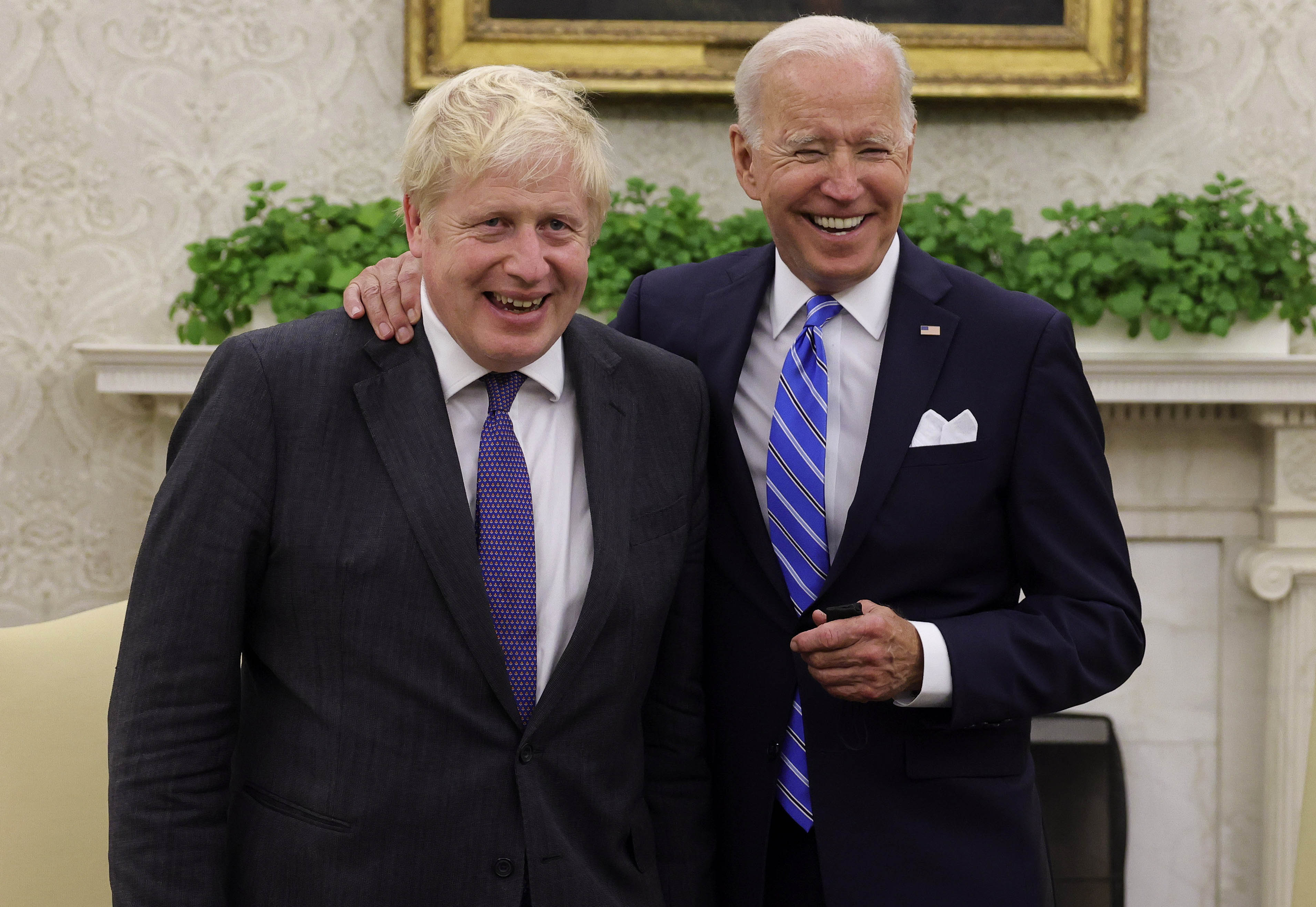

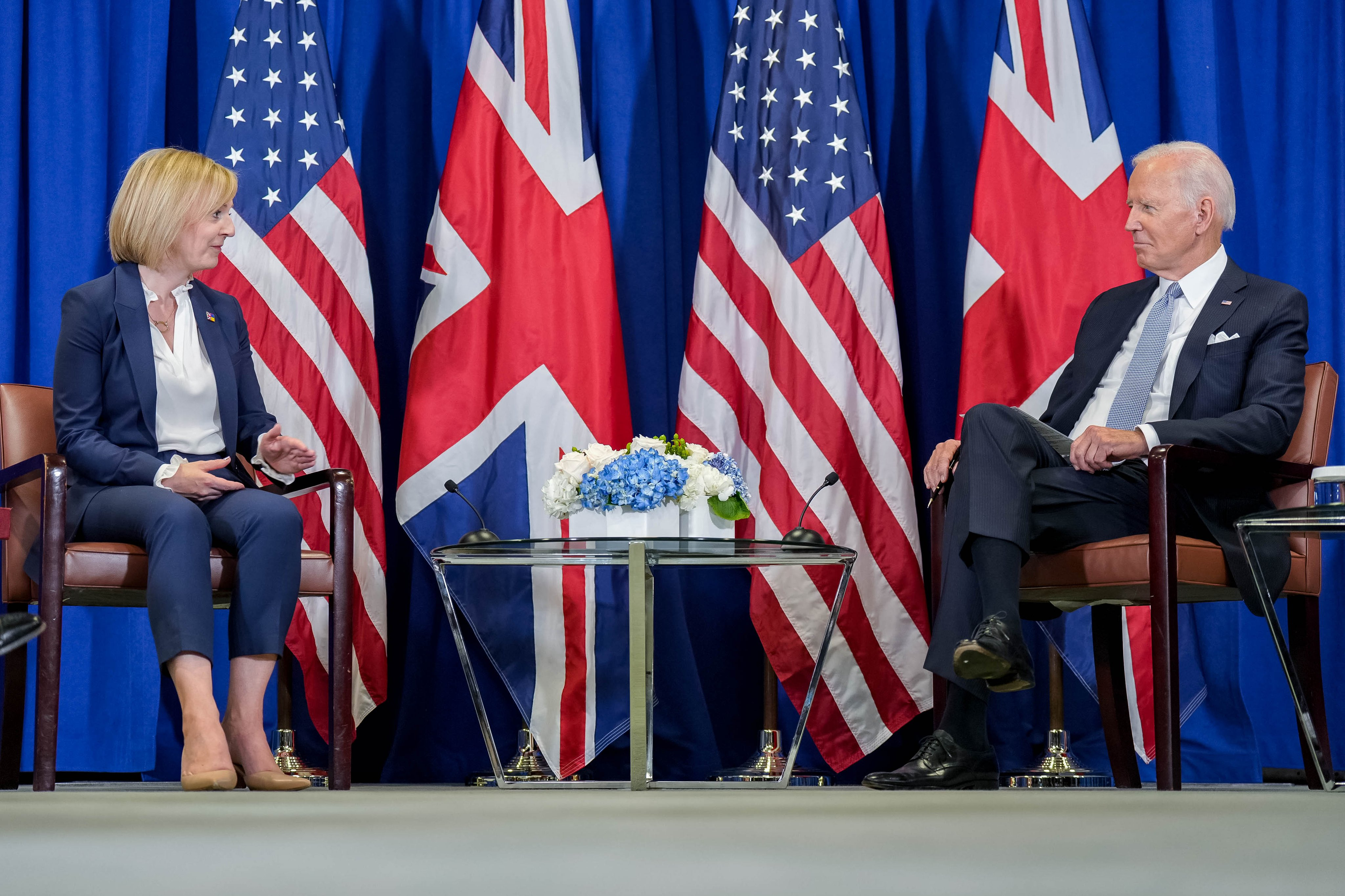

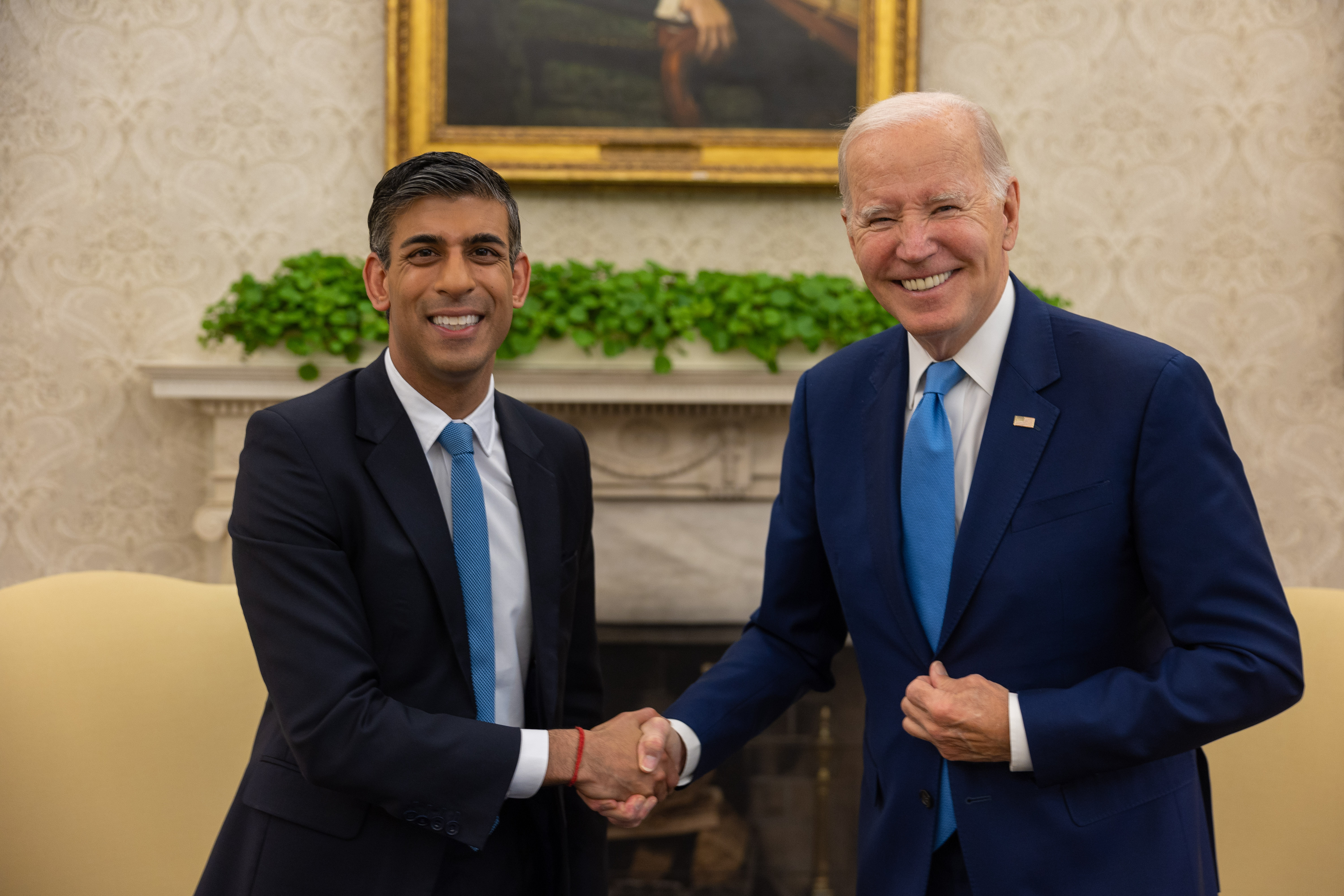

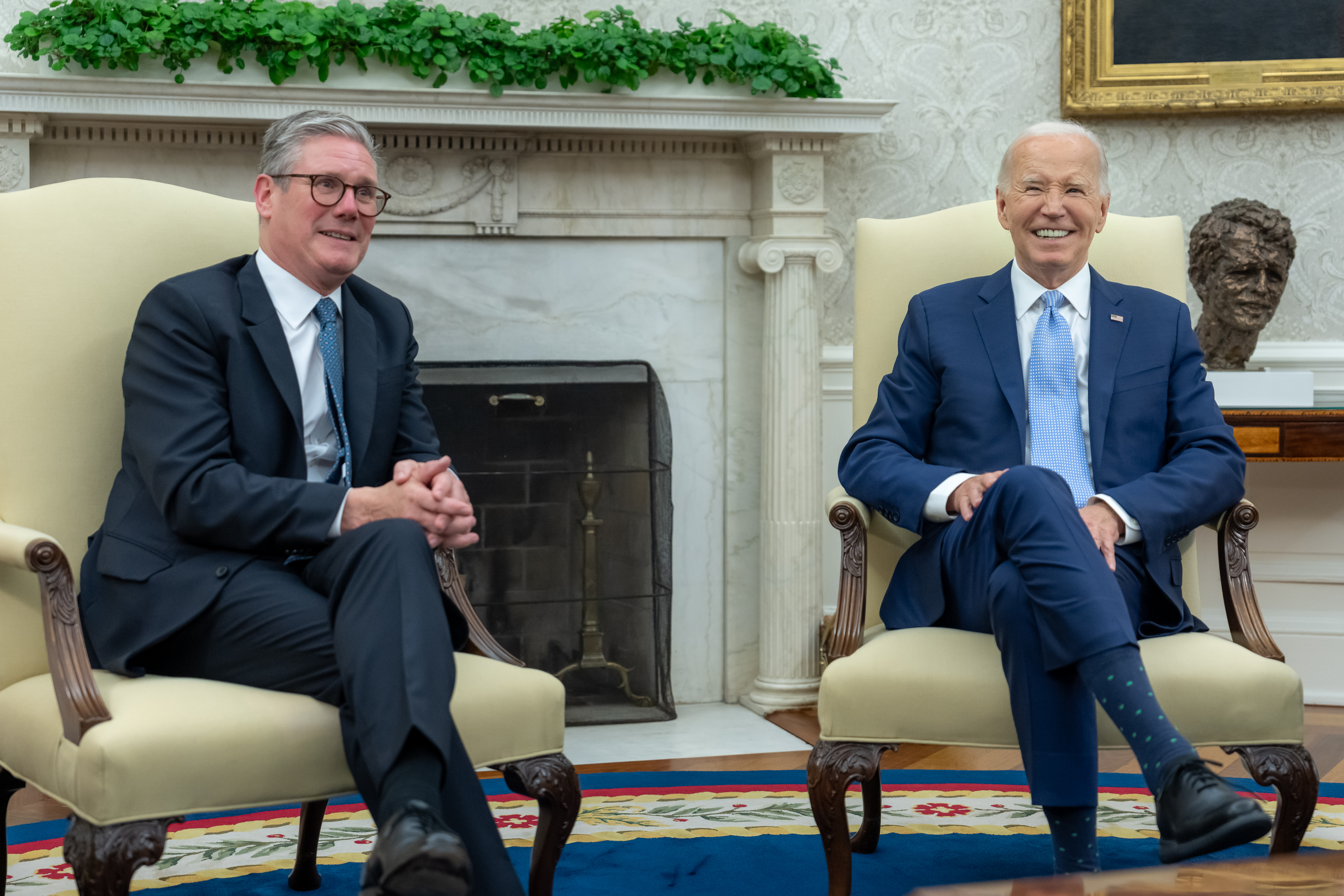

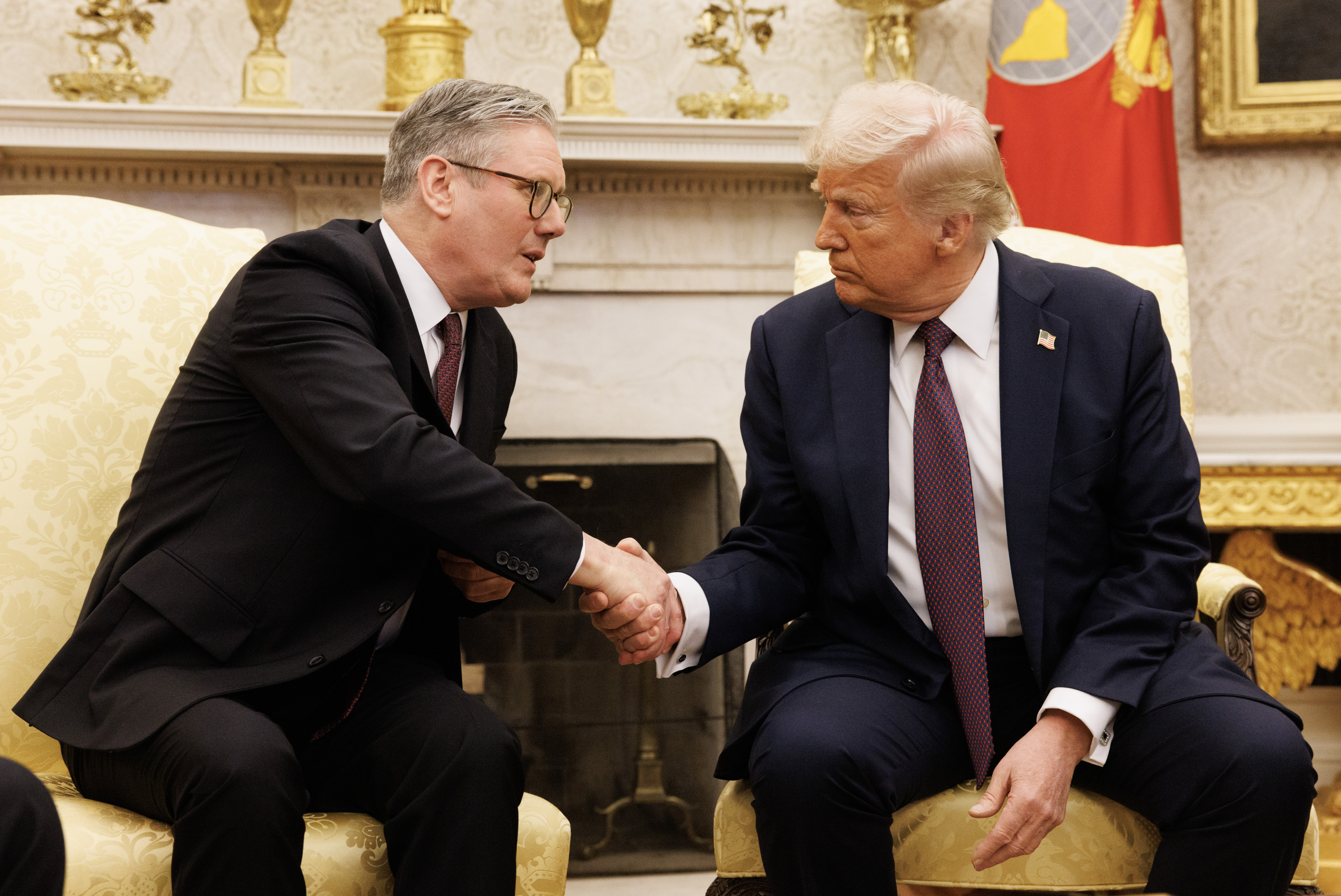

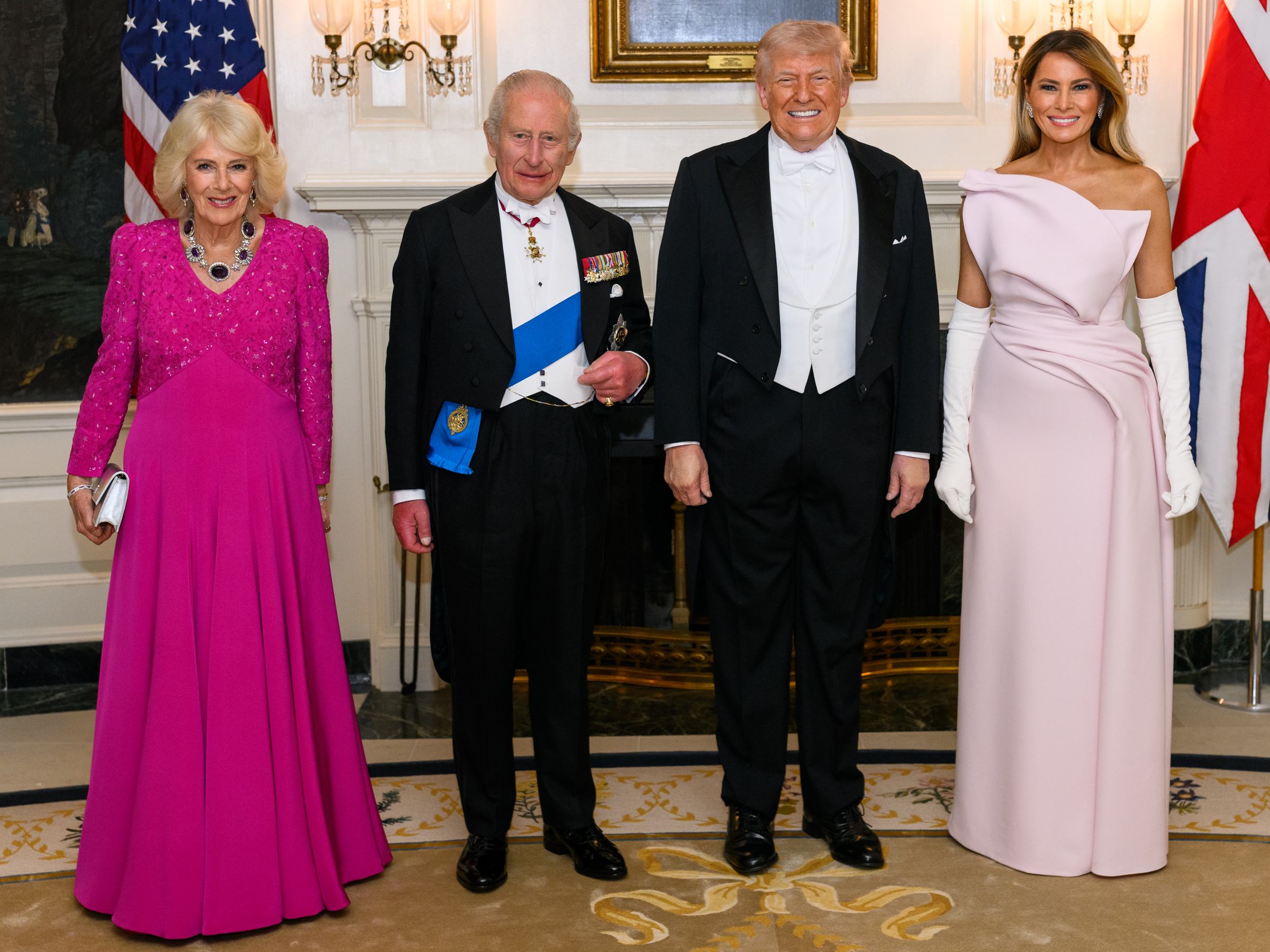

== Yugoslavia ==
Table of Trips
| Start | End | Guest | Title | Reason |
|---|---|---|---|---|
| June 21, 1942 | June 27, 1942 | Peter II | King | Guest of U.S. Government at invitation of the President. In U.S. June 21 – July 29, visiting Detroit, New York City, Lake Placid. Addressed U.S. Congress June 25. |
| September 22, 1960 | September 22, 1960 | Josip Broz Tito | President | Met with President Eisenhower in New York City while attending UN General Assembly session. |
| October 17, 1963 | October 17, 1963 | Josip Broz Tito | President | Informal visit. In U.S. October 16–25, visited Williamsburg, Yosemite Park, San Francisco, New York City, and Princeton. |
| October 24, 1970 | October 24, 1970 | Mitja Ribičič | Prime Minister | Attended White House dinner on 25th Anniversary of the U.N. |
| October 27, 1971 | October 30, 1971 | Josip Broz Tito | President | State visit. Afterwards visited Houston, Palm Springs, and Los Angeles. Departed U.S. November 2. |
| March 19, 1975 | March 21, 1975 | Dzemal Bijedic | Prime Minister | Official visit. In U.S. March 18–22; visited Williamsburg and New York City. |
| March 6, 1978 | March 9, 1978 | Josip Broz Tito | President | State visit. |
| January 31, 1984 | February 2, 1984 | Mika Spiljak | President | Official working visit. Private visit to Los Angeles February 3–4. |
| May 31, 1985 | May 31, 1985 | Milka Planinc | Prime Minister | Private Visit. Met with President Reagan. |
| October 1, 1990 | October 1, 1990 | Borisav Jović | President | Met with President Bush at the U.N. General Assembly. |
| May 9, 2001 | May 9, 2001 | Vojislav Koštunica | President | Met with President Bush during a private visit. Also visited New York City, May 8. |

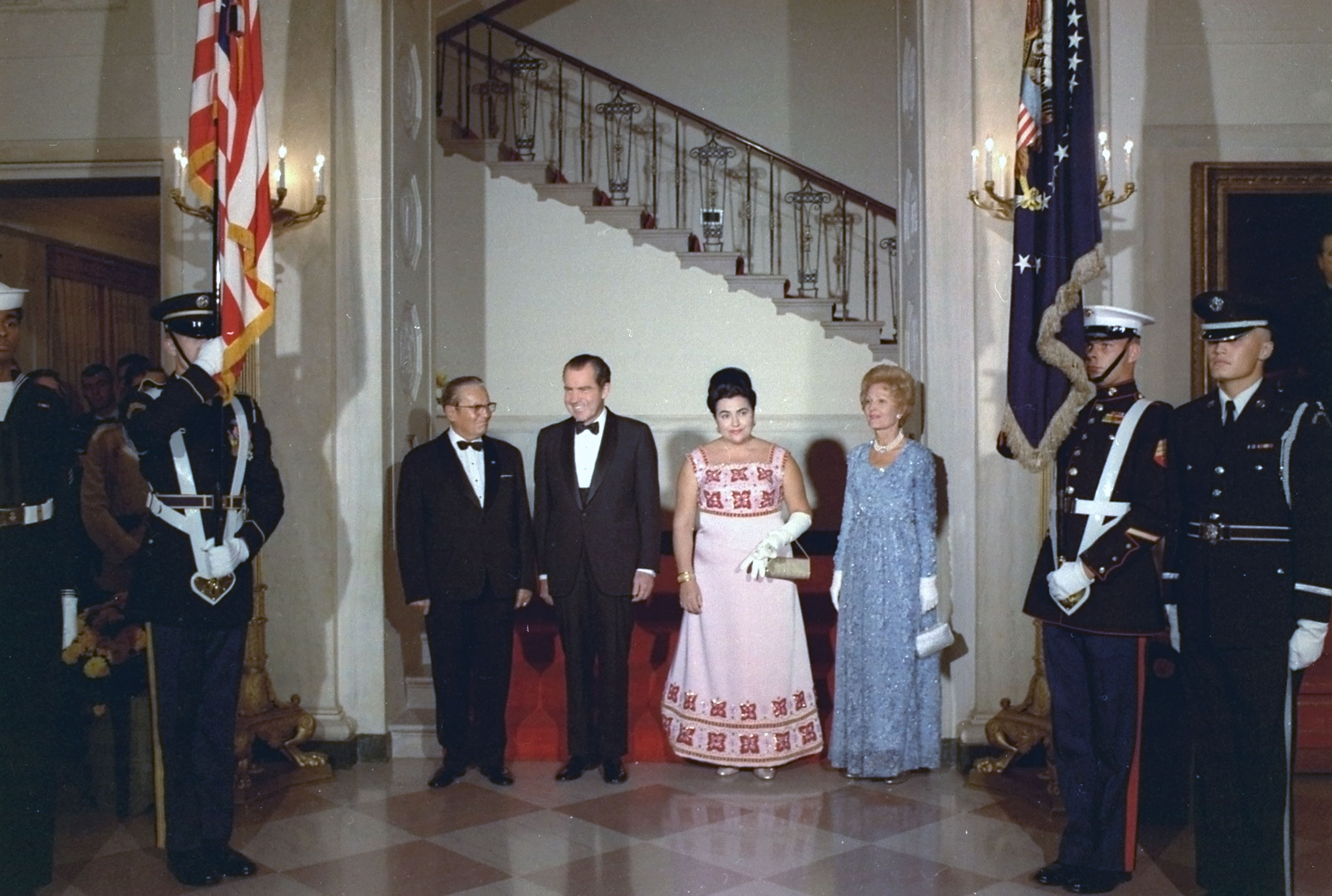

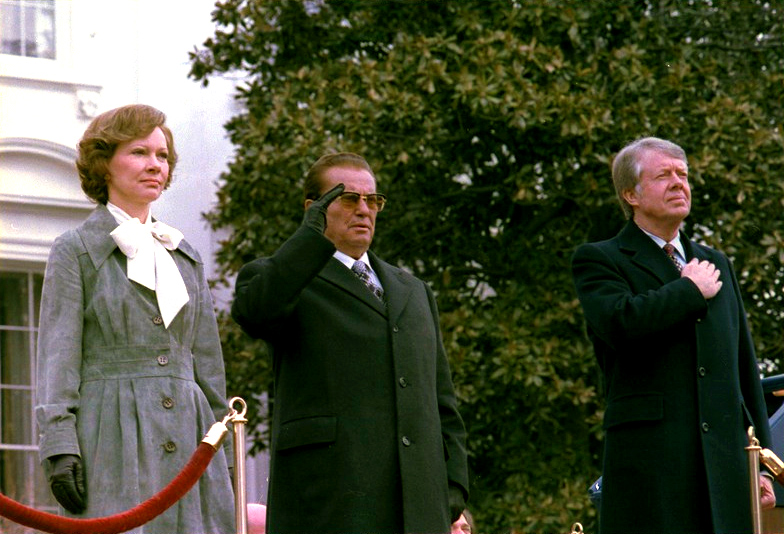

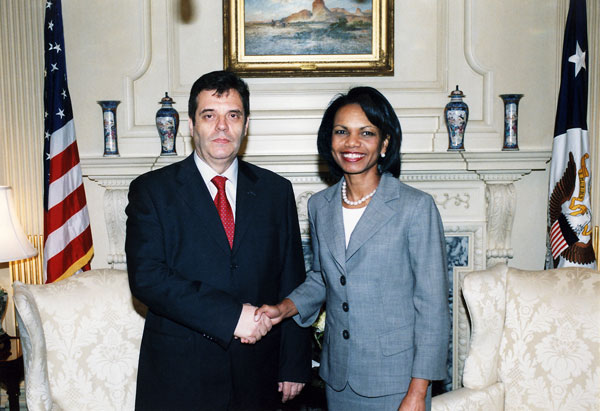

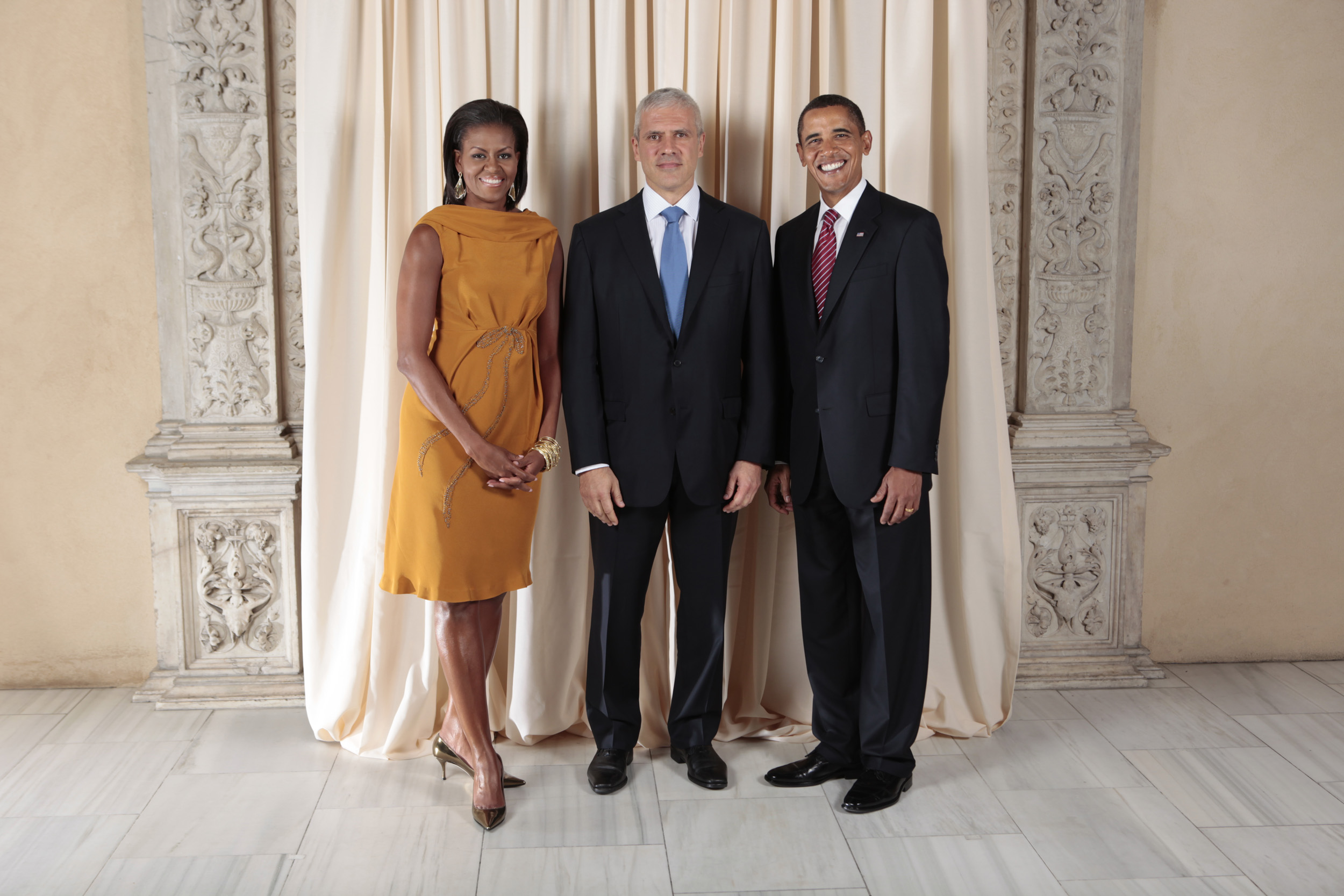

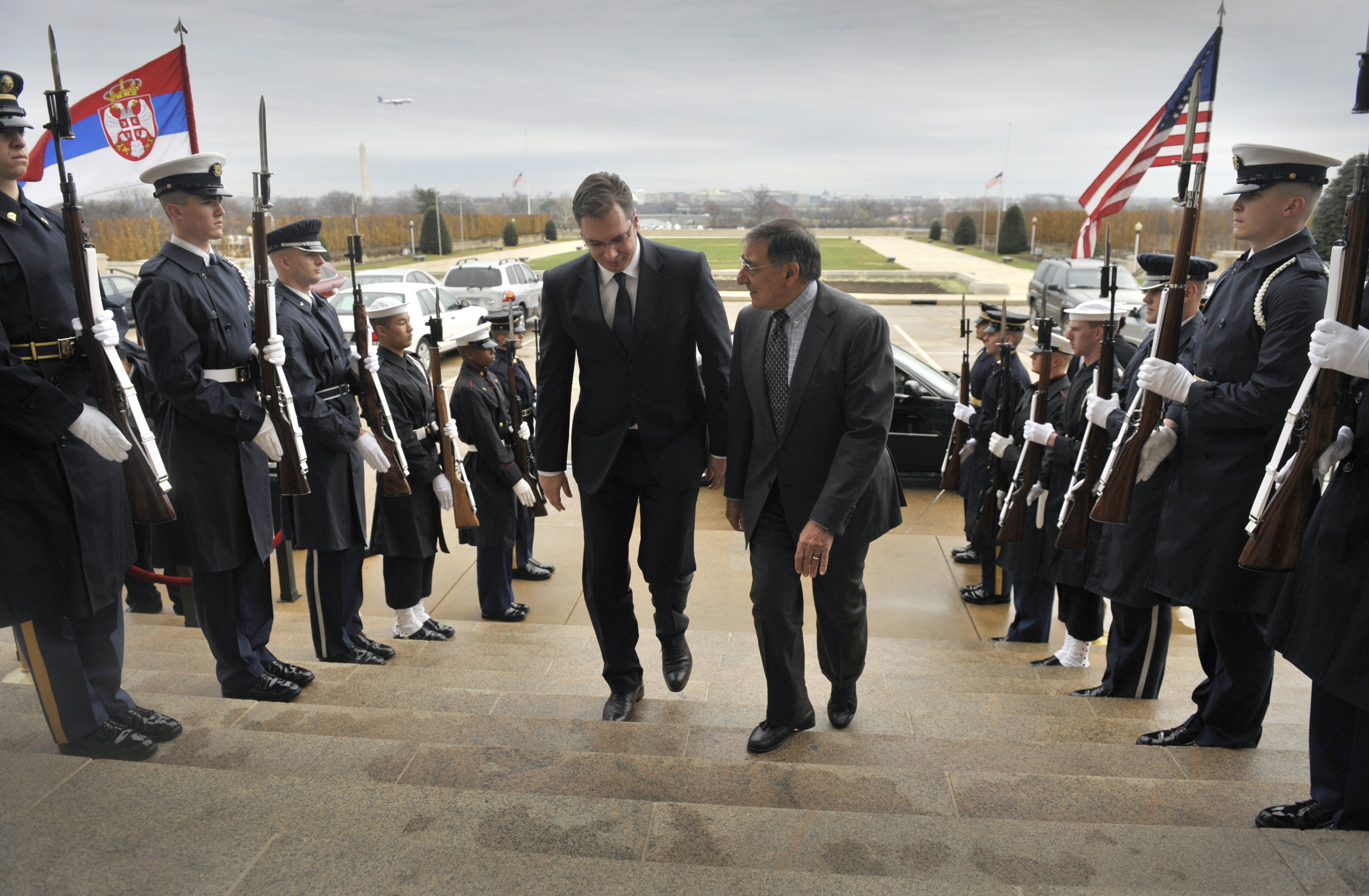

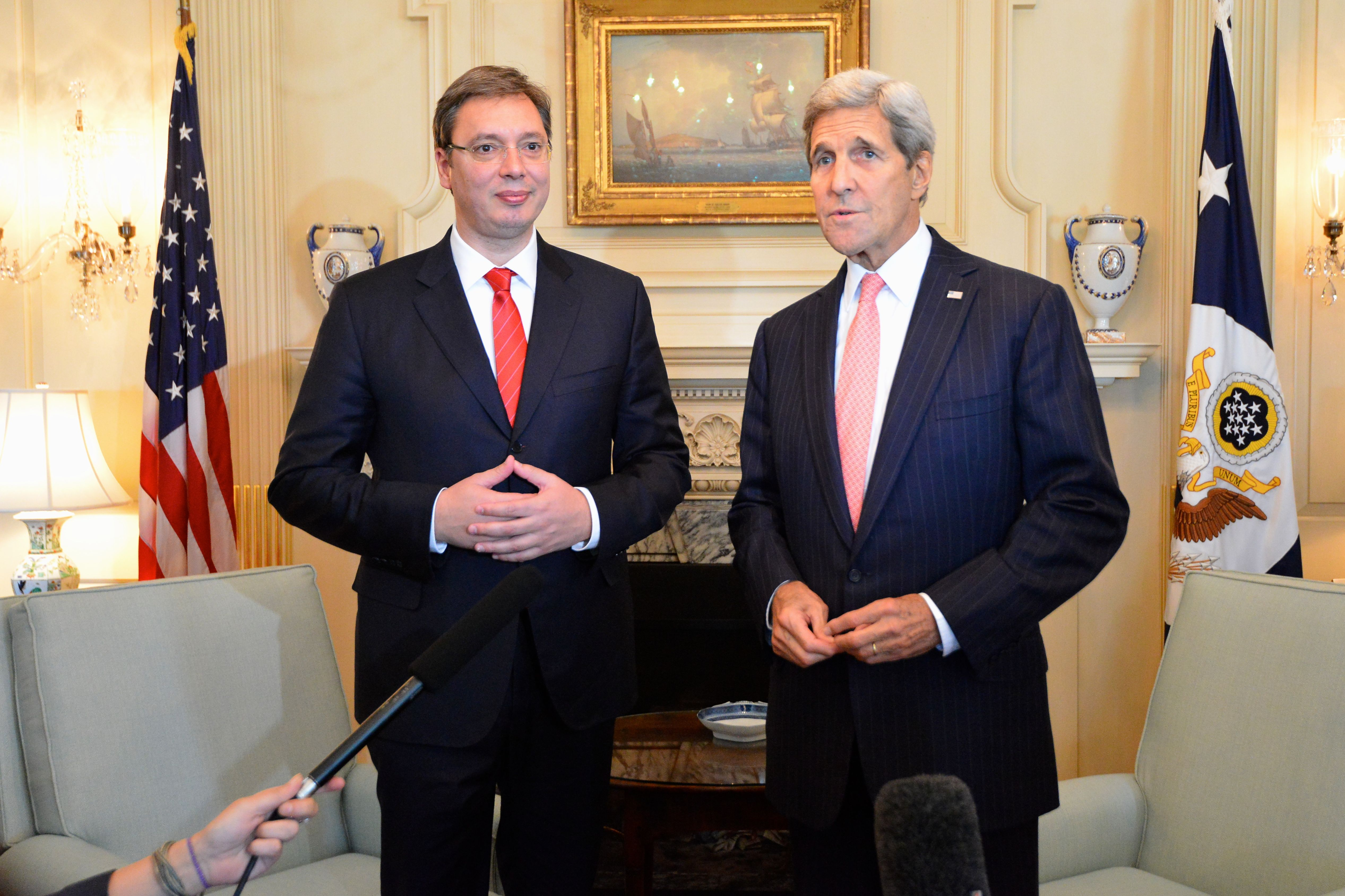

== Holy See (Vatican City) ==
Table of Trips
| Start | End | Guest | Title | Reason |
|---|---|---|---|---|
| October 4, 1965 | October 4, 1965 | Paul VI | Pope | Met President Johnson in New York City. Also addressed the UN General Assembly, presided over mass at Yankee Stadium, and attended the New York World's Fair. |
| October 6, 1979 | October 7, 1979 | John Paul II | Pope | Pastoral visit. In the U.S. October 1; visited Boston, New York City, Philadelphia, Des Moines, and Chicago. Met with President Carter October 6. |
| September 10, 1987 | September 11, 1987 | John Paul II | Pope | Pastoral visit. In U.S. September 10–19. Met with President Reagan in Miami; visited Columbia, New Orleans, San Antonio, Phoenix, Los Angeles, Monterey, San Francisco, and Detroit. |
| August 12, 1993 | August 12, 1993 | John Paul II | Pope | Met with President Clinton in Denver, celebrated World Youth Day. Departed August 15. |
| October 4, 1995 | October 4, 1995 | John Paul II | Pope | Pastoral visit. Met with President Clinton in Newark; addressed the U.N. General Assembly in New York City. Also visited Baltimore. Departed the U.S. October 8. |
| April 15, 2008 | April 18, 2008 | Benedict XVI | Pope | Pastoral visit. Met with President Bush at the White House. Also visited New York City April 18–20 and addressed the UN General Assembly. |
| September 22, 2015 | September 27, 2015 | Francis | Pope | Pastoral visit. Met with President Obama at the White House. Also visited New York City September 24–26 and addressed the UN General Assembly, Philadelphia September 26–27. Departed September 27 |

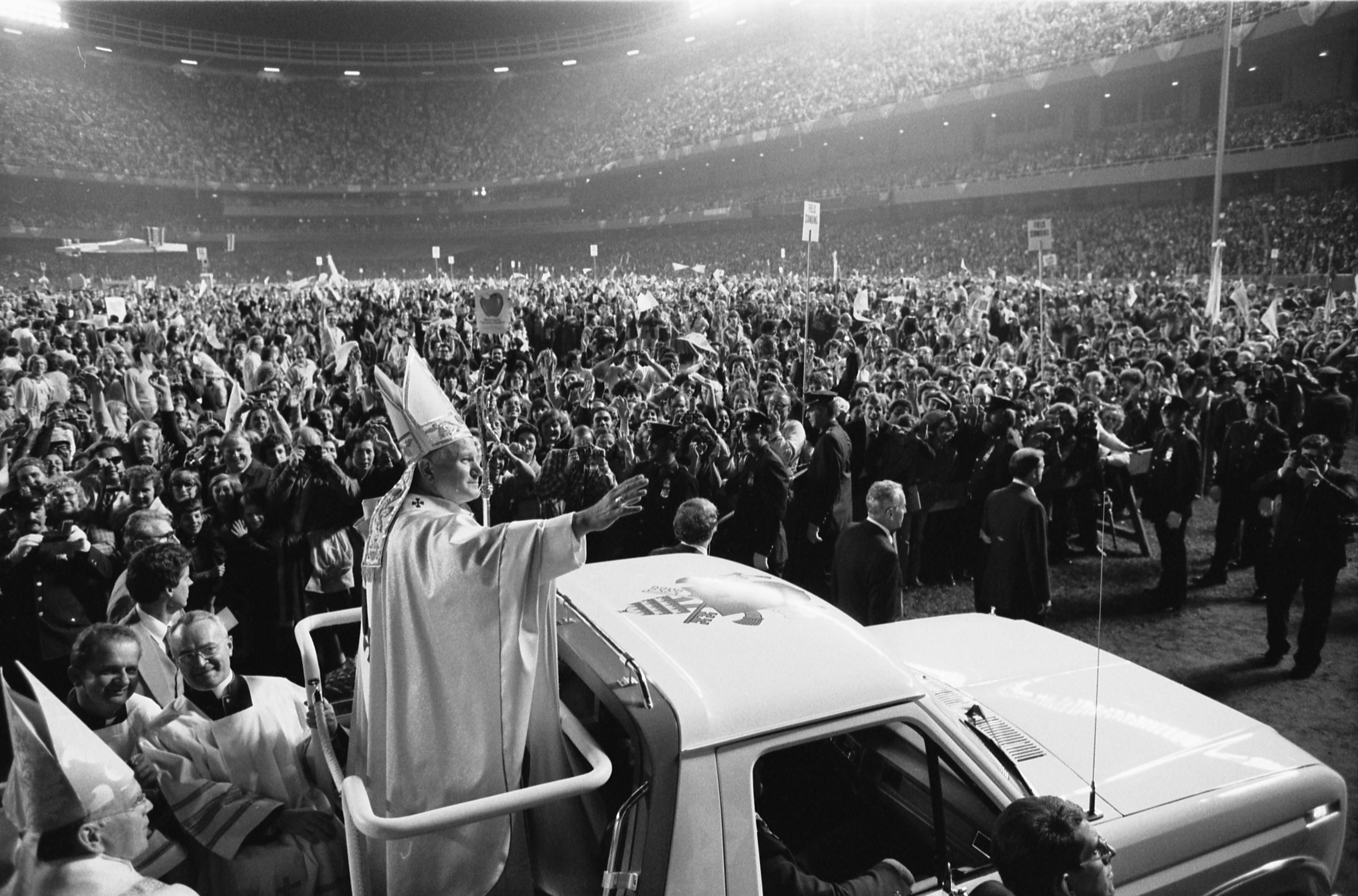

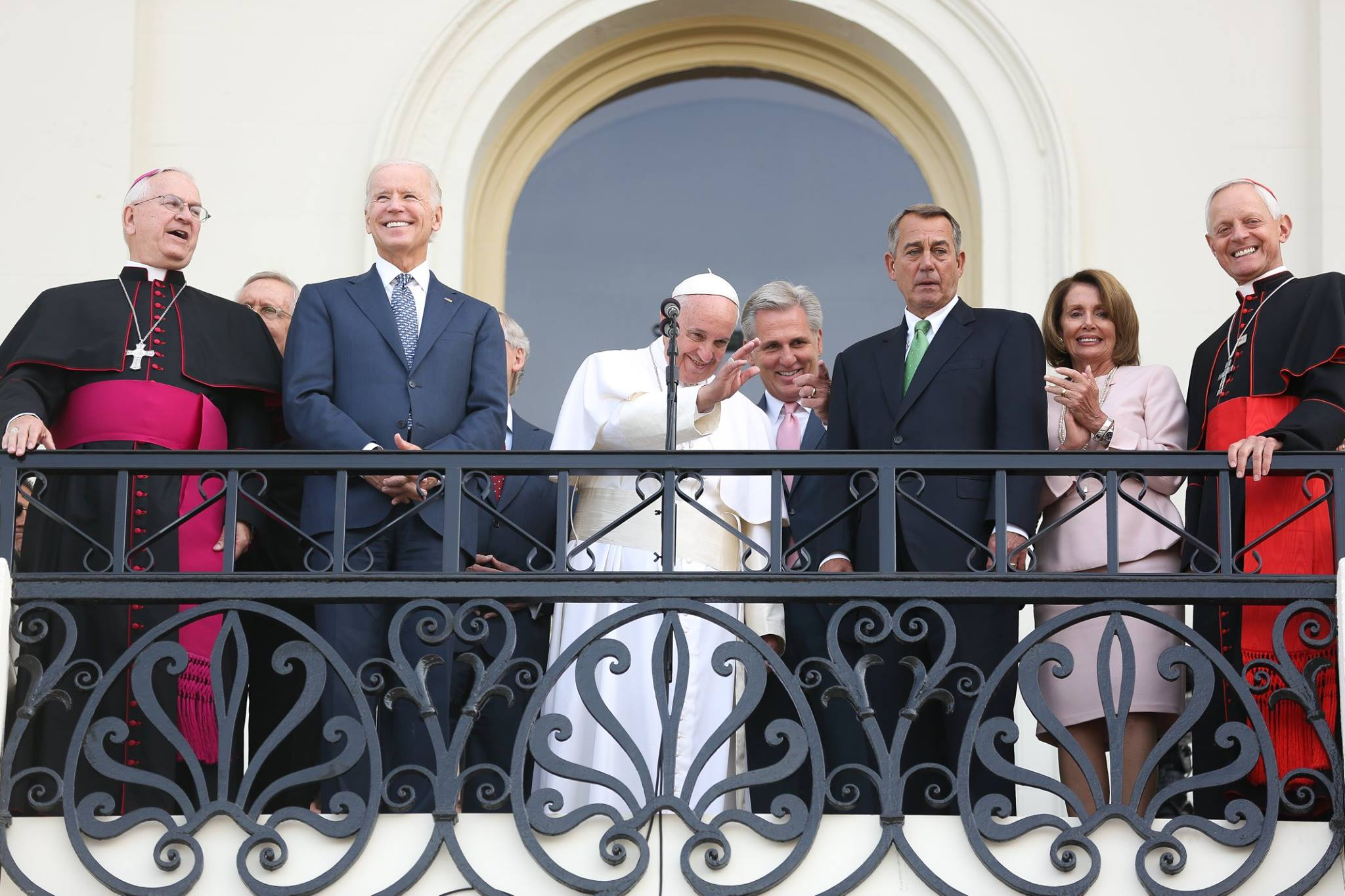

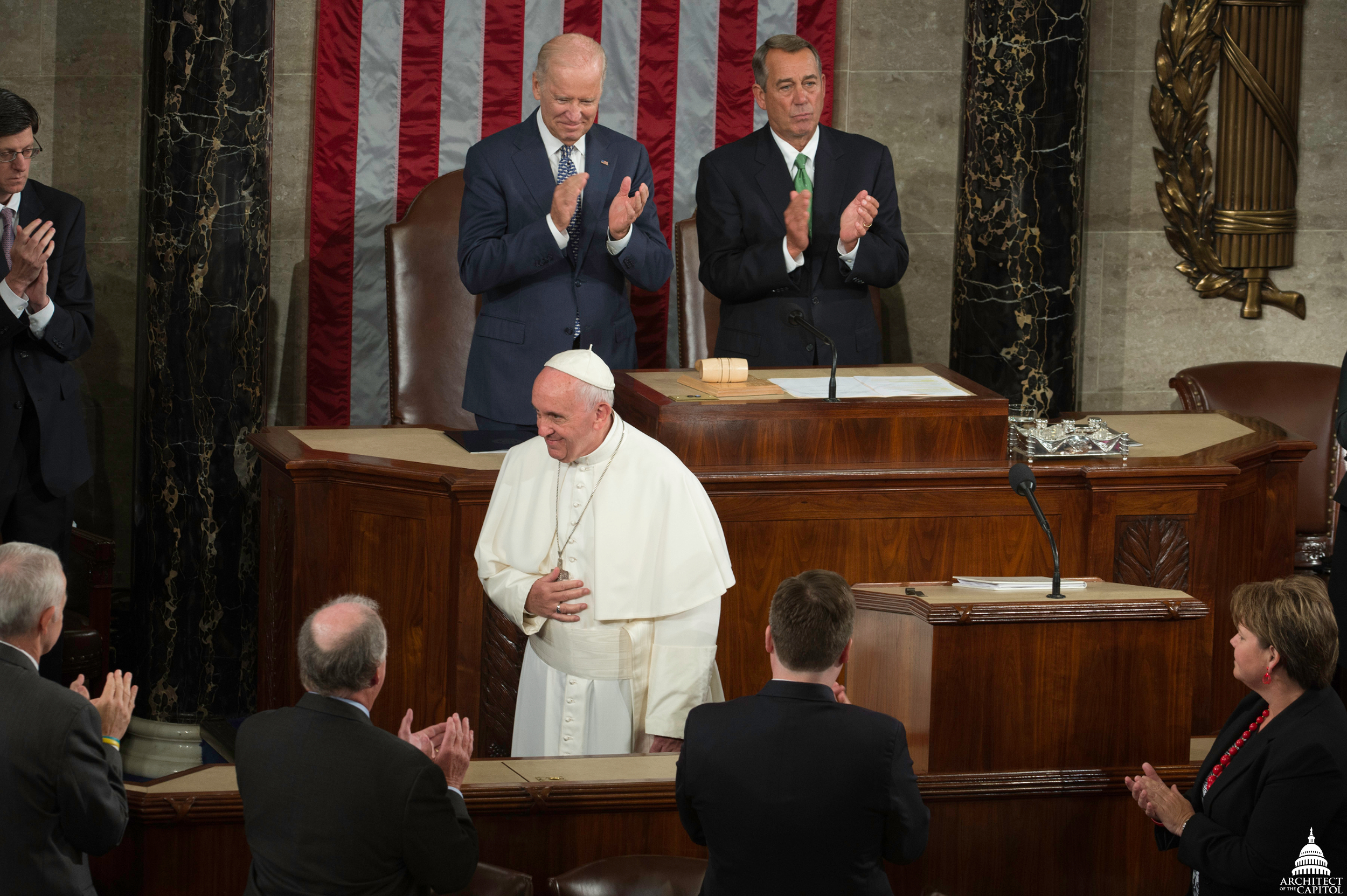

== See also ==
- Foreign policy of the United States
- Foreign relations of the United States
- List of international trips made by presidents of the United States
- List of diplomatic visits to the United States
- State visit
