= List of diplomatic visits to the United States from South America =

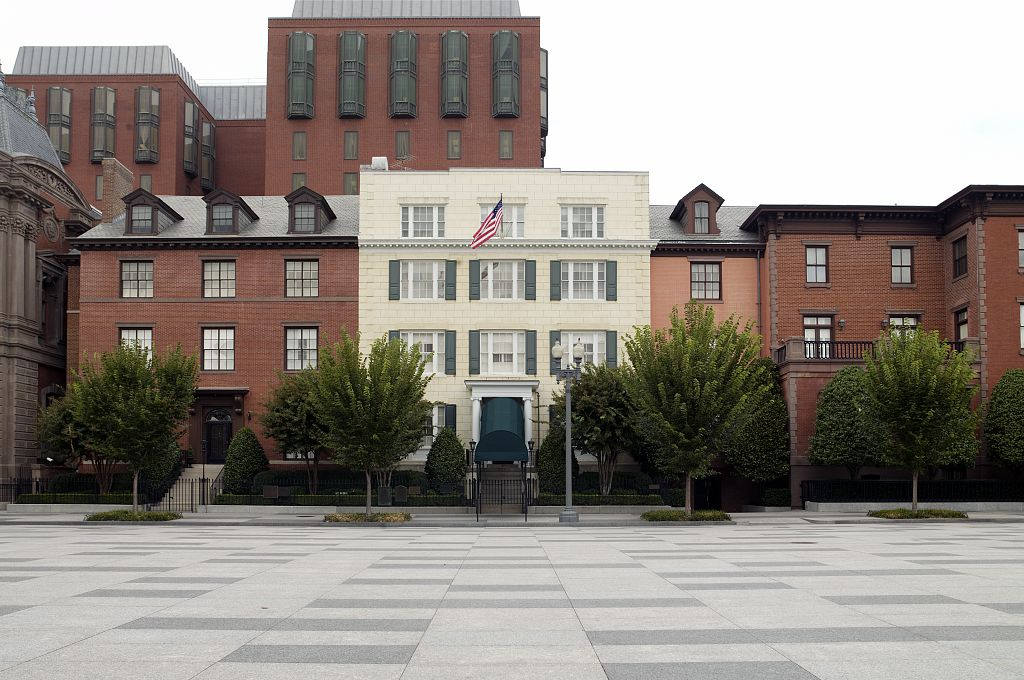
The President's Guest House, commonly known as Blair House has been the official guest house of visiting dignitaries in Washington D.C. since 1824

International trips made by the heads of state and heads of government to the United States have become a valuable part of American diplomacy and international relations since such trips were first made in the mid-19th century. They are complicated undertakings that often require months of planning along with a great deal of coordination and communication.

The first international visit to the United States was made by King Kalakaua of Hawaii in 1874, which was the first visit by a foreign chief of state or head of government.

The first South American head of state to visit the United States was Emperor Pedro II of Brazil in 1876.

== Argentina ==
Table of Trips
Start	End	Guest	Title	Reason
January 20, 1959	January 23, 1959	Arturo Frondizi	President	State visit. In U.S. January 19 – February 1, visited Miami, Houston, Chicago, Detroit, and New York City. Addressed U.S. Congress January 21.
September 26, 1961	September 26, 1961	Arturo Frondizi	President	Met with President Kennedy in New York City while attending UN General Assembly session.
December 24, 1961	December 24, 1961	Arturo Frondizi	President	Met with President Kennedy at Palm Beach. In U.S. December 21–25; visiting Honolulu and New Orleans.
September 6, 1977	September 9, 1977	Jorge Rafael Videla	President	Attended signing of the Panama Canal Treaty.
March 15, 1981	March 118, 1981	Roberto Viola	President	Private visit. Met with President Reagan March 17.
August 23, 1984	August 23, 1984	Raúl Alfonsín	President	Private visit. Met with President Reagan at U.N. General Assembly reception in New York City.
March 18, 1985	March 20, 1985	Raúl Alfonsín	President	State Visit. In U.S. March 17–25; visited Williamsburg, New York City, Chicago, Albuquerque, and Houston. Addressed Joint Meeting of U.S. Congress March 20.
November 16, 1986	November 17, 1986	Raúl Alfonsín	President	Private Visit. Met with President Reagan November 17.
September 27, 1989	September 27, 1989	Carlos Menem	President	Met with President Bush during a private visit.
October 1, 1990	October 1, 1990	Carlos Menem	President	Met with President Bush at the U.N. General Assembly.
November 13, 1991	November 16, 1991	Carlos Menem	President	State Visit. Addressed Joint Meeting of U.S Congress on November 14.
June 28, 1993	June 30, 1993	Carlos Menem	President	Met with President Clinton during a private visit.
June 24, 1994	June 24, 1994	Carlos Menem	President	Met with President Clinton during a private visit.
December 9, 1994	December 11, 1994	Carlos Menem	President	Attended the Summit of the Americas in Miami
December 4–5, 1996	December 4–5, 1996	Carlos Menem	President	Met with President Clinton during a private visit.
January 11, 1999	January 12, 1999	Carlos Menem	President	State Visit
September 21, 1999	September 21, 1999	Carlos Menem	President	Met with President Clinton during a meeting of the United Nations General Assembly in New York City.
June 12, 2000	June 14, 2000	Fernando de la Rua	President	Official working visit.
April 19, 2001	April 19, 2001	Fernando de la Rua	President	Working visit.
November 11, 2001	November 11, 2001	Fernando de la Rua	President	Met with President Bush at the UN General Assembly in New York City.
July 22, 2003	July 23, 2003	Nestor Kirchner	President	Working visit.
November 14, 2008	November 15, 2008	Cristina Fernandez de Kirchner	President	Attended the G-20 Economic Summit meeting.
September 24, 2009	September 25, 2009	Cristina Fernandez de Kirchner	President	Attended the G-20 Economic Summit meeting in Pittsburgh.
April 12, 2010	April 13, 2010	Cristina Fernandez de Kirchner	President	Attended the Nuclear Security Summit.
March 31, 2016	April 1, 2016	Mauricio Macri	President	Attended the Nuclear Security Summit.
April 27, 2017	April 27, 2017	Mauricio Macri	President	Working luncheon.
June 8, 2022	June 10, 2022	Alberto Fernández	President	Attended the Summit of the Americas in Los Angeles, California.
March 29, 2023	March 29, 2023	Alberto Fernández	President	Working Visit.
January 20, 2025	January 20, 2025	Javier Milei	President	Invited to the presidential inauguration
October 14, 2025	October 14, 2025	Javier Milei	President	Working Visit.
February 19, 2026	February 19, 2026	Javier Milei	President	To attend the first meeting of the Board of Peace.

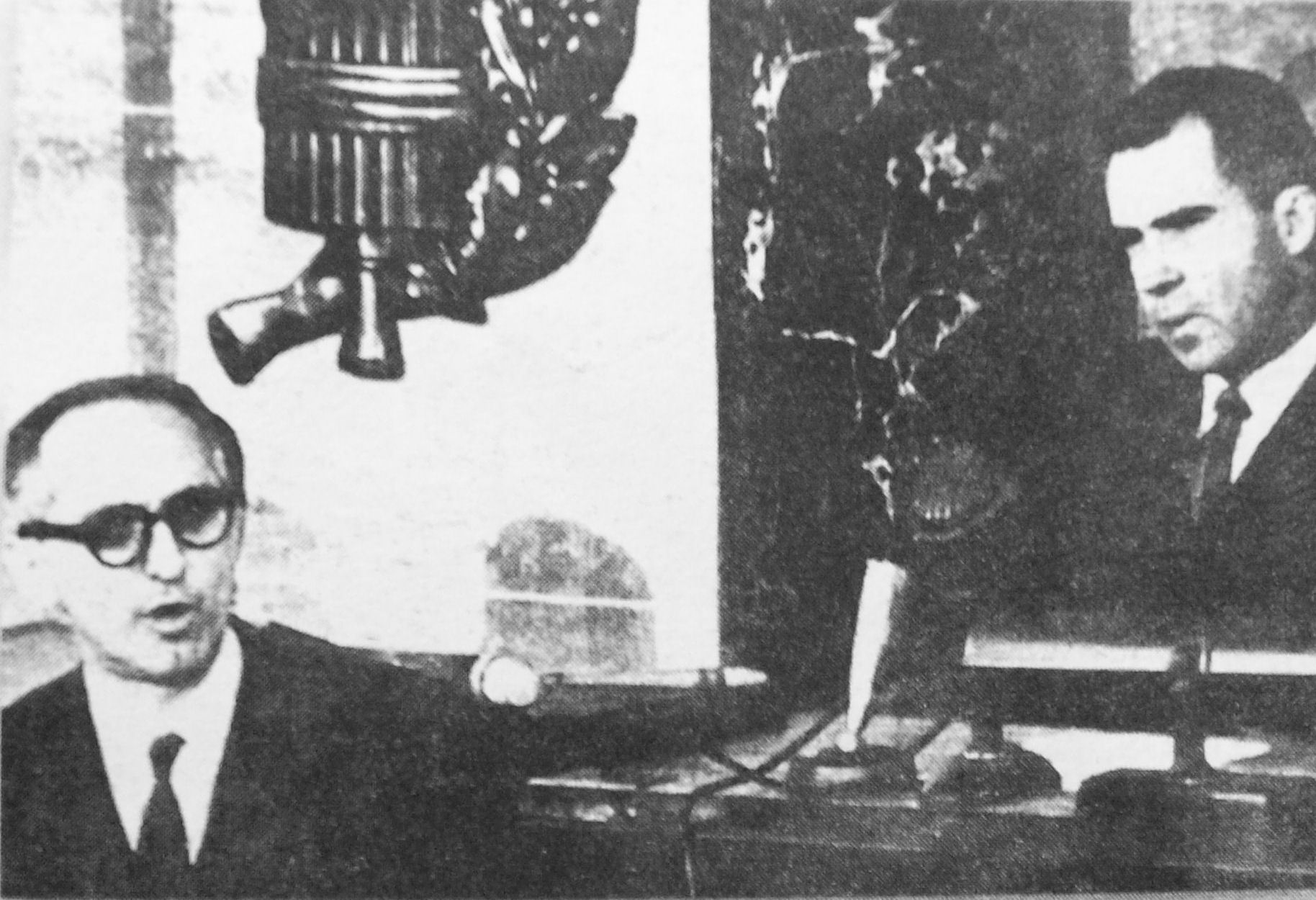

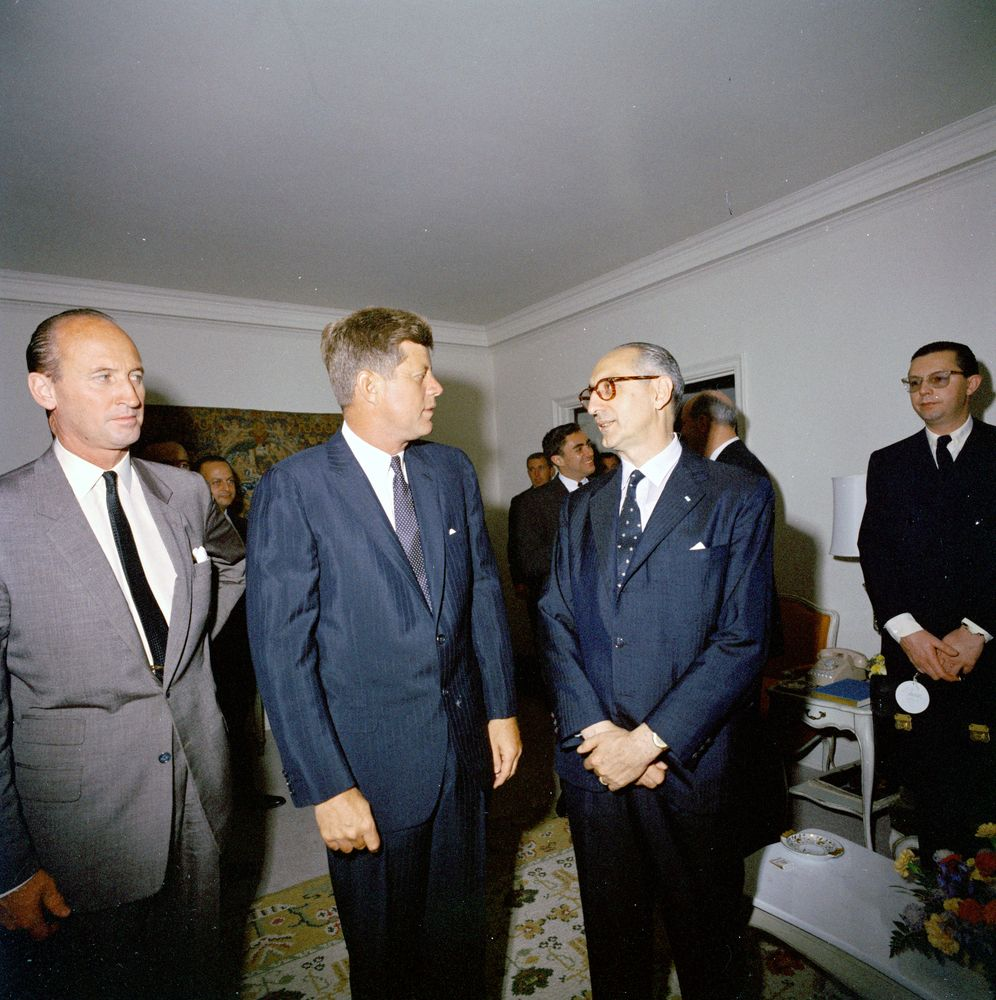

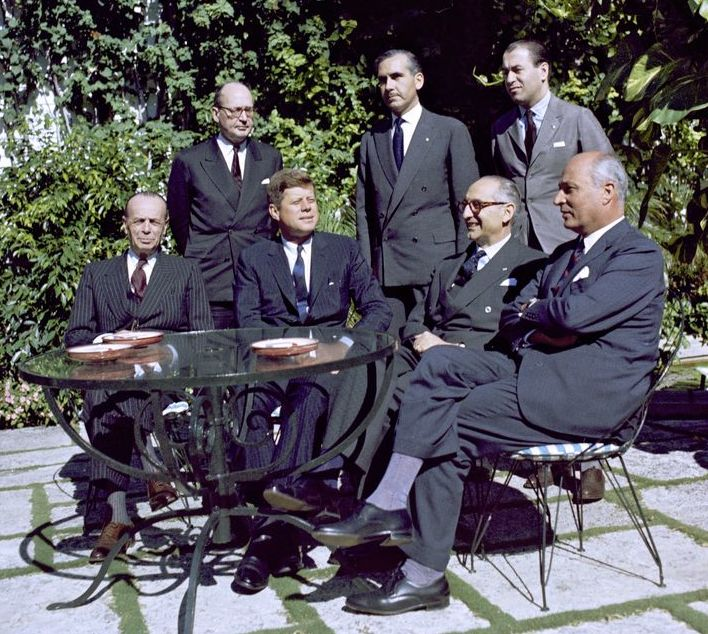

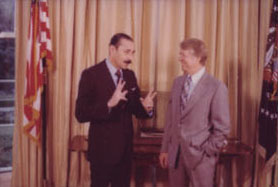

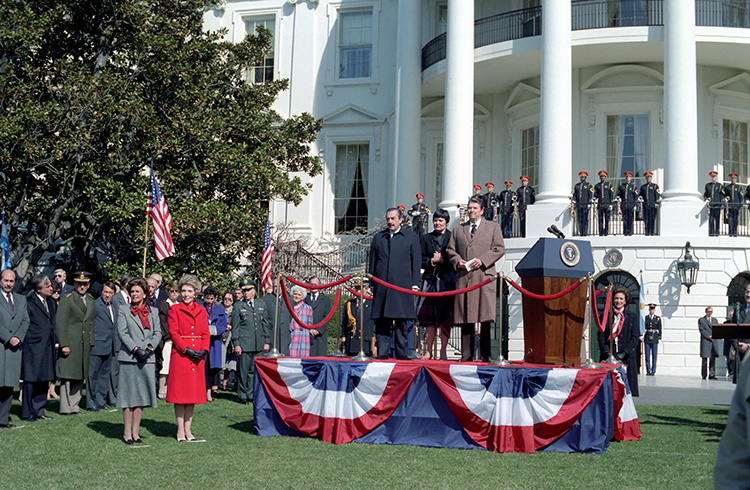

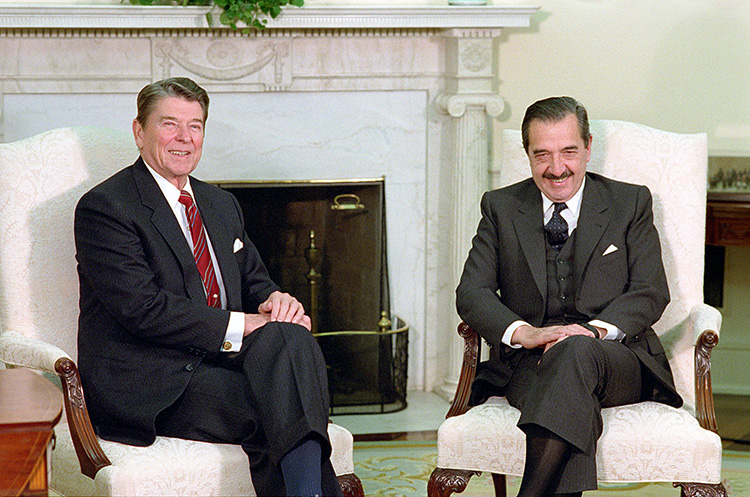

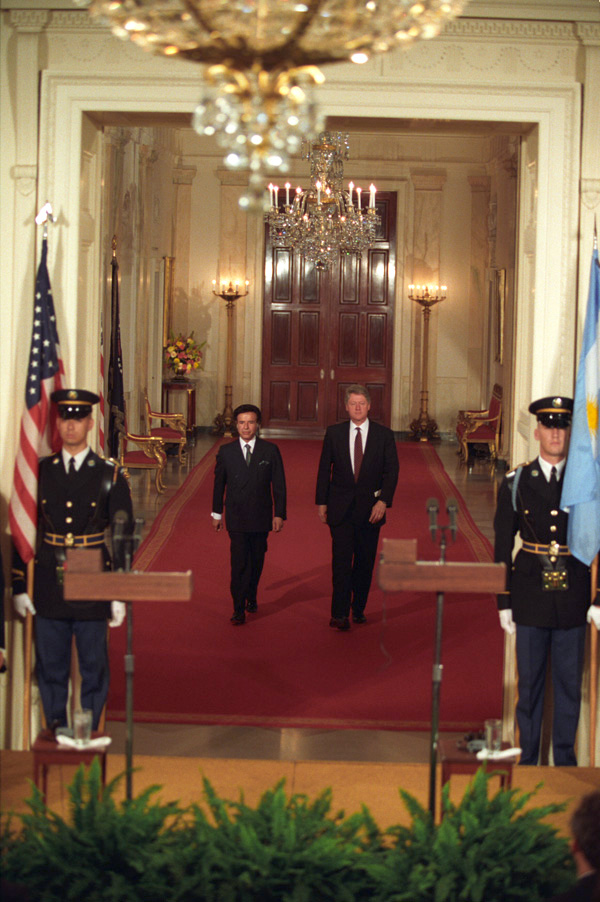

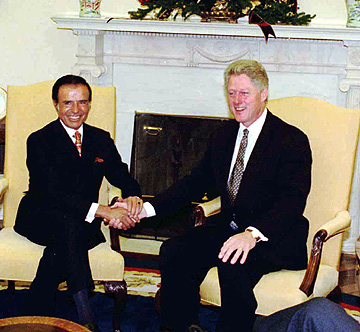

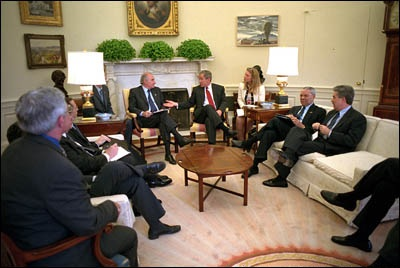

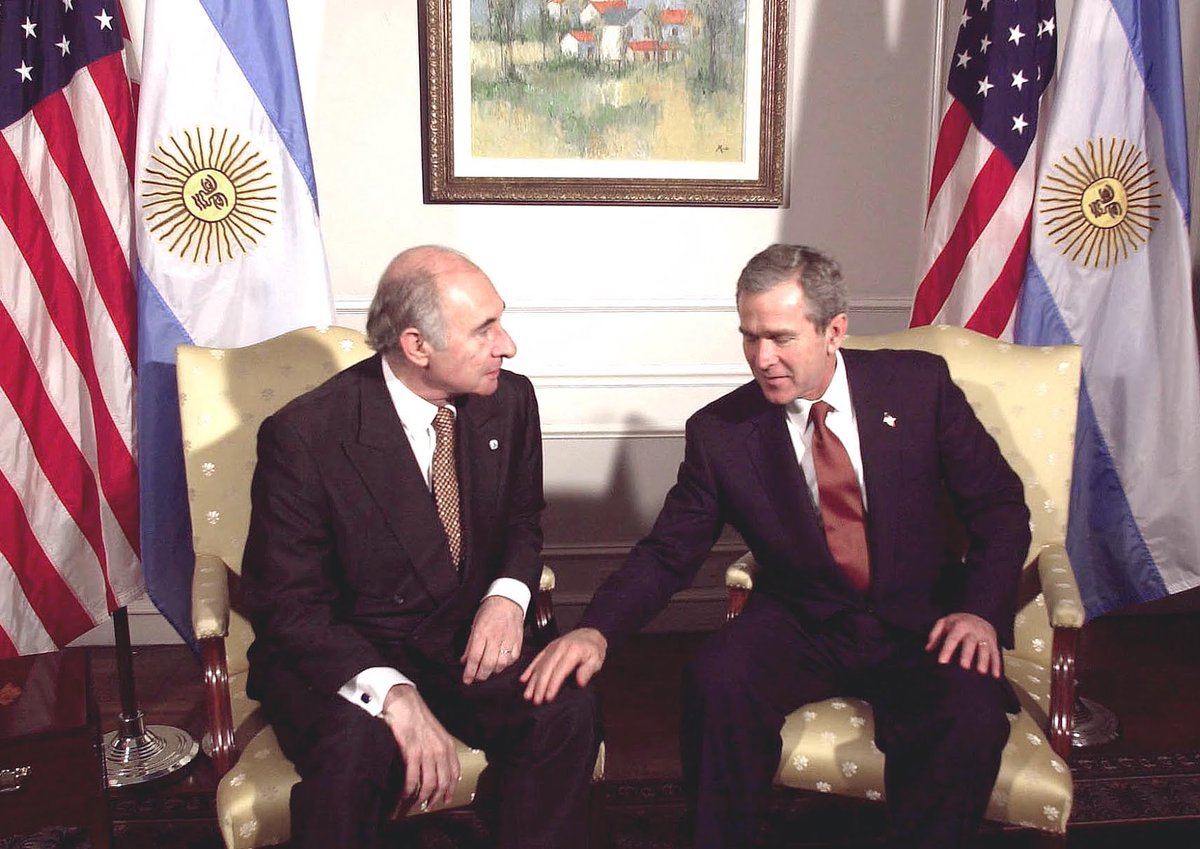

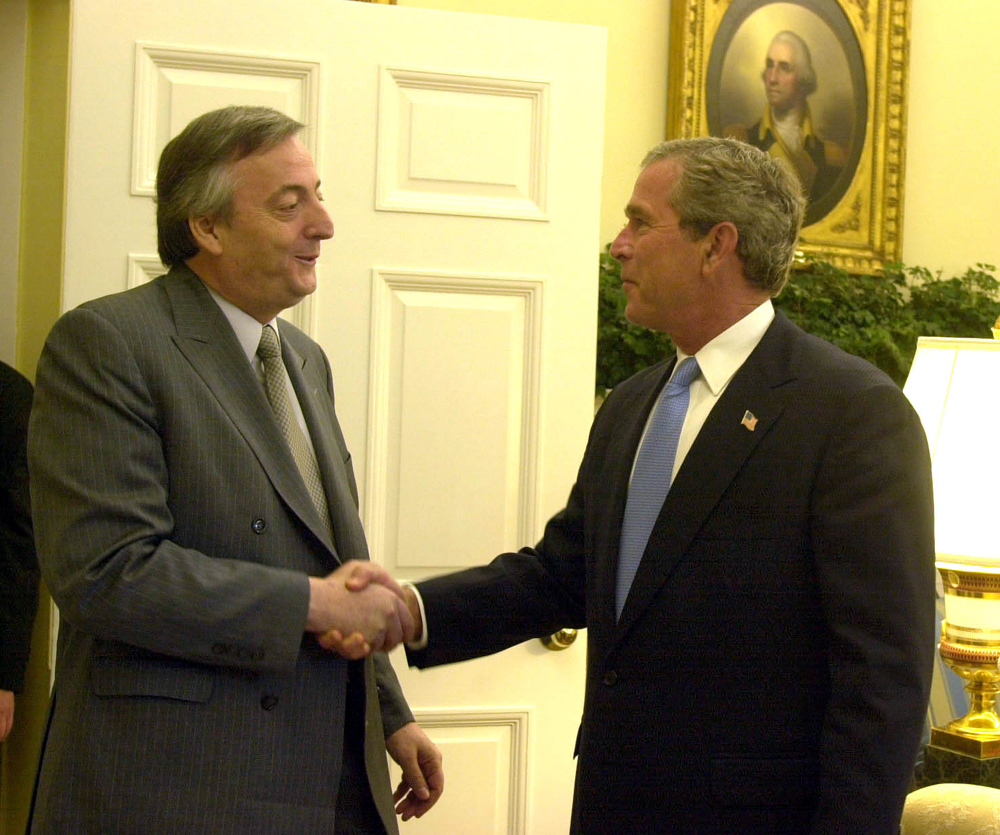

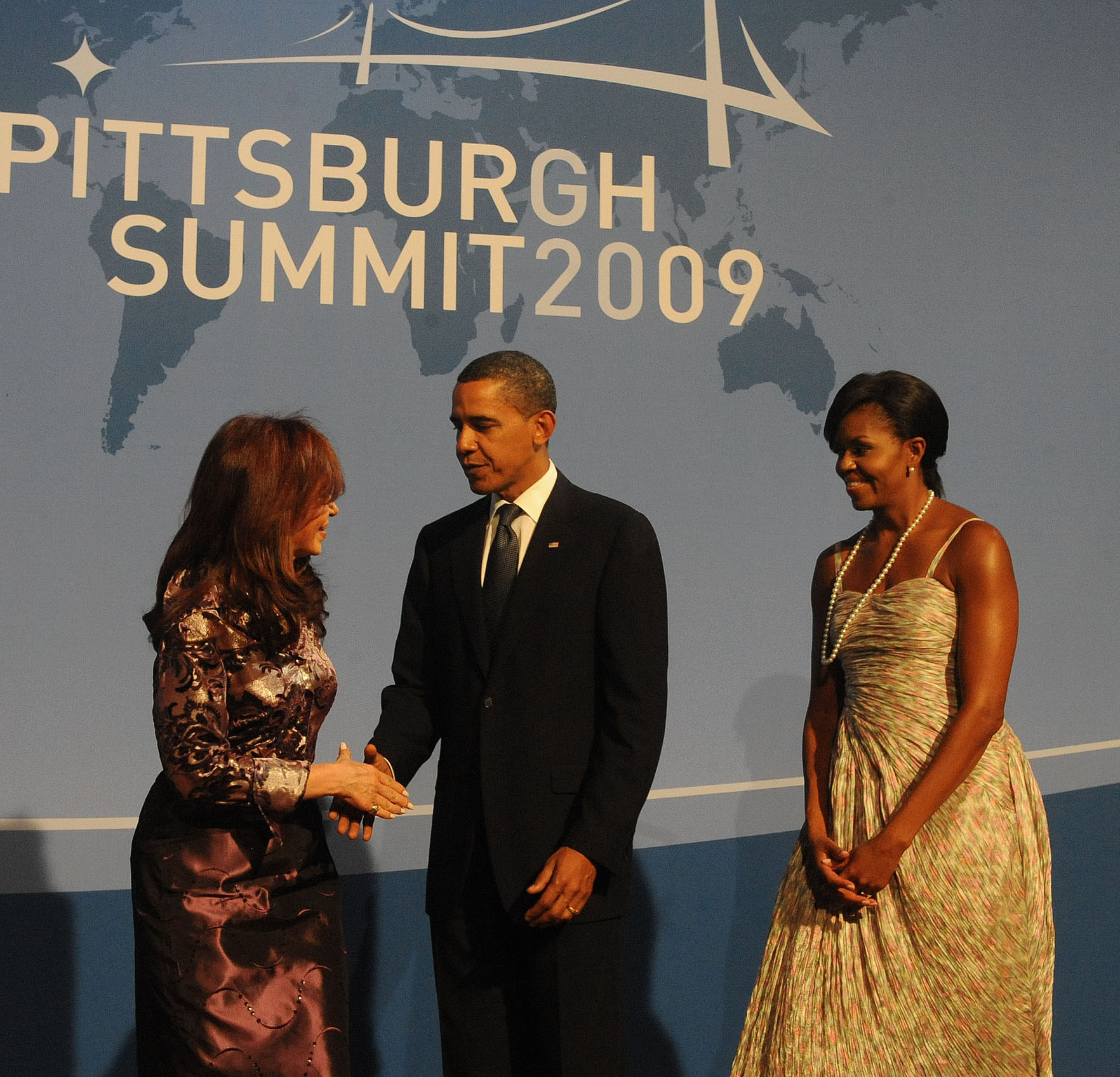

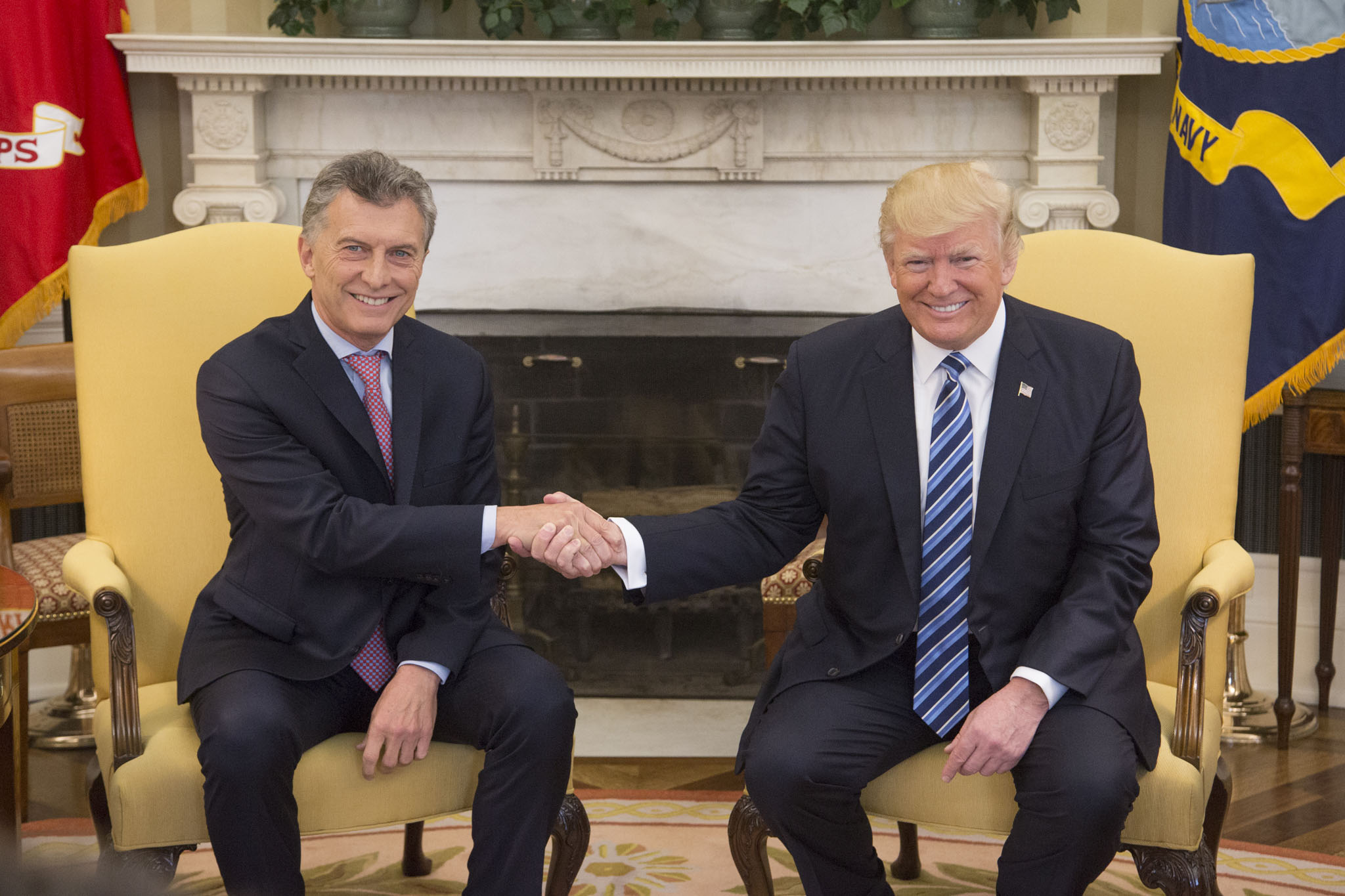

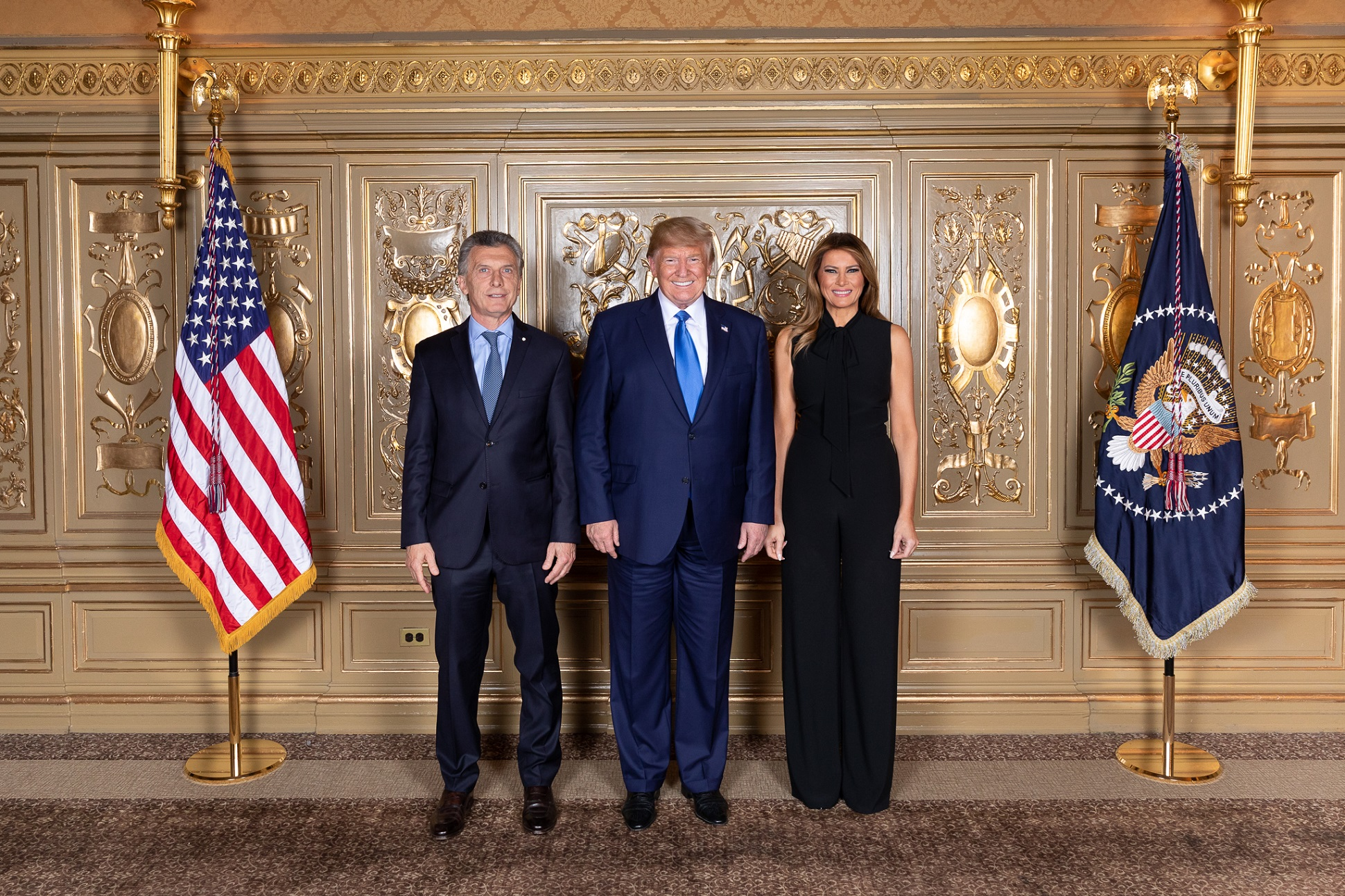

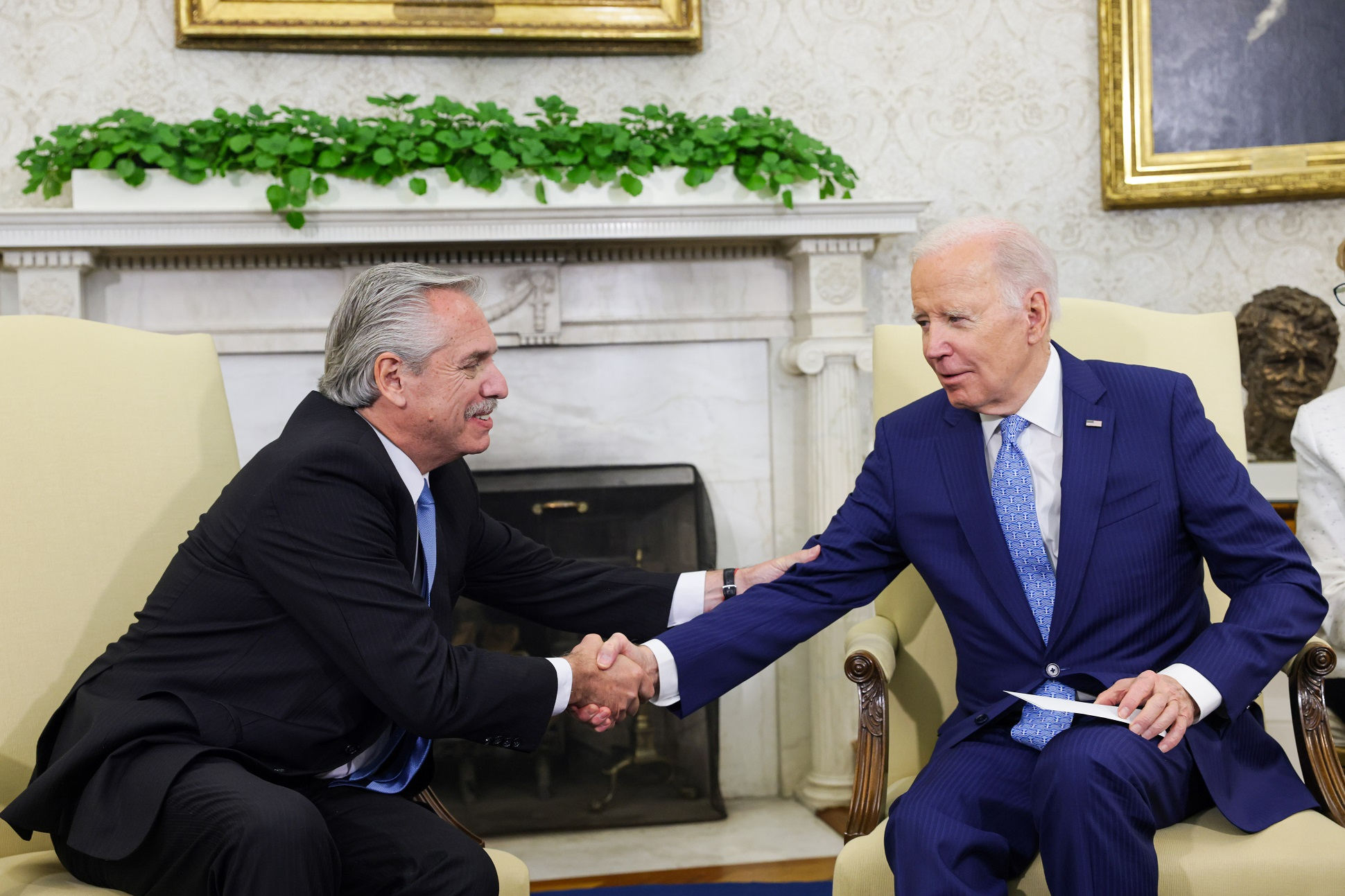

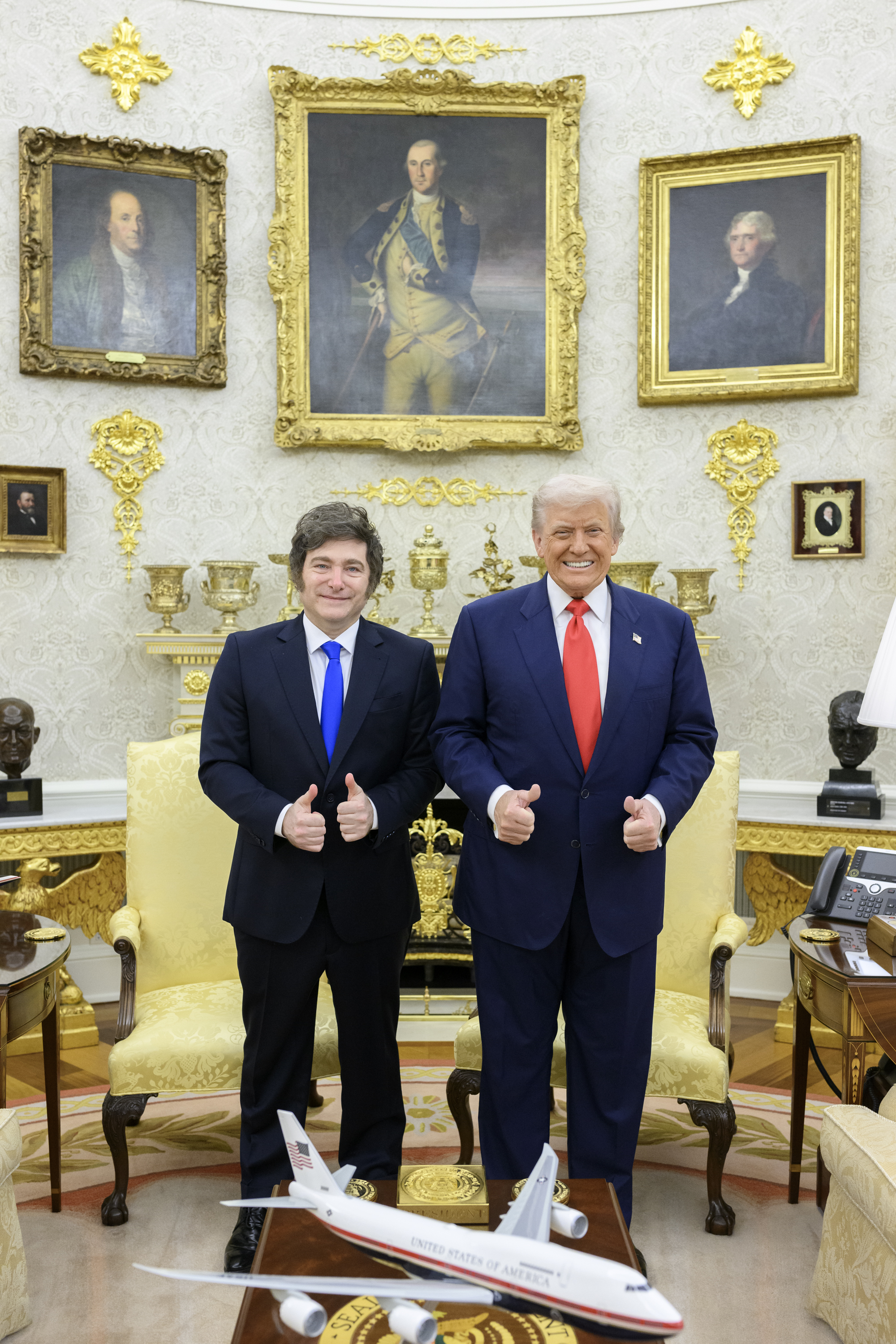

== Bolivia ==
Table of Trips
Start	End	Guest	Title	Reason
May 5, 1943	May 9, 1943	Enrique Peñaranda	President	Guest of the President. In U.S. May 4–21, visiting Detroit, Buffalo and West Point, and New York City.
October 22, 1963	October 24, 1963	Víctor Paz Estenssoro	President	State visit. In U.S. October 21–28, visited Williamsburg and New York City.
July 5, 1968	July 6, 1968	René Barrientos	President	Informal visit at LBJ Ranch, and Bolivia Day ceremonies in San Antonio
September 6, 1977	September 9, 1977	Hugo Banzer	President	Attended signing of the Panama Canal Treaty.
September 25, 1989	September 25, 1989	Jaime Paz Zamora	President	Met with President Bush at the U.N. General Assembly.
May 7, 1990	May 9, 1990	Jaime Paz Zamora	President	Official working visit. Private visit to Miami afterwards.
February 26, 1992	February 27, 1992	Jaime Paz Zamora	President	Attended Drug Summit in San Antonio
December 9, 1994	December 11, 1994	Gonzalo Sanchez de Lozada	President	Attended the Summit of the Americas in Miami
September 8, 2000	September 8, 2000	Hugo Banzer	President	Met with President Clinton at the UN Millennium Summit in New York City.
December 6, 2001	December 6, 2001	Jorge Quiroga	President	Working visit.
November 9, 2002	November 14, 2002	Gonzalo Sanchez de Lozada	President	Working visit.

== Brazil ==
Table of Trips
Start	End	Guest	Title	Reason
May 7, 1876	May 11, 1876	Pedro II	Emperor	Visited U.S. April 15 – July 12, covering over 9,000 miles. Second-ever state visit to the United States and the first of a country that did not later become part of the United States. Traveled from New York City to San Francisco, to New Orleans, and to Boston. Revisited Washington, D.C.June 2; attended the Centennial Exposition in Philadelphia June 20–25.
June 21, 1919	June 25, 1919	Epitácio Pessoa	President	In U.S. June 20–27; visited New York City.
June 11, 1930	June 15, 1930	Júlio Prestes	President	Officially returned President-elect Hoover's visit. In U.S. June 11–20, visiting New York City, West Point, and Philadelphia.
May 18, 1949	May 21, 1949	Eurico Gaspar Dutra	President	Official guest. Discussed economic cooperation. Addressed U.S. Congress May 19. Afterwards visited New York City and Chattanooga and Nashville. Departed U.S. May 27.
January 5, 1956	January 6, 1956	Juscelino Kubitschek	President	Met with President Eisenhower at Key West and with other officials in Washington, D.C. Afterwards visited New York City. Departed U.S. January 9.
April 3, 1962	April 5, 1962	João Goulart	President	Official visit. Afterwards visited New York City, Omaha and Chicago. Departed U.S. April 8.
January 25, 1967	January 28, 1967	Artur da Costa e Silva	President	Informal visit. In U.S. January 18–31; visited Honolulu, Los Angeles, Cape Kennedy, and New York City
December 6, 1971	December 9, 1971	Emílio Garrastazu Médici	President	State visit.
May 11, 1982	May 13, 1982	João Figueiredo	President	State visit. Private visit afterwards to Cleveland.
January 31, 1985	February 3, 1985	Tancredo Neves	President	Private visit. Met with President Reagan February 1.
September 9, 1986	September 11, 1986	José Sarney	President	State Visit; visited New York City (September 12–13). Addressed Joint Meeting of U.S. Congress September 11.
September 25, 1989	September 25, 1989	José Sarney	President	Met with President Bush at the U.N. General Assembly.
January 26, 1990	January 26, 1990	Fernando Collor de Mello	President	Private visit.
September 30, 1990	September 30, 1990	Fernando Collor de Mello	President	Met with President Bush at the U.N. General Assembly.
July 17, 1991	July 20, 1991	Fernando Collor de Mello	President	State Visit. Afterwards visited New York City.
September 23, 1991	September 23, 1991	Fernando Collor de Mello	President	Met with President Bush at the U.N. General Assembly.
December 9, 1994	December 9, 1994	Itamar Franco	President	Attended the Summit of the Americas in Miami
April 19, 1995	April 22, 1995	Fernando Henrique Cardoso	President	State Visit.
July 6, 1998	July 8, 1998	Fernando Henrique Cardoso	President	Met with President Clinton during a private visit.
May 8, 1999	May 10, 1999	Fernando Henrique Cardoso	President	Private visit.
March 29, 2001	April 1, 2001	Fernando Henrique Cardoso	President	Working visit.
November 8, 2001	November 8, 2001	Fernando Henrique Cardoso	President	Met with President Bush during a private visit.
December 9, 2002	December 10, 2002	Luiz Inácio Lula da Silva	President	Working visit.
July 19, 2003	July 20, 2003	Luiz Inácio Lula da Silva	President	Working visit.
March 30, 2006	March 31, 2006	Luiz Inácio Lula da Silva	President	Working visit. Met with President Bush at Camp David.
September 24, 2007	September 24, 2007	Luiz Inácio Lula da Silva	President	Met with President Bush at the UN General Assembly in New York City.
November 14, 2008	November 15, 2008	Luiz Inácio Lula da Silva	President	Attended the G-20 Economic Summit meeting.
March 14, 2009	March 14, 2009	Luiz Inácio Lula da Silva	President	Working visit.
September 24, 2009	September 25, 2009	Luiz Inácio Lula da Silva	President	Attended the G-20 Economic Summit in Pittsburgh
April 12, 2010	April 13, 2010	Luiz Inácio Lula da Silva	President	Attended the Nuclear Security Summit.
September 20, 2011	September 20, 2011	Dilma Rousseff	President	Met with President Obama at the UN General Assembly in New York City.
April 9, 2012	April 9, 2012	Dilma Rousseff	President	Working visit.
June 29, 2015	June 30, 2015	Dilma Rousseff	President	Official Working visit.
March 17, 2019	March 19, 2019	Jair Bolsonaro	President	Official Working visit.
February 10, 2023	February 10, 2023	Luiz Inácio Lula da Silva	President	Official Working visit.
September 20, 2023	September 20, 2023	Luiz Inácio Lula da Silva	President	Met with President Biden at the UN General Assembly Meeting in New York City.
May 7, 2026	May 7, 2026	Luiz Inácio Lula da Silva	President	Working visit.

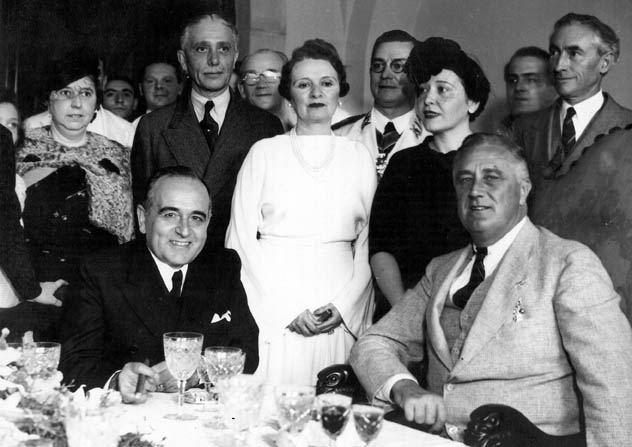

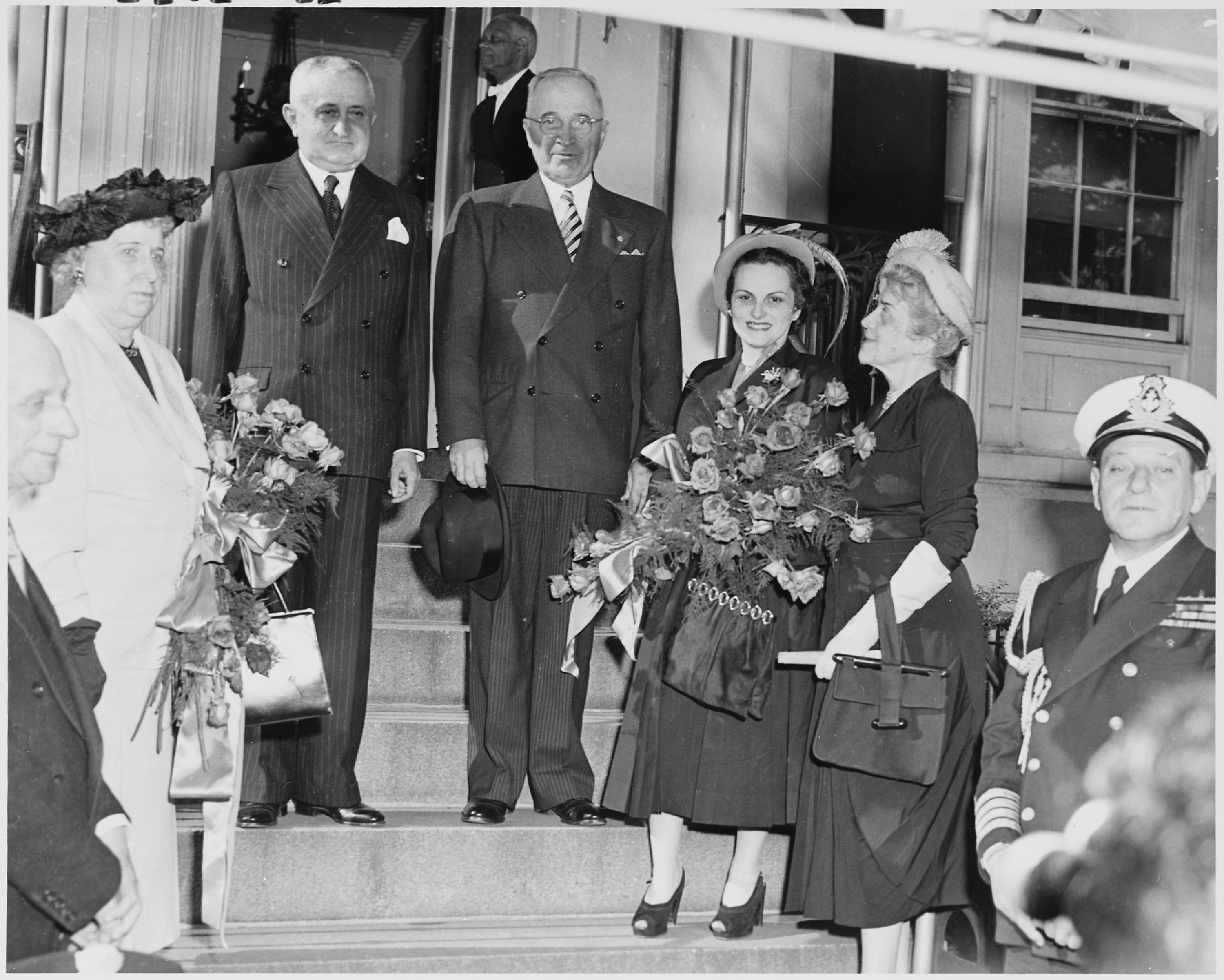

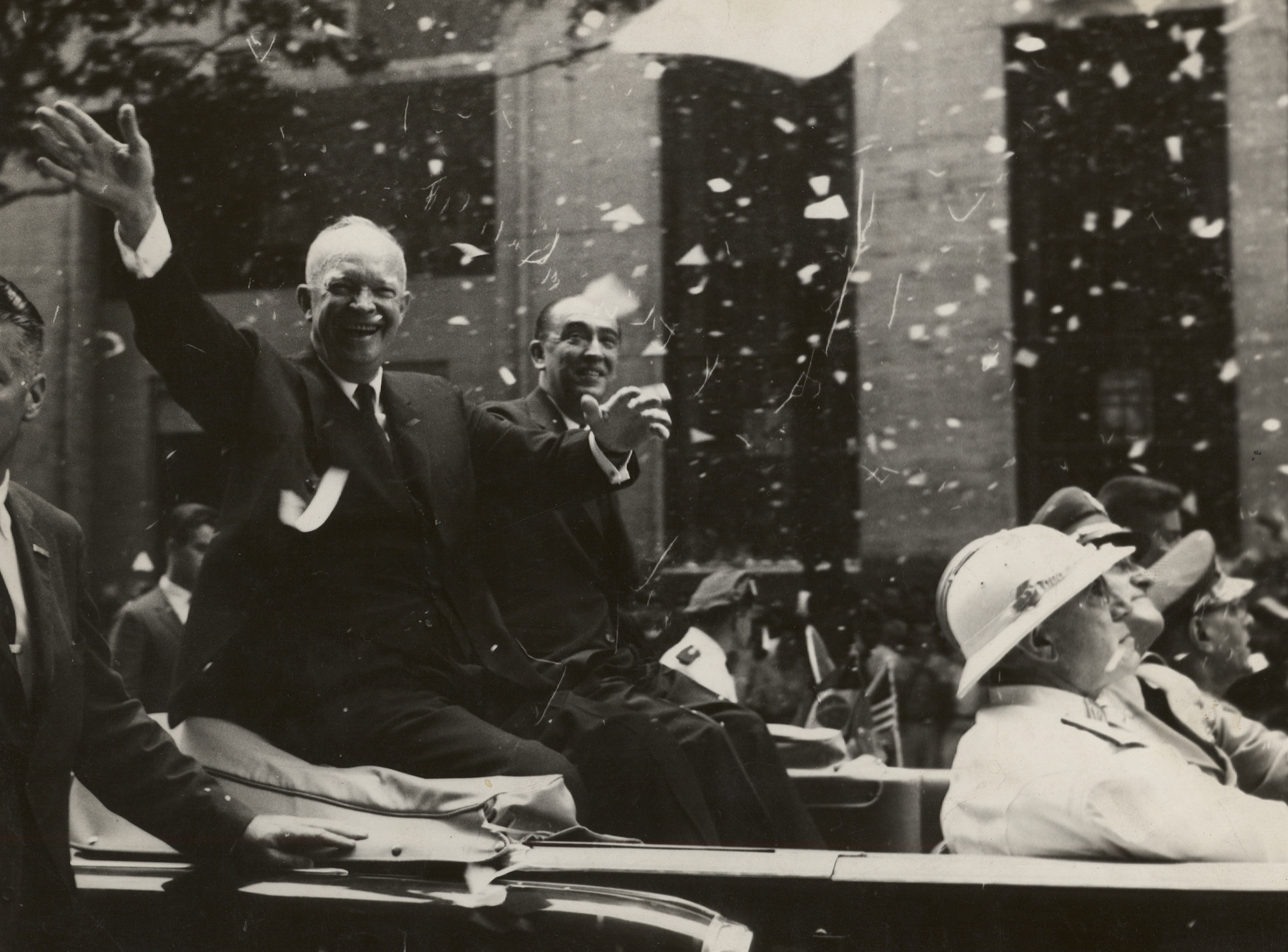

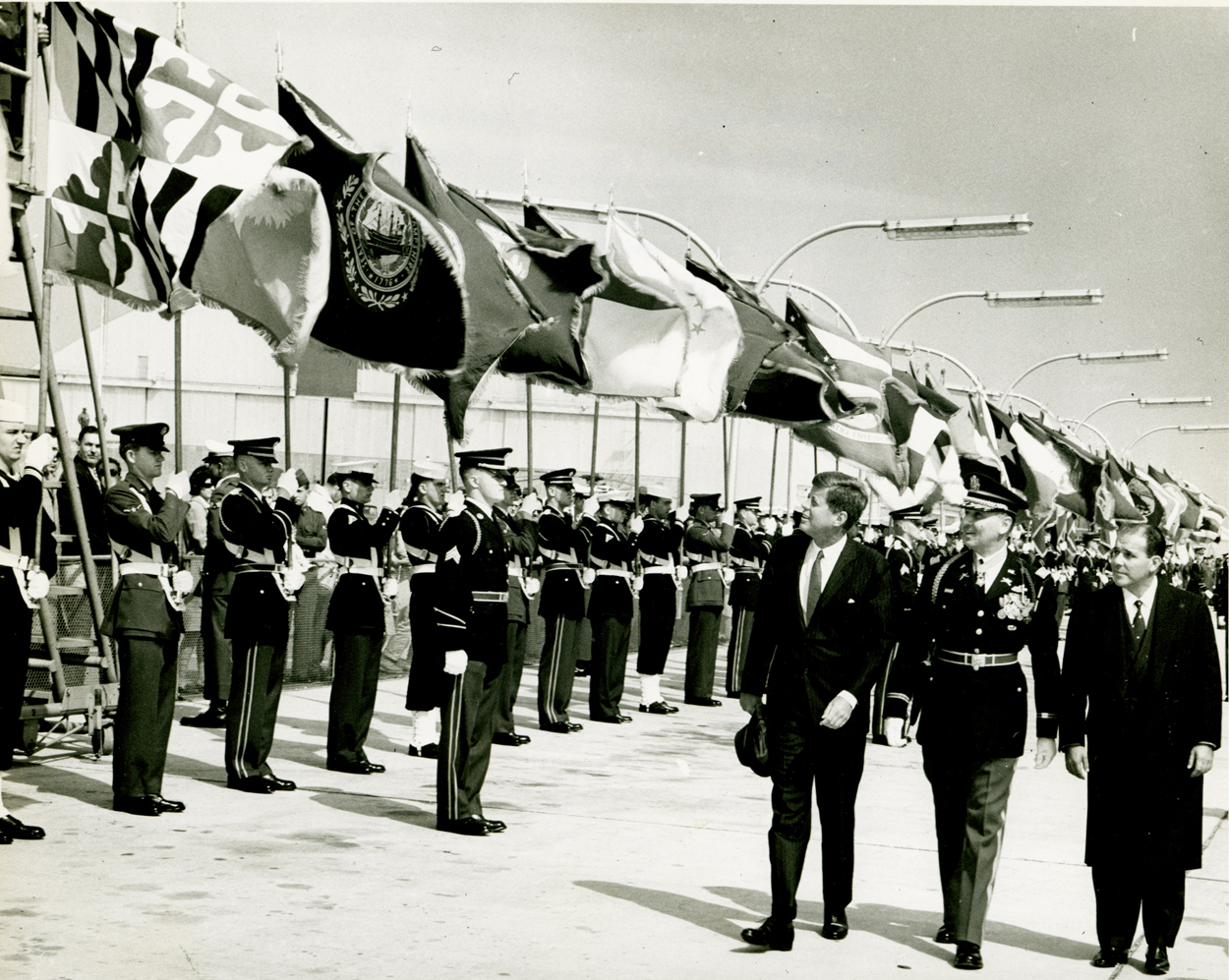

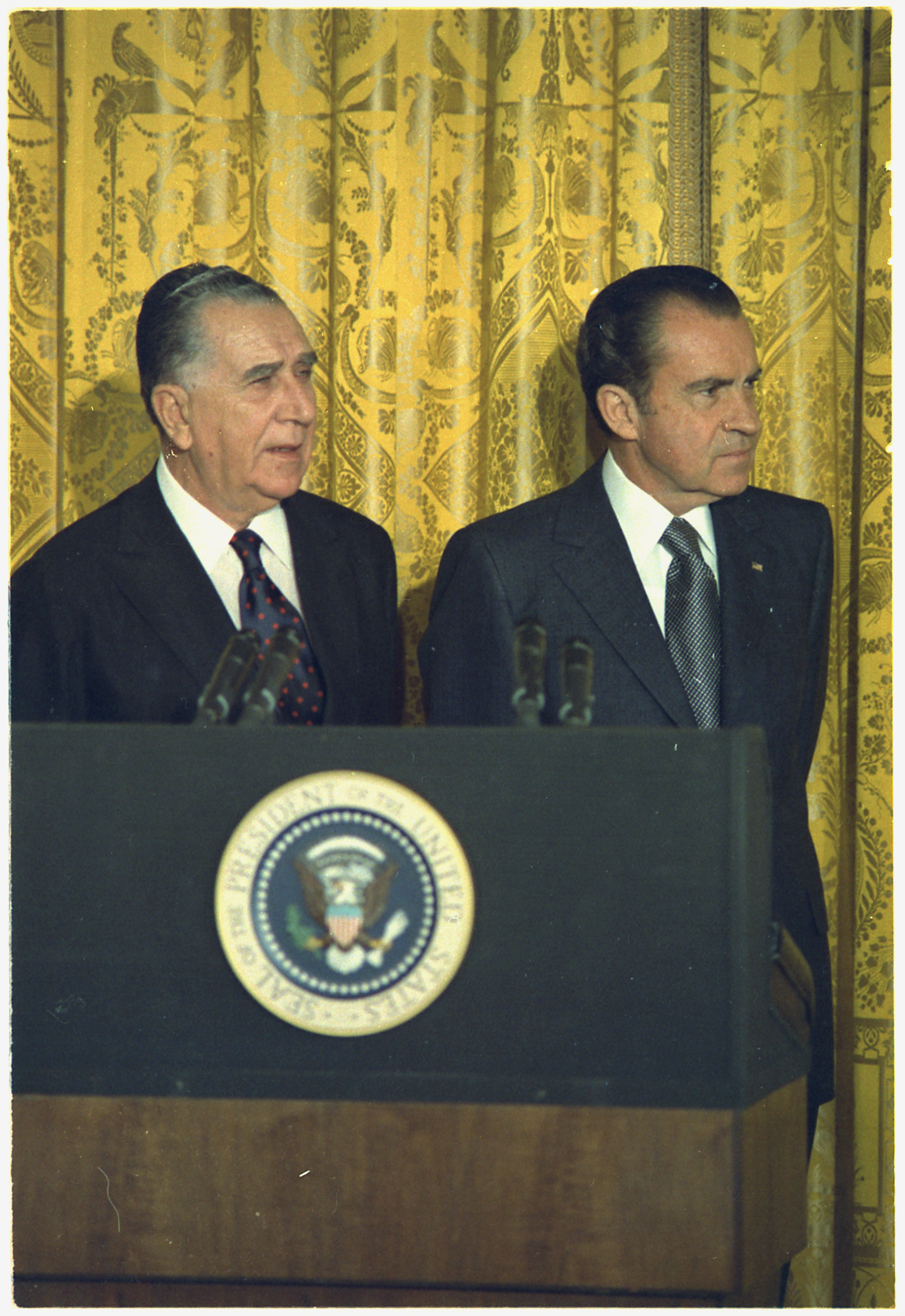

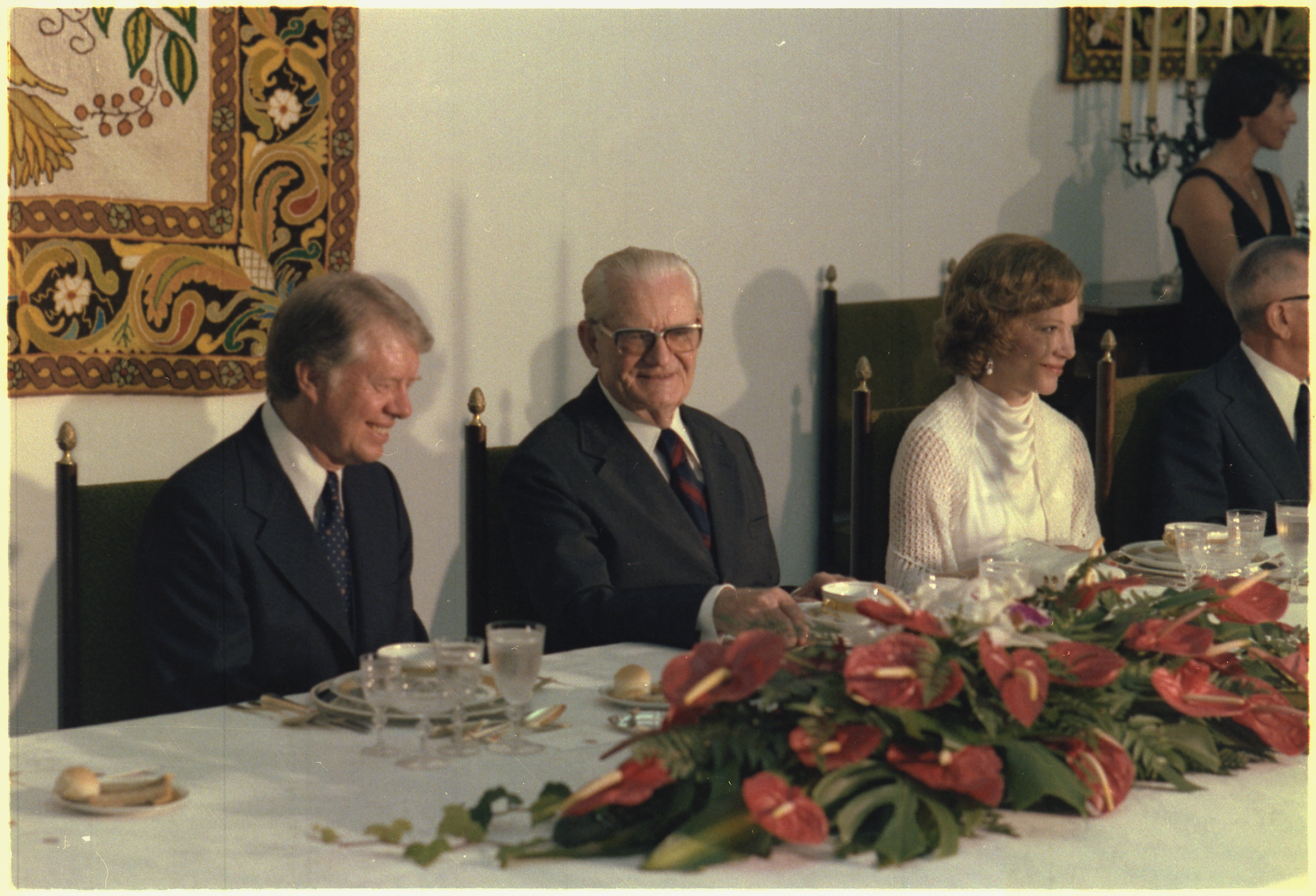

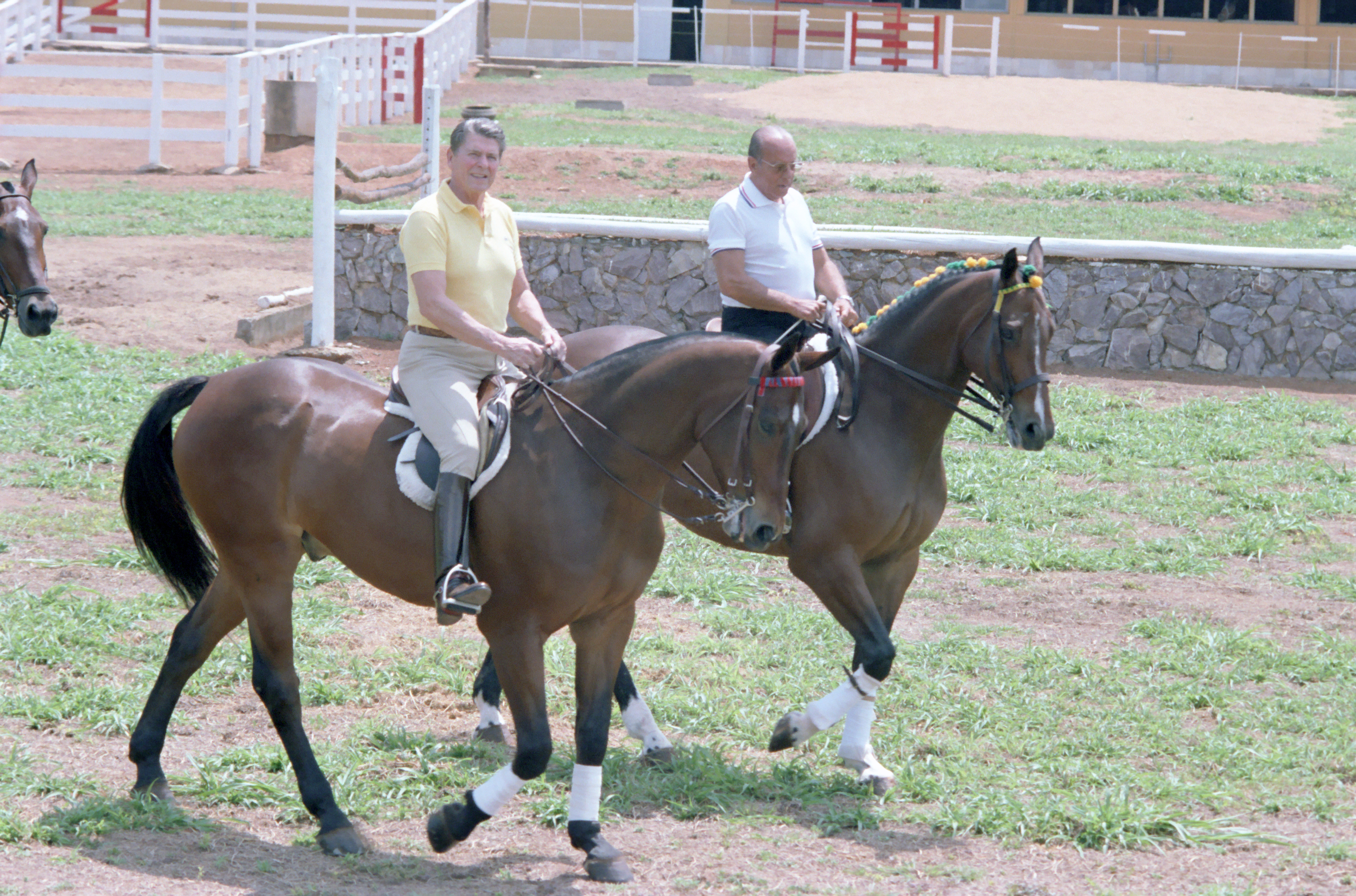

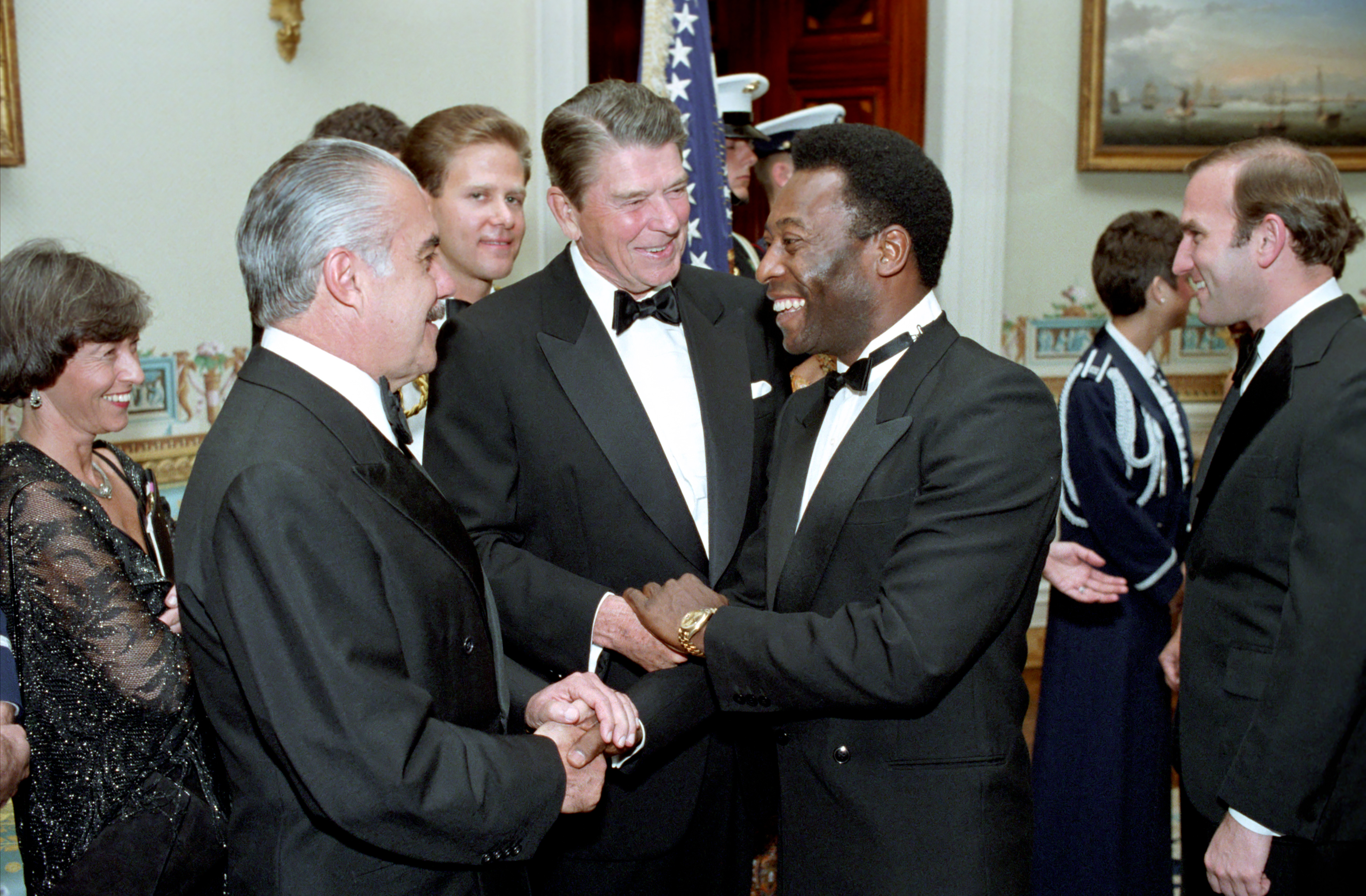

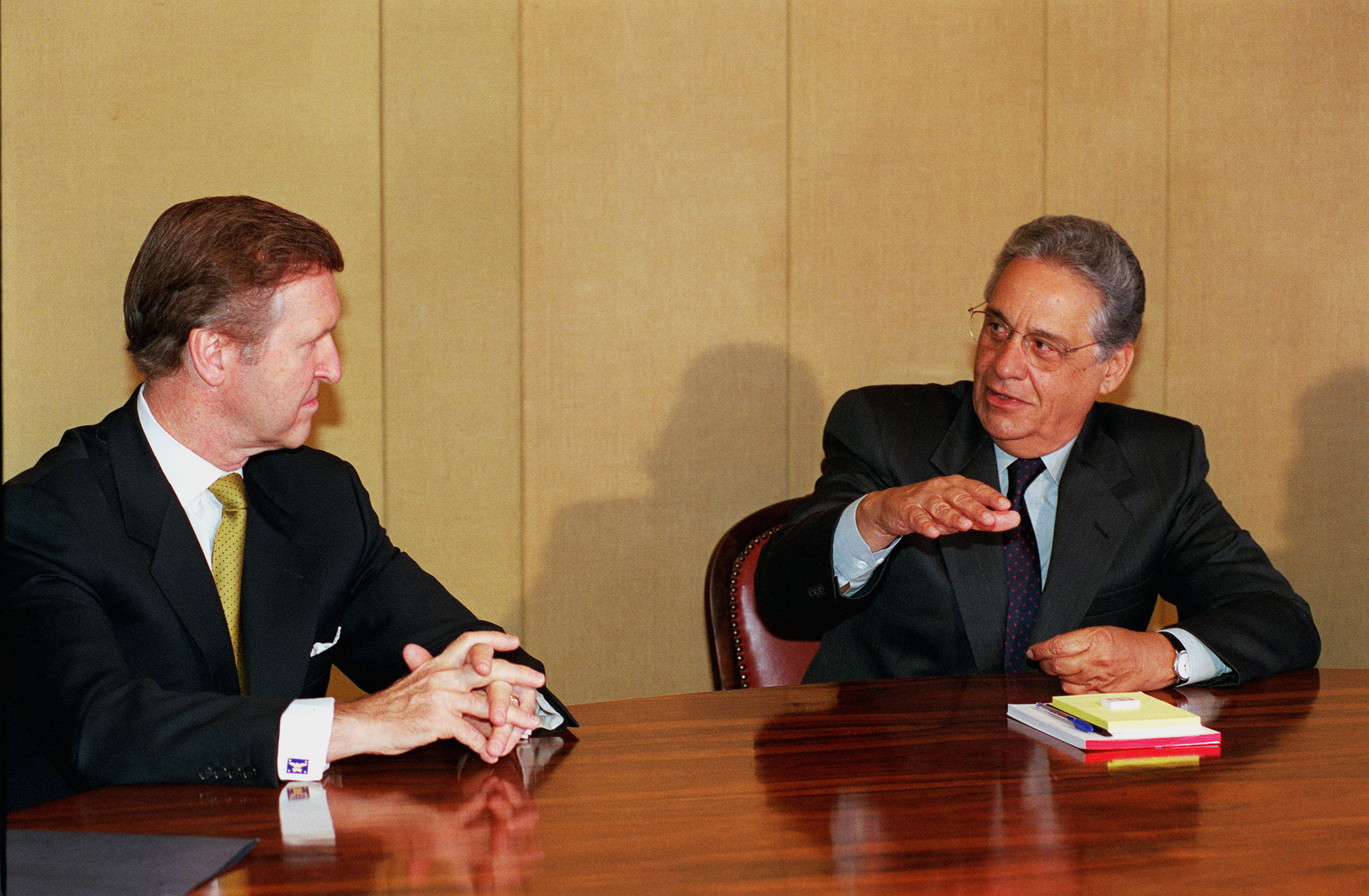

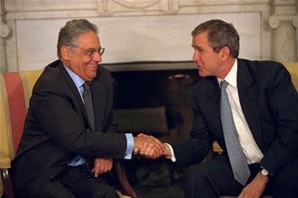

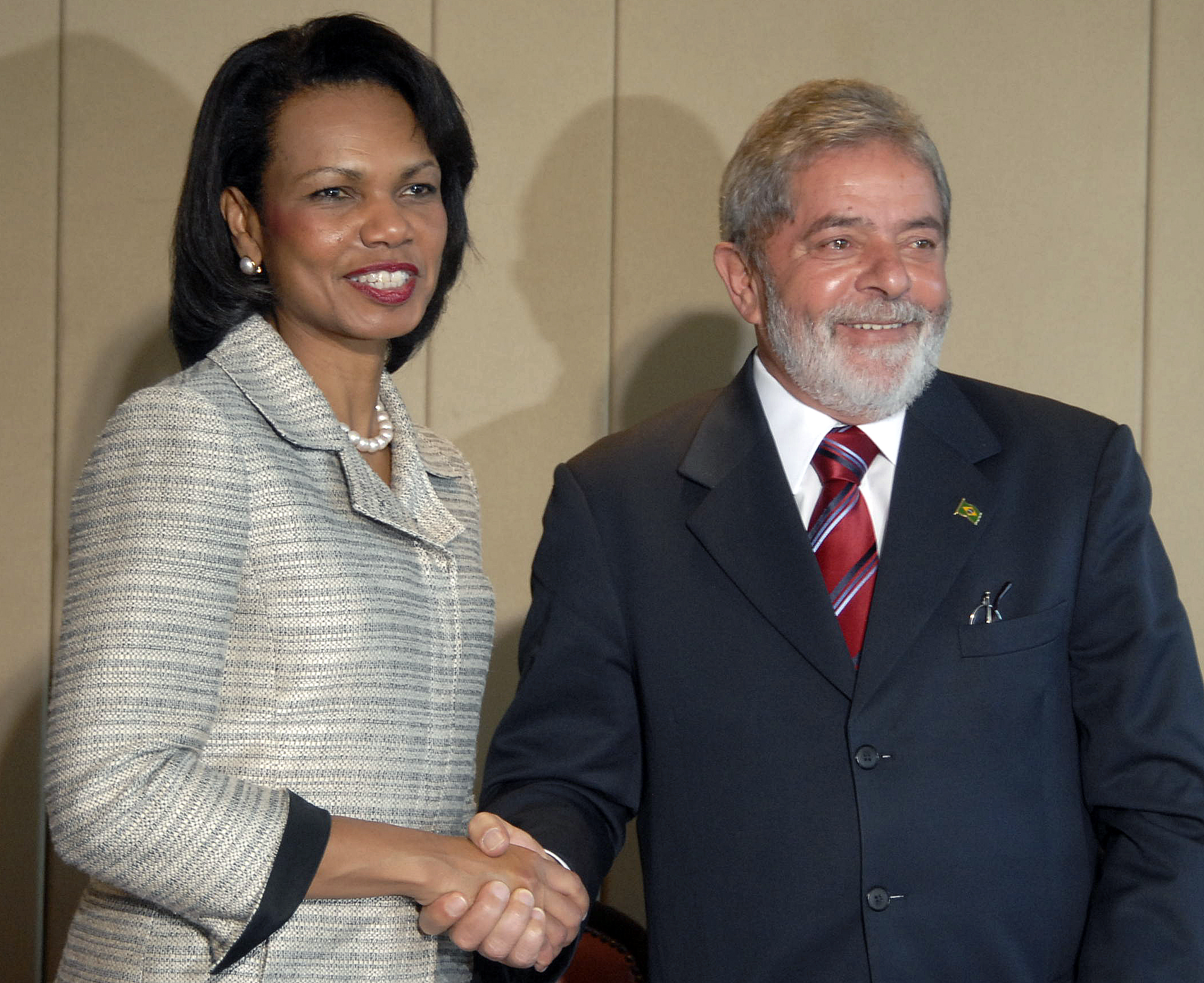

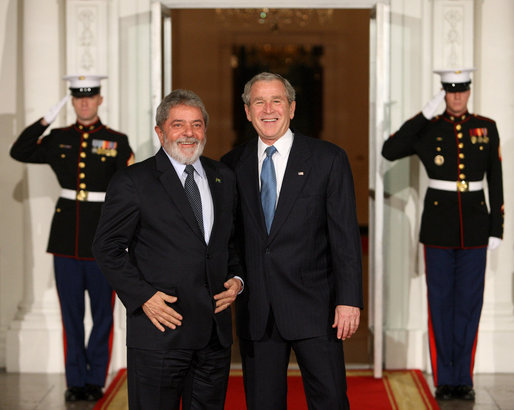

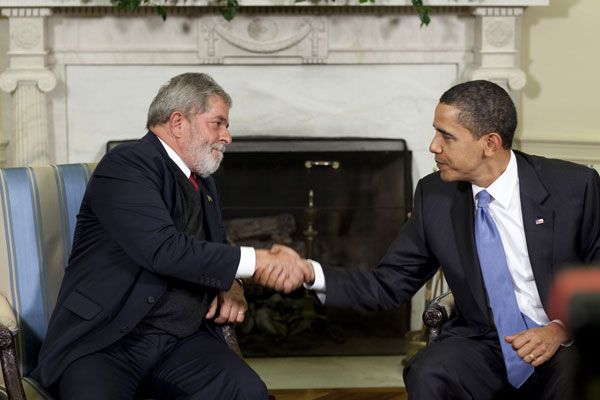

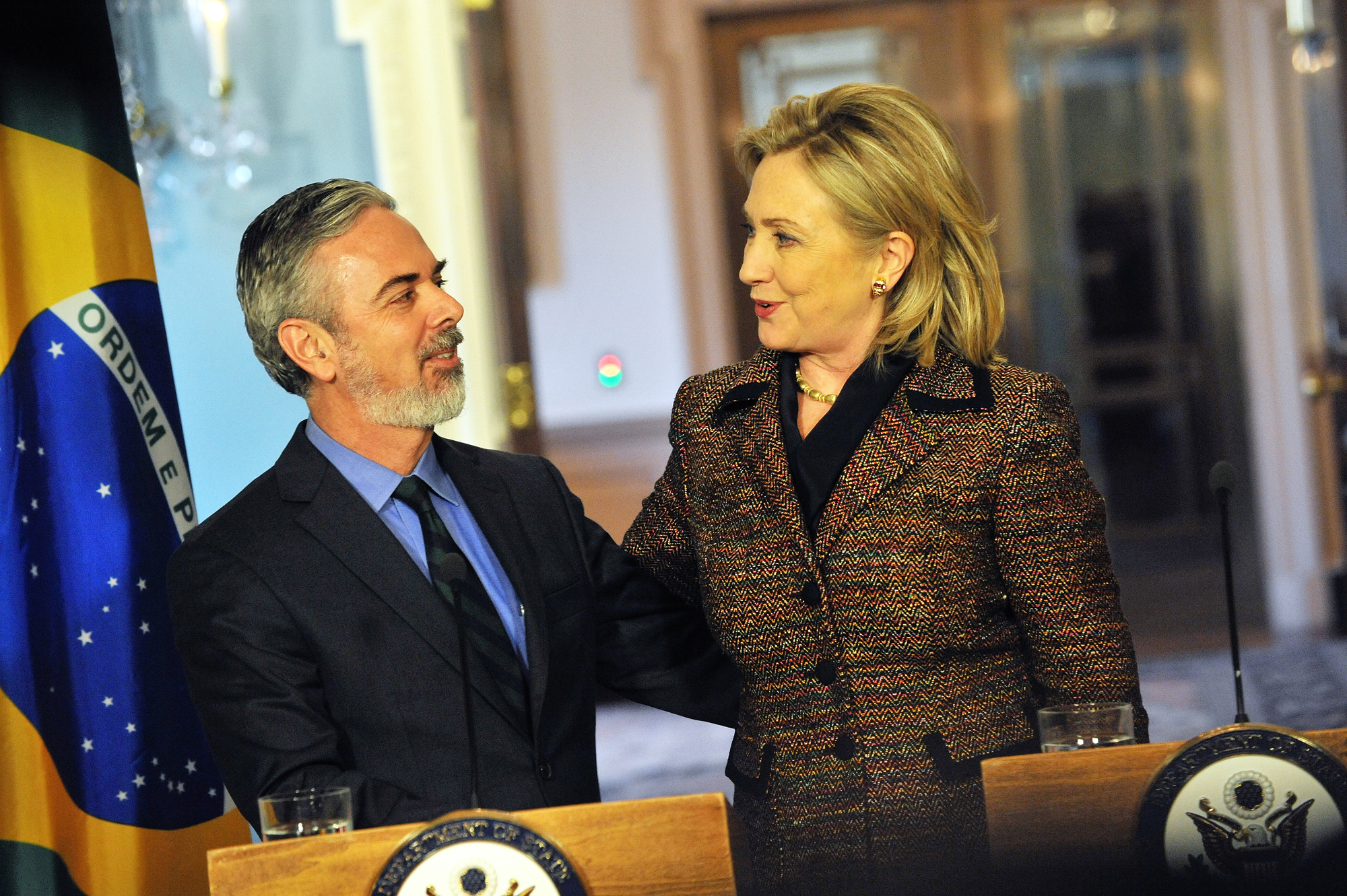

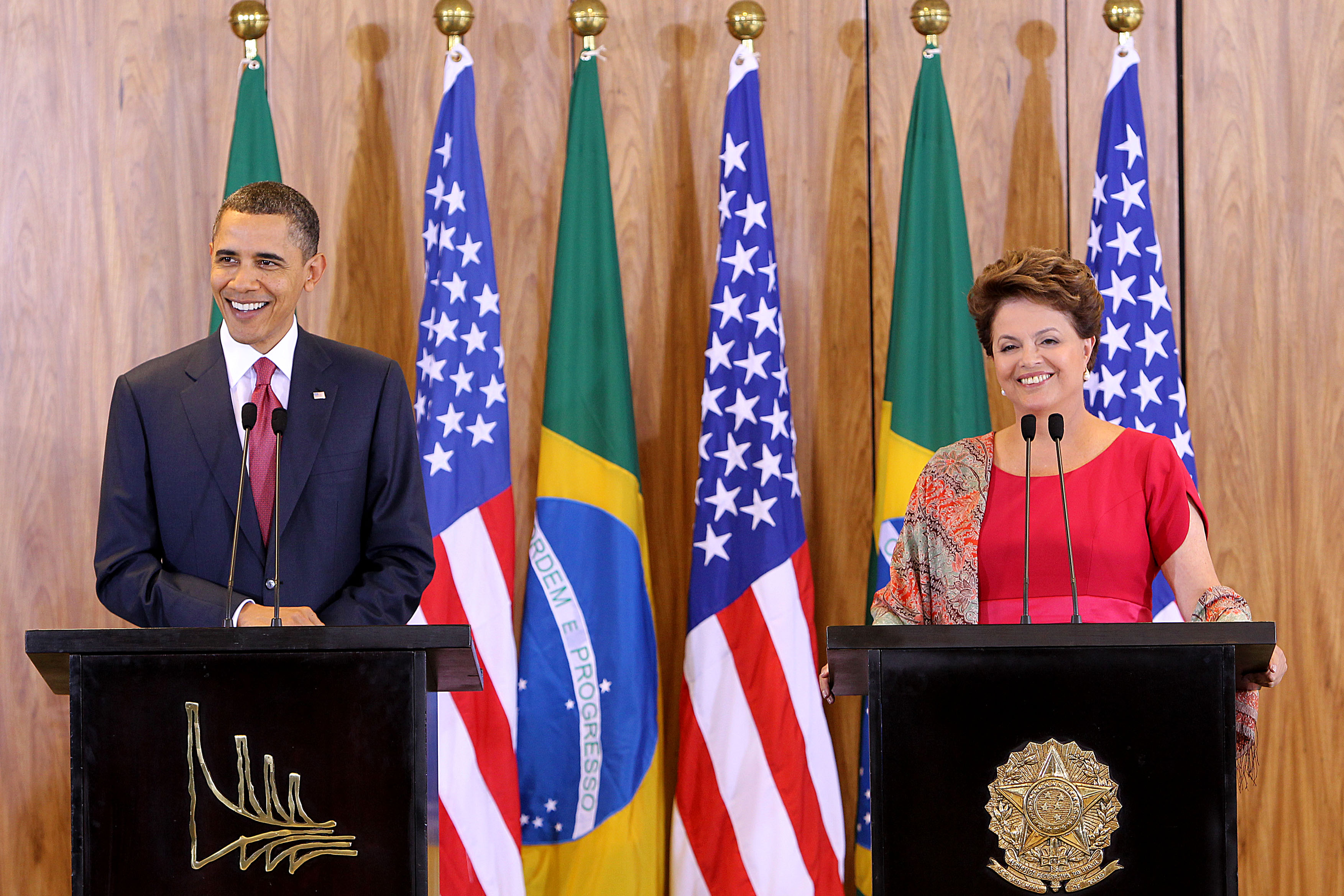

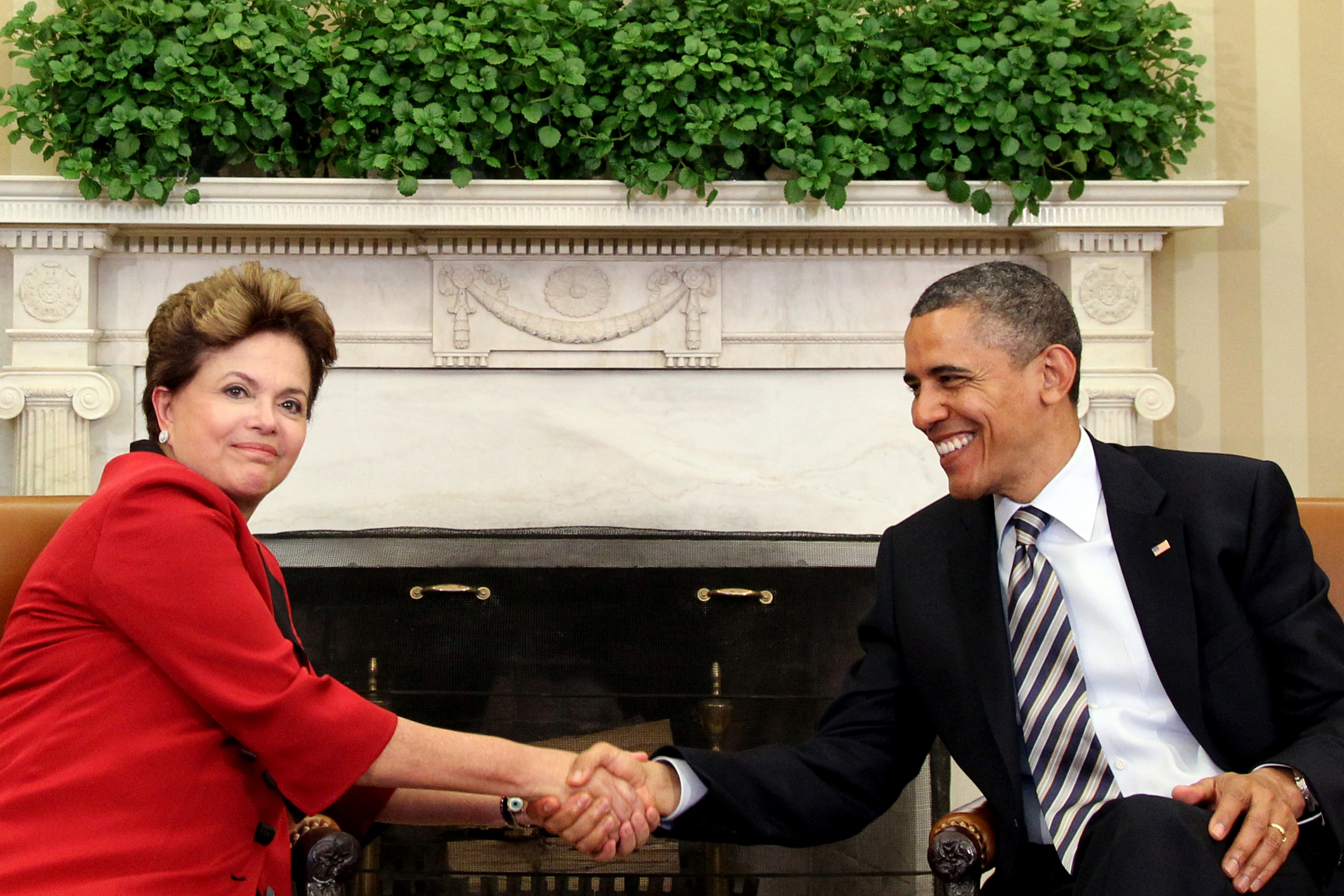

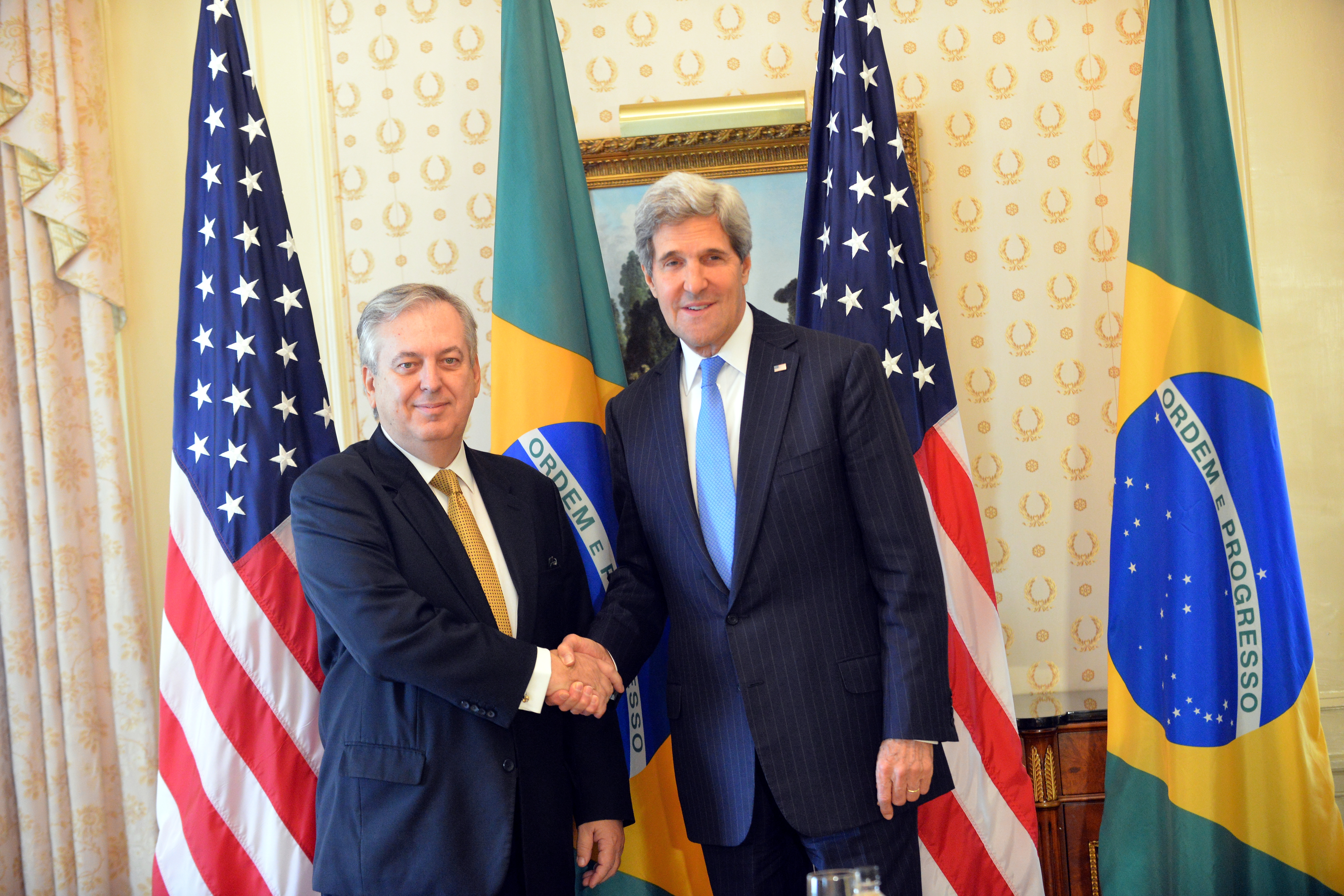

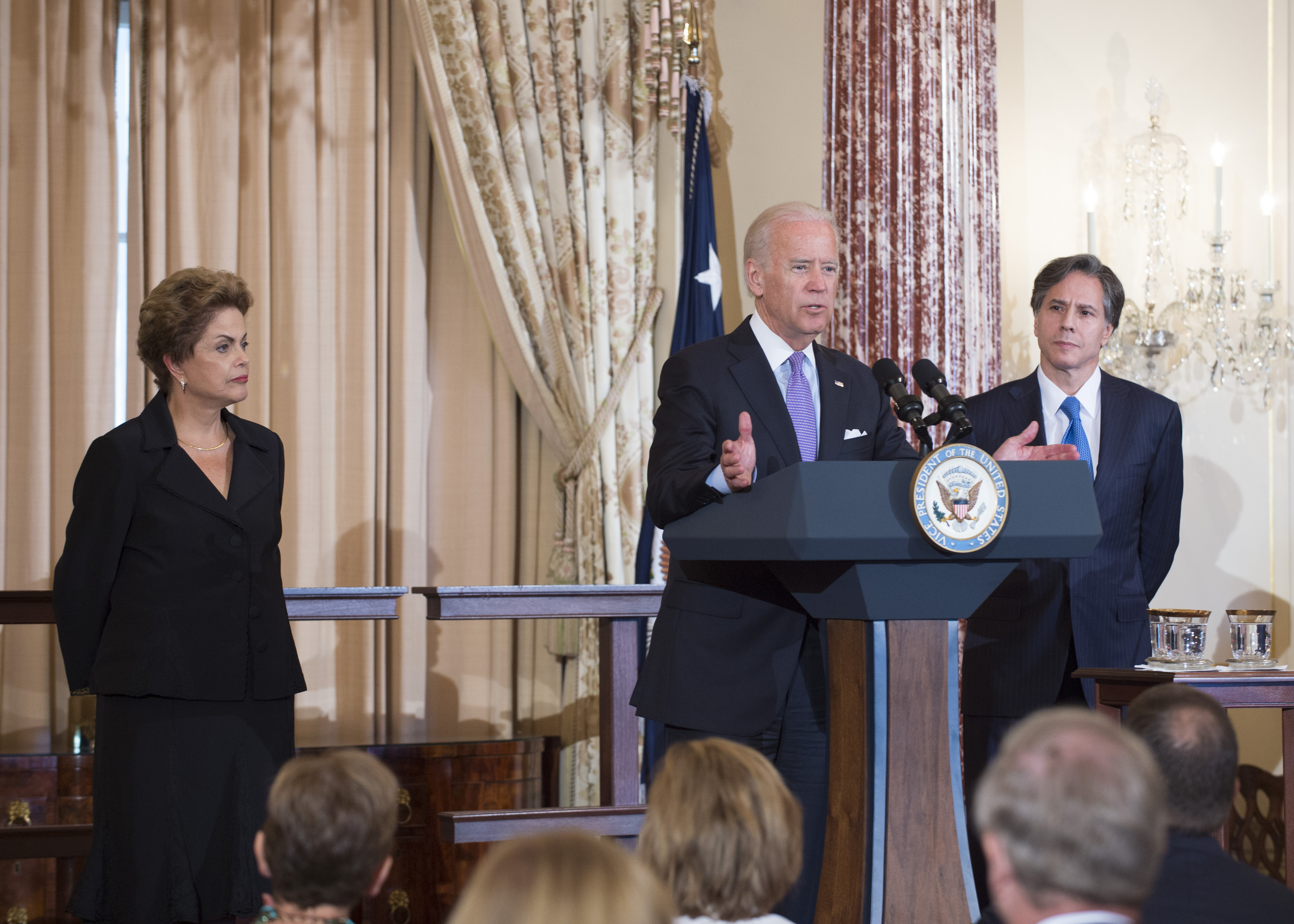

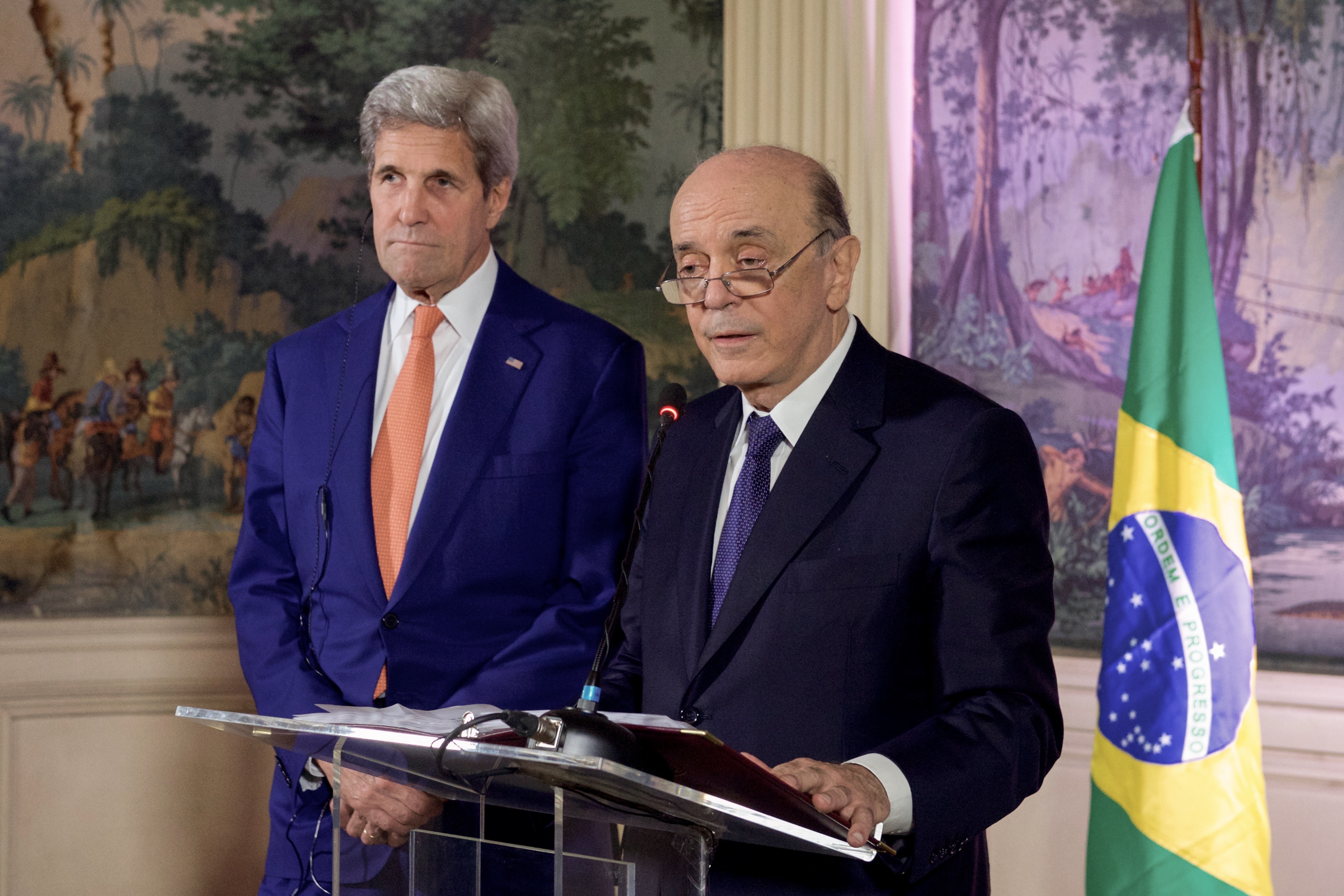

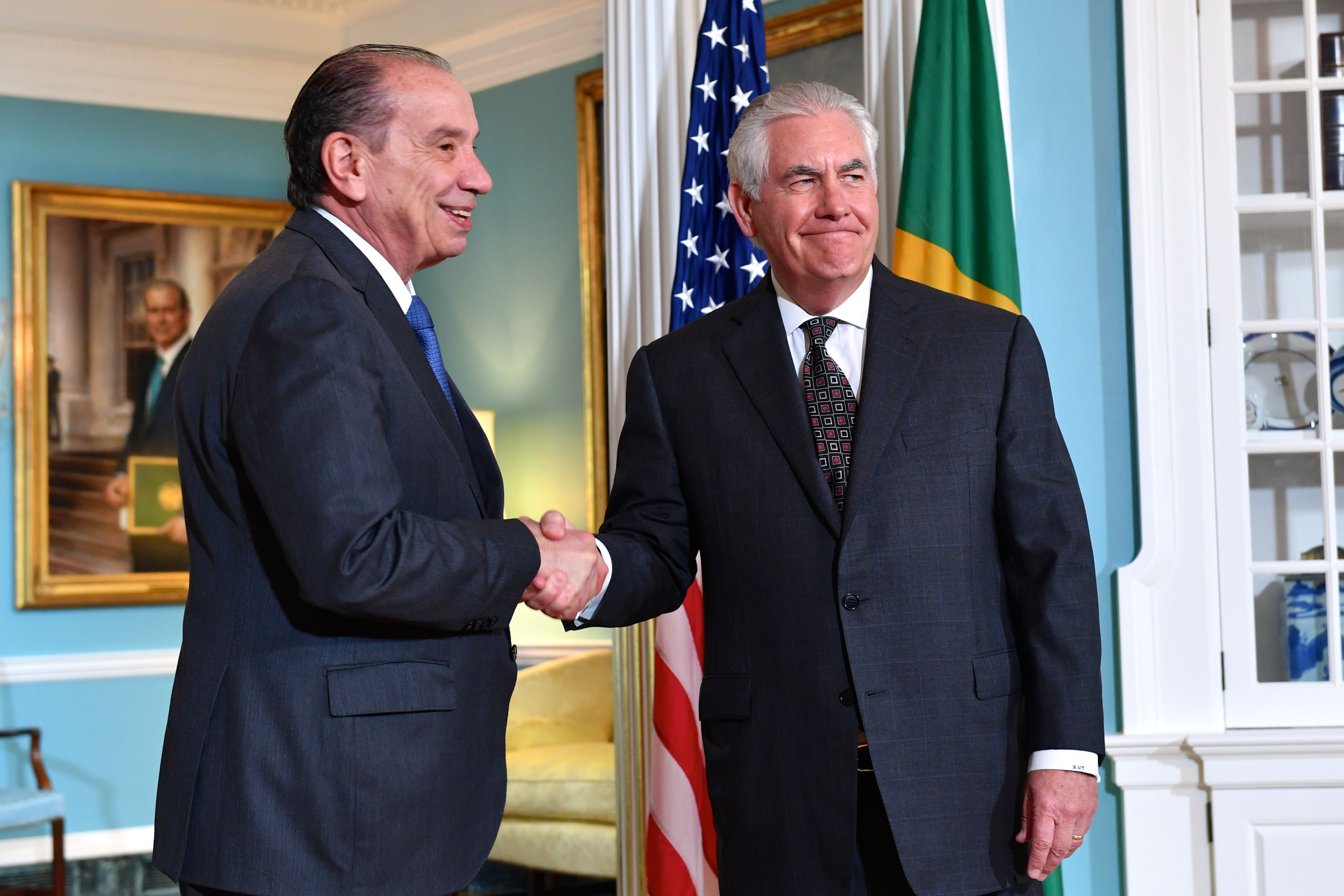

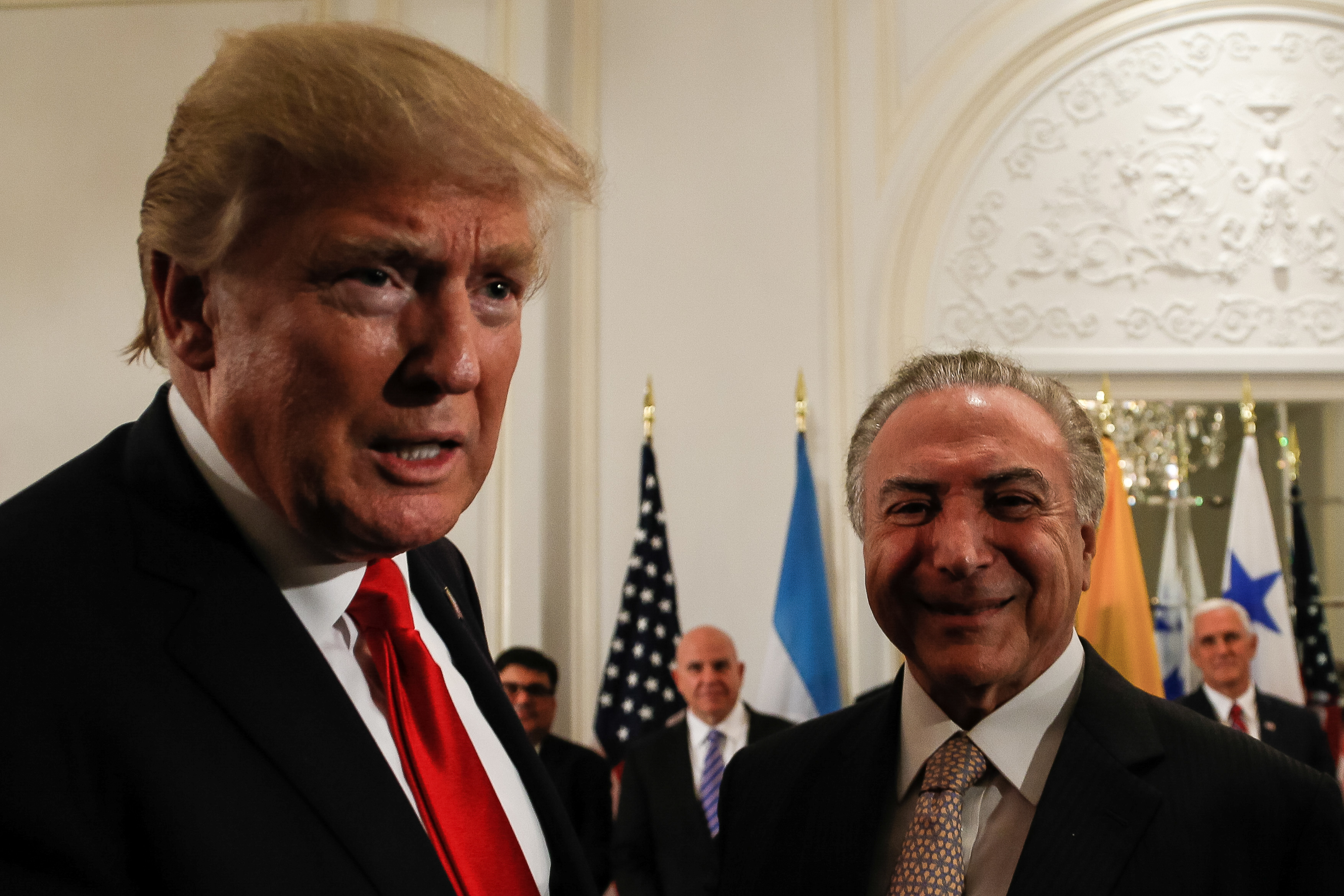

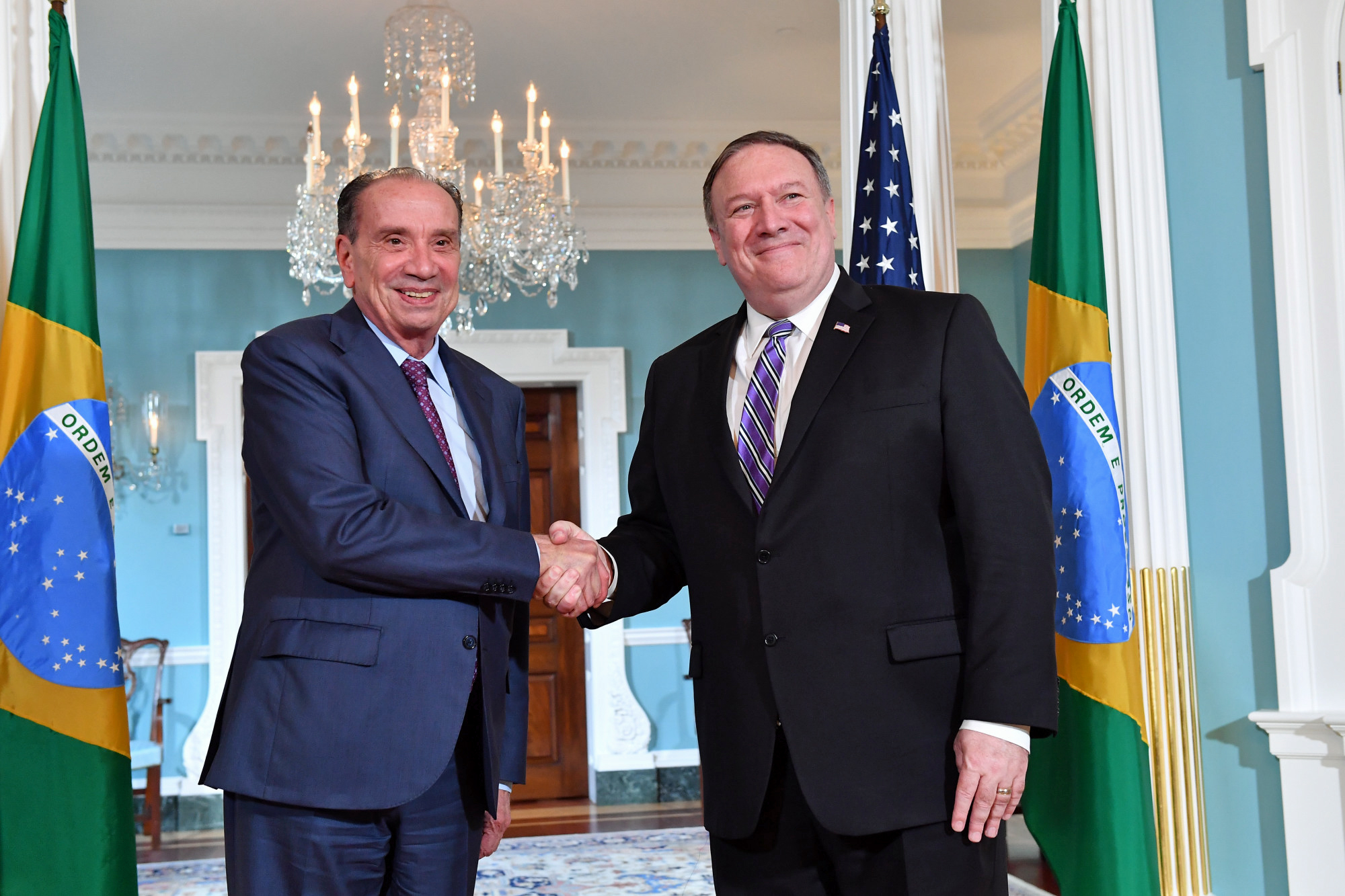

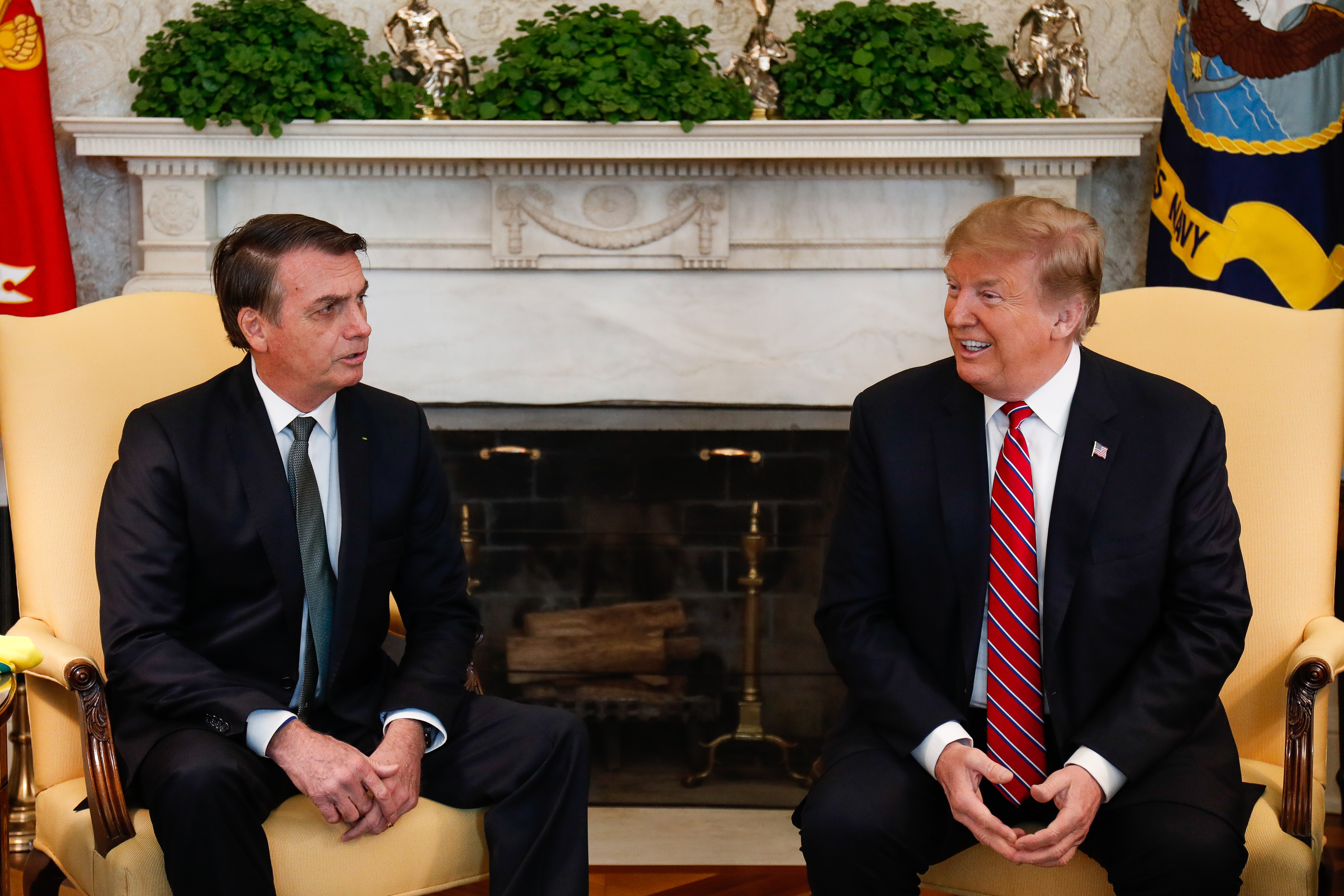

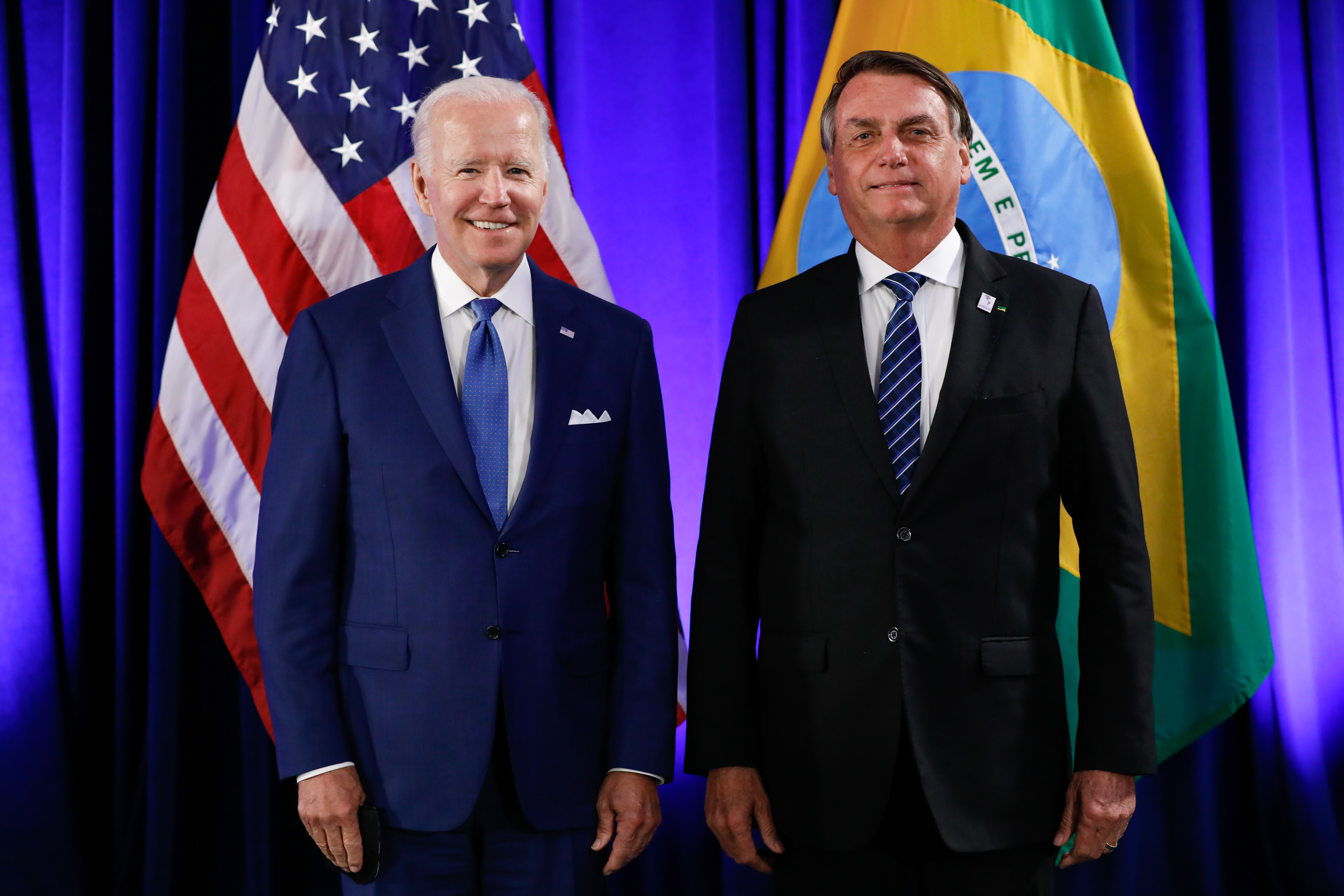

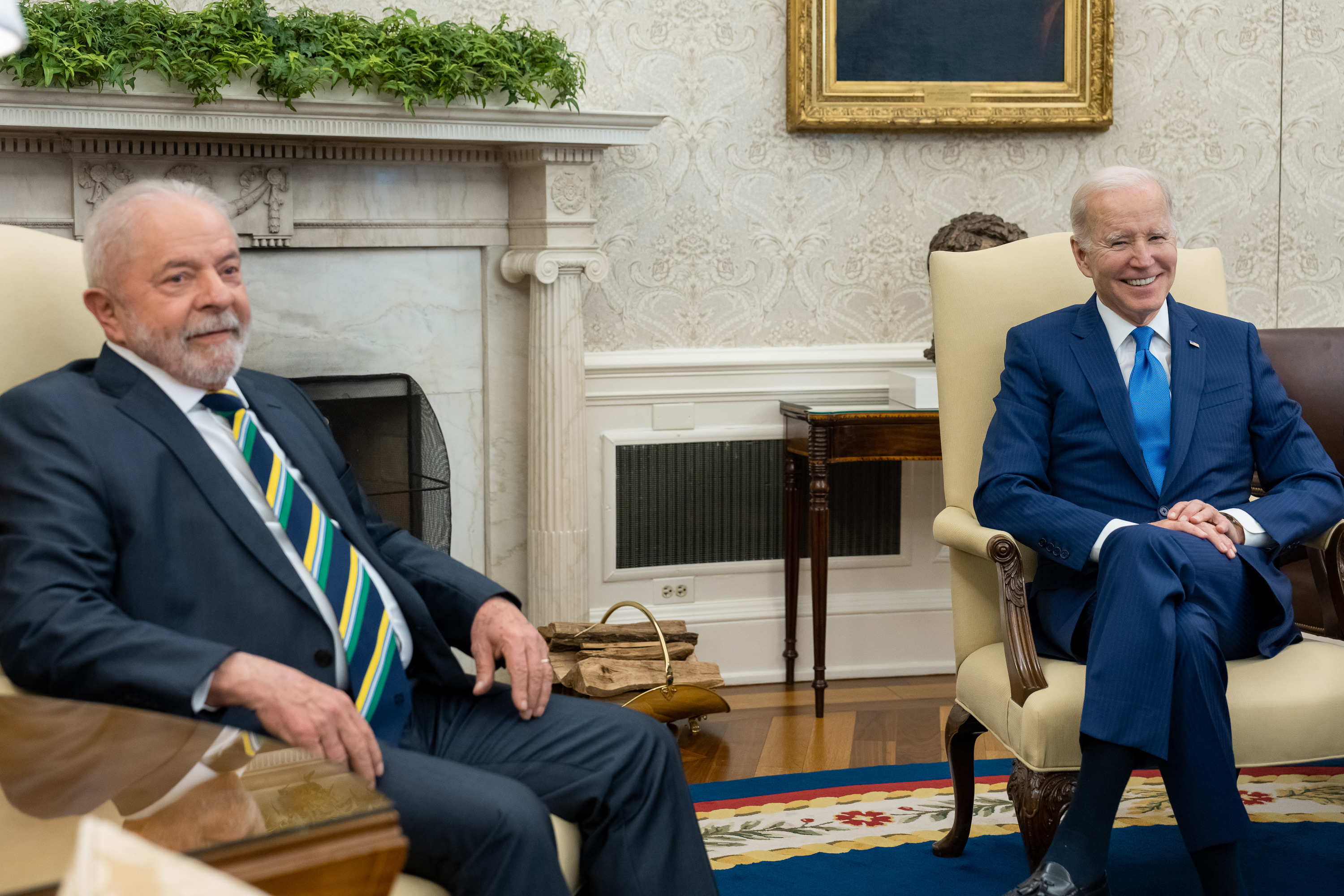

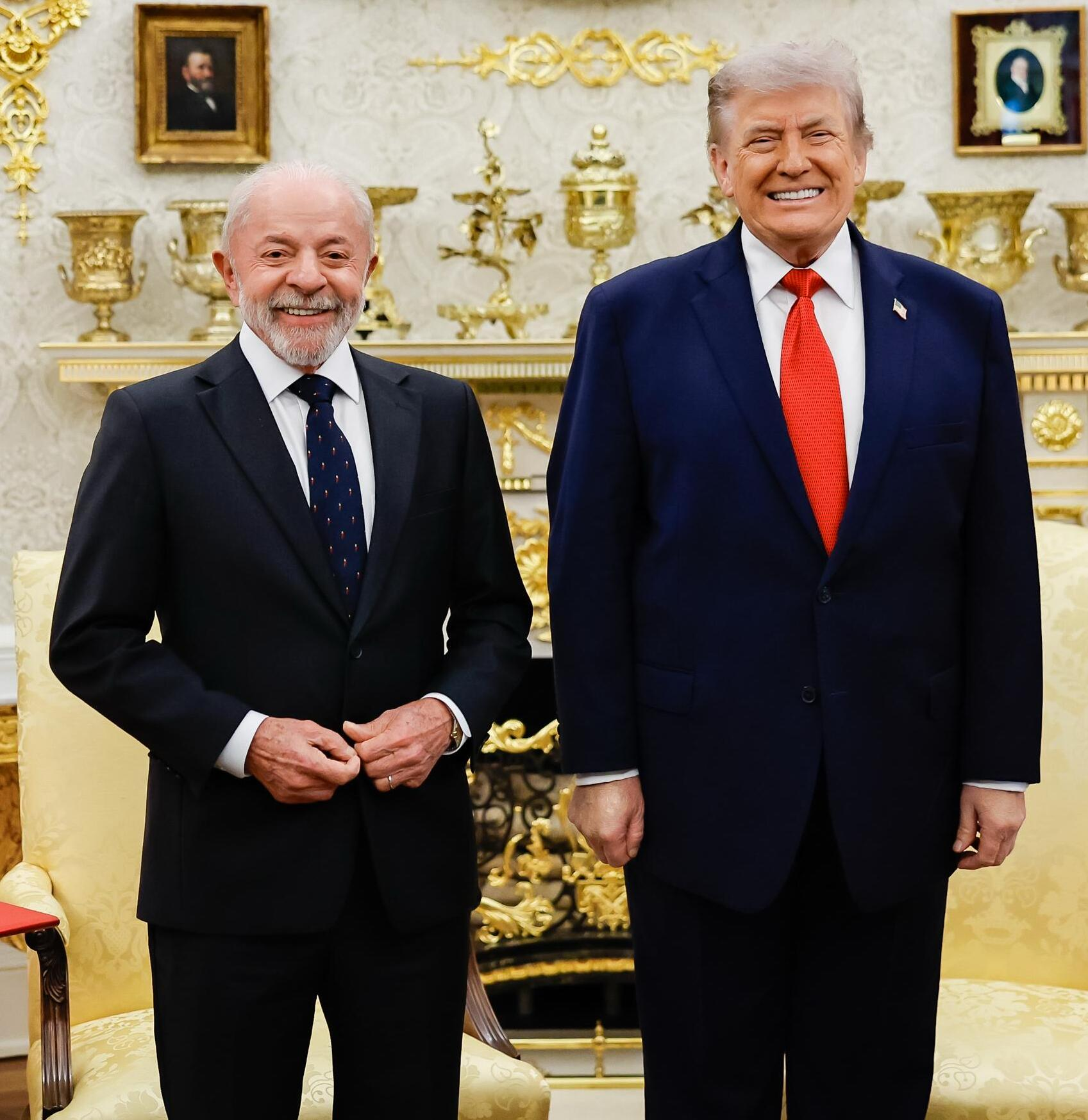

== Chile ==
Table of Trips
Start	End	Guest	Title	Reason
August 6, 1910	August 6, 1910	Pedro Montt	President	Visited President Taft in Beverly while en route to Europe for health reasons. In U.S. August 4–9.
October 15, 1945	October 11, 1945	Juan Antonio Ríos Morales	President	Official visit. In U.S. October 9 – November 1. Afterward visited New York City, Philadelphia, Chicago, San Francisco, and Los Angeles.
April 12, 1950	April 15, 1950	Gabriel González Videla	President	At invitation of the President. Also visited New York City, Philadelphia, Tennessee, Texas, and New Orleans. Departed U.S. May 3.
December 11, 1962	December 13, 1962	Jorge Alessandri Rodríguez	President	Presidential guest. In U.S. December 10–17, visiting Miami, Philadelphia, and New York City.
September 6, 1977	September 9, 1977	Augusto Pinochet	President	Attended signing of the Panama Canal Treaty.
October 2, 1990	October 2, 1990	Patricio Aylwin	President	Met with President Bush during a private visit.
May 12, 1992	May 15, 1992	Patricio Aylwin	President	State Visit.
June 27, 1994	June 28, 1994	Eduardo Frei Ruiz-Tagle	President	Official working visit.
December 9, 1994	December 11, 1994	Eduardo Frei Ruiz-Tagle	President	Attended the Summit of the Americas in Miami
February 25, 1997	February 28, 1997	Eduardo Frei Ruiz-Tagle	President	State Visit. Addressed a joint session of Congress.
April 15, 2001	April 16, 2001	Ricardo Lagos	President	Working visit.
July 18, 2004	July 19, 2004	Ricardo Lagos	President	Working visit.
June 8, 2006	June 9, 2006	Michelle Bachelet	President	Working visit.
September 24, 2008	September 24, 2008	Michelle Bachelet	President	Met with President Bush at the Council of the Americas in New York City.
June 23, 2009	June 23, 2009	Michelle Bachelet	President	Working Visit.
April 12, 2010	April 13, 2010	Sebastián Piñera	President	Attended the Nuclear Security Summit.
November 10, 2011	November 13, 2011	Sebastián Piñera	President	Attended the Asia-Pacific Economic and Cooperation Summit at Honolulu and Kapolei, Hawaii.
June 2, 2013	June 4, 2013	Sebastián Piñera	President	Working Visit.
June 30, 2014	June 30, 2014	Michelle Bachelet	President	Working Visit.
March 31, 2016	April 1, 2016	Michelle Bachelet	President	Attended the Nuclear Security Summit.
September 28, 2018	September 28, 2018	Sebastián Piñera	President	Working Visit.
June 8, 2022	June 10, 2022	Gabriel Boric	President	Attended the Summit of the Americas in Los Angeles, California.
November 2, 2023	November 2, 2023	Gabriel Boric	President	Met with President Biden for a bilateral meeting alongside the Americas Partnership for Economic Prosperity Summit Meeting.
November 3, 2023	November 3, 2023	Gabriel Boric	President	Attended the APEP Leaders' Summit.
November 12, 2023	November 17, 2023	Gabriel Boric	President	Attended the APEC Leaders' Summit at San Francisco, California.

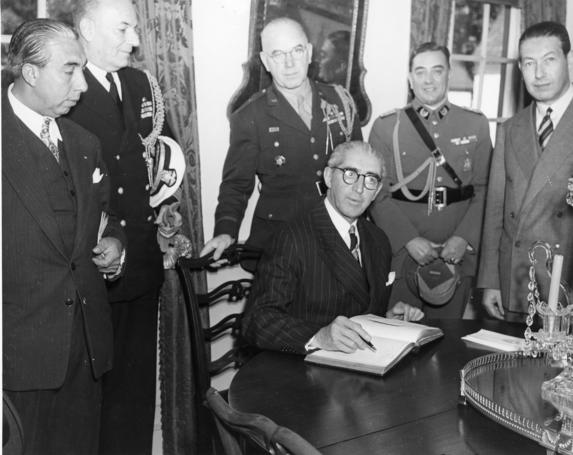

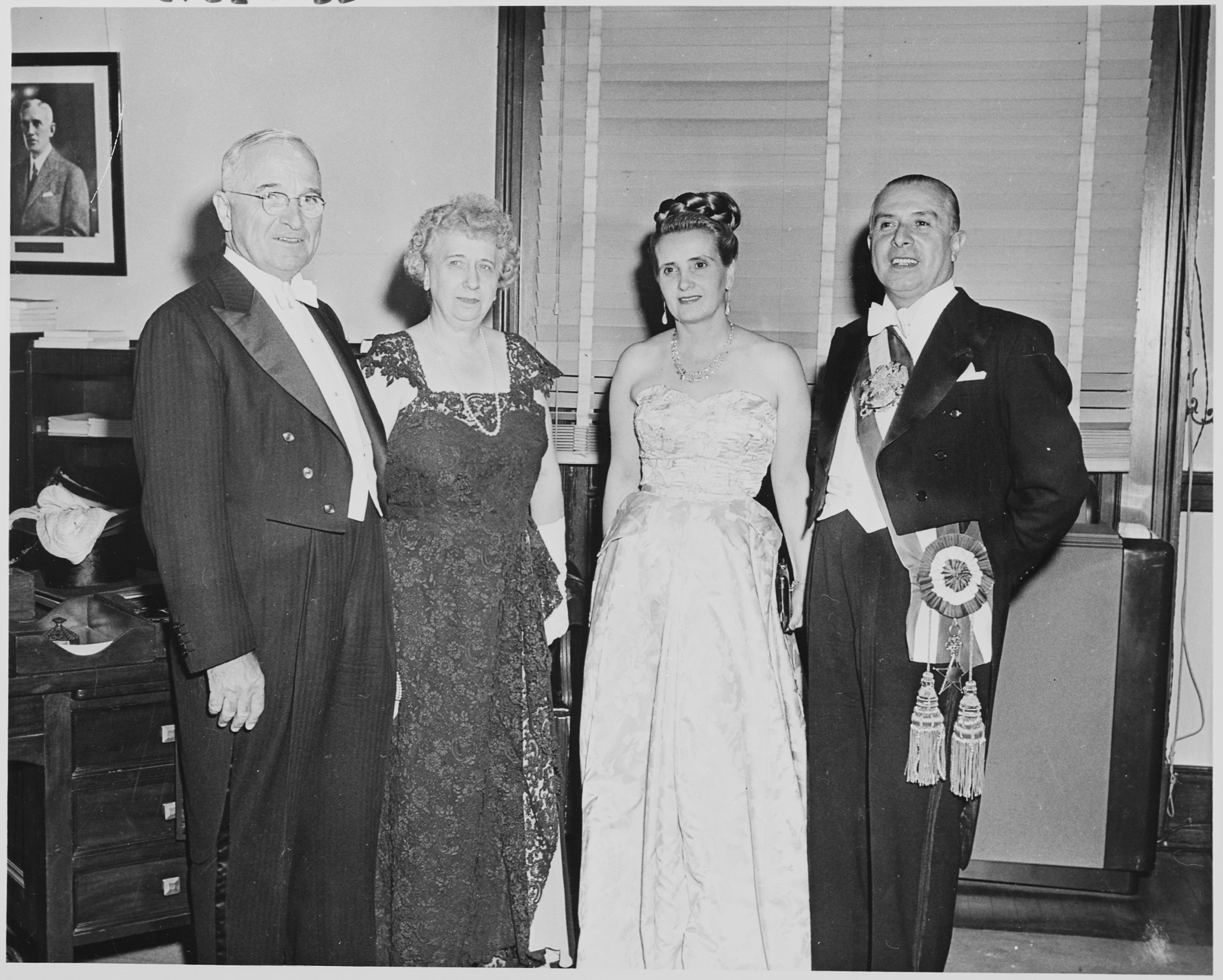

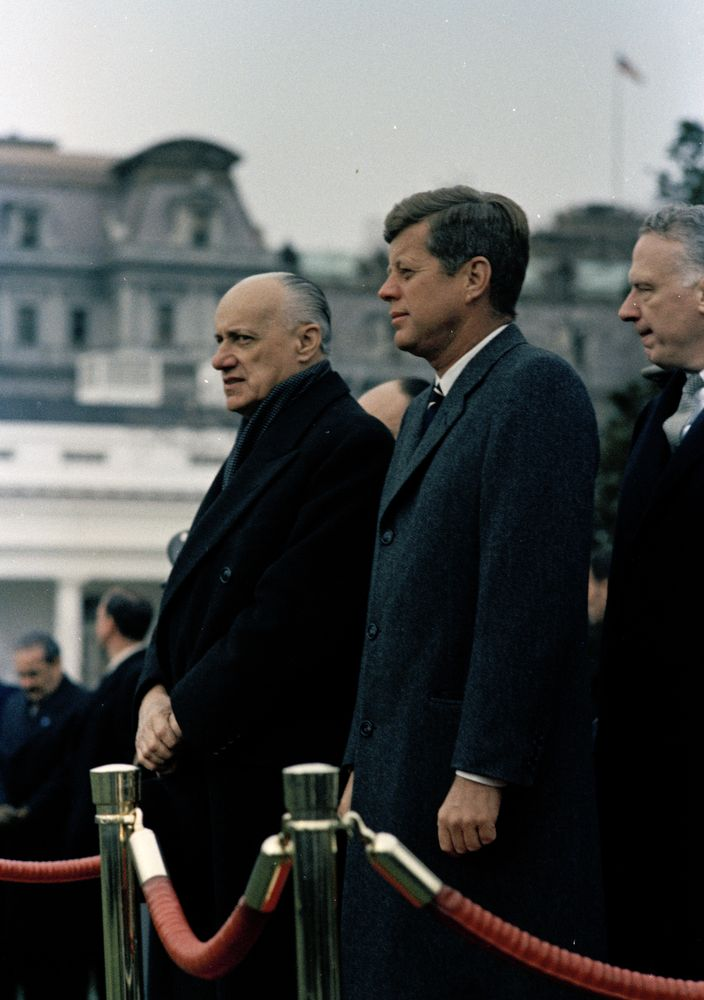

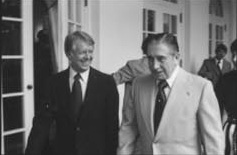

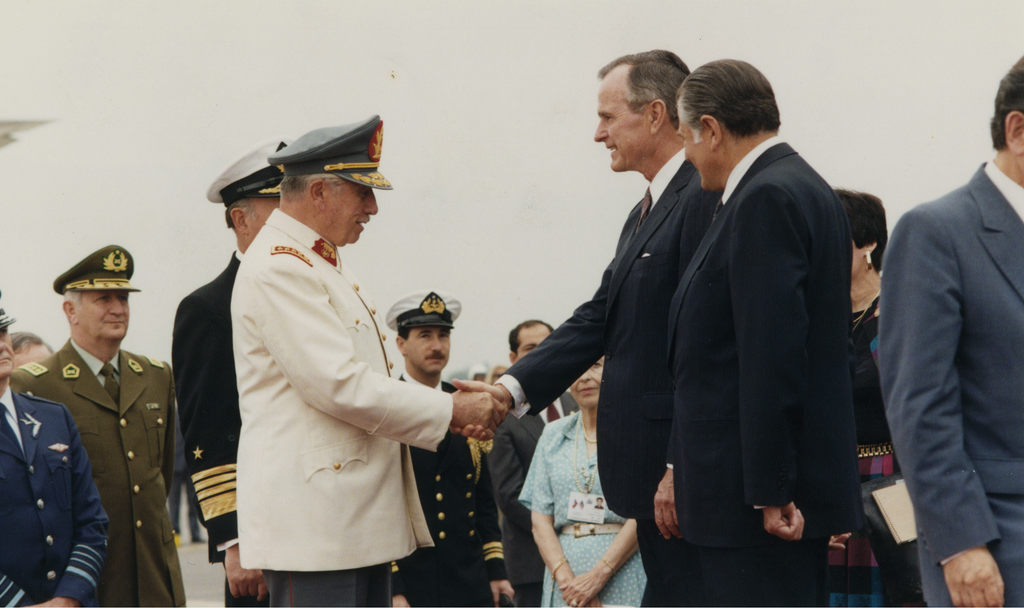

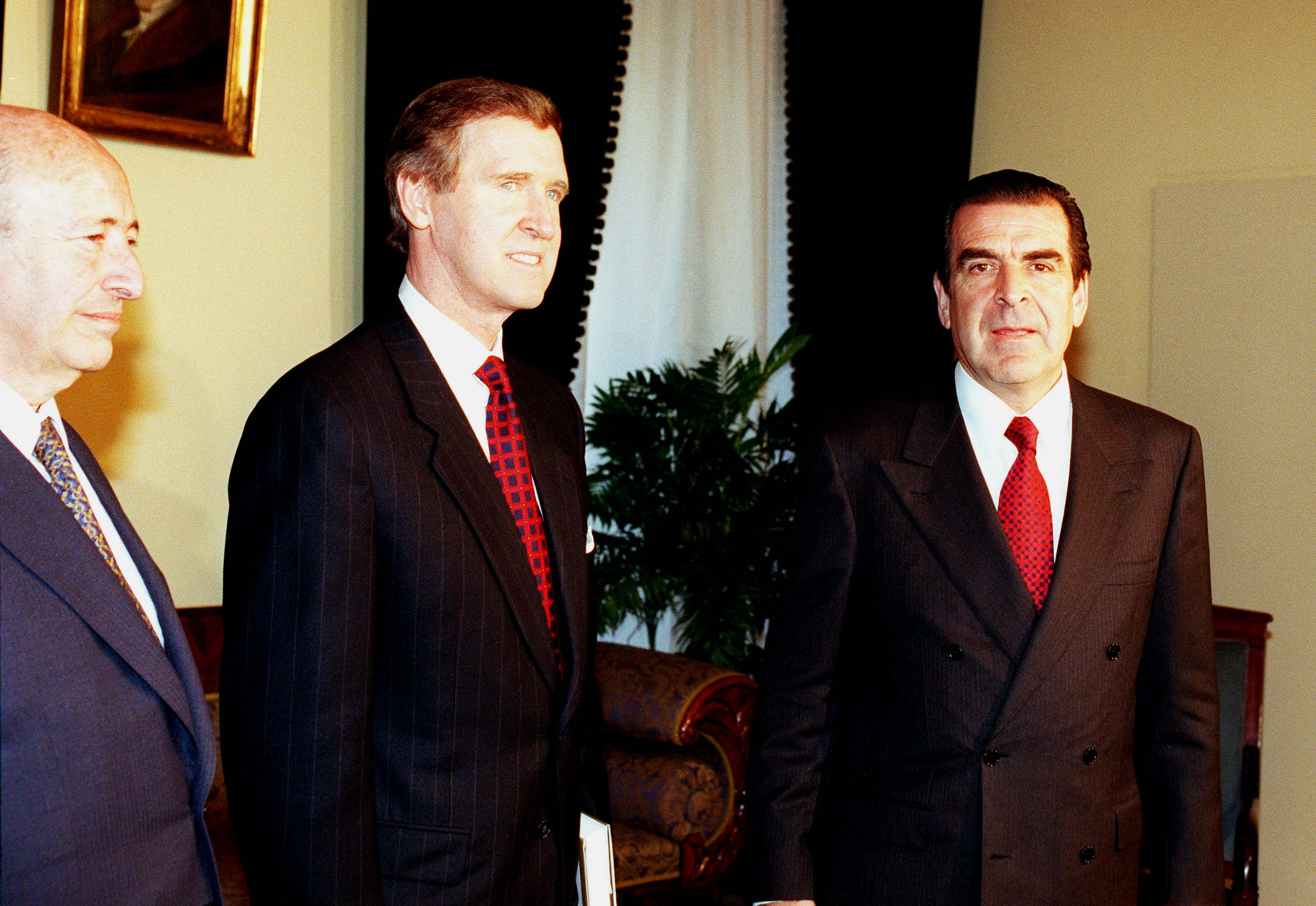

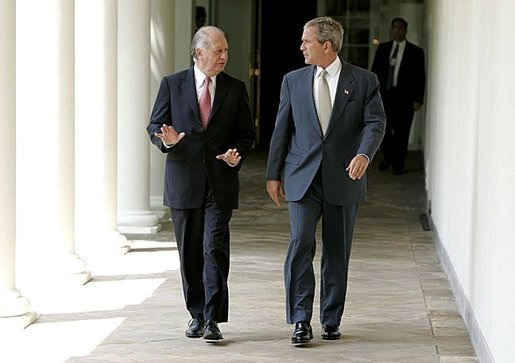

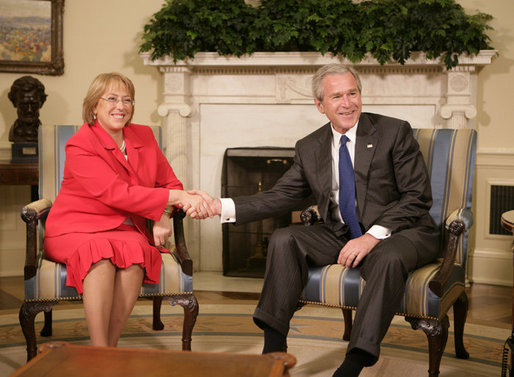

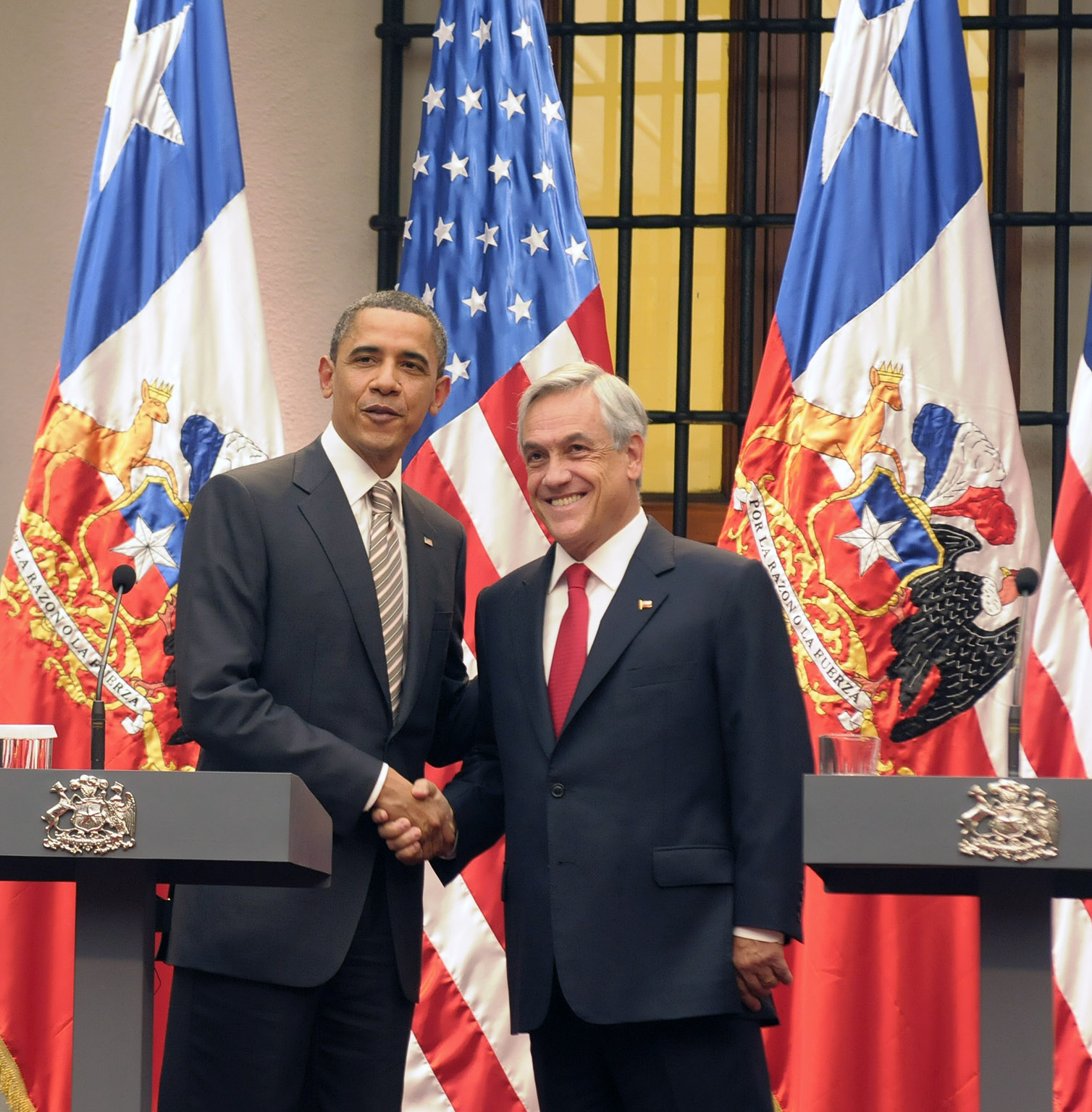

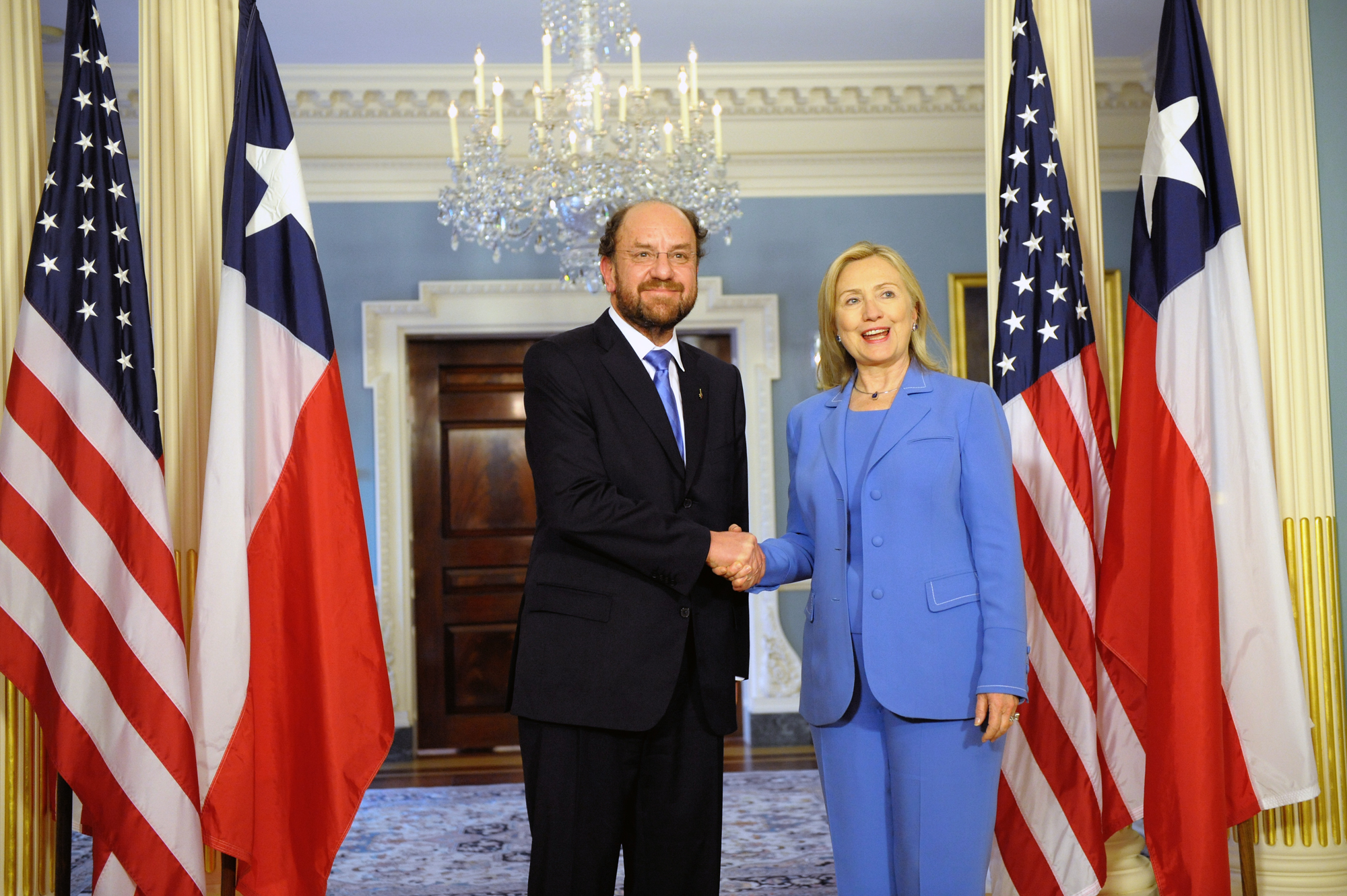

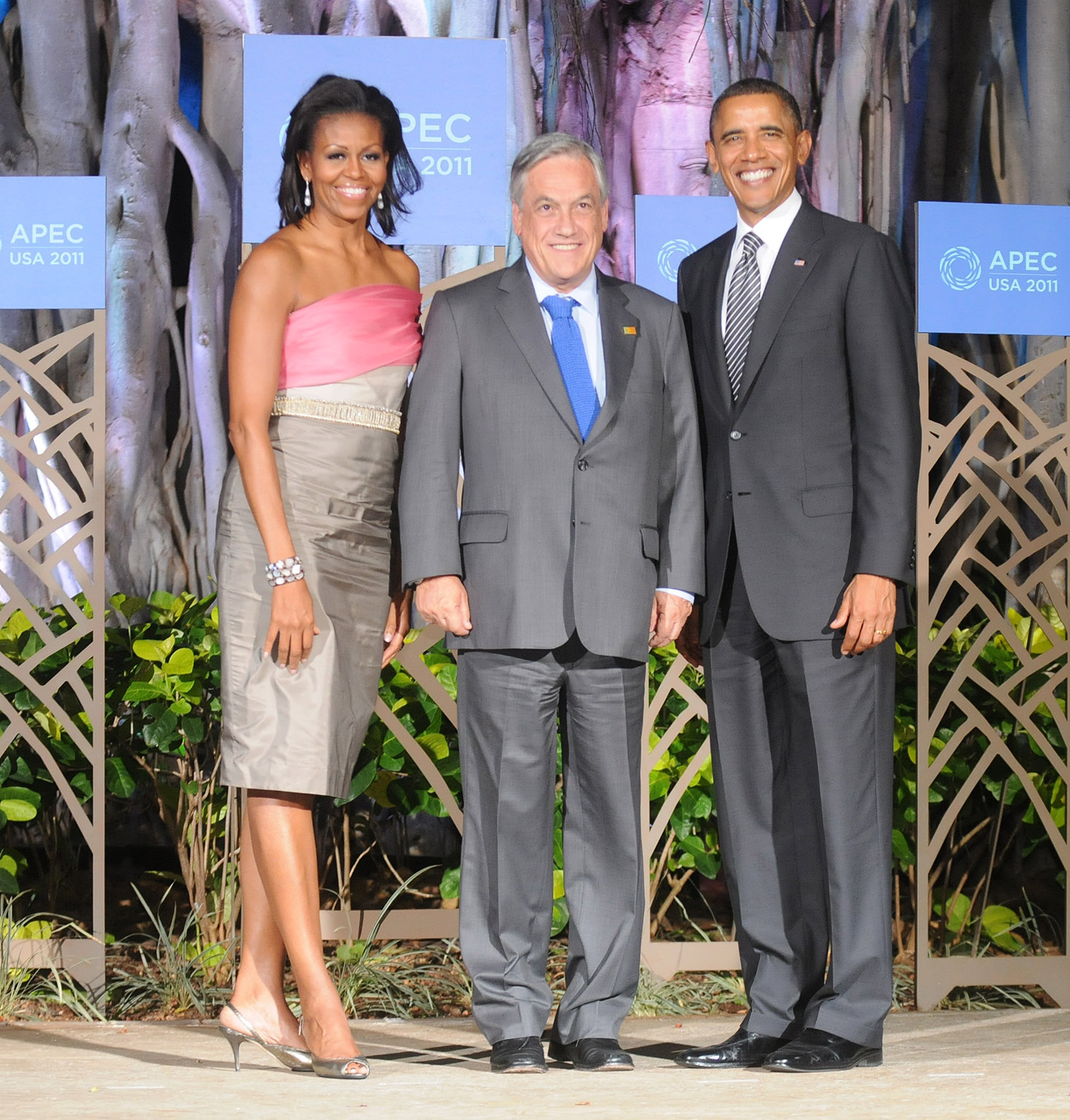

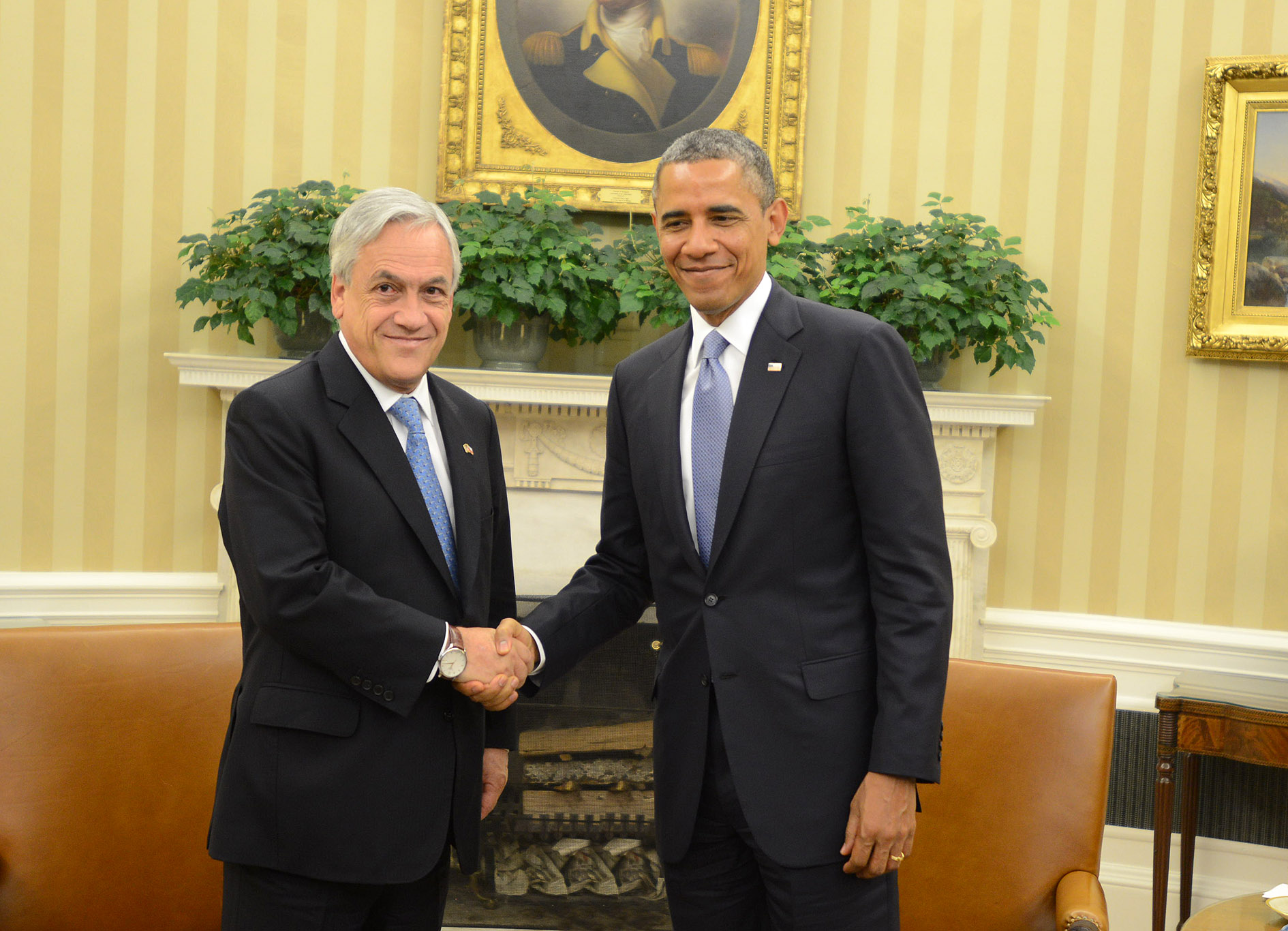

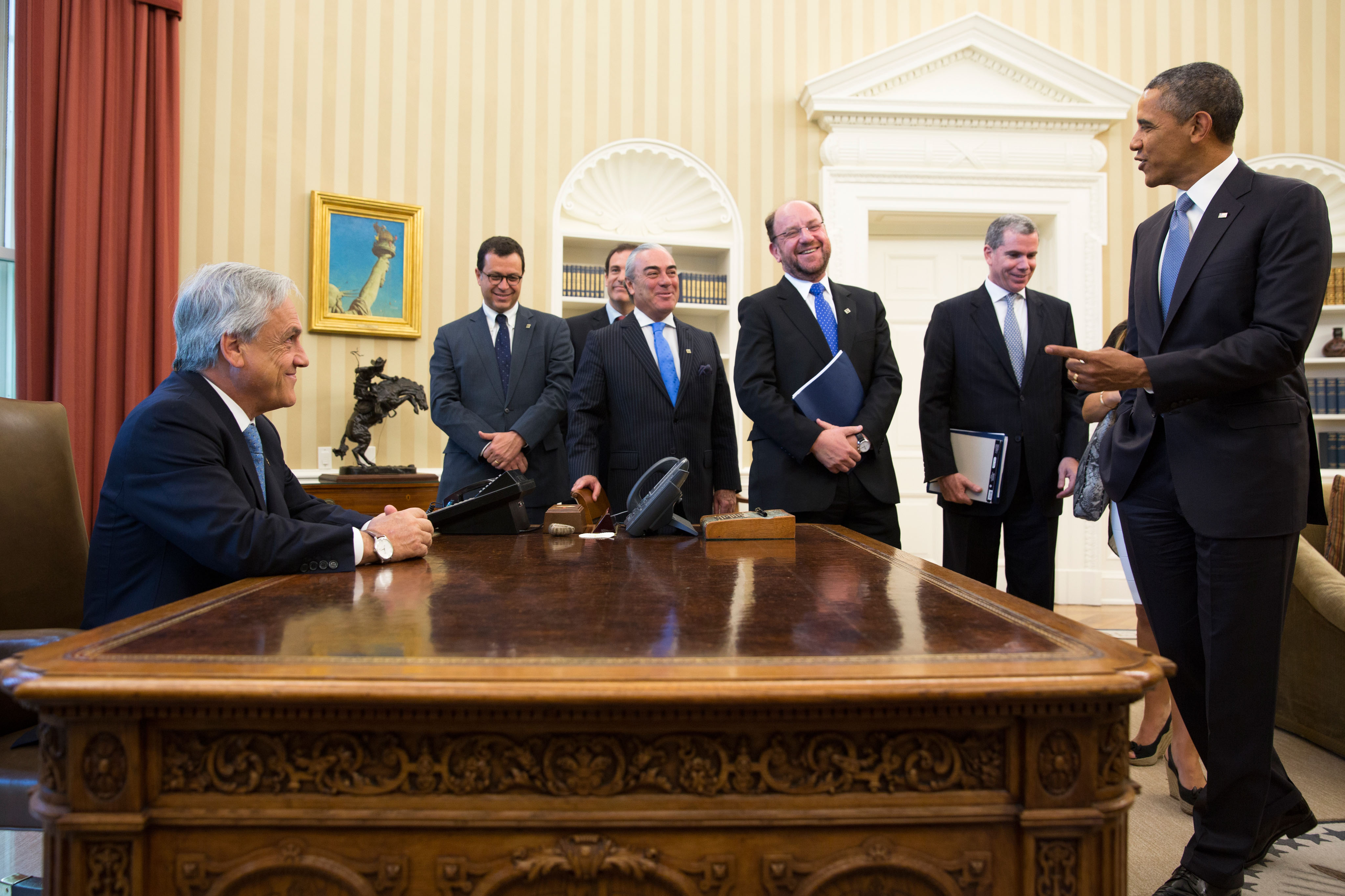

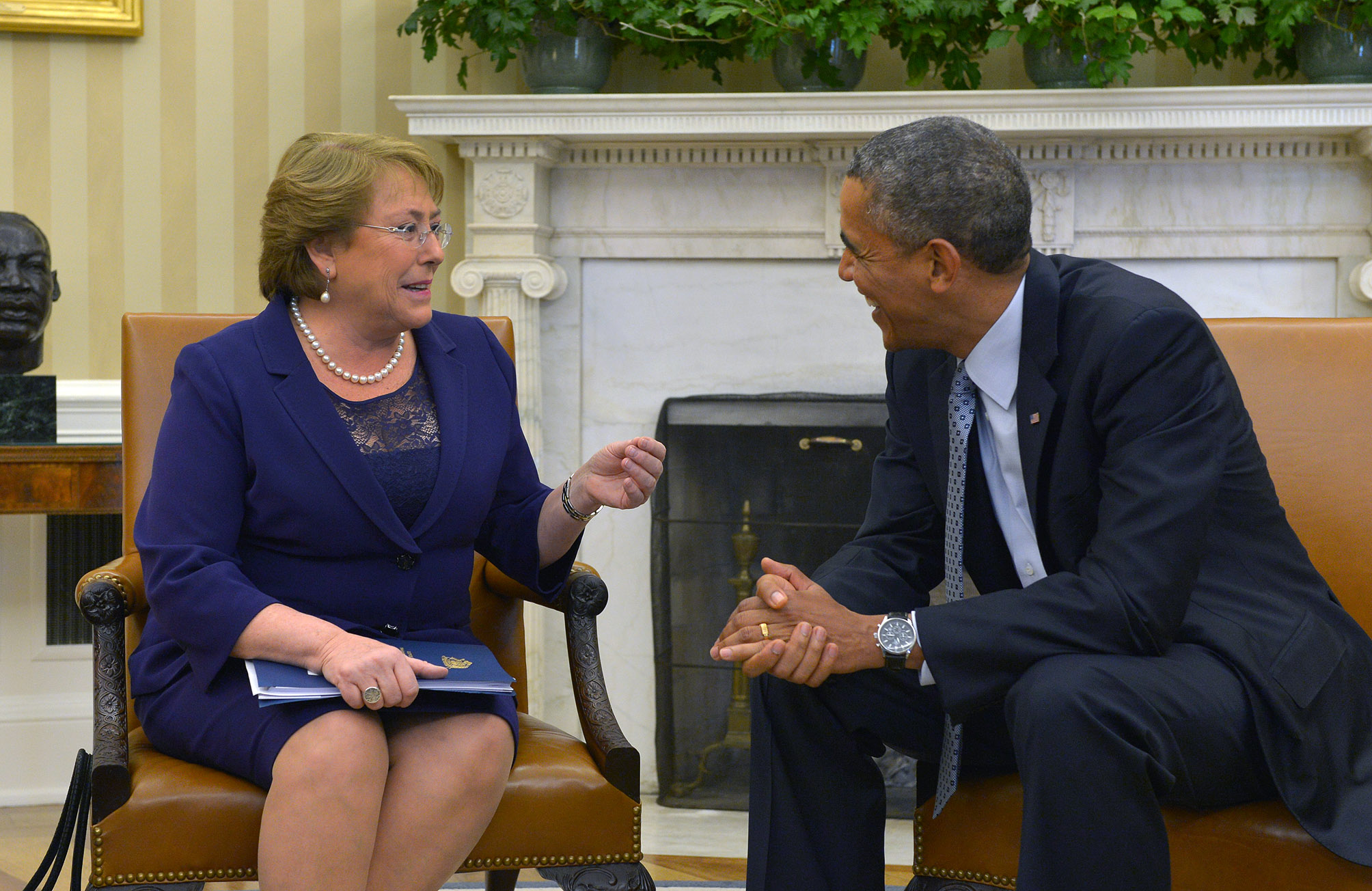

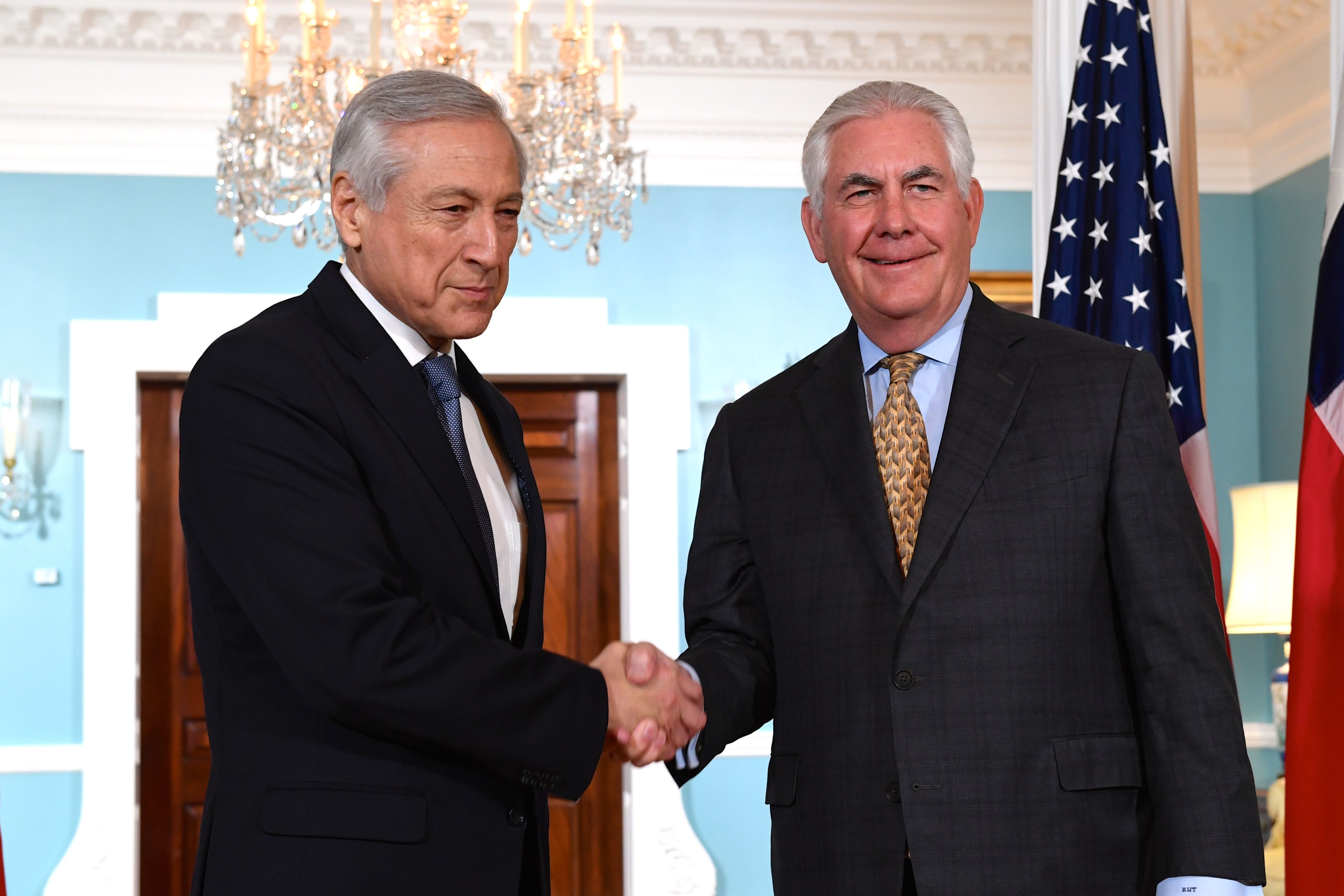

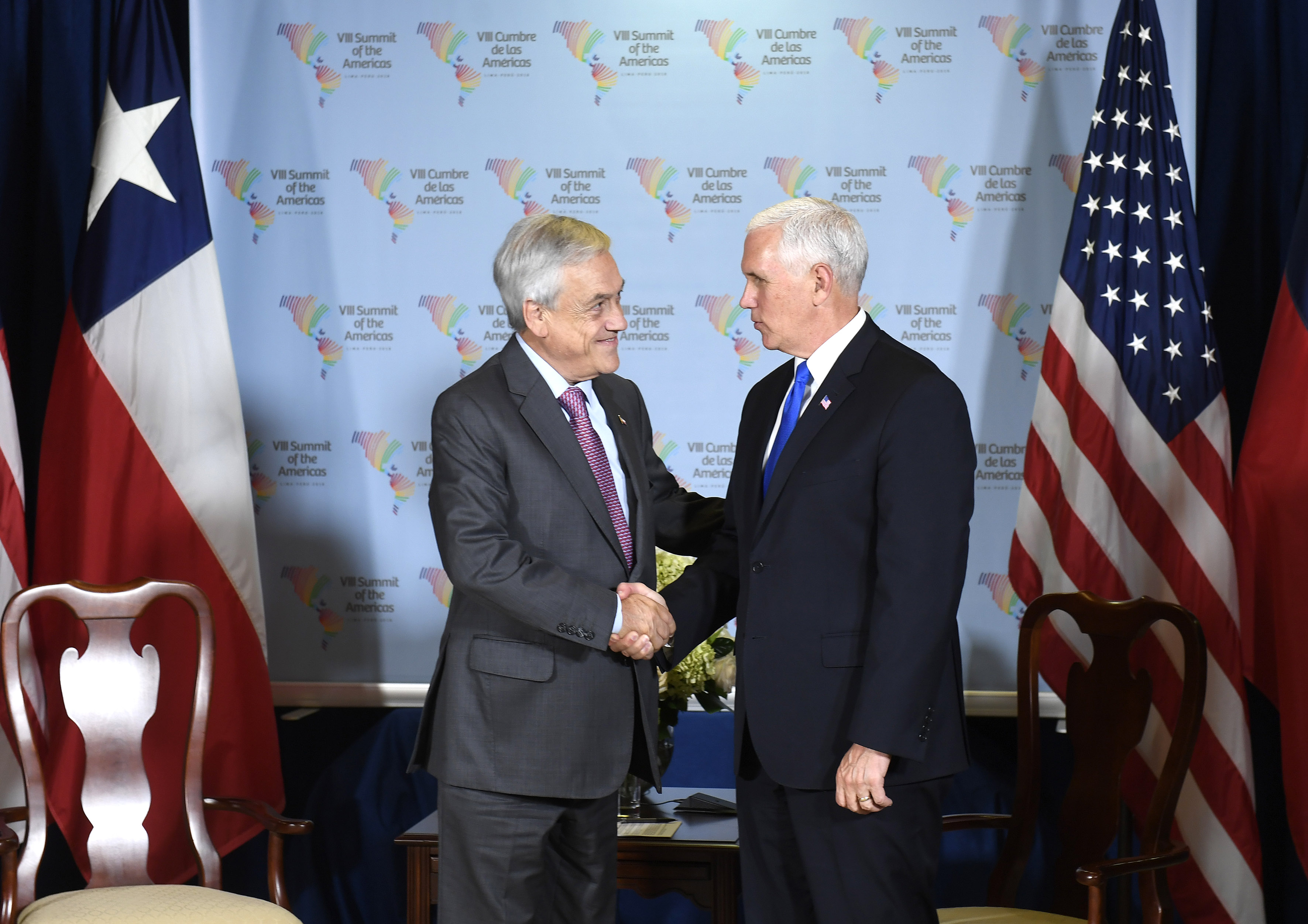

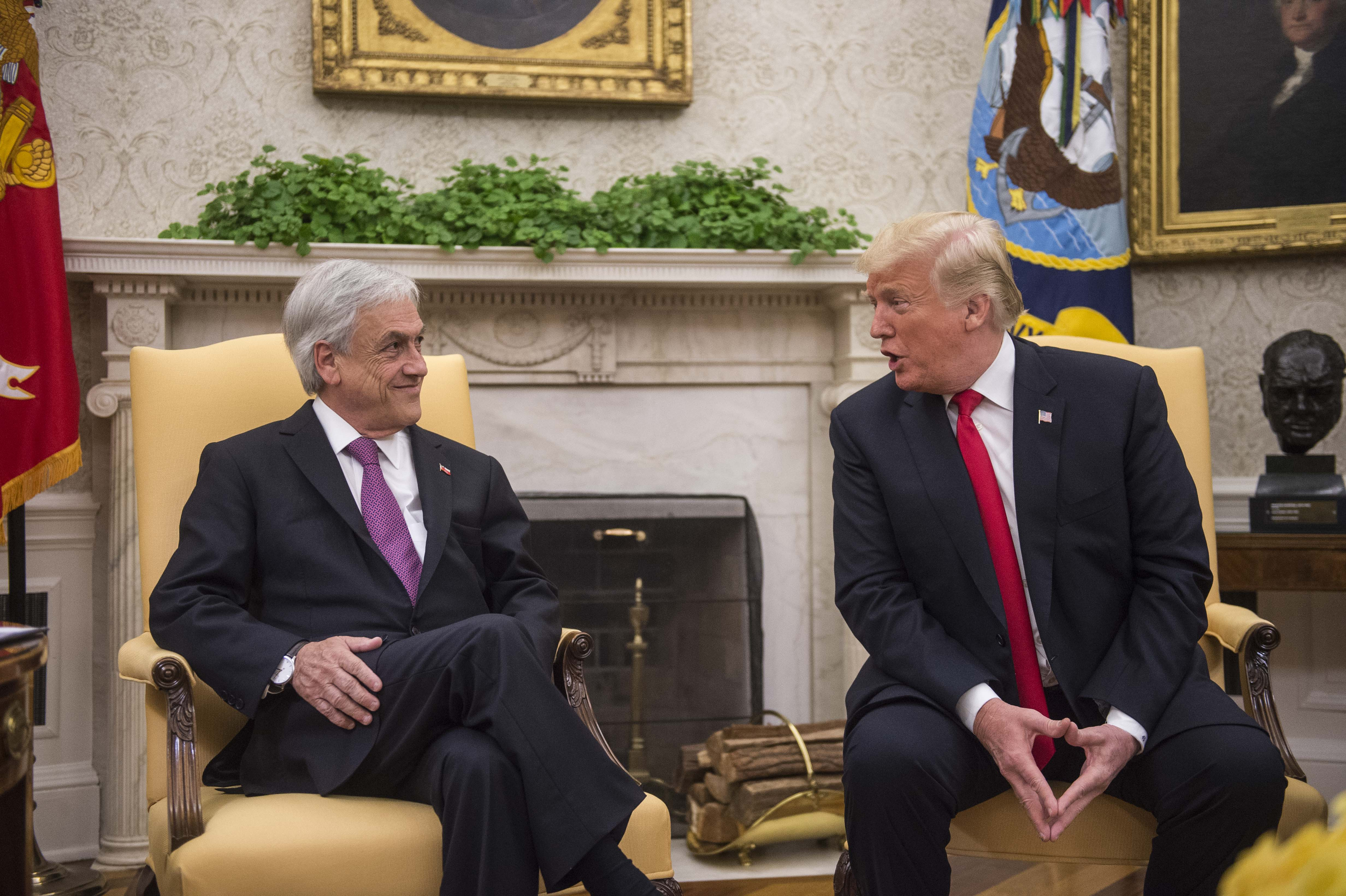

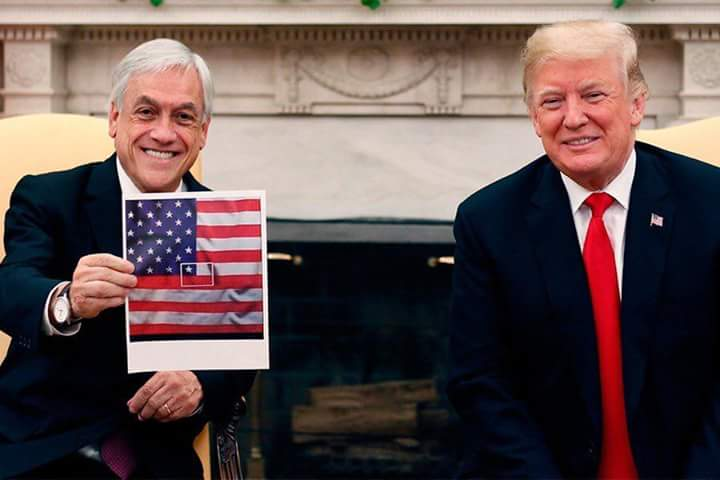

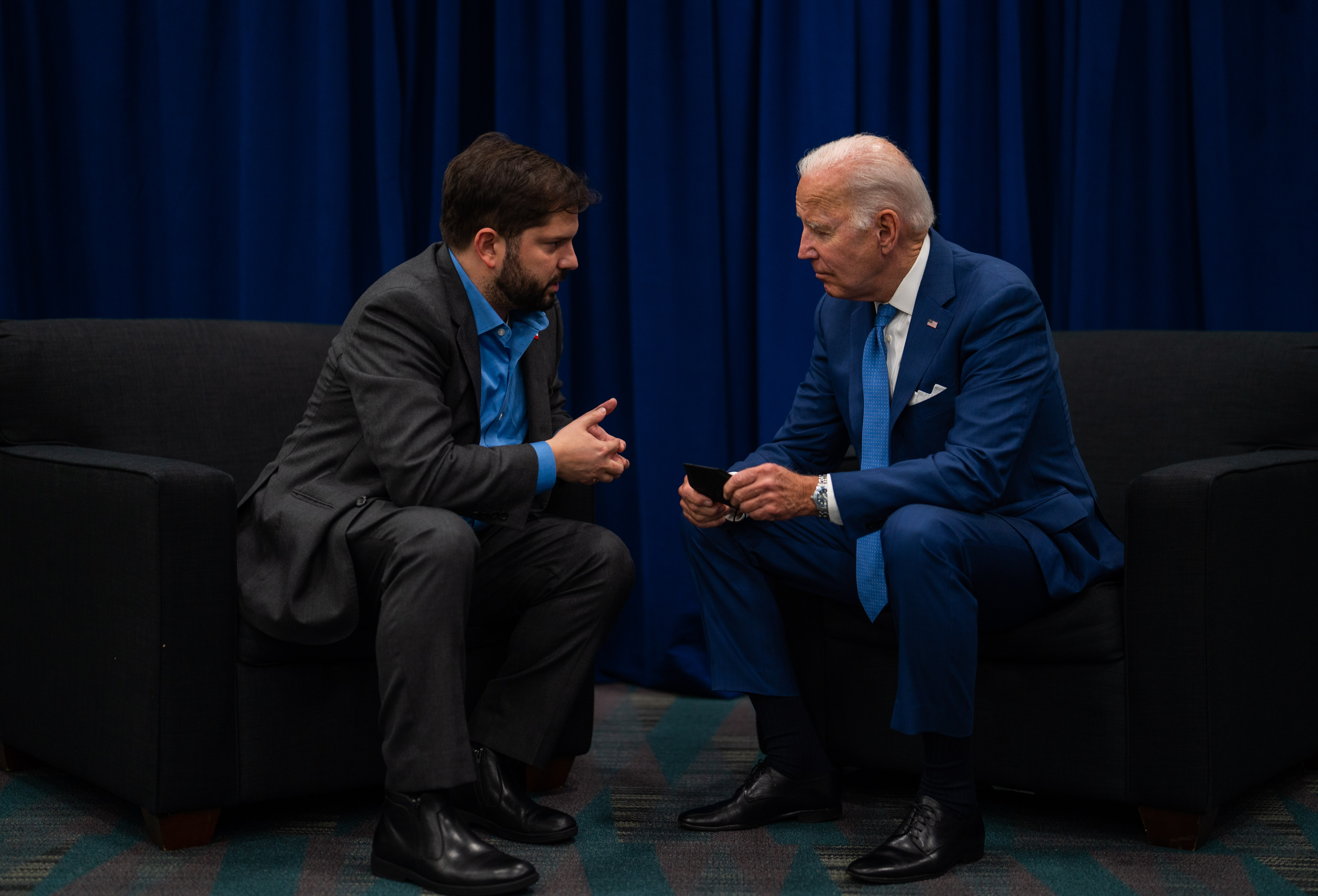

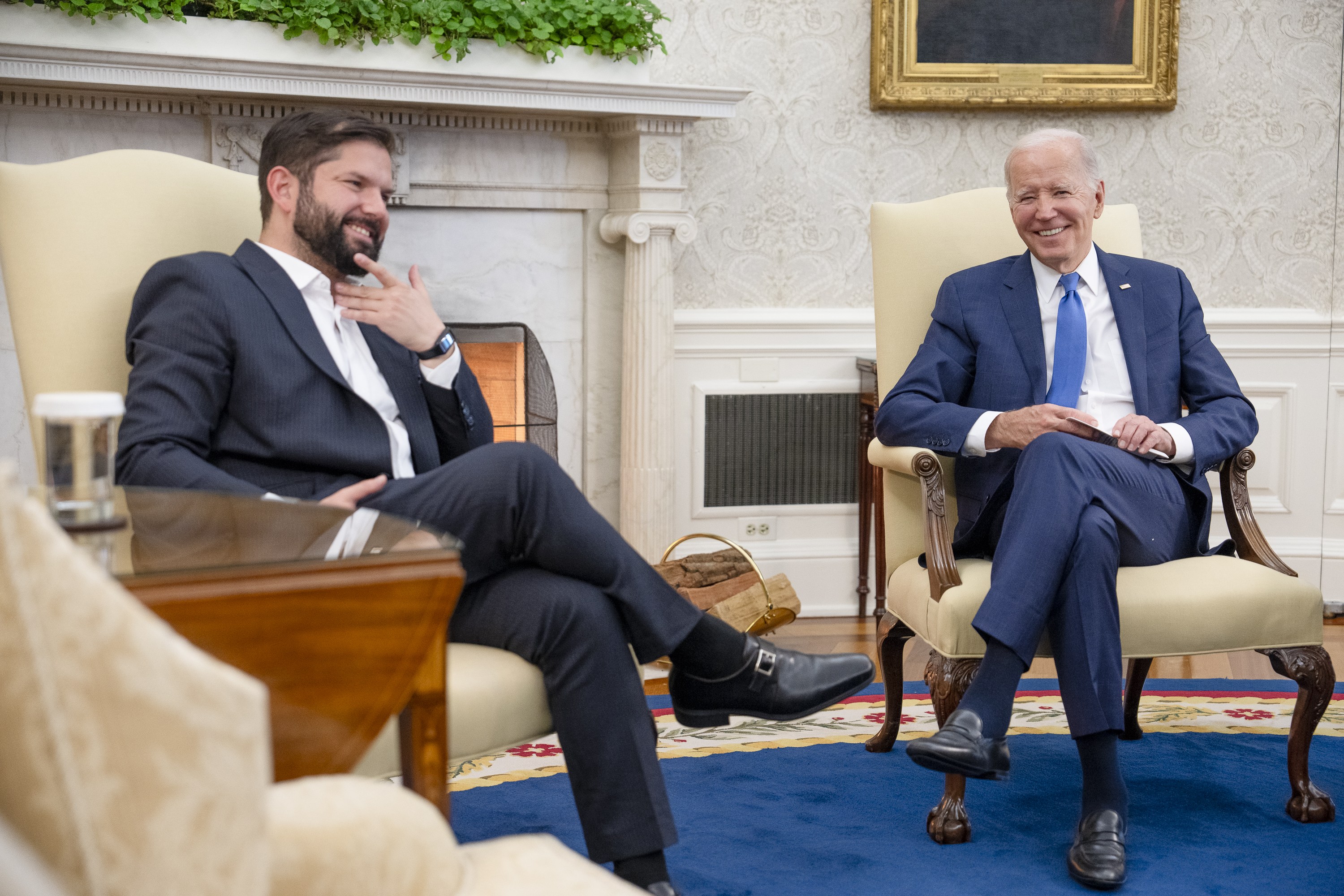

== Colombia ==
Table of Trips
Start	End	Guest	Title	Reason
May 3, 1922	May 5, 1922	Pedro Nel Ospina	President	In U.S. April 24 – June 2; visited New York City.
June 2, 1930	June 5, 1930	Enrique Olaya Herrera	President	In U.S. April 20 – July 2, visiting Chicago, New York City, New London, and West Point. Revisited Washington, D.C. June 18.
June 24, 1934	June 26, 1934	Alfonso López Pumarejo	President	Afterwards visited New York City, June 26 – July 5.
July 7, 1942	July 11, 1942	Alfonso López Pumarejo	President	Guest of U.S. Government. In U.S. July 3–28, visiting New York City and Miami
January 17, 1944	January 17, 1944	Alfonso López Pumarejo	President	Signed the UN Declaration. Arrived in U.S. November 26, to obtain medical treatment for his wife at Mayo Clinic, Rochester. Visited New York City.
June 5, 1946	June 8, 1946	Mariano Ospina Pérez	President	Arrived in the U.S. June 2. Also visited Miami, New York City, and Tennessee.
April 5, 1960	April 8, 1960	Carlos Lleras Restrepo	President	State visit at Washington, D.C. and at Camp David In U.S. April 4–17, visiting Charleston, Hot Springs and Roanoke, New York City, and Miami.
June 23, 1962	June 27, 1962	Guillermo León Valencia	President	Informal visit. In U.S. June 20 – July 28, visiting New York City and Baltimore; obtained medical treatment at Johns Hopkins Hospital.
June 12, 1969	June 13, 1969	Carlos Lleras Restrepo	President	State visit. In U.S. June 11–18; visited Williamsburg and New York City.
September 25, 1975	September 27, 1975	Alfonso López Michelsen	President	State visit. In U.S. September 24–30. Private visit to New York City.
April 2, 1985	April 4, 1985	Belisario Betancur	President	Official Working Visit.
September 27, 1989	September 28, 1989	Virgilio Barco Vargas	President	Met with President Bush September 28 during a private visit.
June 5, 1990	June 5, 1990	Virgilio Barco Vargas	President	Private visit.
July 13, 1990	July 13, 1990	César Gaviria	President	Met with President Bush during a private visit.
August 29, 1990	August 29, 1990	César Gaviria	President	Met with President Bush at the U.N. General Assembly.
February 25, 1991	February 27, 1991	César Gaviria	President	Official working visit. Afterwards visited Miami.
February 26, 1992	February 27, 1992	César Gaviria	President	Attended Drug Summit in San Antonio
August 27, 1993	August 27, 1993	César Gaviria	President	Met with President Clinton at the U.N. General Assembly in New York City.
December 9, 1994	December 11, 1994	Ernesto Samper	President	Attended the Summit of the Americas in Miami
August 1, 1998	August 1, 1998	Andrés Pastrana Arango	President	Met with President Clinton during a private visit.
October 27, 1998	October 28, 1998	Andrés Pastrana Arango	President	State visit.
September 21, 1999	September 21, 1999	Andrés Pastrana Arango	President	Met with President Clinton during a meeting of the United Nations General Assembly in New York City.
January 24, 2000	January 26, 2000	Andrés Pastrana Arango	President	Private visit; addressed U.S. Conference of Mayors.
February 24, 2001	February 27, 2001	Andrés Pastrana Arango	President	Working visit; arrived in the US February 24, addressed the National Governors' Association.
November 11, 2001	November 11, 2001	Andrés Pastrana Arango	President	Met with President Bush at the UN General Assembly in New York City
April 16, 2002	April 19, 2002	Andrés Pastrana Arango	President	Working
June 20, 2002	June 20, 2002	Alvaro Uribe	President	Met with President Bush during a private visit.
September 23, 2002	September 26, 2002	Alvaro Uribe	President	Working visit.
April 29, 2003	May 5, 2003	Alvaro Uribe	President	Working visit.
September 30, 2003	October 10, 2003	Alvaro Uribe	President	Working visit.
March 22, 2004	March 25, 2004	Alvaro Uribe	President	Working visit.
August 4, 2005	August 4, 2005	Alvaro Uribe	President	Working visit. Met with President Bush in Crawford
February 14, 2006	February 18, 2006	Alvaro Uribe	President	Working visit
September 13, 2006	September 14, 2006	Alvaro Uribe	President	Working visit
May 1, 2007	May 4, 2007	Alvaro Uribe	President	Working visit
September 18, 2008	September 21, 2008	Alvaro Uribe	President	Working visit
September 24, 2008	September 24, 2008	Alvaro Uribe	President	Met with President Bush at the Council of the Americas in New York City.
January 13, 2009	January 13, 2009	Alvaro Uribe	President	Received the Presidential Medal of Freedom along with former British Prime Minister Tony Blair and former Australian Prime Minister John Howard.
June 29, 2009	June 29, 2009	Alvaro Uribe	President	Working visit
September 24, 2010	September 24, 2010	Juan Manuel Santos	President	Met with President Obama at the U.N. General Assembly in New York City.
April 7, 2011	April 7, 2011	Juan Manuel Santos	President	Working visit
December 2, 2013	December 4, 2013	Juan Manuel Santos	President	Working visit
February 4, 2016	February 4, 2016	Juan Manuel Santos	President	Official Working visit
May 18, 2017	May 18, 2017	Juan Manuel Santos	President	Official Working visit
February 12, 2019	February 17, 2019	Iván Duque Márquez	President	Official Working visit
March 2, 2020	March 2, 2020	Iván Duque Márquez	President	Working Visit.
March 10, 2022	March 10, 2022	Iván Duque Márquez	President	Working Visit.
June 8, 2022	June 10, 2022	Iván Duque Márquez	President	Attended the Summit of the Americas in Los Angeles, California.
April 20, 2023	April 20, 2023	Gustavo Petro	President	Working Visit.
November 3, 2023	November 3, 2023	Gustavo Petro	President	Attended the APEP Leaders' Summit.
November 12, 2023	November 17, 2023	Gustavo Petro	President	Invited Guest to APEC Leaders' Summit.
February 3, 2026	February 3, 2026	Gustavo Petro	President	Working Visit.

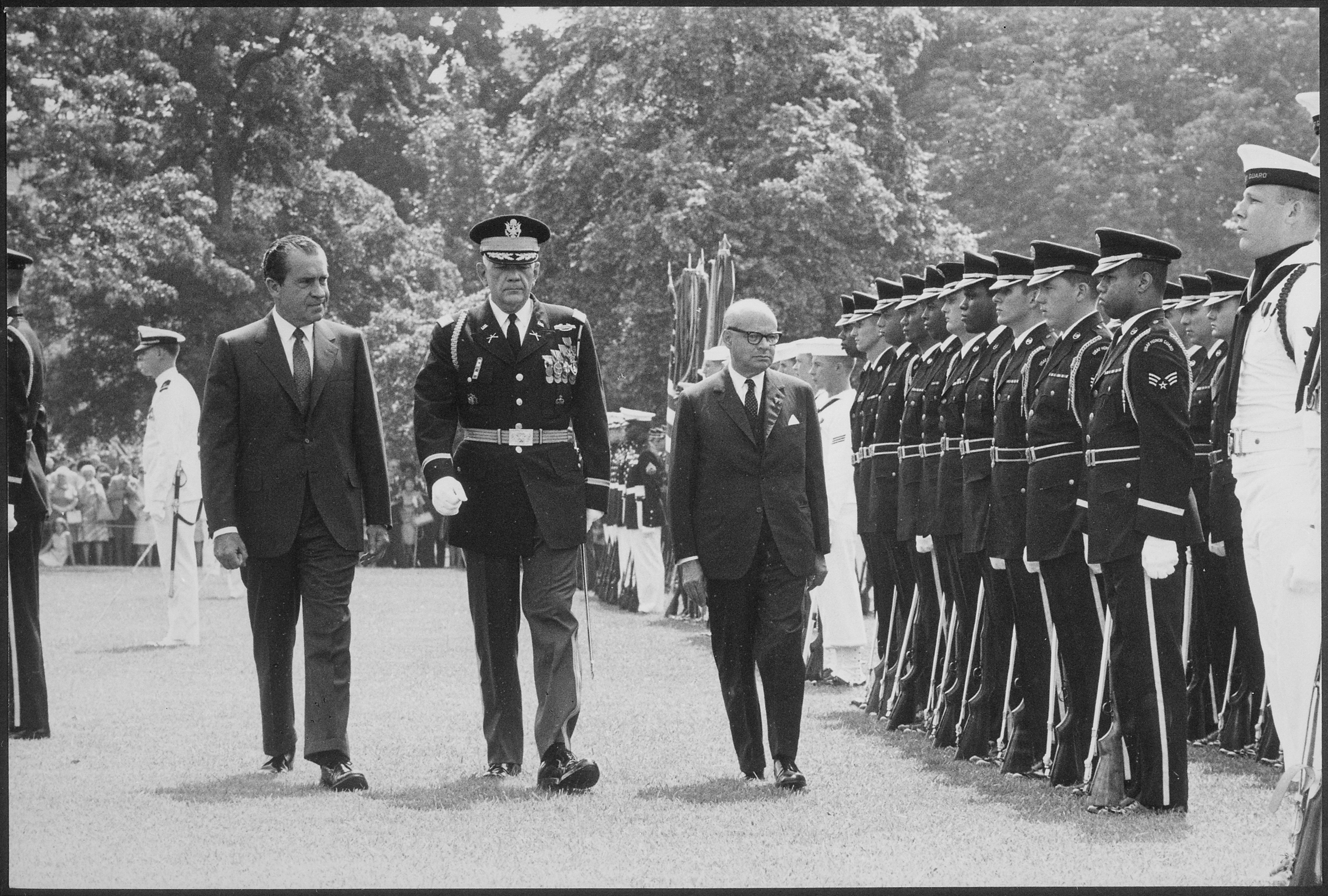

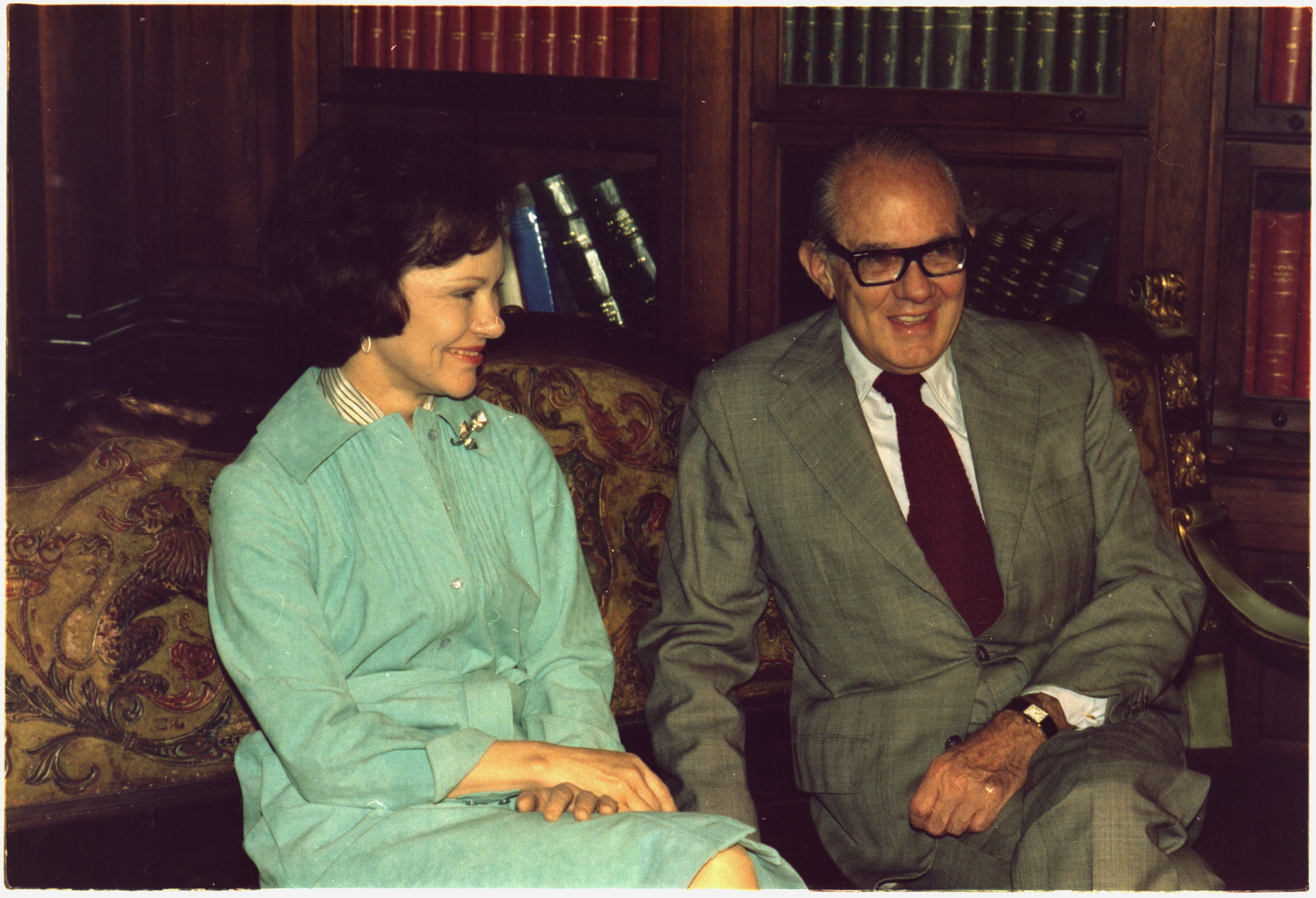

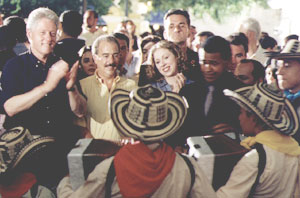

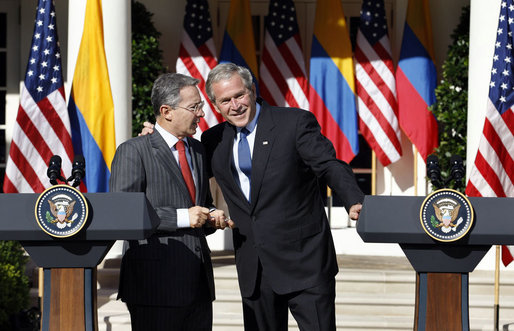

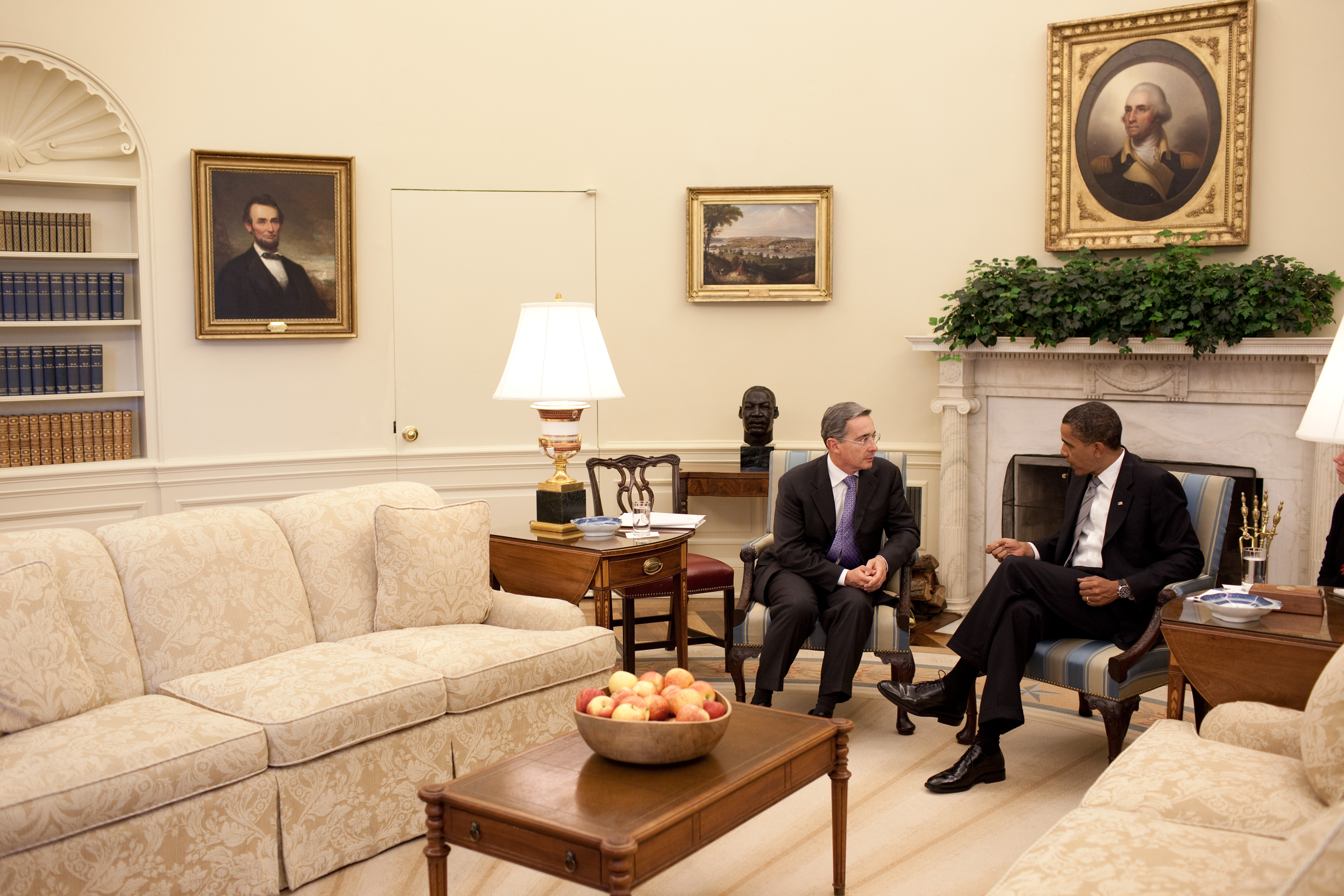

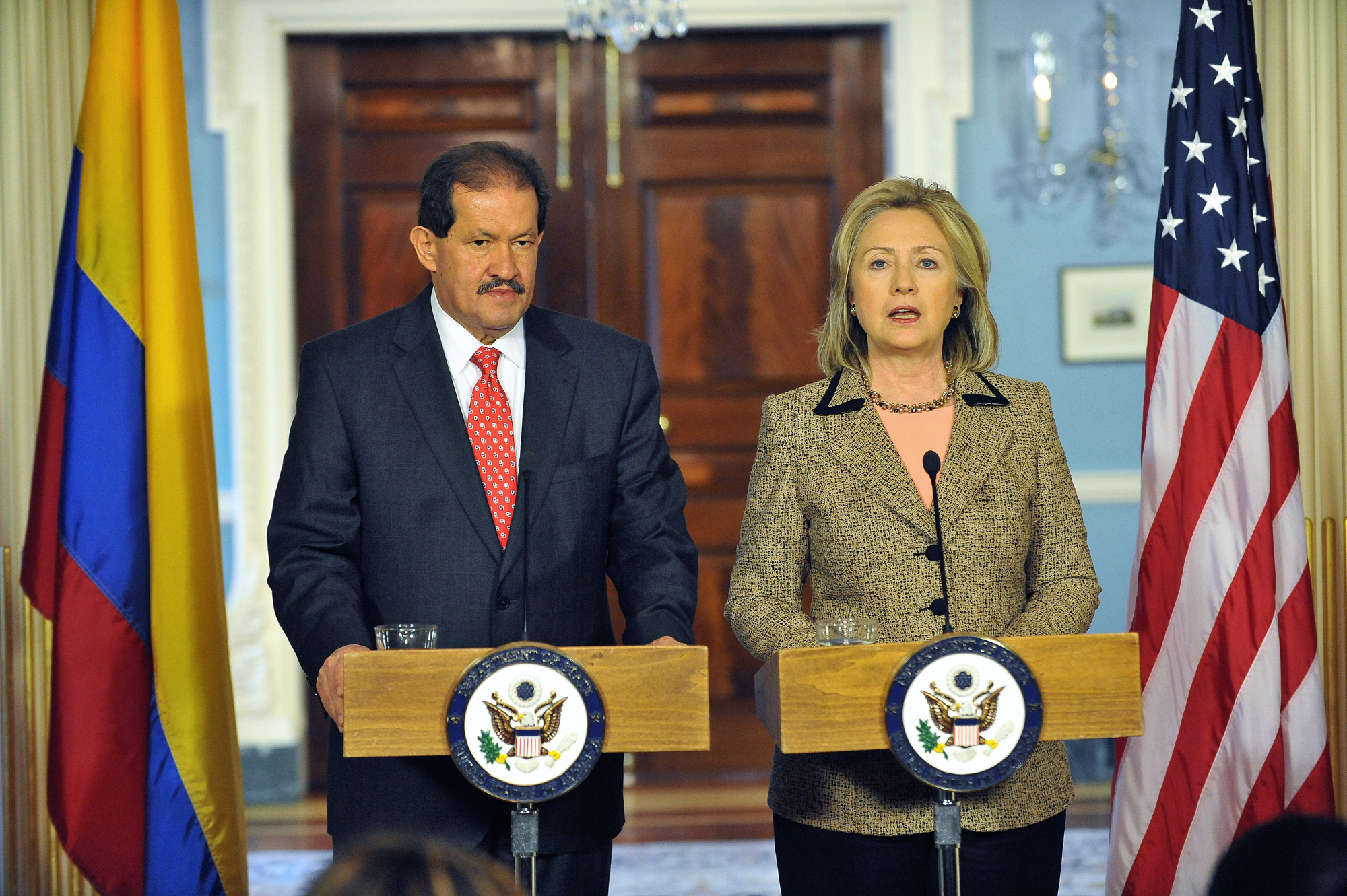

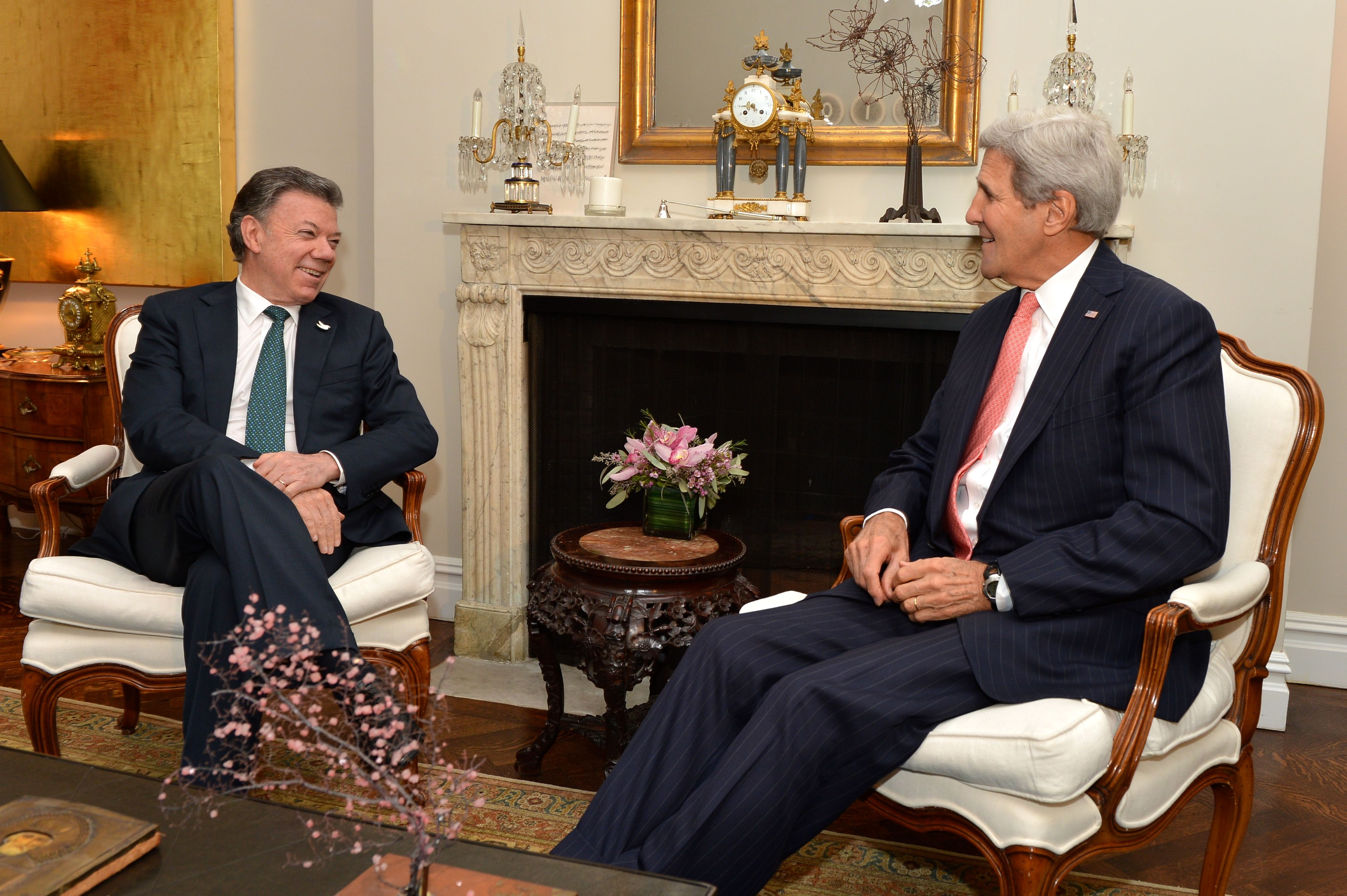

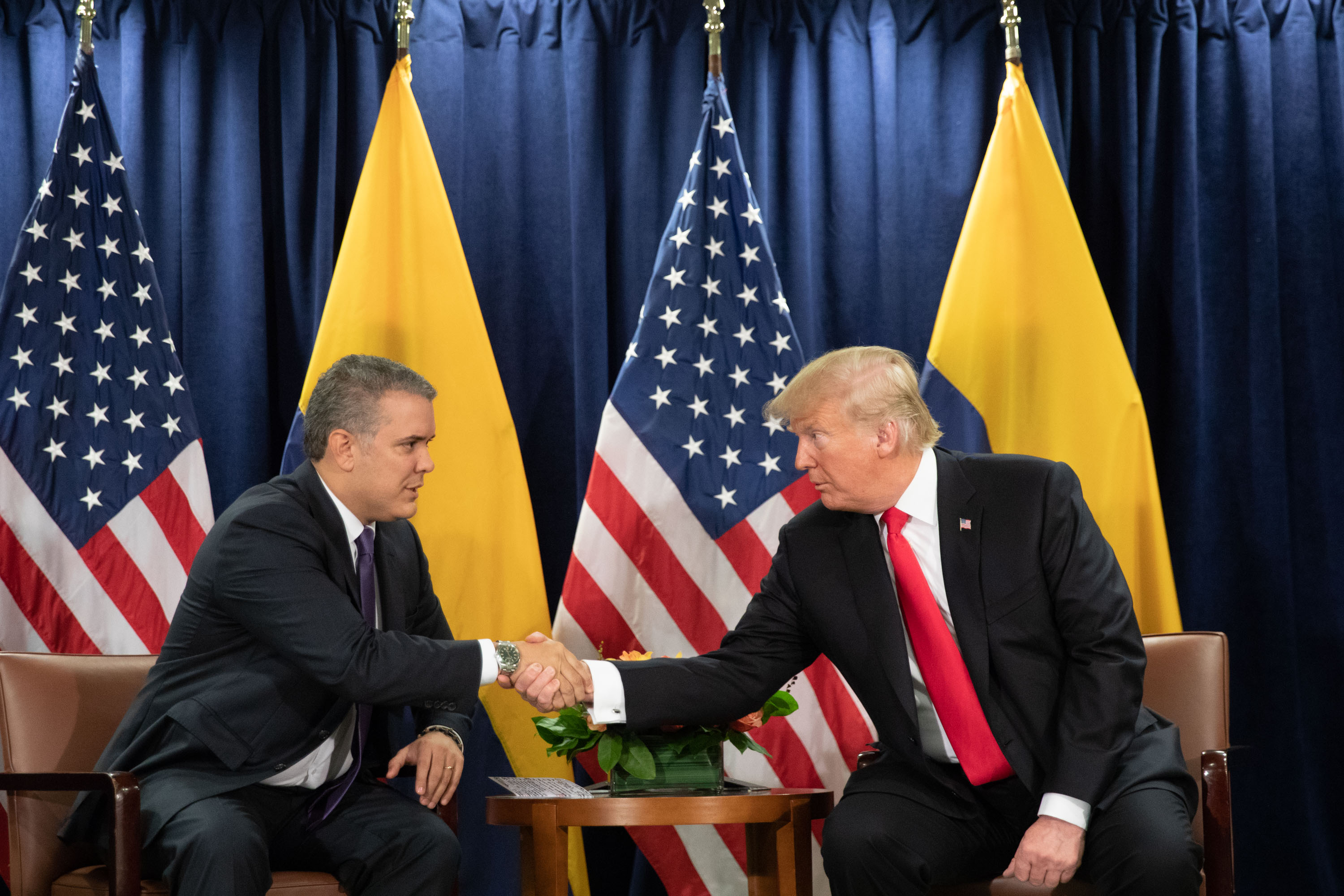

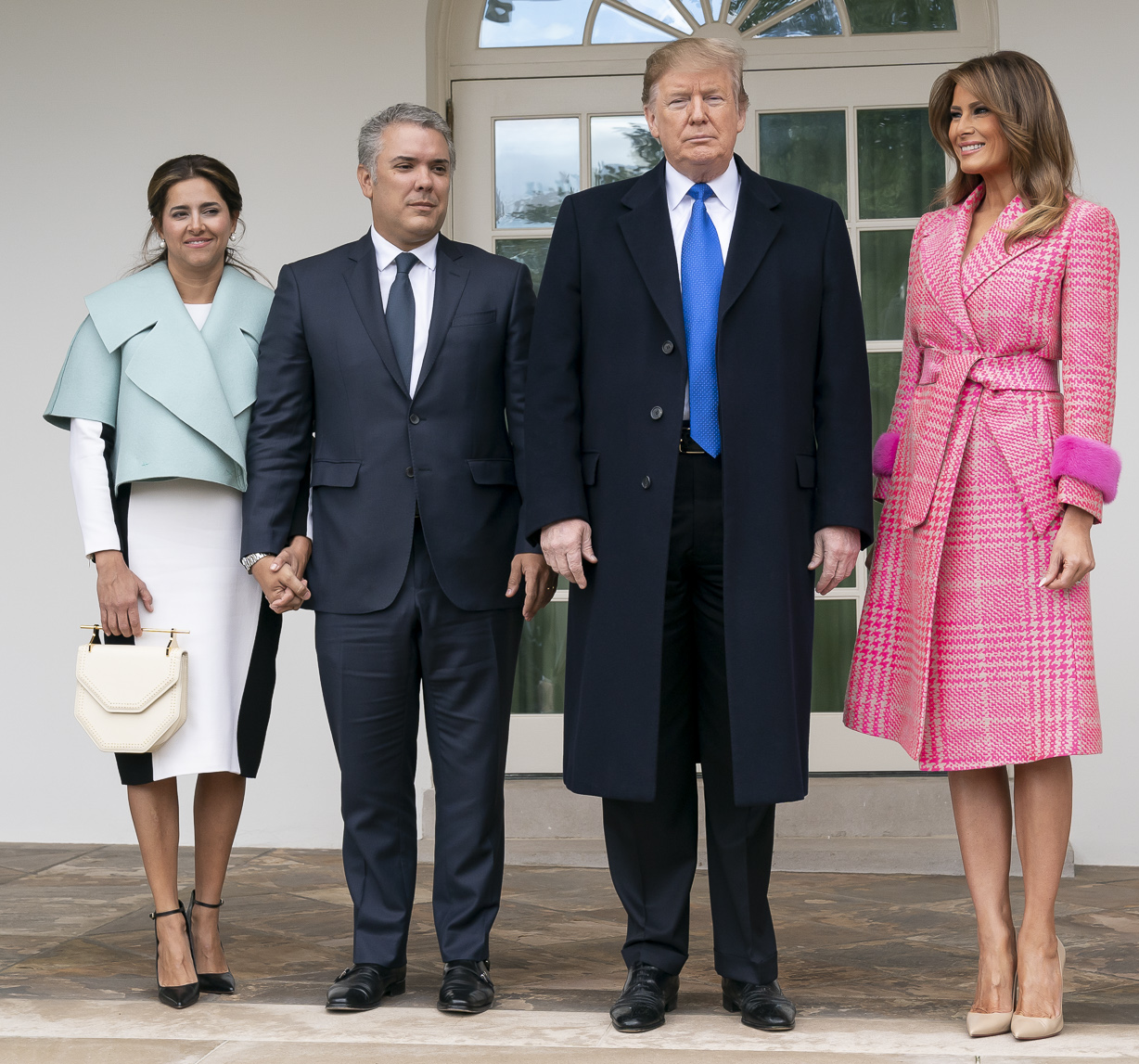

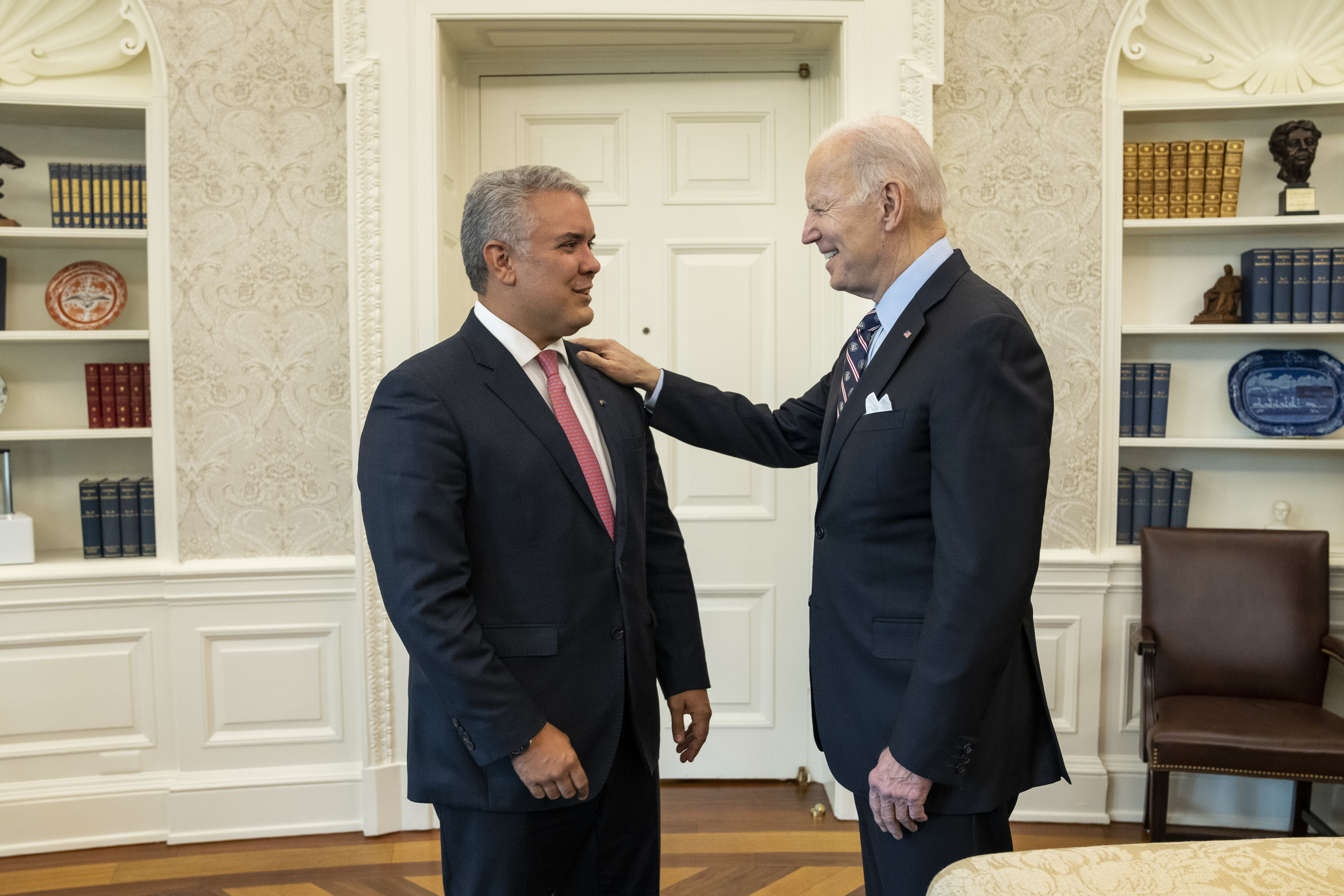

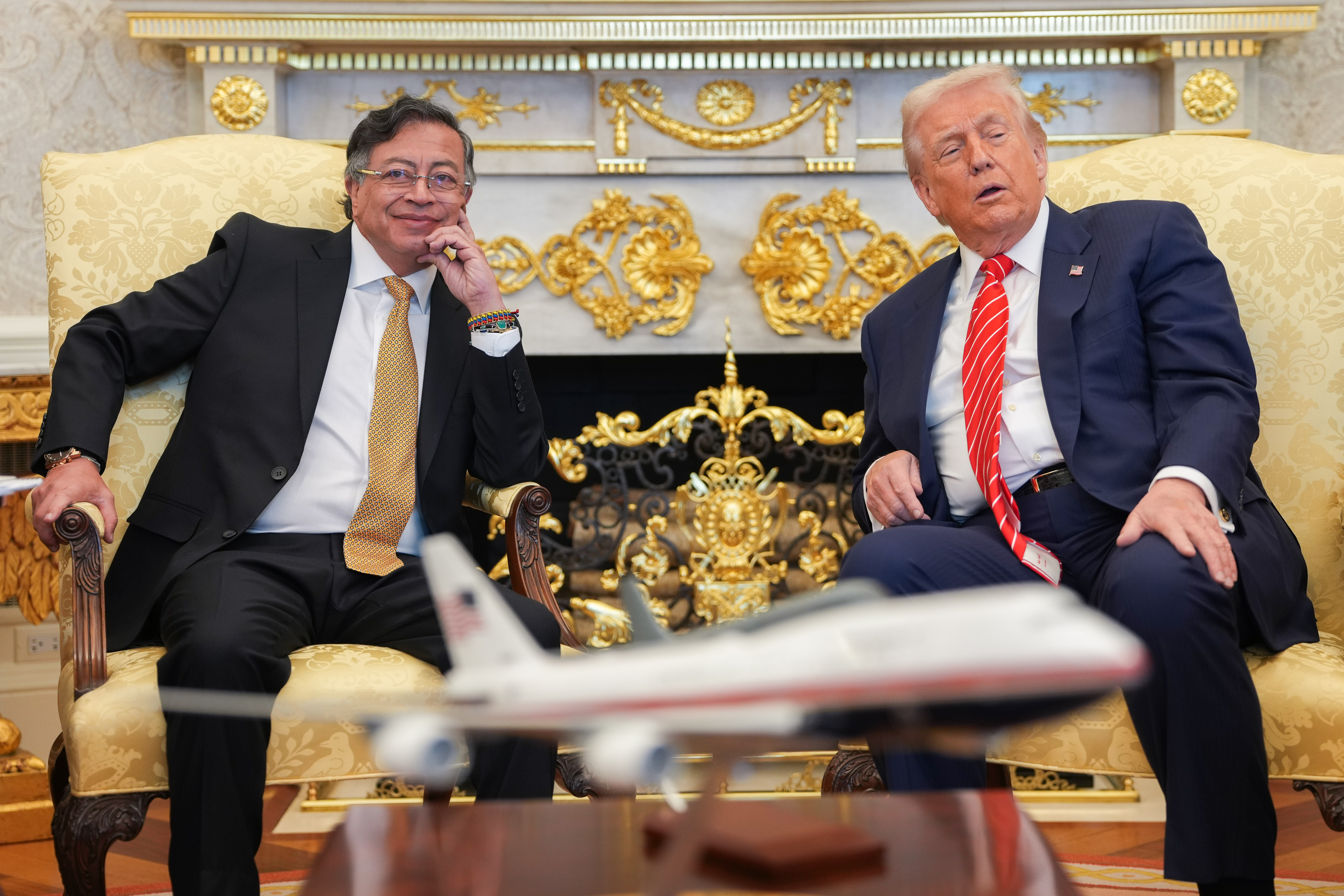

== Ecuador ==
Table of Trips
Start	End	Guest	Title	Reason
November 23, 1942	November 27, 1942	Carlos Alberto Arroyo del Río	President	Guest of U.S. Government on invitation of the President. In U.S. November 22 – December 1, visiting Detroit, Buffalo, New York City, and West Point
June 20, 1951	June 23, 1951	Galo Plaza	President	Guest of U.S. Government. Addressed U.S. Congress June 21. Afterwards visited New York City and San Francisco. Departed U.S. June 29.
July 23, 1962	July 24, 1962	Carlos Julio Arosemena Monroy	President	Official visit. In U.S. July 22–29, visiting Philadelphia, Chicago, and New York City.
September 6, 1977	September 9, 1977	Alfredo Ernesto Poveda Burbano	President	Attended signing of the Panama Canal Treaty.
July 20, 1979	July 20, 1979	Jaime Roldós Aguilera	President	Informal visit.
April 7, 1983	April 9, 1983	Osvaldo Hurtado Larrea	President	Official working visit.
June 25, 1984	June 26, 1984	León Febres Cordero Rivadeneira	President	Private visit. Met with President Reagan June 26.
January 12, 1986	January 16, 1986	León Febres Cordero Rivadeneira	President	State Visit. In U.S. January 16–18; visited Los Angeles.
July 22, 1990	July 24, 1990	Rodrigo Borja Cevallos	President	Official working visit.
January 30, 1992	January 30, 1992	Rodrigo Borja Cevallos	President	Met with President Bush while attending a U.N. Security Council Summit in New York City.
January 26, 1992	January 27, 1992	Rodrigo Borja Cevallos	President	Attended Drug Summit in San Antonio
July 28, 1992	July 28, 1992	Sixto Durán Ballén	President	Met with President Bush during a private visit.
December 9, 1994	December 11, 1994	Sixto Durán Ballén	President	Attended the Summit of the Americas in Miami
June 23, 1996	June 27, 1996	Sixto Durán Ballén	President	Met with President Clinton during a private visit.
October 9, 1998	October 9, 1998	Jamil Mahuad	President	Discussed the Ecuador-Peru border dispute with President Bill Clinton during a private visit.
February 3, 1999	February 6, 1999	Jamil Mahuad	President	Discussed implementation of Ecuador-Peru border agreement.
February 9, 2003	February 12, 2003	Lucio Gutierrez	President	Working visit.
February 12, 2020	February 12, 2020	Lenín Moreno	President	Working visit.
June 8, 2022	June 10, 2022	Guillermo Lasso	President	Attended the Summit of the Americas in Los Angeles, California.
December 19, 2022	December 19, 2022	Guillermo Lasso	President	Working visit.
November 3, 2023	November 3, 2023	Guillermo Lasso	President	Attended the APEP Leaders' Summit.

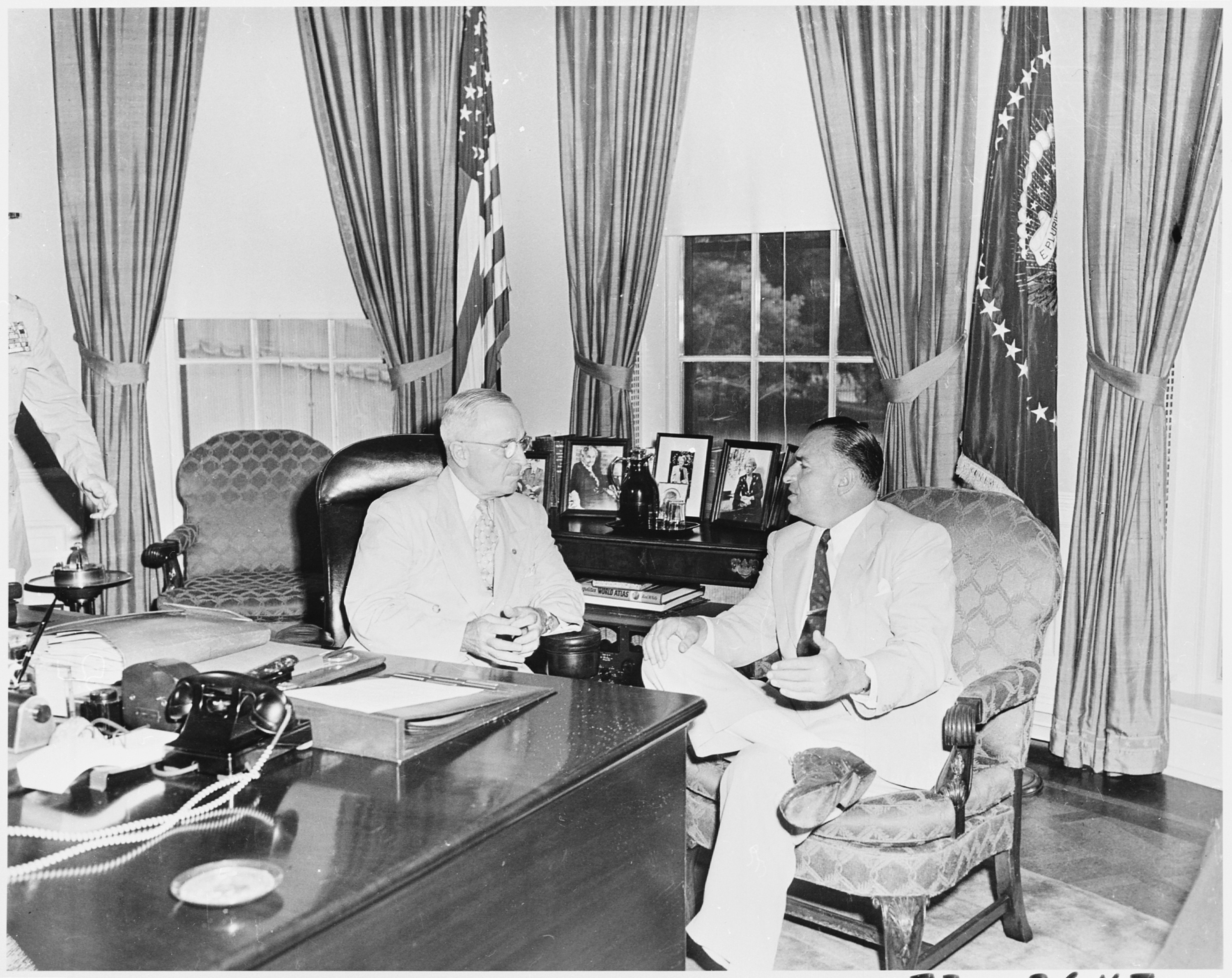

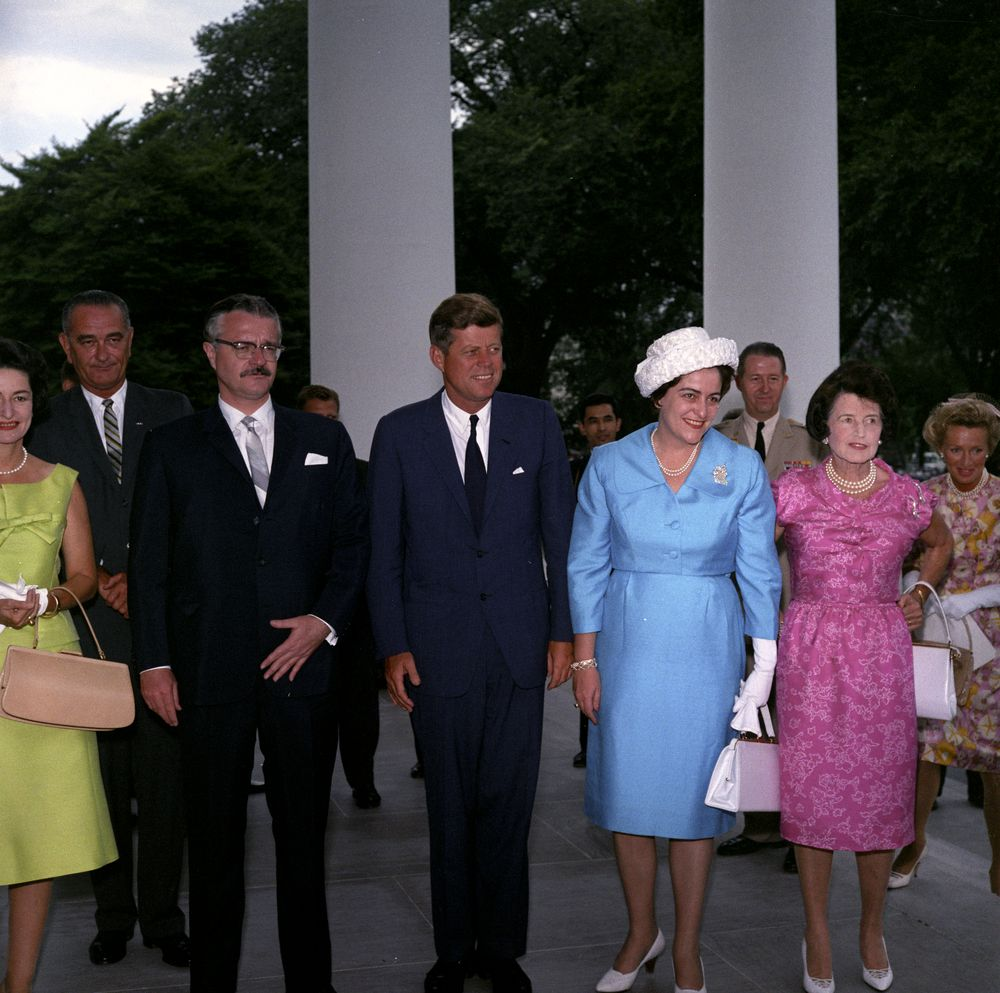

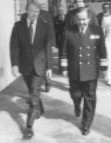

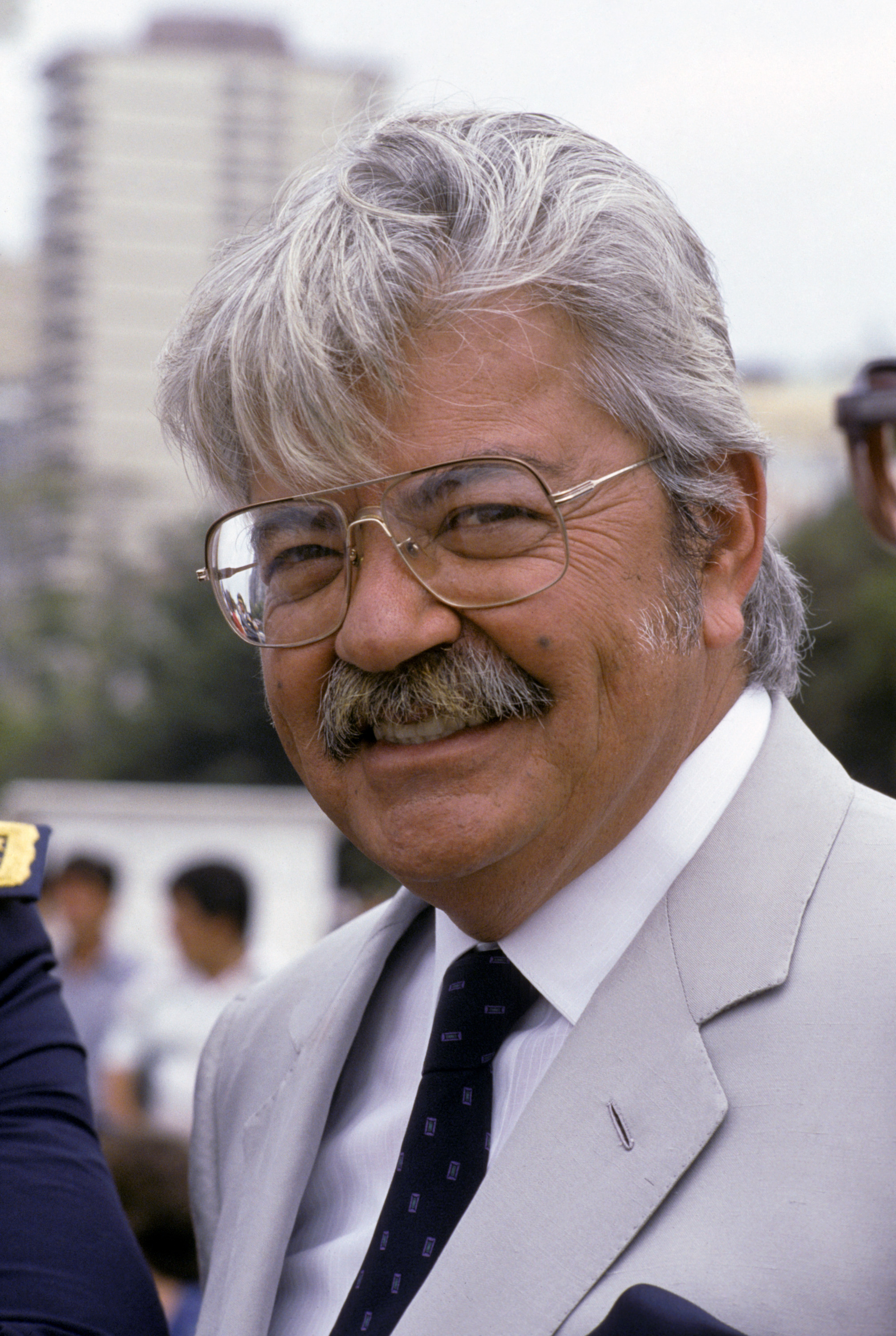

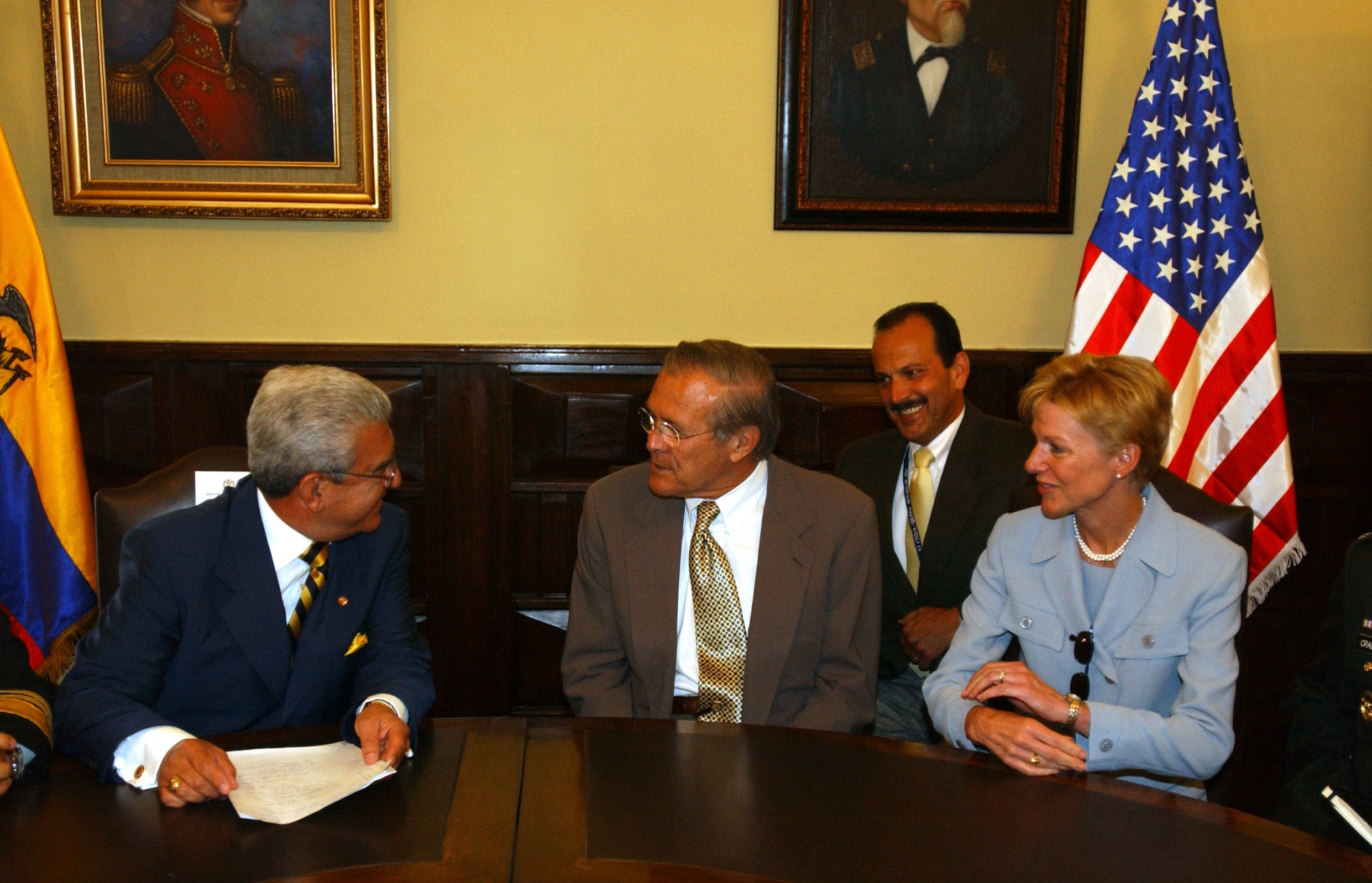

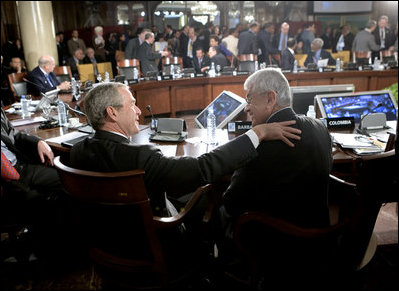

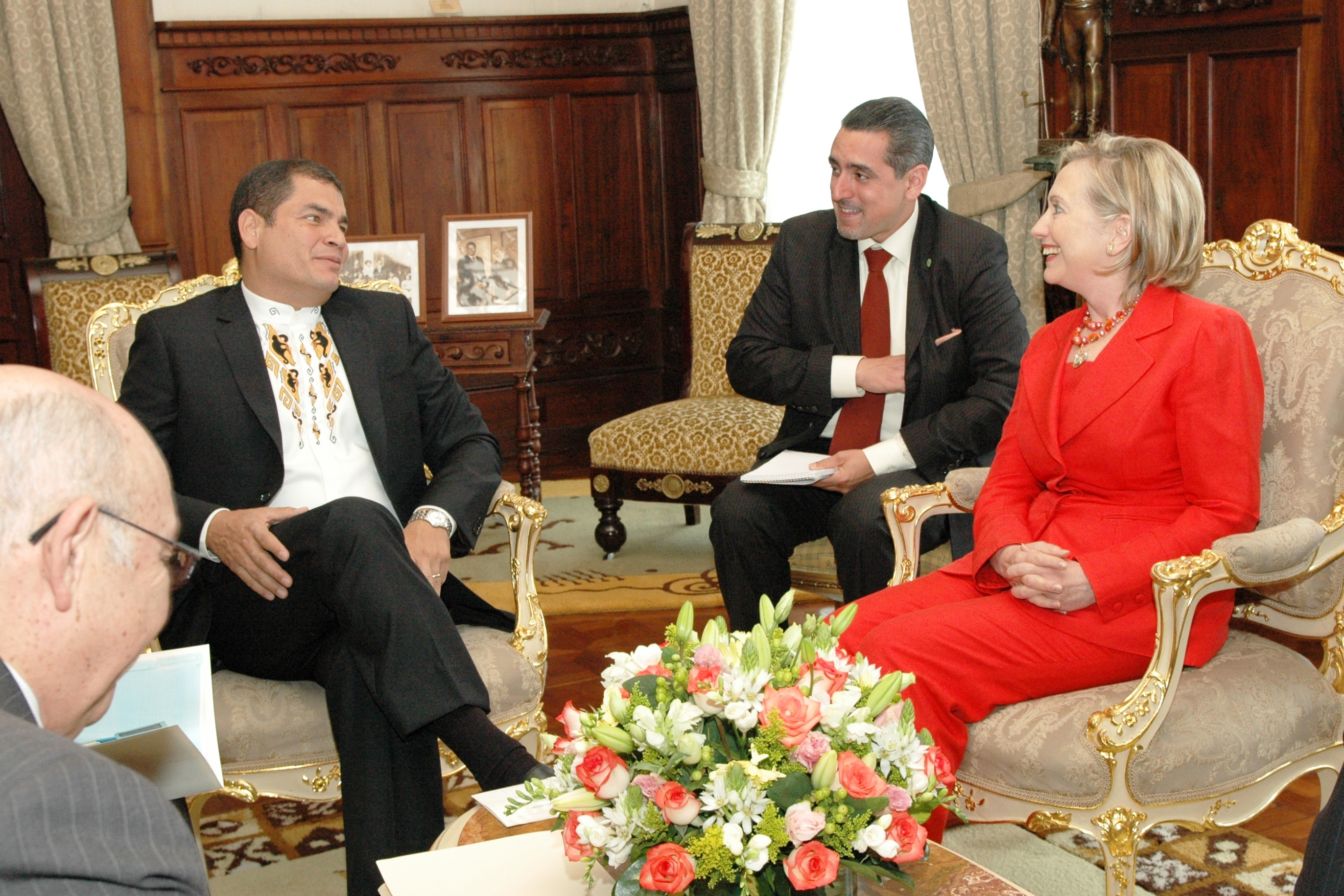

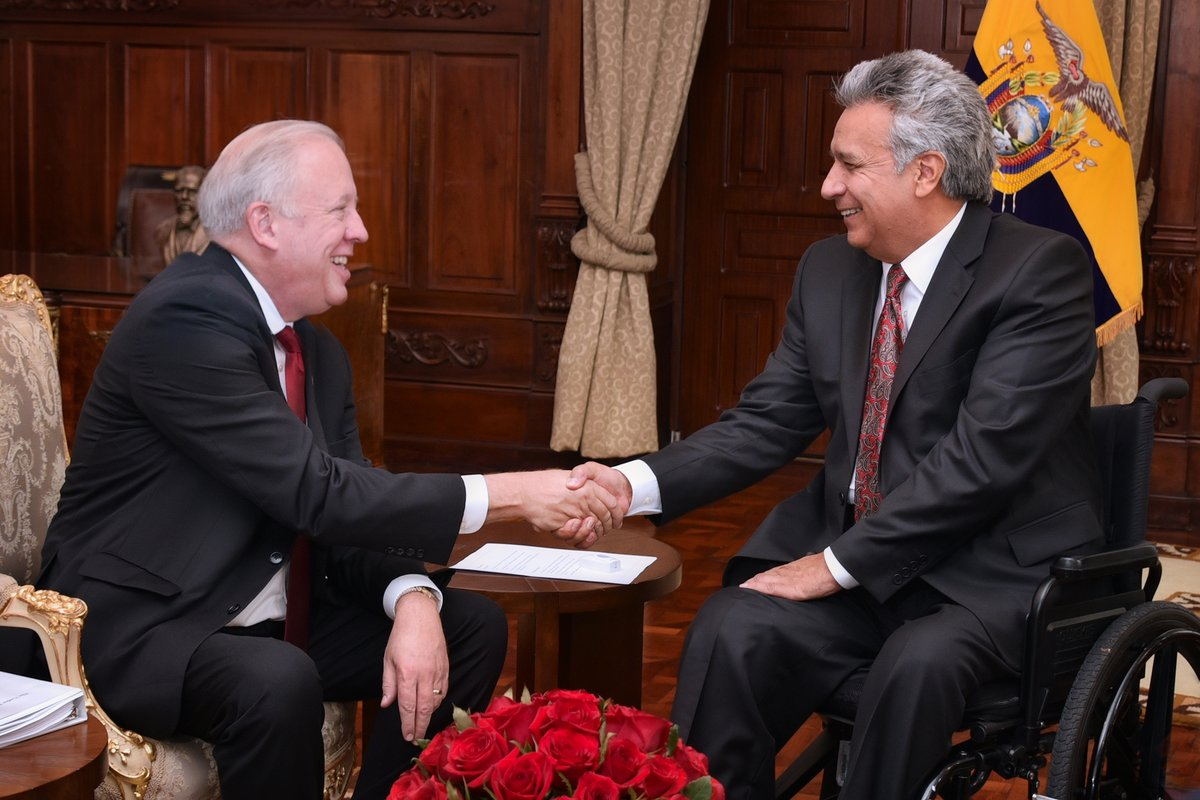

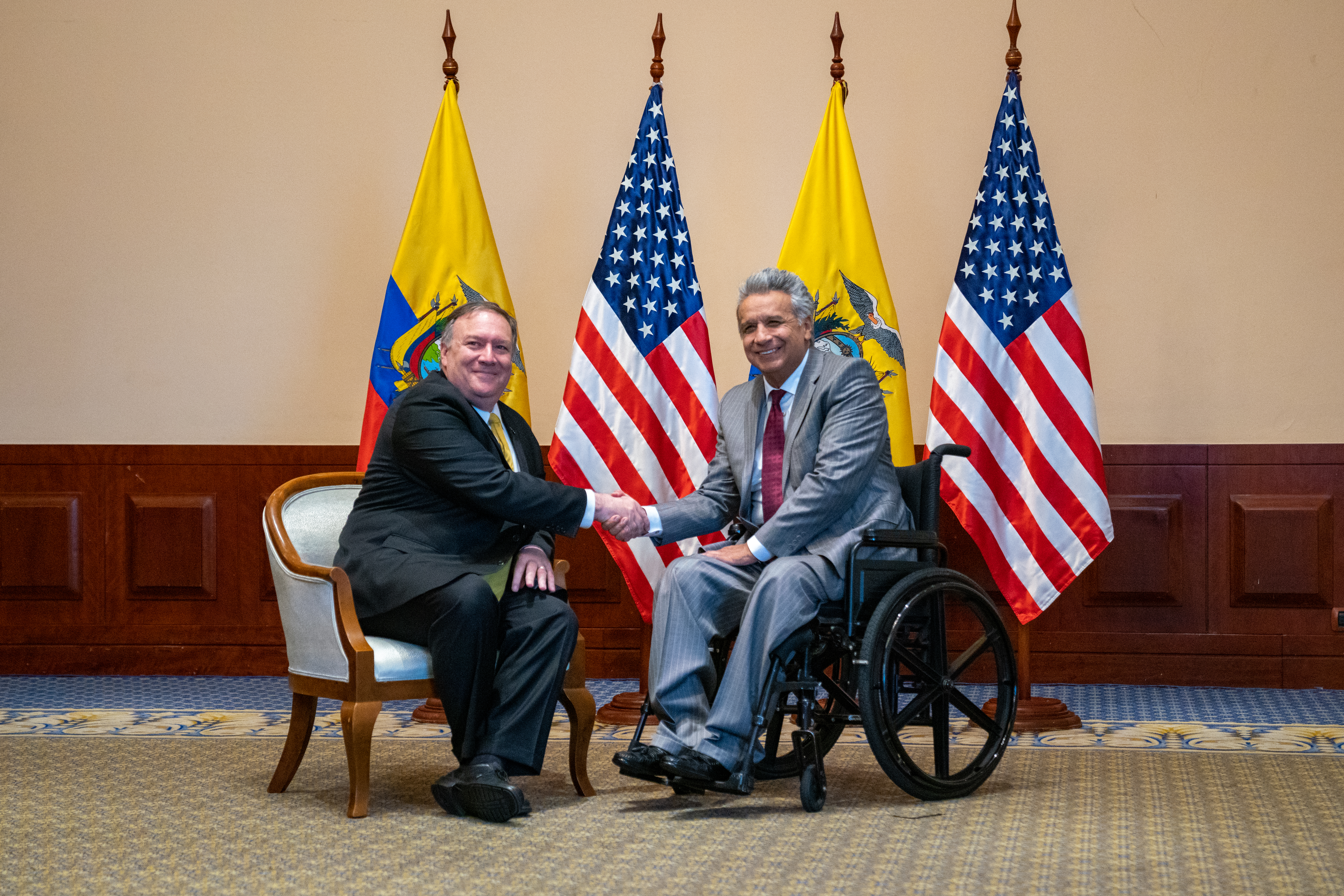

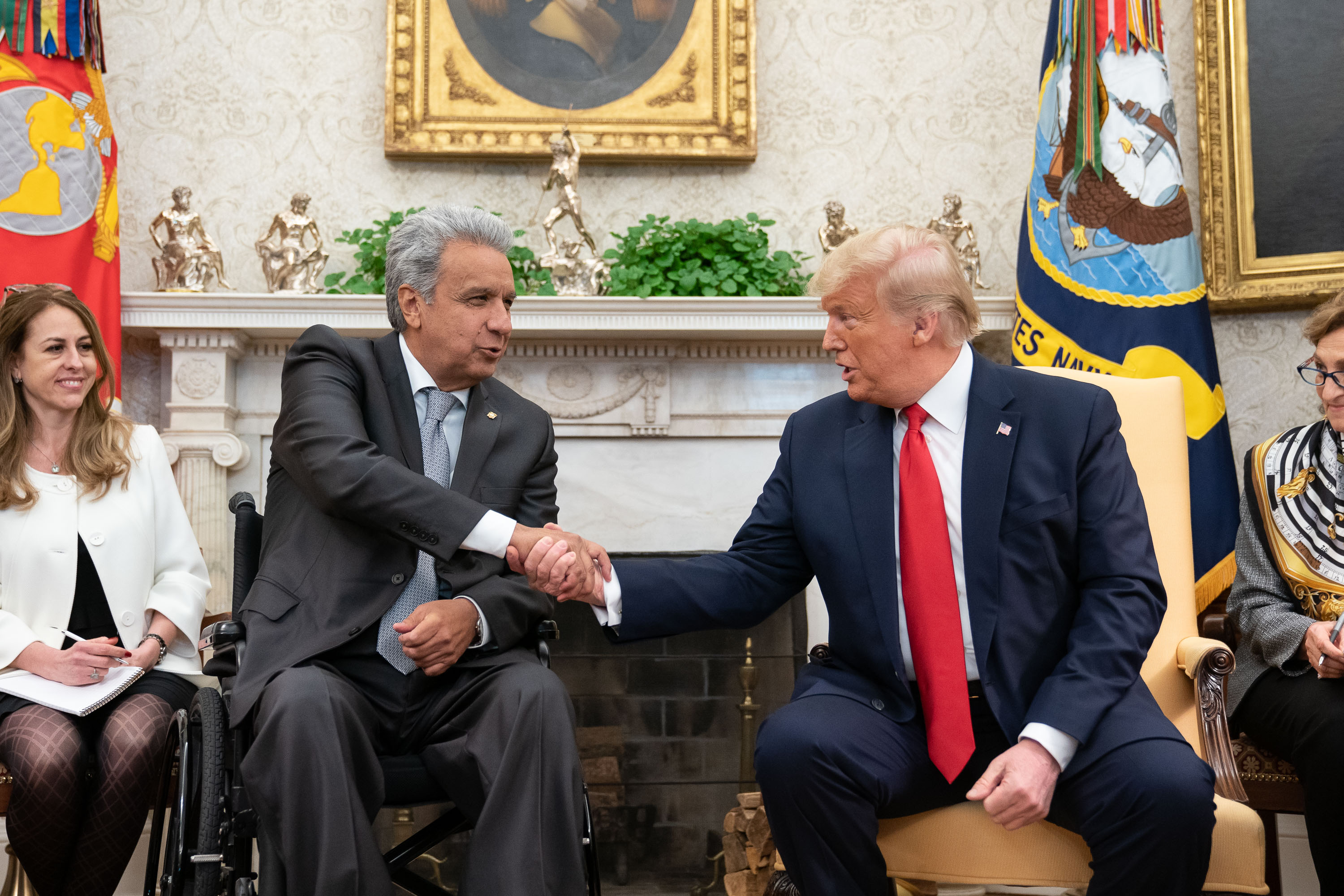

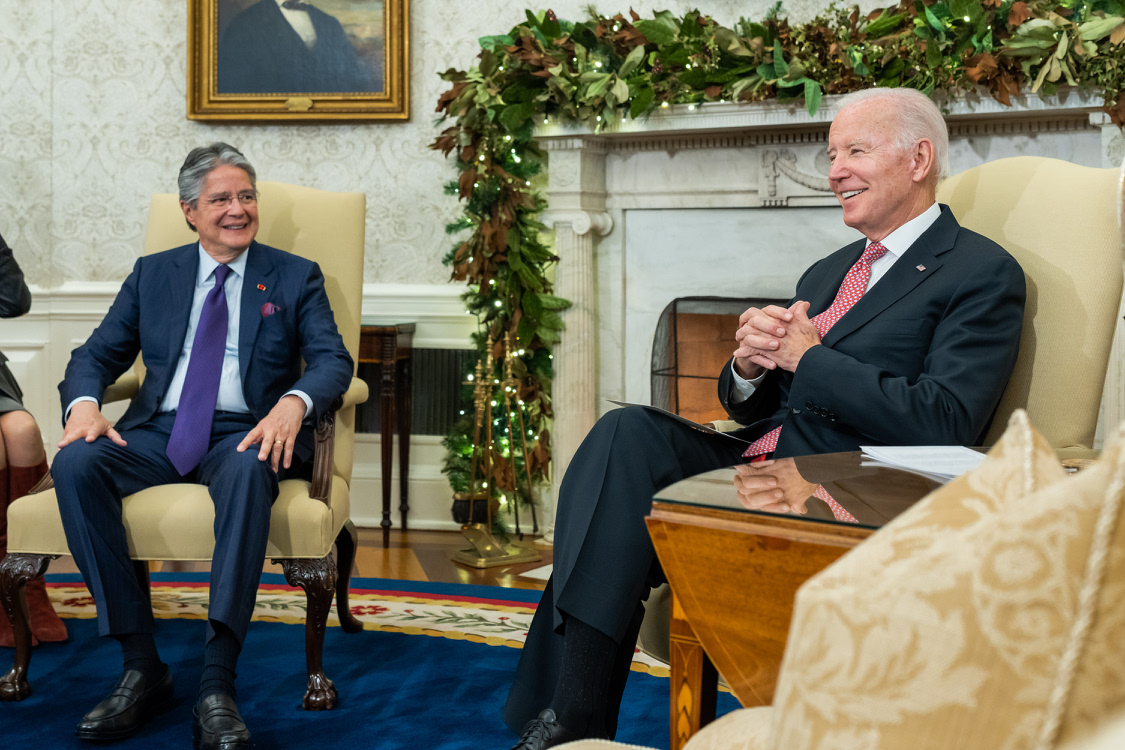

== Guyana ==
Table of Trips
Start	End	Guest	Title	Reason
July 21, 1966	July 23, 1966	Forbes Burnham	Prime Minister	Informal visit. Afterwards visited San Francisco, Los Angeles, Houston, and Austin. Departed U.S. July 30.
July 26, 1968	July 26, 1968	Forbes Burnham	Prime Minister	Informal visit.
September 13, 1988	September 13, 1988	Desmond Hoyte	President	Discussed bilateral relations and trade preferences under the Caribbean Basin Initiative.
June 19, 1989	June 19, 1989	Desmond Hoyte	President	Met with President Bush during a private visit
August 30, 1993	August 30, 1993	Cheddi Jagan	President	Attended a CARICOM working luncheon.
December 9, 1994	December 11, 1994	Cheddi Jagan	President	Attended the Summit of the Americas in Miami
September 24, 2003	September 24, 2003	Bharrat Jagdeo	President	Met with President Bush at the UN General Assembly in New York City.
June 8, 2022	June 10, 2022	Irfaan Ali	President	Attended the Summit of the Americas in Los Angeles, California.

== Paraguay ==
Table of Trips
Start	End	Guest	Title	Reason
June 9, 1943	June 13, 1943	Higinio Moríñigo	President	Guest of U.S. Government on invitation of the President. In the U.S. June 8–26, visited Detroit, Buffalo, and New York City. Addressed U.S. Congress June 10.
March 20, 1968	March 22, 1968	Alfredo Stroessner	President	Official visit. In U.S. March 19–23; visited Williamsburg and New York City.
September 6, 1977	September 9, 1977	Alfredo Stroessner	President	Attended signing of the Panama Canal Treaty.
June 15, 1990	June 15, 1990	Andrés Rodríguez Pedotti	President	Private visit.
December 9, 1994	December 11, 1994	Juan Carlos Wasmosy	President	Attended the Summit of the Americas in Miami
September 26, 2003	September 26, 2003	Nicanor Duarte Frutos	President	Working visit.
September 24, 2008	September 24, 2008	Fernando Lugo	President	Met with President Bush at the Council of the Americas in New York City.
October 29, 2008	October 29, 2008	Fernando Lugo	President	Working visit.
December 12, 2019	December 15, 2019	Mario Abdo Benítez	President	Working visit.
June 8, 2022	June 10, 2022	Mario Abdo Benítez	President	Attended the Summit of the Americas in Los Angeles, California.
February 19, 2026	February 19, 2026	Santiago Peña		To attend the first meeting of the Board of Peace.

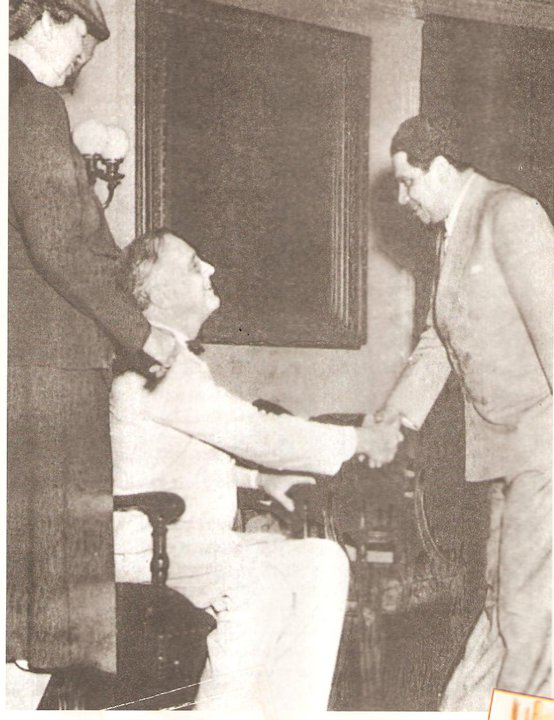

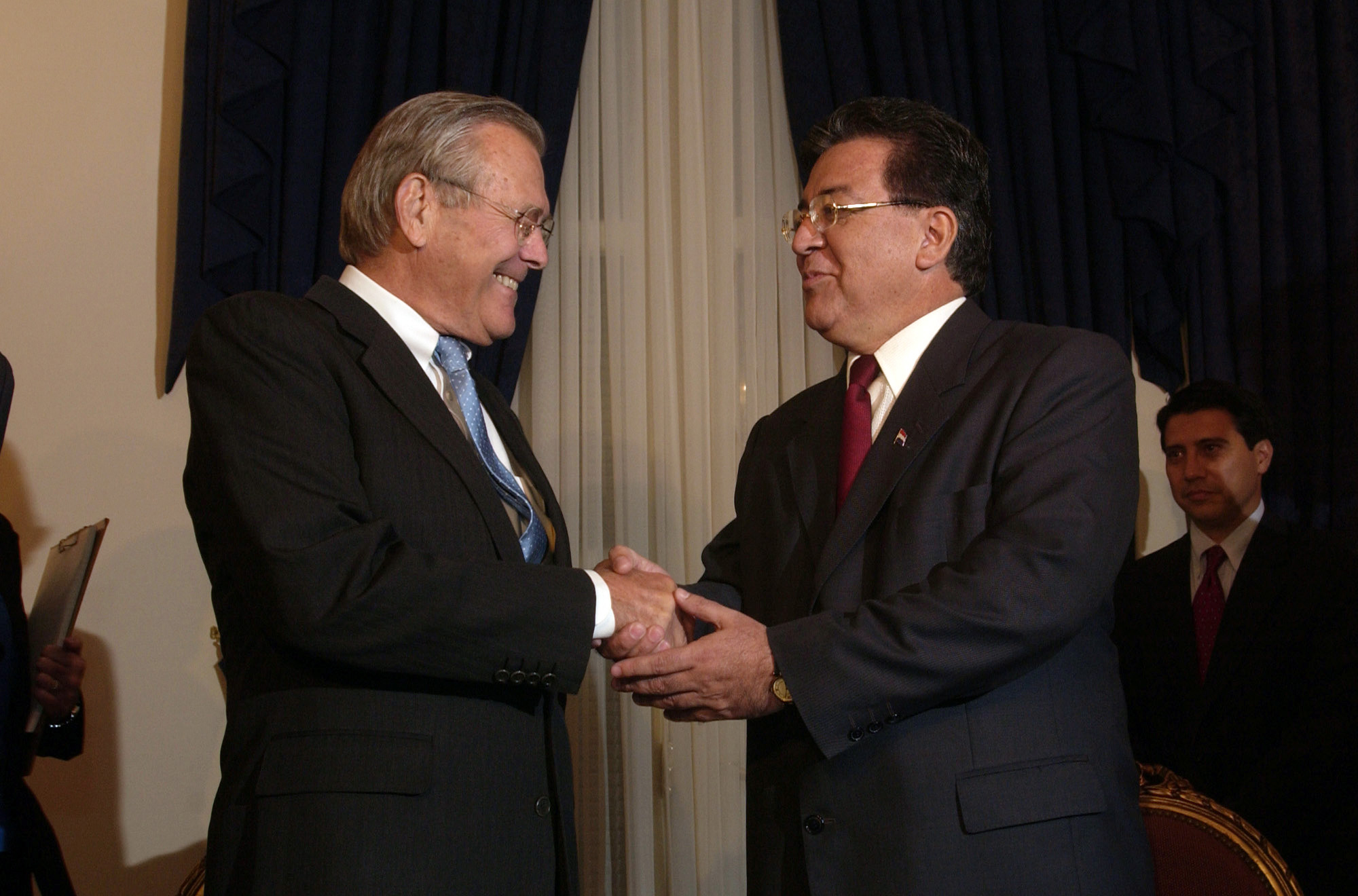

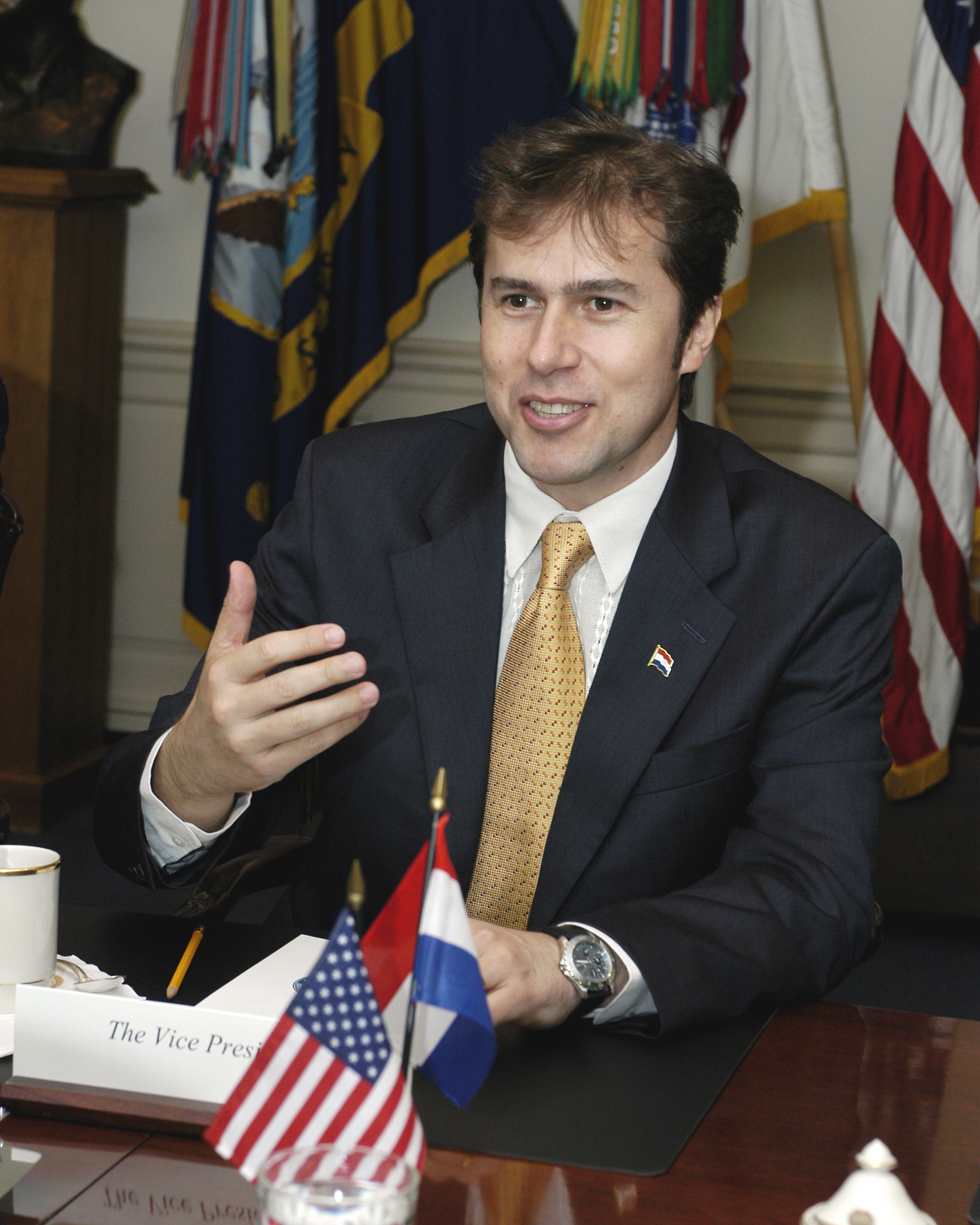

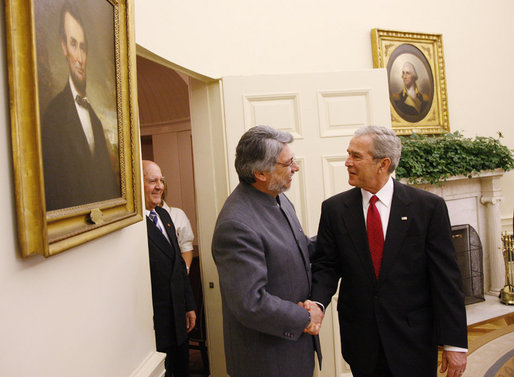

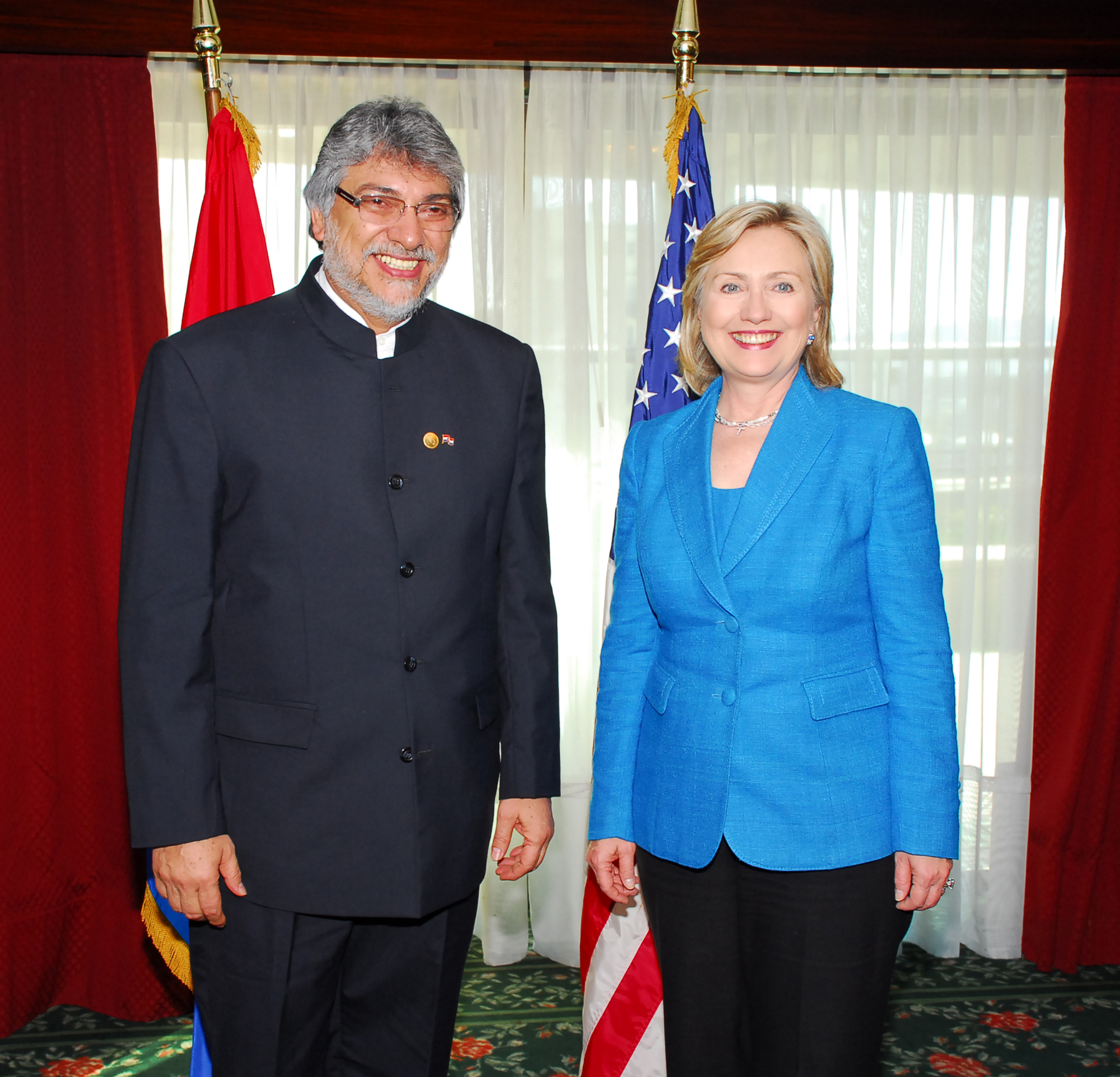

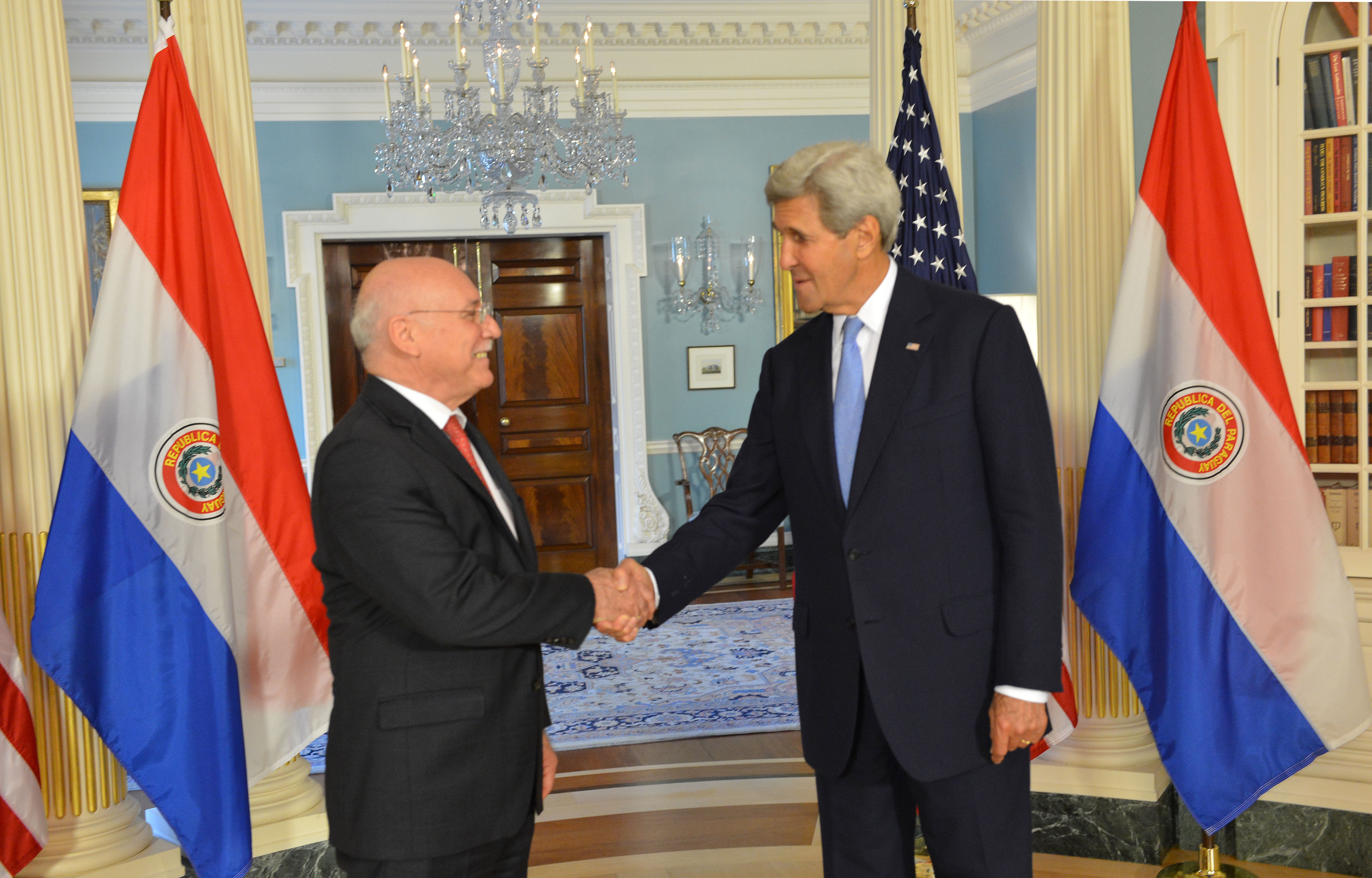

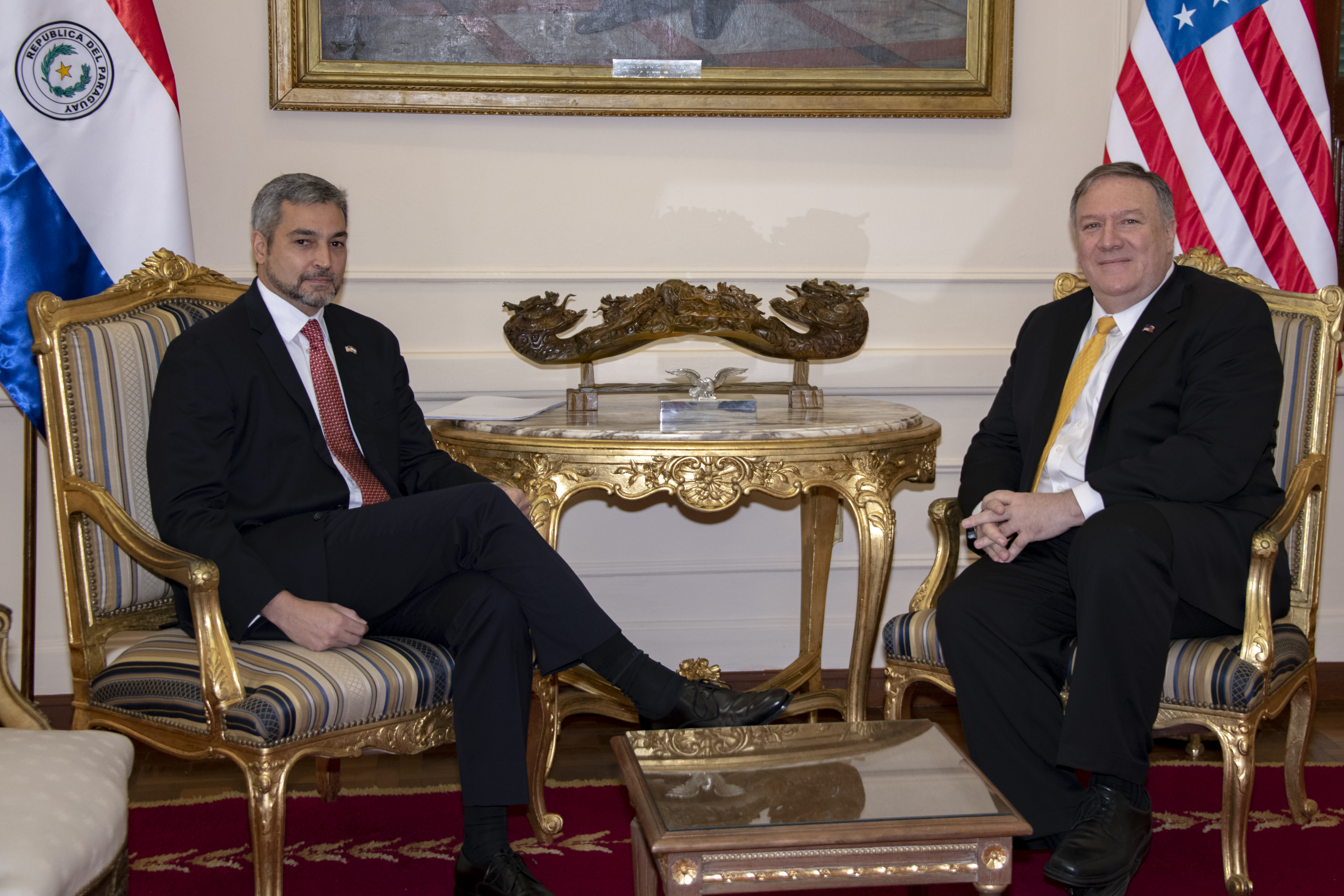

== Peru ==
Table of Trips
Start	End	Guest	Title	Reason
May 7, 1942	May 11, 1942	Manuel Prado Ugarteche	President	Guest of U.S. Government on invitation of the President. In U.S. May 5–22, visiting Miami, Annapolis, West Point, Detroit, Buffalo, Boston, and New York City.
September 19, 1961	September 22, 1961	Manuel Prado Ugarteche	President	State visit. Addressed U.S. Congress September 21. In U.S. September 18–29, visiting Miami, Williamsburg, New York City, Boston and Chicago.
October 24, 1970	October 24, 1970	Ernesto Montagne Sánchez	Prime Minister	Attended White House dinner on 25th Anniversary of the U.N.
September 6, 1977	September 9, 1977	Francisco Morales Bermúdez	President	Attended signing of the Panama Canal Treaty.
September 25, 1984	September 27, 1984	Fernando Belaunde Terry	President	Private visit. Accompanied by Prime Minister Mariategui. Met with President Reagan September 27.
September 16, 1991	September 19, 1991	Alberto Fujimori	President	Official working visit. Private visit to New York City afterward.
February 26, 1992	February 27, 1992	Alberto Fujimori	President	Attended Drug Summit in San Antonio.
December 9, 1994	December 11, 1994	Alberto Fujimori	President	Attended the Summit of the Americas in Miami
May 18, 1996	May 21, 1996	Alberto Fujimori	President	Met with President Clinton during a private visit.
February 3, 1997	February 3, 1997	Alberto Fujimori	President	Arrived in Washington, D.C. February to attend international meeting on small business lending. Discussed Lima hostage crisis with President Bill Clinton.
October 9, 1998	October 9, 1998	Alberto Fujimori	President	Discussed the Ecuador-Peru border dispute with President Bill Clinton during a private visit.
February 4, 1999	February 5, 1999	Alberto Fujimori	President	Discussed implementation of Ecuador-Peru border agreement.
June 25, 2001	June 27, 2001	Alejandro Toledo	President	Met with President Bush June 26 during a private visit.
September 10, 2002	September 16, 2002	Alejandro Toledo	President	Private visit. Addressed OAS Meeting.
March 8, 2006	March 10, 2006	Alejandro Toledo	President	Working
April 22, 2006	April 24, 2006	Alan Garcia	President	Working
July 9, 2006	July 12, 2006	Alejandro Toledo	President	Met with President Bush July 11 during a private visit.
October 9, 2006	October 10, 2006	Alan Garcia	President	Working visit.
December 13, 2007	December 14, 2007	Alan Garcia	President	Working visit.
September 24, 2008	September 24, 2008	Alan Garcia	President	Met with President Bush at the Council of the Americas in New York City.
June 1, 2010	June 1, 2010	Alan Garcia	President	Working visit.
July 6, 2011	July 6, 2011	Ollanta Humala	President	Working visit.
November 10, 2011	November 13, 2011	Ollanta Humala	President	Attended the Asia-Pacific Economic and Cooperation Summit at Honolulu and Kapolei, Hawaii.
June 10, 2013	June 12, 2013	Ollanta Humala	President	Official Working Visit.
February 24, 2017	February 24, 2017	Pedro Pablo Kuczynski	President	Official Working Visit.
June 8, 2022	June 10, 2022	Pedro Castillo	President	Attended the Summit of the Americas in Los Angeles, California.
November 3, 2023	November 3, 2023	Dina Boluarte	President	Attended the APEP Leaders' Summit.
November 12, 2023	November 17, 2023	Dina Boluarte	President	Attended the APEC Leaders' Summit at San Francisco, California.

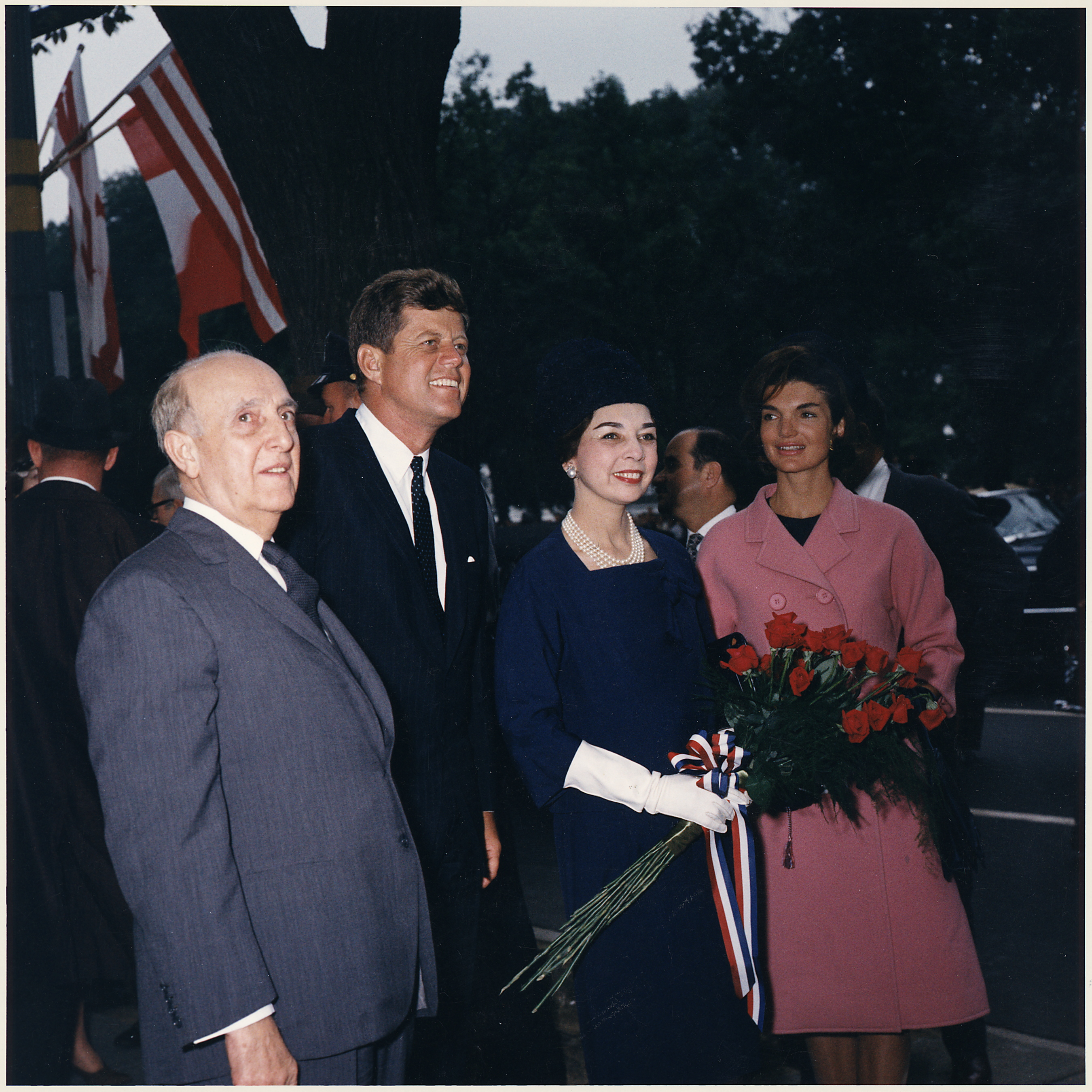

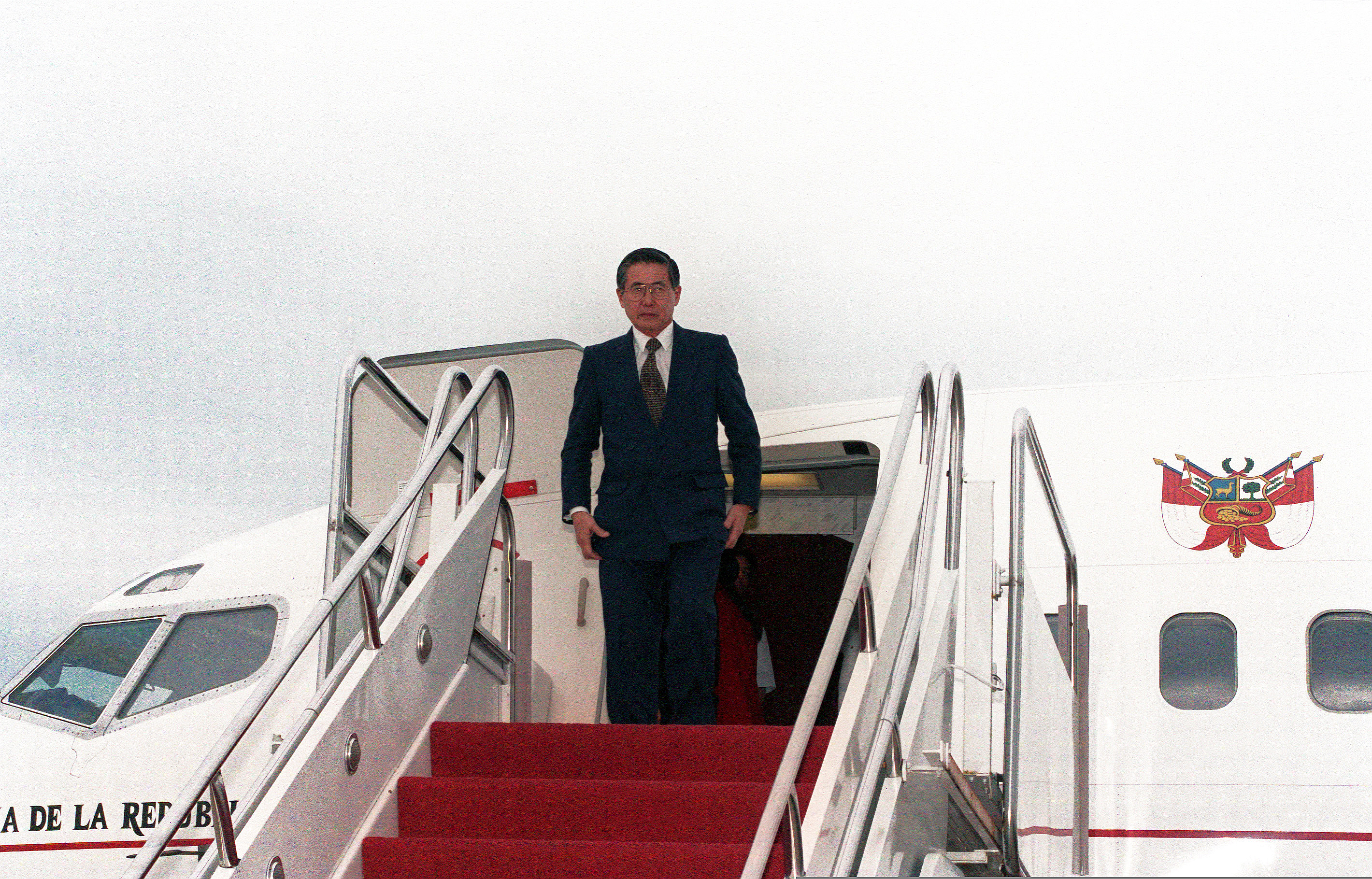

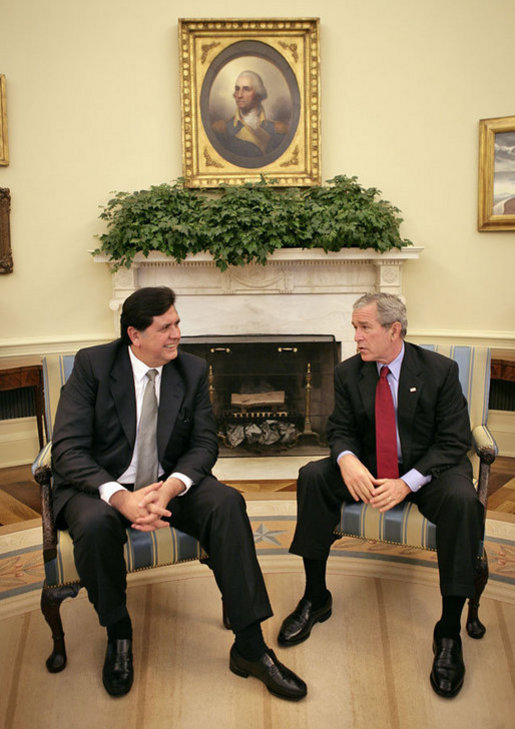

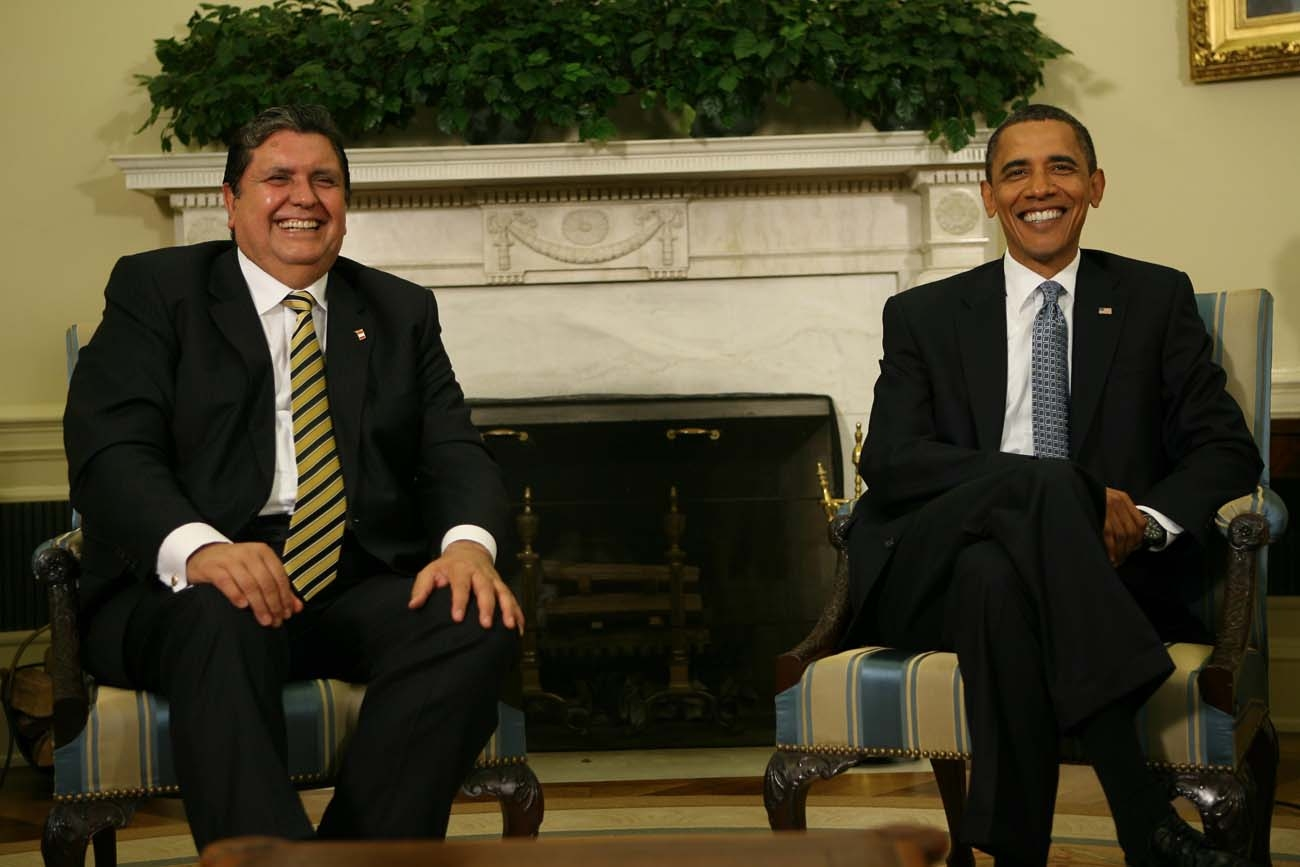

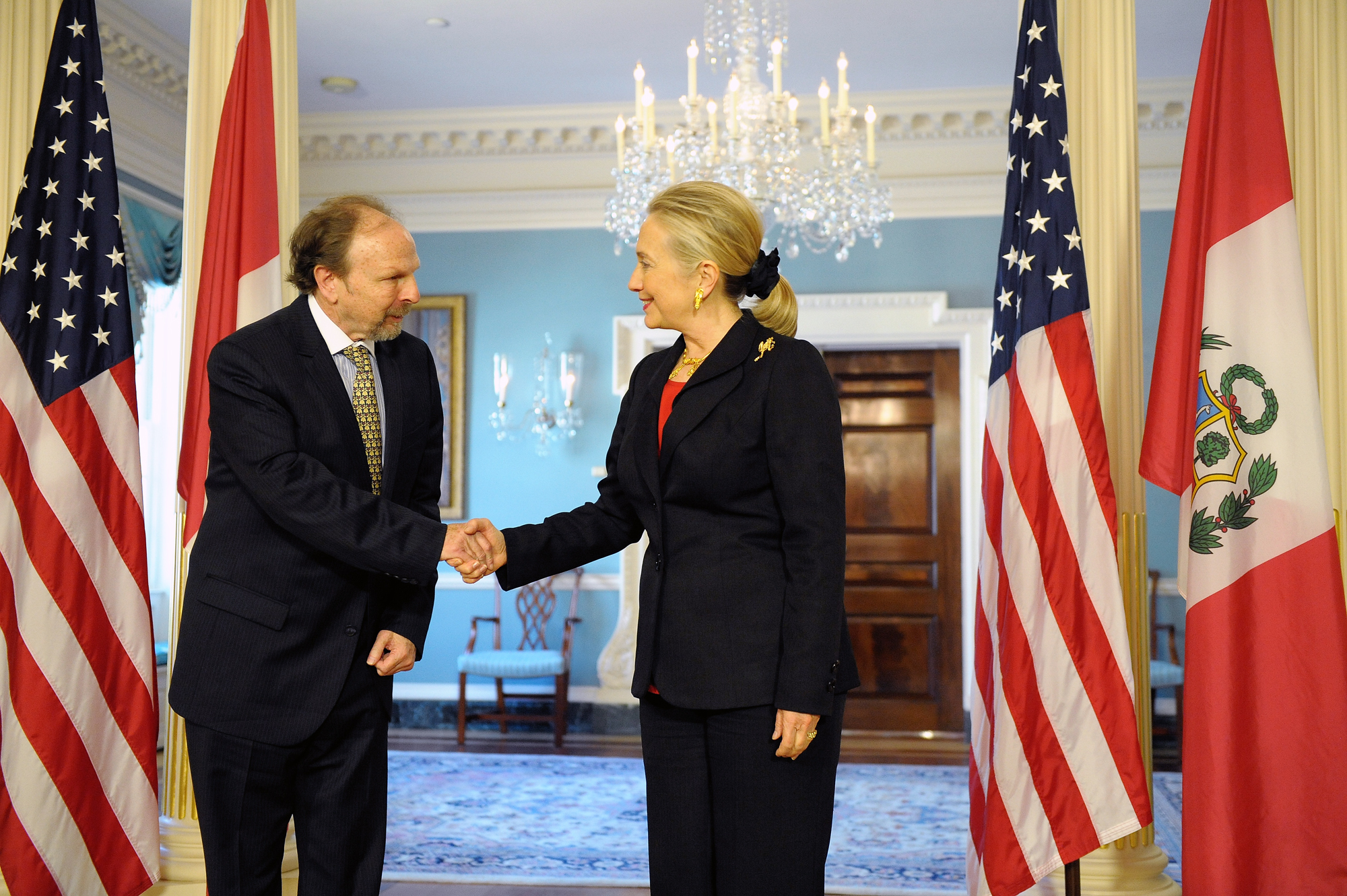

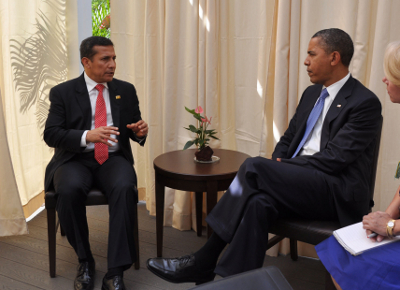

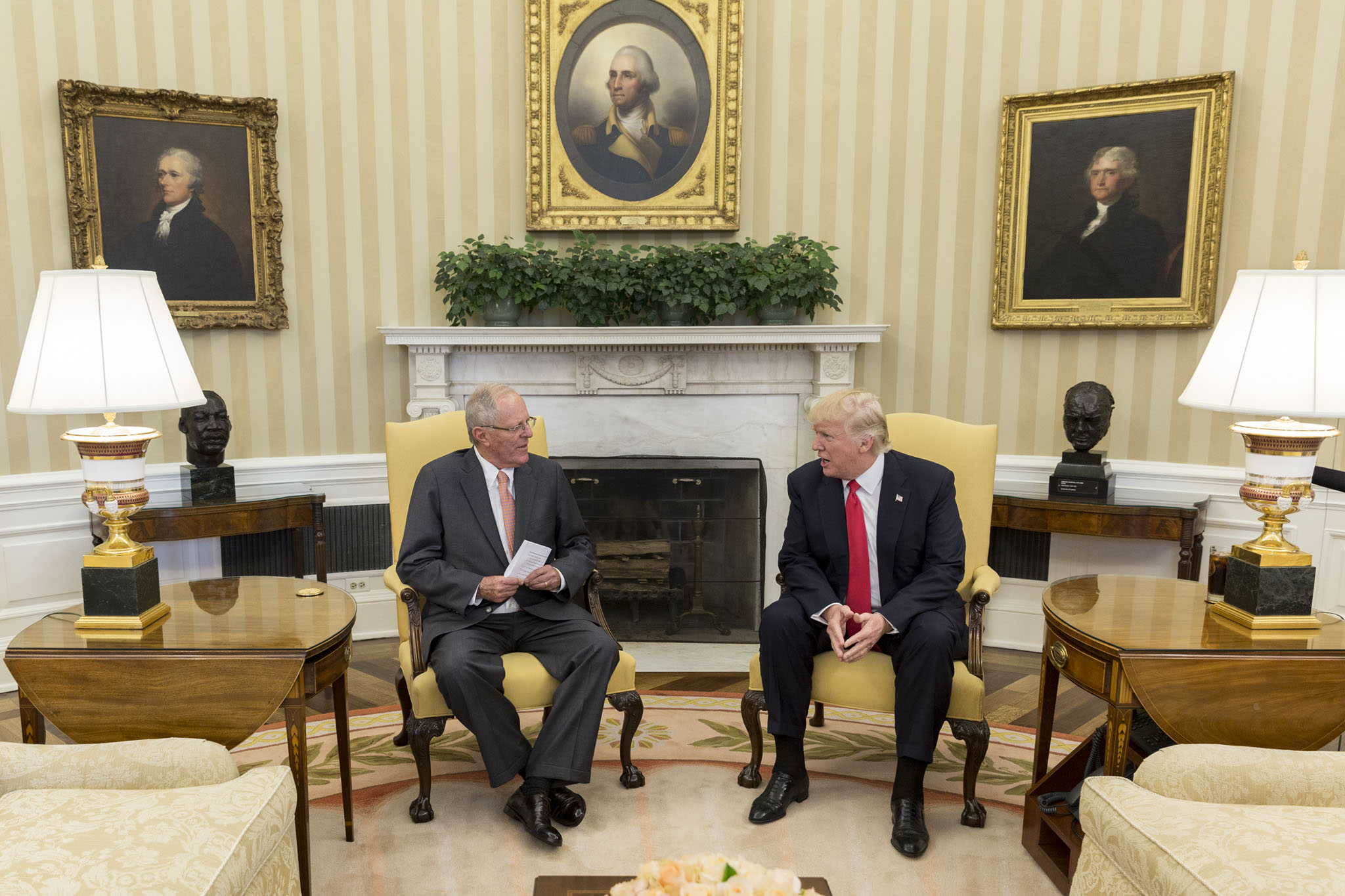

== Suriname ==
Table of Trips
Start	End	Guest	Title	Reason
February 3, 1992	February 3, 1992	Ronald Venetiaan	President	Met with President Bush during a private visit.
December 9, 1994	December 11, 1994	Ronald Venetiaan	President	Attended the Summit of the Americas in Miami
June 8, 2022	June 10, 2022	Chan Santokhi	President	Attended the Summit of the Americas in Los Angeles, California.

== Uruguay ==
Table of Trips
Start	End	Guest	Title	Reason
February 11, 1947	February 15, 1947	Tomás Berreta	President	Guest of U.S. Government. In the U.S. February 4–18, visiting Miami, New York City, and Philadelphia.
December 5, 1955	December 8, 1955	Luis Batlle Berres	President	Official visit. Afterwards visited New York City, Boston, Chicago, and Miami. Departed U.S. December 17.
September 6, 1977	September 9, 1977	Aparicio Méndez	President	Attended signing of the Panama Canal Treaty.
June 16, 1986	June 19, 1986	Julio Maria Sanguinetti	President	State Visit; visited New York City June 19–20.
September 15, 1989	September 15, 1989	Julio Maria Sanguinetti	President	Met with President Bush during a private visit.
February 5, 1990	February 5, 1990	Luis Alberto Lacalle	President	Private visit.
October 1, 1990	October 1, 1990	Luis Alberto Lacalle	President	Met with President Bush at the U.N. General Assembly.
May 20, 1991	May 21, 1991	Luis Alberto Lacalle	President	Met with President Bush during a private visit.
March 12, 1994	March 13, 1994	Luis Alberto Lacalle	President	Met with President Clinton during a private visit.
November 9, 1994	November 11, 1994	Luis Alberto Lacalle	President	Attended the Summit of the Americas in Miami
July 23, 1998	July 23, 1998	Julio Maria Sanguinetti	President	Working visit.
February 11, 2002	February 16, 2002	Jorge Batlle	President	Working visit.
April 23, 2003	April 23, 2003	Jorge Batlle	President	Working visit.
April 29, 2006	May 4, 2006	Tabaré Vázquez	President	Working visit.
May 12, 2014	May 12, 2014	José Mujica	President	Working visit.
June 8, 2022	June 10, 2022	Luis Lacalle Pou	President	Attended the Summit of the Americas in Los Angeles, California.
June 13, 2023	June 13, 2023	Luis Lacalle Pou	President	Working visit.
November 3, 2023	November 3, 2023	Luis Lacalle Pou	President	Attended the APEP Leaders' Summit.

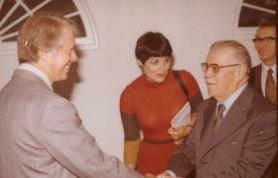

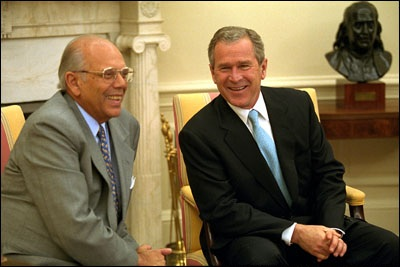

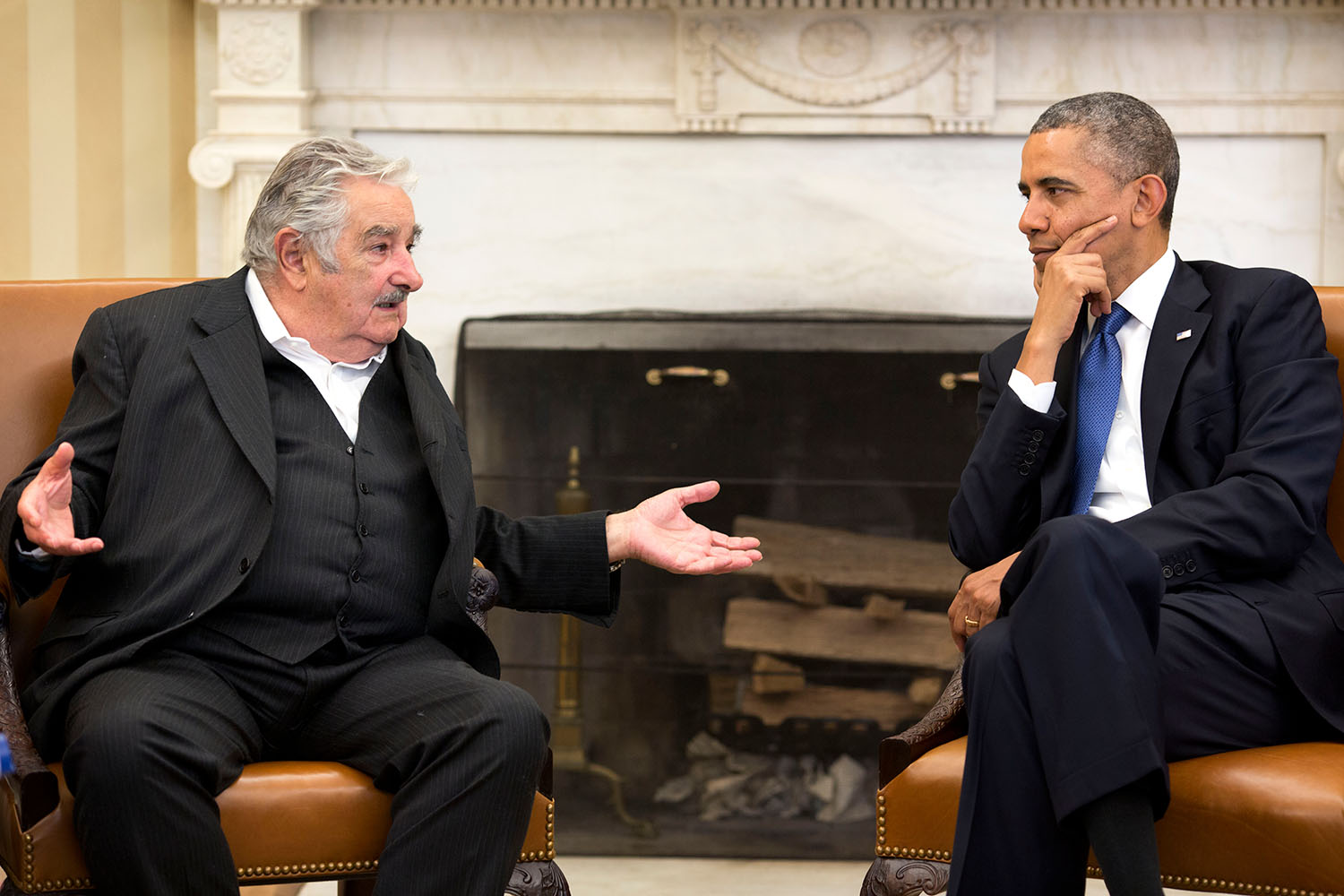

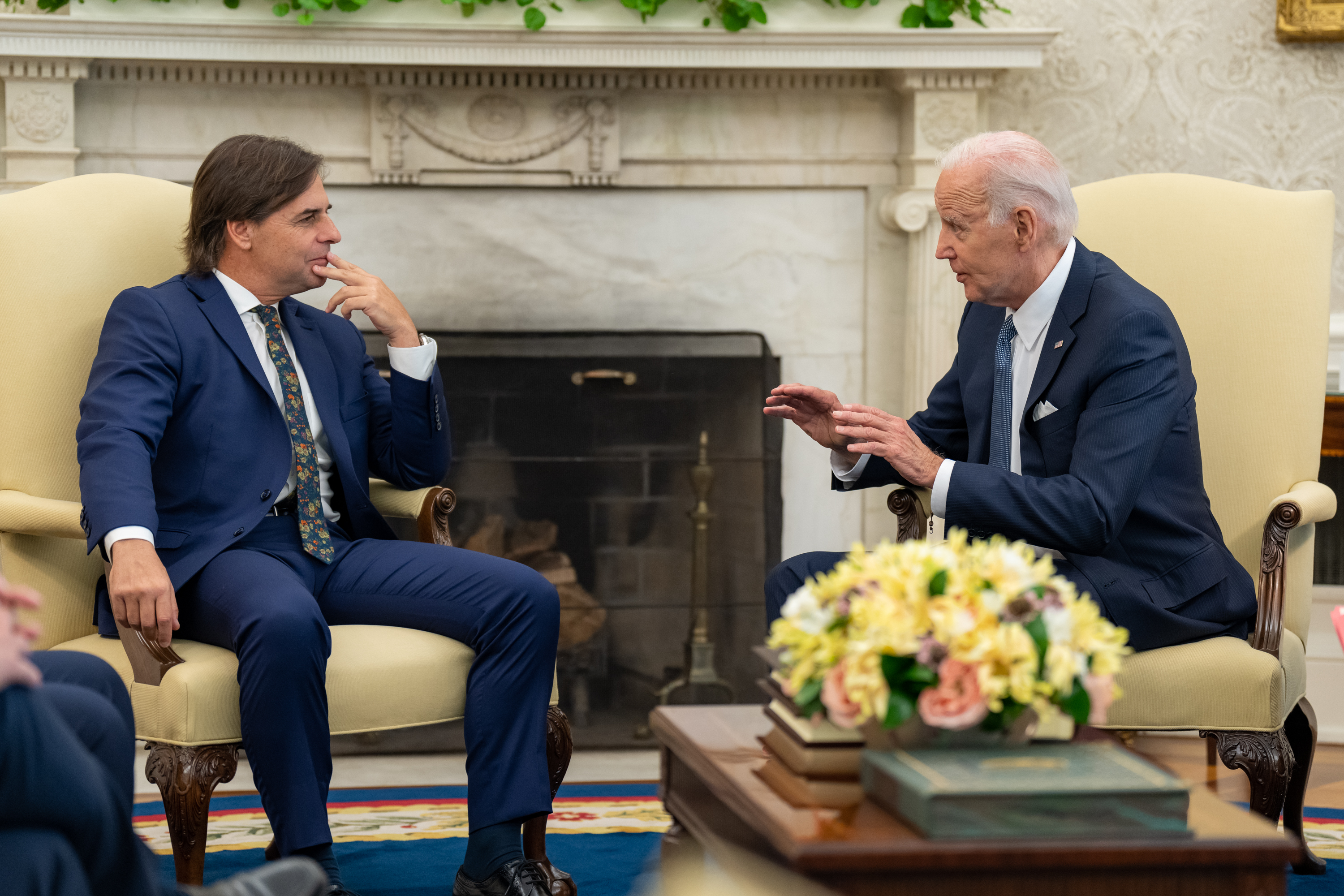

== Venezuela ==
Table of Trips
Start	End	Guest	Title	Reason
January 19, 1944	January 24, 1944	Isaías Medina Angarita	President	Guest of U.S. Government. Addressed U.S. Congress January 20. Afterwards visited Philadelphia, New York City, New Orleans and Miami. Departed U.S. February 5.
July 1, 1948	July 5, 1948	Rómulo Gallegos	President	Met with President Truman in Washington, D.C. and Bolivar
February 19, 1963	February 21, 1963	Rómulo Betancourt	President	Official visit. In U.S. February 18–23, visited San Juan, New York City, and Miami.
June 2, 1970	June 4, 1970	Rafael Caldera	President	State visit. Addressed Joint Session of U.S. Congress June 3. Afterwards visited Houston. Departed U.S. June 5.
June 28, 1977	June 30, 1977	Carlos Andrés Pérez	President	State visit. In U.S. June 27 – July 2; visited Williamsburg, New York City, Philadelphia, and Chicago.
September 6, 1977	September 9, 1977	Carlos Andrés Pérez	President	Attended signing of the Panama Canal Treaty.
November 16, 1981	November 19, 1981	Luis Herrera Campins	President	State visit.
December 3, 1984	December 5, 1984	Jaime Lusinchi	President	State visit. Afterwards visited San Francisco. Departed U.S. December 8.
March 30, 1989	April 1, 1989	Carlos Andrés Pérez	President	Met with President Bush during a private visit. Also attended Consultation on a New Hemispheric Agenda in Atlanta.
September 25, 1989	September 25, 1989	Carlos Andrés Pérez	President	Met with President Bush at the U.N. General Assembly.
April 25, 1989	April 26, 1989	Carlos Andrés Pérez	President	State Visit. Private visit to New York City afterwards.
September 30, 1990	September 30, 1990	Carlos Andrés Pérez	President	Met with President Bush at the U.N. General Assembly.
May 3, 1991	May 3, 1991	Carlos Andrés Pérez	President	Met with President Bush during a private visit. Later visited Houston, Tulsa, and Palo Alto
September 24, 1991	September 24, 1991	Carlos Andrés Pérez	President	Met with President Bush at the U.N. General Assembly.
January 31, 1992	January 31, 1992	Carlos Andrés Pérez	President	Met with President Bush during a U.N. Security Council Summit in New York City.
December 9, 1994	December 11, 1994	Rafael Caldera	President	Attended the Summit of the Americas in Miami
January 28, 1999	January 28, 1999	Hugo Chávez	President	Met with President Clinton during a private visit.
September 21, 1999	September 21, 1999	Hugo Chávez	President	Met with President Clinton during a meeting of the United Nations General Assembly in New York City.
February 5, 2020	February 5, 2020	Juan Guaidó	President	Working visit.

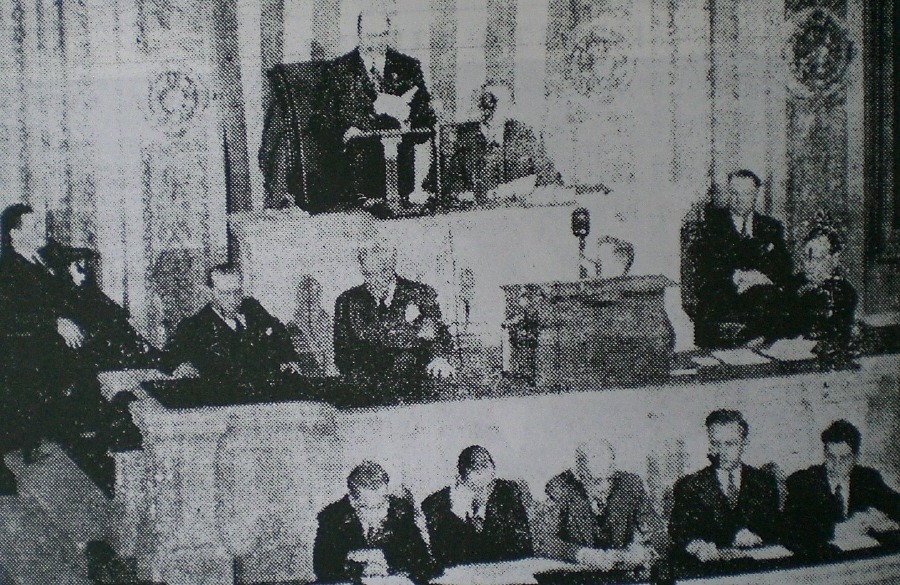

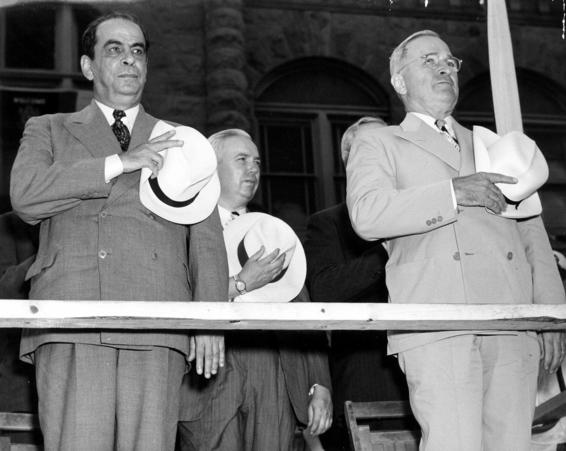

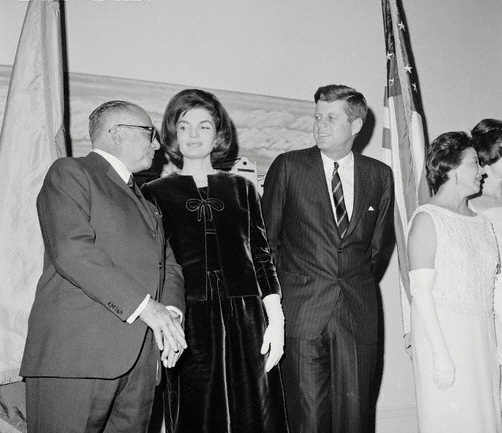

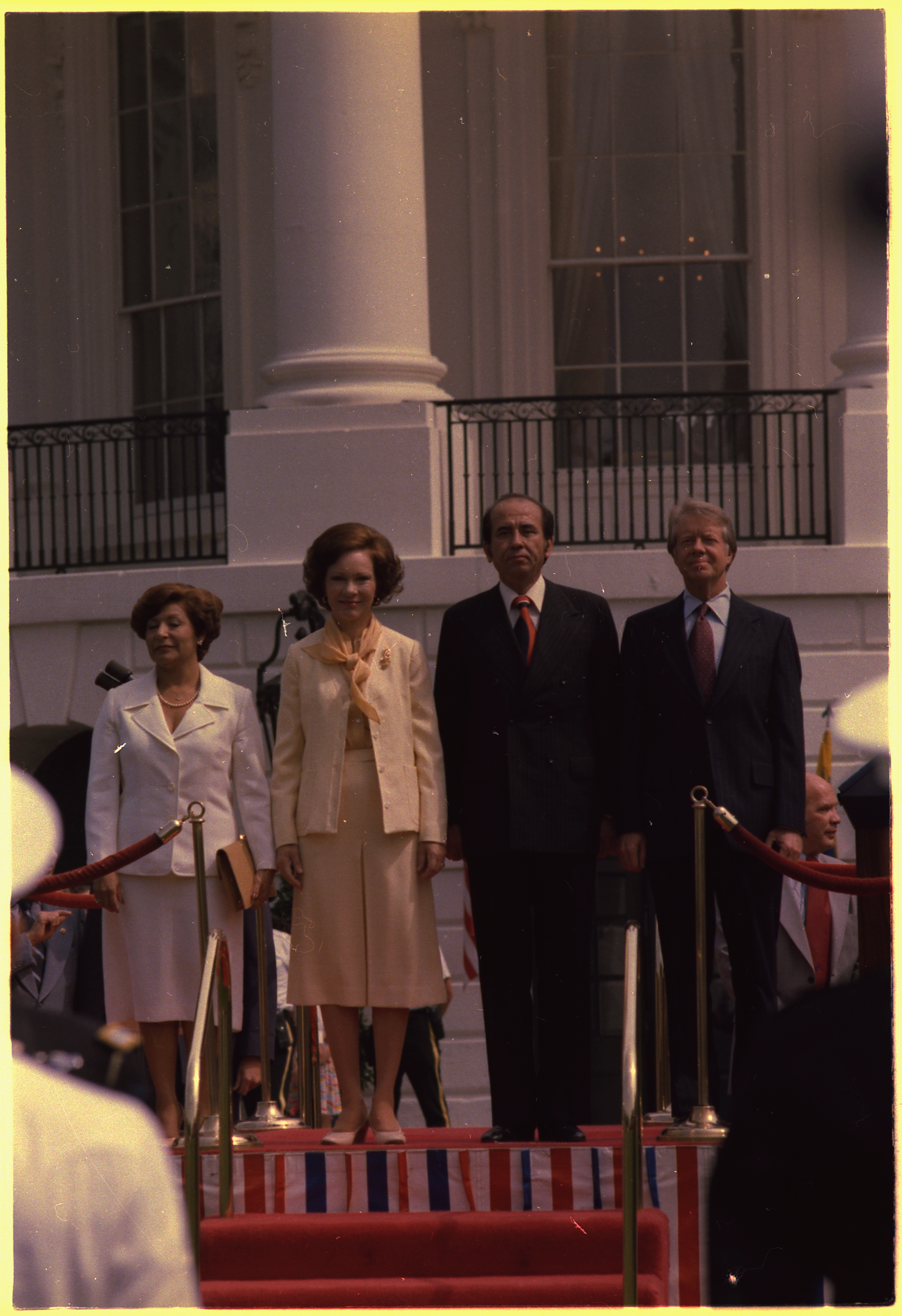

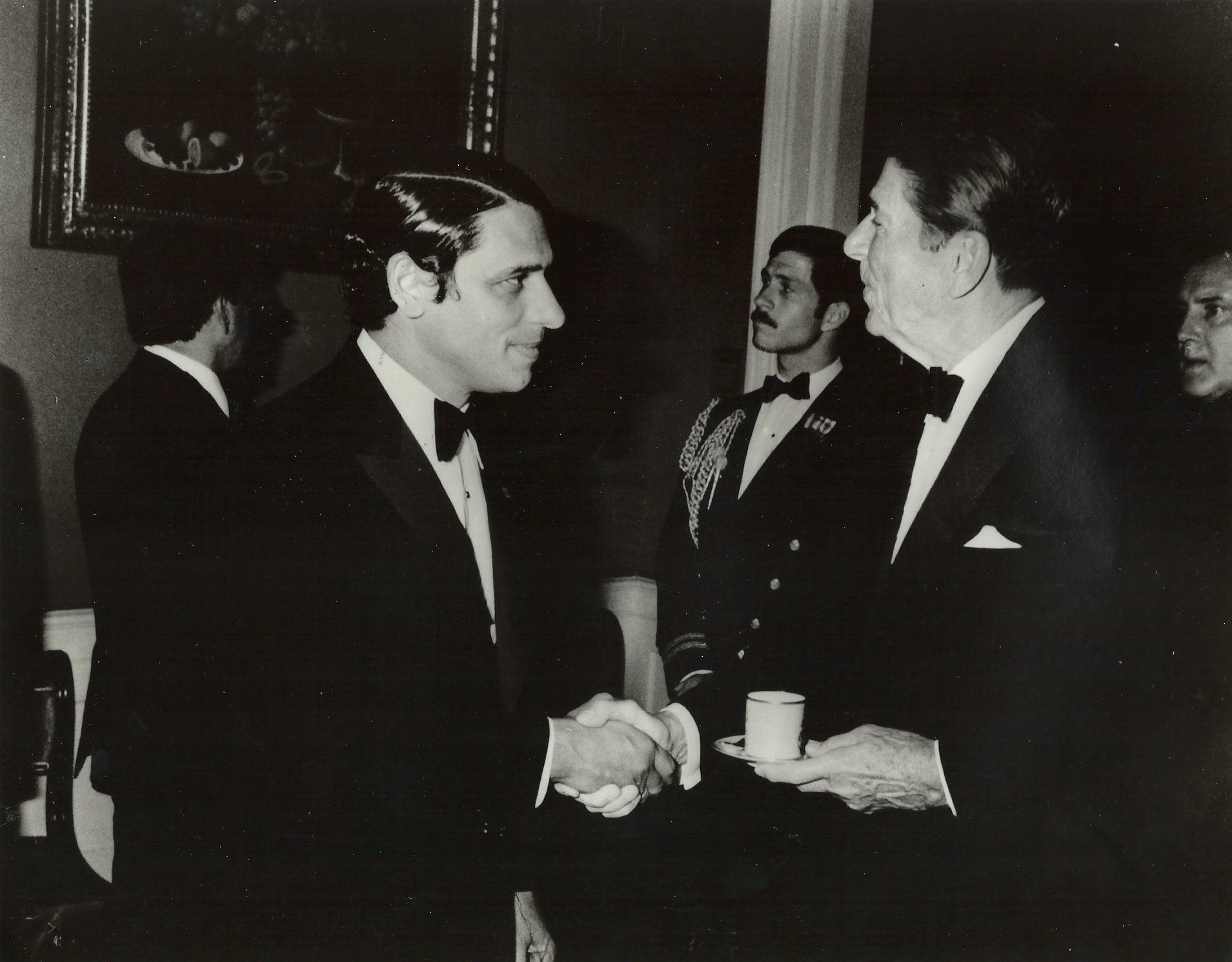

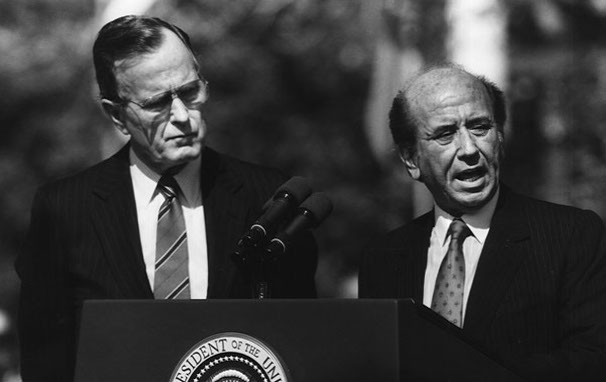

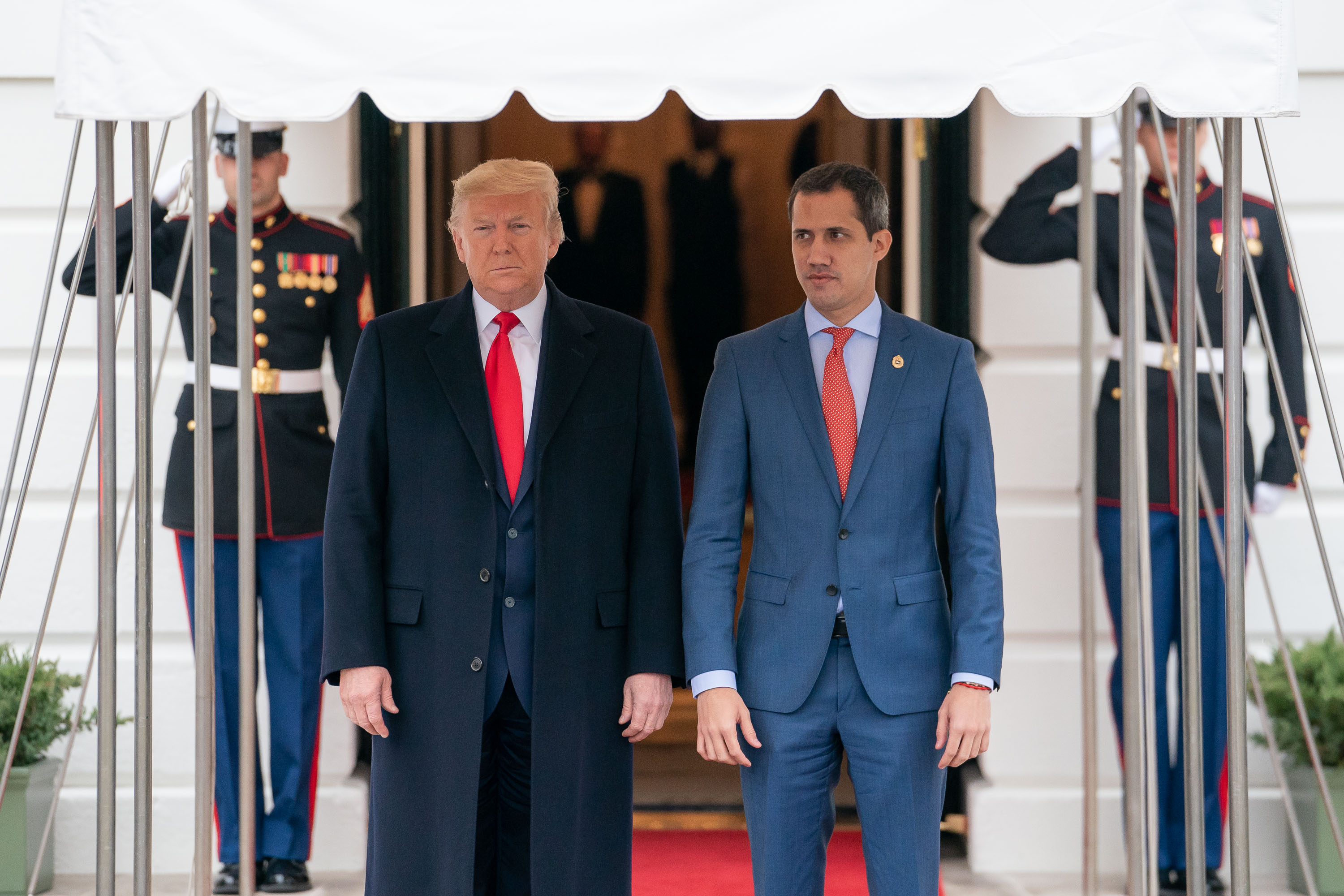

== See also ==
- Foreign policy of the United States
- Foreign relations of the United States
- List of international trips made by presidents of the United States
- List of diplomatic visits to the United States
- State visit
