= List of diplomatic visits to the United States from North America and the Caribbean =

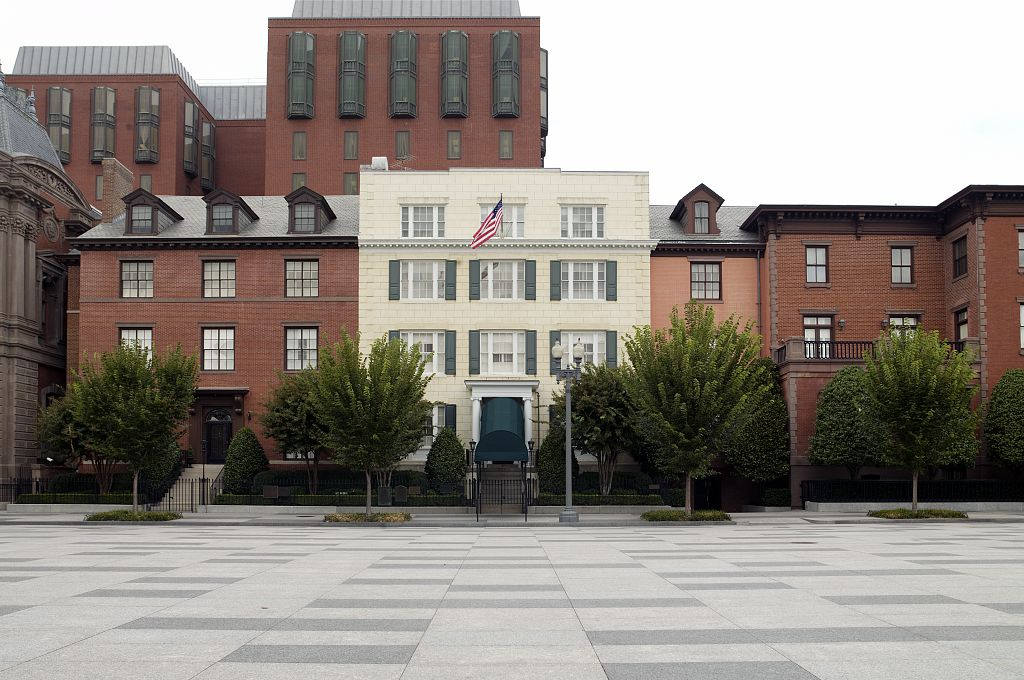
The President's Guest House, commonly known as Blair House has been the official guest house of visiting dignitaries in Washington D.C. since 1824

The first international visit to the United States was made by King Kalakaua of Hawaii in 1874, which was the first visit by a foreign chief of state or head of government.[1]

The first North American head of state to visit the United States was President Justo Rufino Barrios of Guatemala in 1882.

== Antigua and Barbuda ==
Table of Trips
Start	End	Guest	Title	Reason
September 16, 1994	September 16, 1994	Lester Bird	Prime Minister	Discussed the despatch of a multinational force to Haiti.
December 9, 1994	December 11, 1994	Lester Bird	Prime Minister	Attended the Summit of the Americas in Miami.
June 18, 2007	June 20, 2007	Baldwin Spencer	Prime Minister	Attended CARICOM meeting.
June 8, 2022	June 10, 2022	Gaston Browne	Prime Minister	Attended the Summit of the Americas in Los Angeles, California.

== Bahamas ==
Table of Trips
Start	End	Guest	Title	Reason
September 6, 1977	September 6, 1977	Lynden Pindling	Prime Minister	Attended signing of the Panama Canal Treaty.
August 30, 1993	August 30, 1993	Hubert Ingraham	Prime Minister	Attended a CARICOM working luncheon.
December 9, 1994	December 11, 1994	Hubert Ingraham	Prime Minister	Attended the Summit of the Americas in Miami
September 24, 2003	September 24, 2003	Perry Christie	Prime Minister	Met with President Bush at the UN General Assembly in New York City.
June 18, 2007	June 20, 2007	Hubert Ingraham	Prime Minister	Attended CARICOM meeting
March 19, 2008	March 20, 2008	Hubert Ingraham	Prime Minister	Working visit.
March 22, 2019	March 22, 2019	Hubert Ingraham	Prime Minister	Caribbean Leaders Conference at Mar-a-Lago, Florida.
June 8, 2022	June 10, 2022	Philip Davis	Prime Minister	Attended the Summit of the Americas in Los Angeles, California.

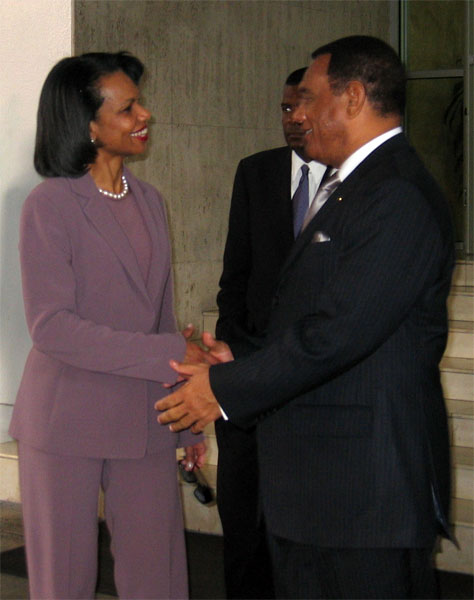

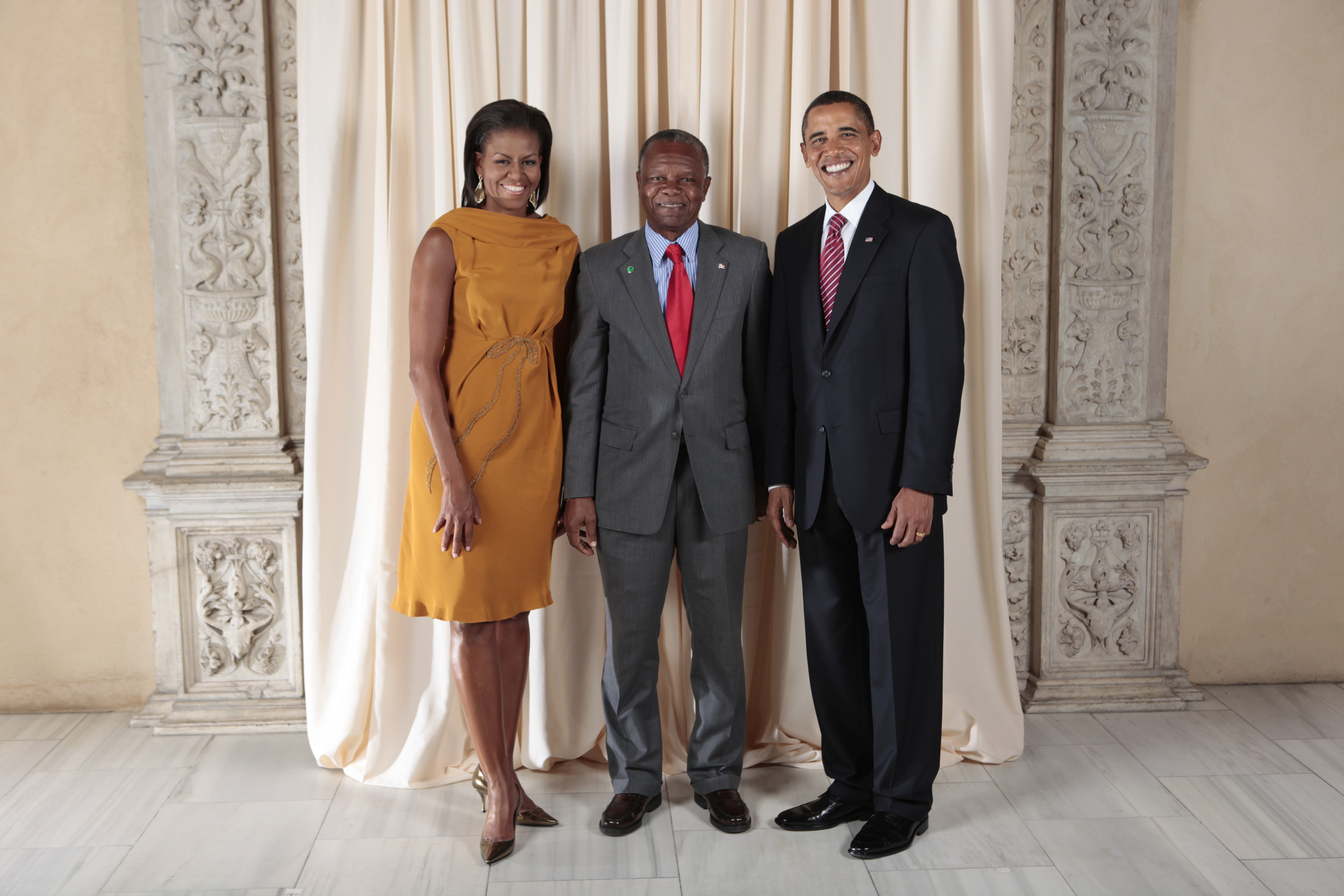

== Barbados ==
Table of Trips
Start	End	Guest	Title	Reason
September 11, 1968	September 12, 1968	Errol Barrow	Prime Minister	Official visit. Private visit to New York City and Philadelphia September 8–10, and to San Francisco September 13–16.
April 27, 1980	April 28, 1980	Tom Adams	Prime Minister	Private visit. Met with President Carter April 28.
August 30, 1993	August 30, 1993	Lloyd Erskine Sandiford	Prime Minister	Attended a CARICOM working luncheon.
September 16, 1994	September 16, 1994	Owen Arthur	Prime Minister	Discussed the despatch of a multinational force to Haiti.
December 9, 1994	December 11, 1994	Owen Arthur	Prime Minister	Attended the Summit of the Americas in Miami
March 19, 2008	March 20, 2008	David Thompson	Prime Minister	Working visit.
November 2, 2023	November 2, 2023	Mia Mottley	Prime Minister	Attended the APEP Leaders' Summit.

== Belize ==
Table of Trips
Start	End	Guest	Title	Reason
May 11, 1983	May 14, 1983	George Cadle Price	Prime Minister	Official working visit
November 30, 1993	November 30, 1993	Manuel Esquivel	Prime Minister	Attended working brunch with President Clinton.
December 9, 1994	December 11, 1994	Manuel Esquivel	Prime Minister	Attended the Summit of the Americas in Miami
March 19, 2008	March 20, 2008	Dean Barrow	Prime Minister	Working visit.
June 8, 2022	June 10, 2022	Johnny Briceño	Prime Minister	Attended the Summit of the Americas in Los Angeles, California.

== Canada ==
Table of Trips
Start	End	Guest	Title	Reason
April 24, 1933	April 28, 1933	Richard Bedford Bennett	Prime Minister	Multilateral economic conversations before the World Monetary and Economic Conference.
November 7, 1935	November 9, 1935	William Lyon Mackenzie King	Prime Minister	Discussed bilateral trade relations.
March 5, 1937	March 11, 1937	William Lyon Mackenzie King	Prime Minister	Guest of the President. Afterwards visited Virginia Beach. Departed U.S. March 20.
March 30, 1937	April 1, 1937	John Buchan	Governor General	Also visited Annapolis on April 1.
November 17, 1938	November 18, 1938	William Lyon Mackenzie King	Prime Minister	Signed a reciprocal trade agreement. Departed U.S. November 20.
June 8, 1939	June 9, 1939	William Lyon Mackenzie King	Prime Minister	Accompanied King George VI as minister in attendance.
April 23, 1940	April 29, 1940	William Lyon Mackenzie King	Prime Minister	Met with President Roosevelt at Warm Springs, April 23–24. Afterward visited Williamsburg. Met with the President in Washington, D.C., April 27–29.
August 17, 1940	August 17, 1940	William Lyon Mackenzie King	Prime Minister	Discussed problems of mutual defense with President Roosevelt at Ogdensburg
October 19, 1940	October 21, 1940	Alexander Cambridge	Governor General	Courtesy visit at Hyde Park
April 16, 1941	April 20, 1941	William Lyon Mackenzie King	Prime Minister	Conferred with President Roosevelt at Washington, D.C. (April 16–17) and Hyde Park (April 20). Signed a defense production agreement. Also visited Virginia Beach
November 1, 1941	November 1, 1941	William Lyon Mackenzie King	Prime Minister	Met with President Roosevelt at Hyde Park. Discussed economic cooperation and coordination of defense production.
December 26, 1941	December 28, 1941	William Lyon Mackenzie King	Prime Minister	Attended the First Washington (Arcadia) Conference.
April 15, 1942	April 17, 1942	William Lyon Mackenzie King	Prime Minister	Attended a Pacific War Council meeting and met with President Roosevelt
June 25, 1942	June 25, 1942	William Lyon Mackenzie King	Prime Minister	Attended a Pacific War Council meeting
December 4, 1942	December 6, 1942	William Lyon Mackenzie King	Prime Minister	In U.S. December 2. Also visited New York City.
May 18, 1943	May 21, 1943	William Lyon Mackenzie King	Prime Minister	Attended the Trident Conference with President Roosevelt and Prime Minister Churchill. Afterwards visited New York City.
December 6, 1943	December 6, 1943	William Lyon Mackenzie King	Prime Minister	Met briefly with Secretary of State Cordell Hull.
March 13, 1945	March 14, 1945	William Lyon Mackenzie King	Prime Minister	Discussed economic policies and the Canadian role in the United Nations with President Roosevelt. In the U.S. March 10–15. Also visited Williamsburg
March 22, 1945	March 24, 1945	Alexander Cambridge	Governor General	Met with President Roosevelt in Washington, D.C.
April 25, 1945	June 26, 1945	William Lyon Mackenzie King	Prime Minister	Led Canadian delegation to the United Nations Conference on International Organization in San Francisco.
November 10, 1945	November 15, 1945	William Lyon Mackenzie King	Prime Minister	Informal discussions on international control of atomic energy.
October 27, 1946	October 28, 1946	William Lyon Mackenzie King	Prime Minister	At the invitation of the President.
February 4, 1947	February 6, 1947	Harold Alexander	Governor General	Guest of U.S. Government. Afterwards visited New York City.
April 21, 1947	April 23, 1947	William Lyon Mackenzie King	Prime Minister	Informal meeting with President Truman. Arrived in U.S. March 28; also visited Virginia Beach and Williamsburg
February 11, 1949	February 13, 1949	Louis St. Laurent	Prime Minister	Informal visit to Washington, D.C.
May 7, 1953	May 8, 1953	Louis St. Laurent	Prime Minister	Guest of the President. Discussed bilateral relations.
May 3, 1954	May 5, 1954	Vincent Massey	Governor General	Addressed U.S. Congress May 4.
March 26, 1956	March 28, 1956	Louis St. Laurent	Prime Minister	Attended a Heads of Government meeting in White Sulphur Springs
October 16, 1957	October 21, 1957	Elizabeth II	Queen	Accompanied by Prime Minister John Diefenbaker
June 3, 1960	June 4, 1960	John Diefenbaker	Prime Minister	Official visit to Washington, D.C.
August 27, 1960	August 27, 1960	John Diefenbaker	Prime Minister	Met with President Eisenhower in New York City while attending UN General Assembly session.
January 16, 1961	January 17, 1961	John Diefenbaker	Prime Minister	Signed Treaty on Cooperative Development of the Water Resources of the Columbia River Basin.
February 20, 1961	February 20, 1961	John Diefenbaker	Prime Minister	Informal visit.
May 10, 1963	May 11, 1963	Lester Pearson	Prime Minister	Informal visit at Hyannis Port
November 24, 1963	November 25, 1963	Lester Pearson	Prime Minister	Attended funeral of President Kennedy.
January 21, 1964	January 23, 1964	Lester Pearson	Prime Minister	Official visit. Signed Columbia River Treaty and agreement establishing Campobello International Park.
September 16, 1964	September 16, 1964	Lester Pearson	Prime Minister	Ceremonial visits at Great Falls and Blaine
January 15, 1965	January 16, 1965	Lester Pearson	Prime Minister	Informal visit at LBJ Ranch. Signed agreement on trade in automotive products.
April 3, 1965	April 3, 1965	Lester Pearson	Prime Minister	Informal visit at Camp David
March 24, 1969	March 25, 1969	Pierre Trudeau	Prime Minister	Official visit.
December 6, 1971	December 6, 1971	Pierre Trudeau	Prime Minister	Informal working visit.
December 4, 1974	December 4, 1974	Pierre Trudeau	Prime Minister	Official visit.
June 16, 1976	June 16, 1976	Pierre Trudeau	Prime Minister	Private visit.
June 26, 1976	June 28, 1976	Pierre Trudeau	Prime Minister	Attended G-6 Economic Summit meeting in Dorado, Puerto Rico.
February 21, 1977	February 22, 1977	Pierre Trudeau	Prime Minister	Official visit.
September 6, 1977	September 9, 1977	Pierre Trudeau	Prime Minister	Attended signing of the Panama Canal Treaty.
May 30, 1978	May 31, 1978	Pierre Trudeau	Prime Minister	Attended NATO Summit conference.
March 3, 1979	March 3, 1979	Pierre Trudeau	Prime Minister	Private visit. Discussed plans for the Northern Gas Pipeline with President Carter.
July 10, 1981	July 11, 1981	Pierre Trudeau	Prime Minister	Official working visit.
September 17, 1981	September 18, 1981	Pierre Trudeau	Prime Minister	Informal meeting at the dedication of the Gerald R. Ford Presidential Museum, Grand Rapids
April 27, 1983	April 28, 1983	Pierre Trudeau	Prime Minister	Official working visit.
April 28, 1983	May 3, 1983	Pierre Trudeau	Prime Minister	Attended G-7 Summit Meeting, Williamsburg
December 15, 1983	December 16, 1983	Pierre Trudeau	Prime Minister	Private visit. Discussed proposals for nuclear arms limitations.
September 24, 1984	September 25, 1984	Brian Mulroney	Prime Minister	Official working visit.
October 24, 1985	October 24, 1985	Brian Mulroney	Prime Minister	Met with President Reagan in New York City.
March 17, 1986	March 20, 1986	Brian Mulroney	Prime Minister	Official Visit.
April 26, 1988	April 28, 1988	Brian Mulroney	Prime Minister	Official Visit.
May 4, 1989	May 4, 1989	Brian Mulroney	Prime Minister	Met with President Bush during a private visit.
August 30, 1989	August 31, 1989	Brian Mulroney	Prime Minister	Met with President Bush during a private visit to Kennebunkport
November 29, 1989	November 29, 1989	Brian Mulroney	Prime Minister	Private visit.
July 8, 1990	July 11, 1990	Brian Mulroney	Prime Minister	Attended G-7 Economic Summit meeting in Houston
August 27, 1990	August 28, 1990	Brian Mulroney	Prime Minister	Met with President Bush at Kennebunkport.
September 29, 1990	September 29, 1990	Brian Mulroney	Prime Minister	Met with President Bush at the U.N. General Assembly.
August 26, 1991	August 26, 1991	Brian Mulroney	Prime Minister	Informal meeting with President Bush at Kennebunkport.
May 19, 1992	May 21, 1992	Brian Mulroney	Prime Minister	Official working visit.
October 7, 1992	October 7, 1992	Brian Mulroney	Prime Minister	Attended the initialling of the North American Free Trade Agreement in San Antonio
February 4, 1993	February 5, 1993	Brian Mulroney	Prime Minister	Met with President Clinton during a private visit.
June 1, 1993	June 2, 1993	Brian Mulroney	Prime Minister	Met with President Clinton during a private visit.
November 19, 1993	November 20, 1993	Jean Chrétien	Prime Minister	Attended APEC meeting in Seattle.
December 9, 1994	December 11, 1994	Jean Chrétien	Prime Minister	Attended the Summit of the Americas in Miami
April 7, 1997	April 9, 1997	Jean Chrétien	Prime Minister	Official visit.
June 20, 1997	June 22, 1997	Jean Chrétien	Prime Minister	Attended the G-8 Economic Summit Meeting in Denver
April 23, 1999	April 25, 1999	Jean Chrétien	Prime Minister	Attended NATO's 50th Anniversary Summit.
January 23, 2000	January 23, 2000	Jean Chrétien	Prime Minister	Met with President Clinton during a private visit.
December 2, 2000	December 2, 2000	Jean Chrétien	Prime Minister	Met with President Clinton during a private visit.
February 4, 2001	February 5, 2001	Jean Chrétien	Prime Minister	Working visit. Also addressed Permanent Council of the Organization of American States.
September 4, 2001	September 5, 2001	Jean Chrétien	Prime Minister	Working visit.
March 14, 2002	March 14, 2002	Jean Chrétien	Prime Minister	Met with President Bush during a private visit.
September 9, 2002	September 9, 2002	Jean Chrétien	Prime Minister	Working visit. Discussed the Iraq crisis with President Bush in Detroit.
April 28, 2004	April 30, 2004	Paul Martin	Prime Minister	Working visit.
June 8, 2004	June 10, 2004	Paul Martin	Prime Minister	Attended G-8 Economic Summit at Sea Island, Georgia.
March 23, 2005	March 23, 2005	Paul Martin	Prime Minister	Met with President Bush in Crawford and Waco
July 5, 2006	July 6, 2006	Stephen Harper	Prime Minister	Working visit.
April 21, 2008	April 22, 2008	Stephen Harper	Prime Minister	Attended the North American Leaders' Summit in New Orleans
September 24, 2008	September 24, 2008	Stephen Harper	Prime Minister	Met with President Bush at the Council of the Americas in New York City.
November 14, 2008	November 15, 2008	Stephen Harper	Prime Minister	Attended the G-20 Economic Summit meeting.
September 16, 2009	September 16, 2009	Stephen Harper	Prime Minister	Working Visit.
September 24, 2009	September 25, 2009	Stephen Harper	Prime Minister	Attended the G-20 Economic Summit in Pittsburgh.
April 12, 2010	April 13, 2010	Stephen Harper	Prime Minister	Attended the Nuclear Security Summit.
February 4, 2011	February 4, 2011	Stephen Harper	Prime Minister	Working visit.
November 10, 2011	November 13, 2011	Stephen Harper	Prime Minister	Attended the Asia-Pacific Economic and Cooperation Summit at Honolulu and Kapolei, Hawaii.
December 7, 2011	December 7, 2011	Stephen Harper	Prime Minister	Working visit.
April 2, 2012	April 2, 2012	Stephen Harper	Prime Minister	Attended North American Leaders' Summit.
May 18, 2012	May 19, 2012	Stephen Harper	Prime Minister	Attended the G-8 Economic Summit at Camp David
May 20, 2012	May 21, 2012	Stephen Harper	Prime Minister	Attended the NATO Summit Meeting in Chicago
March 9, 2016	March 11, 2016	Justin Trudeau	Prime Minister	Official visit.
March 31, 2016	April 1, 2016	Justin Trudeau	Prime Minister	Attended the Nuclear Security Summit.
February 13, 2017	February 13, 2017	Justin Trudeau	Prime Minister	Official Working Visit.
October 11, 2017	October 11, 2017	Justin Trudeau	Prime Minister	Official Working Visit.
June 19, 2019	June 20, 2019	Justin Trudeau	Prime Minister	Working Visit.
November 18, 2021	November 18, 2021	Justin Trudeau	Prime Minister	Working Visit; North American Leaders' Summit.
June 8, 2022	June 10, 2022	Justin Trudeau	Prime Minister	Attended the Summit of the Americas in Los Angeles, California.
November 3, 2023	November 3, 2023	Justin Trudeau	Prime Minister	Attended the APEP Leaders' Summit.
November 12, 2023	November 17, 2023	Justin Trudeau	Prime Minister	Attended the APEC Leaders' Summit at San Francisco, California.
July 10, 2024	July 11, 2024	Justin Trudeau	Prime Minister	Attended NATO 75th Anniversary Summit in Washington, D.C.
May 5, 2025	May 6, 2025	Mark Carney	Prime Minister	Working Visit.
October 6, 2025	October 7, 2025	Mark Carney	Prime Minister	Working Visit.

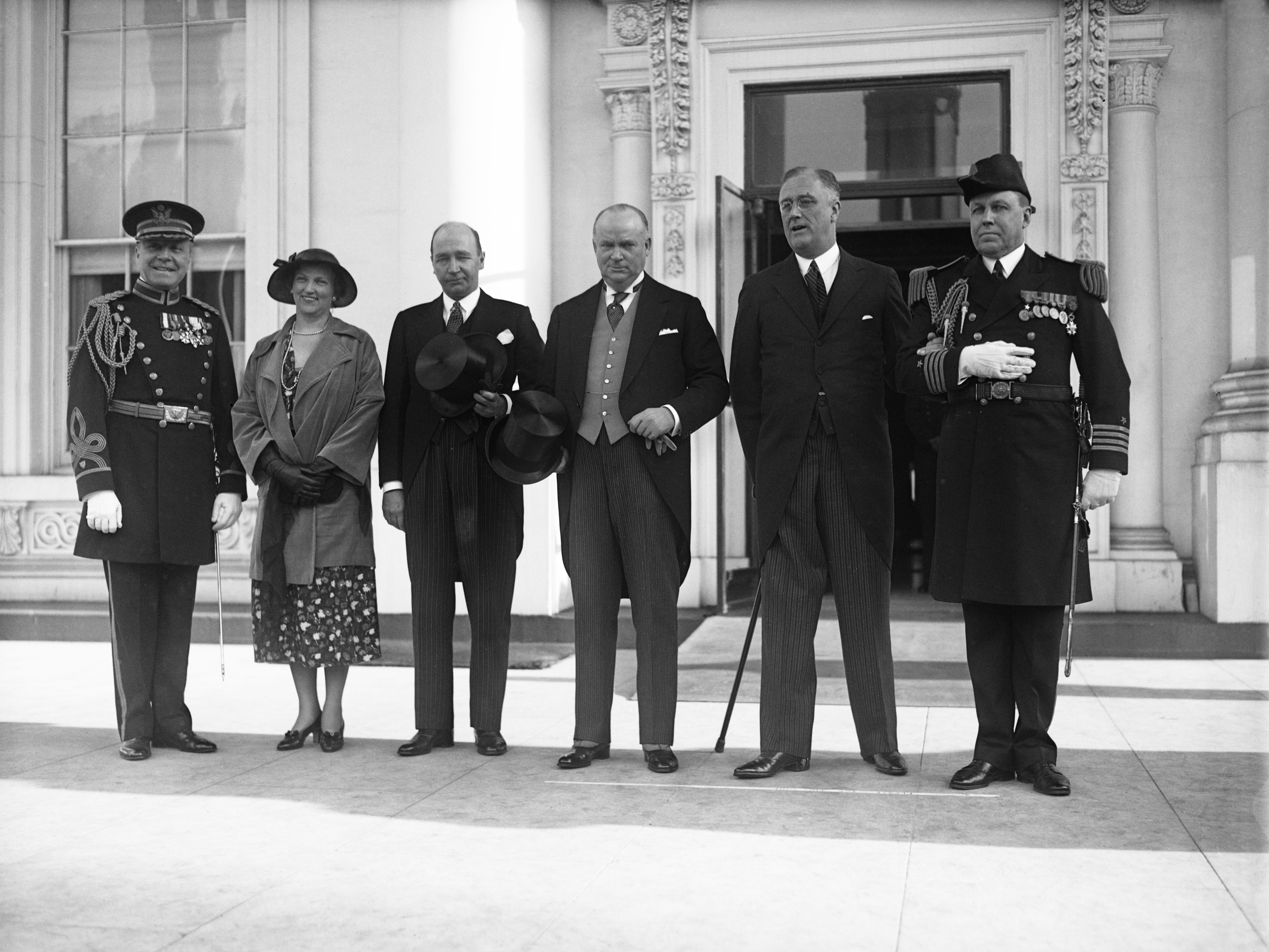

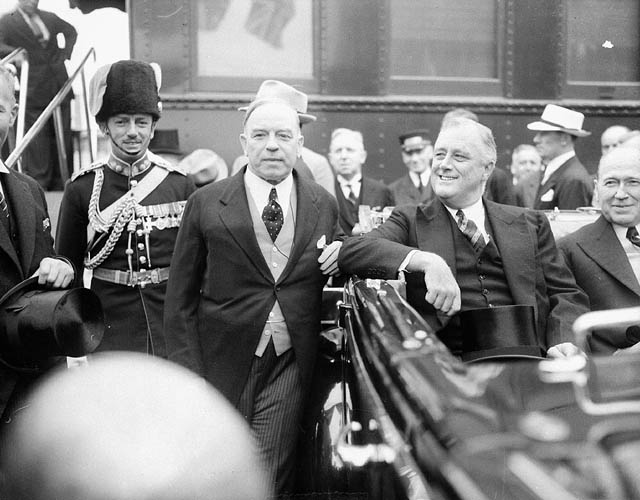

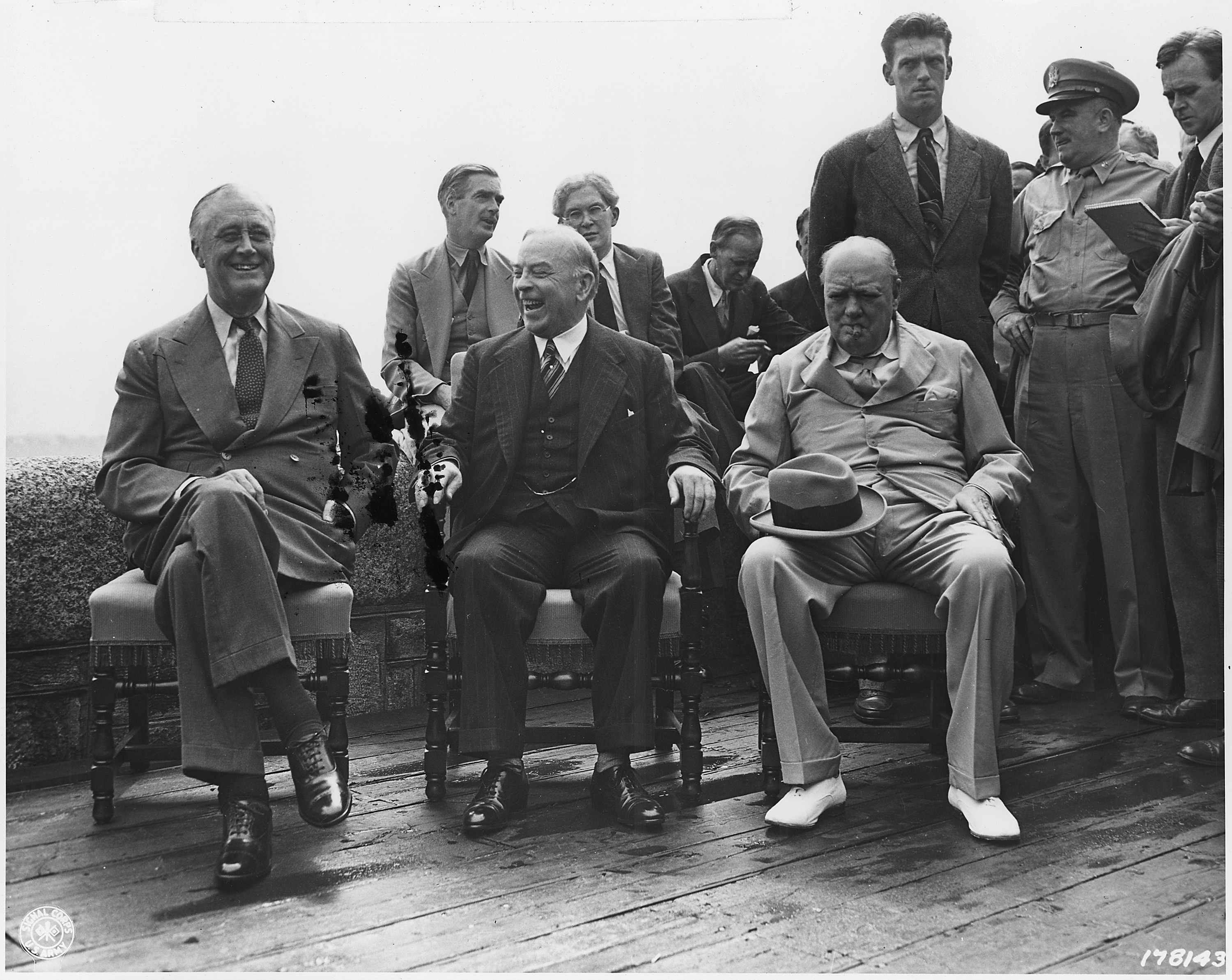

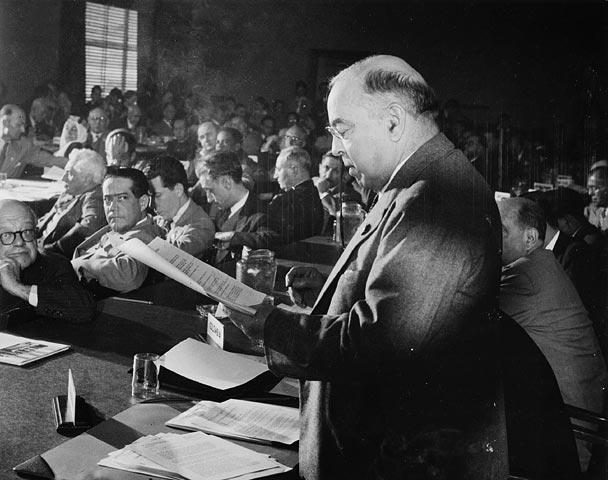

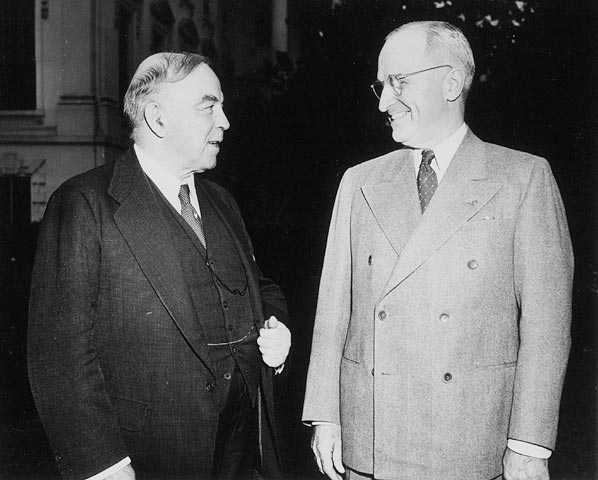

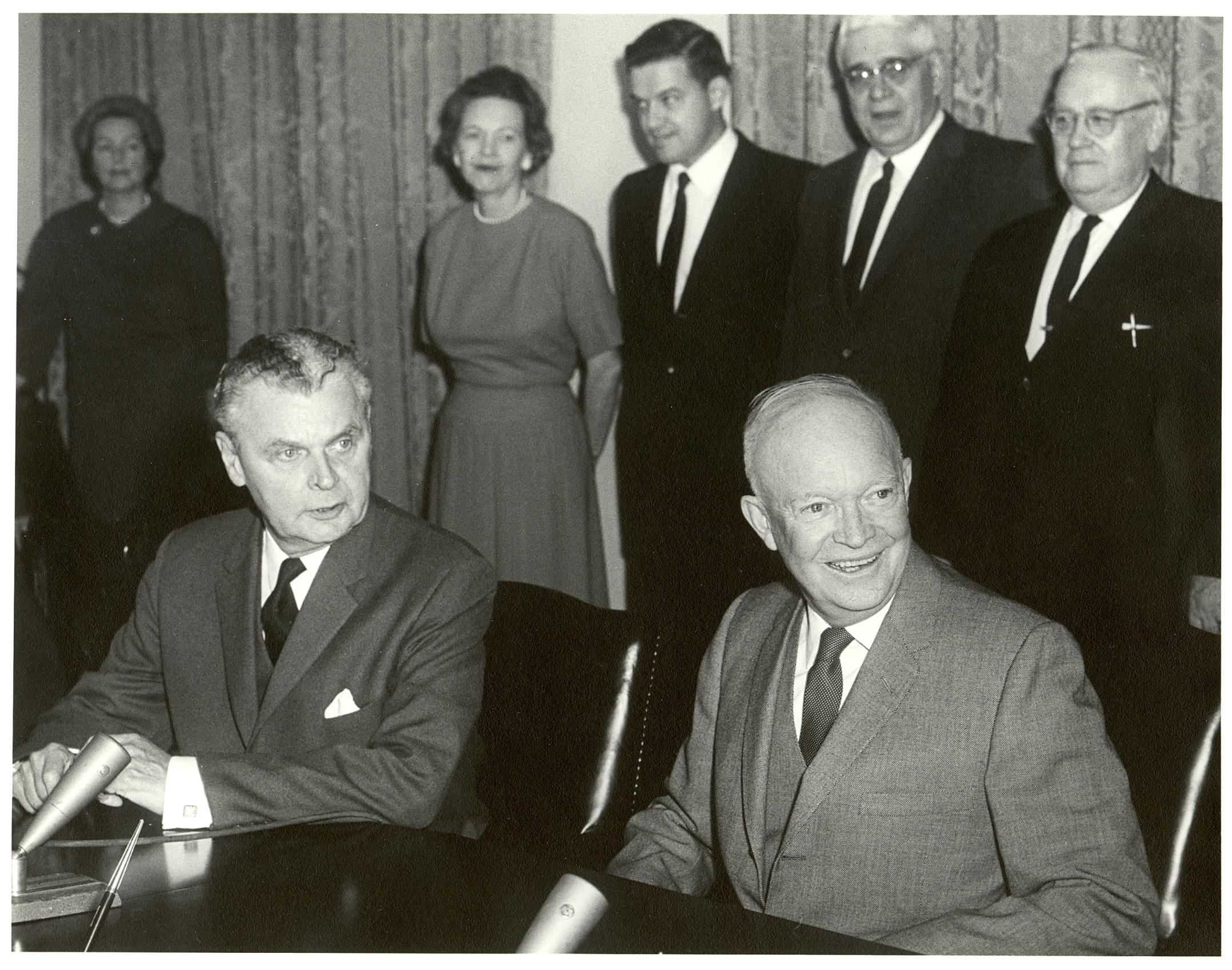

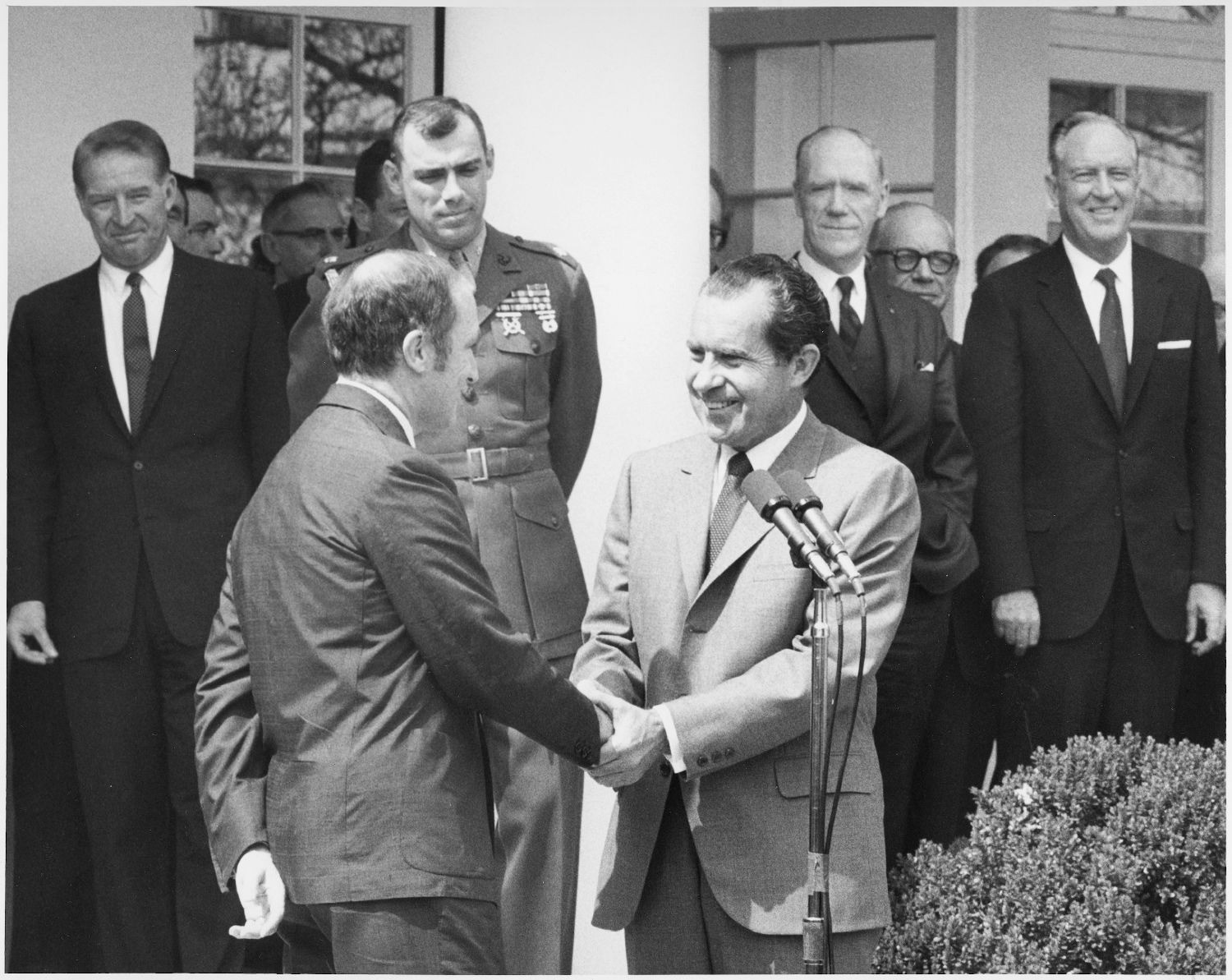

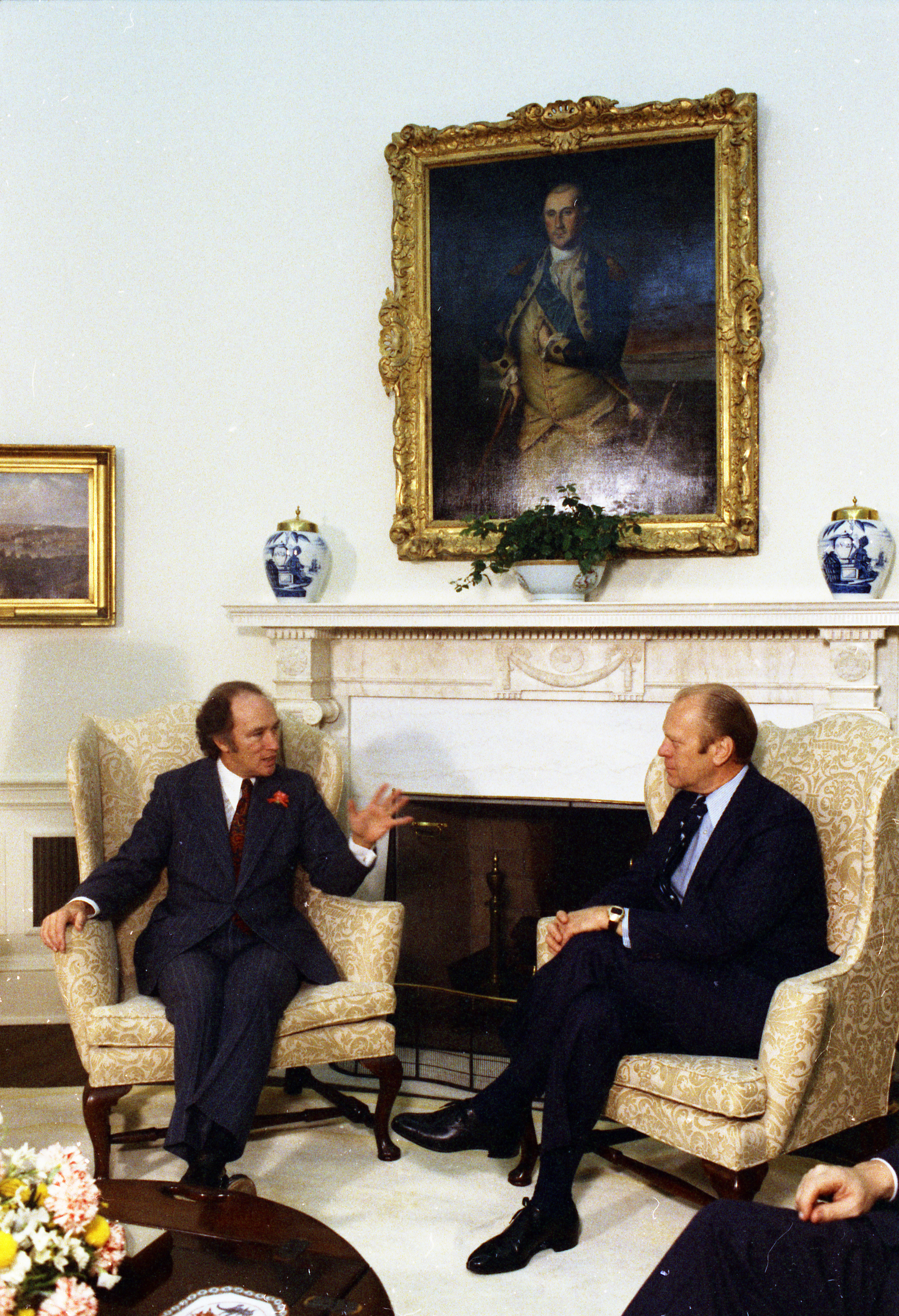

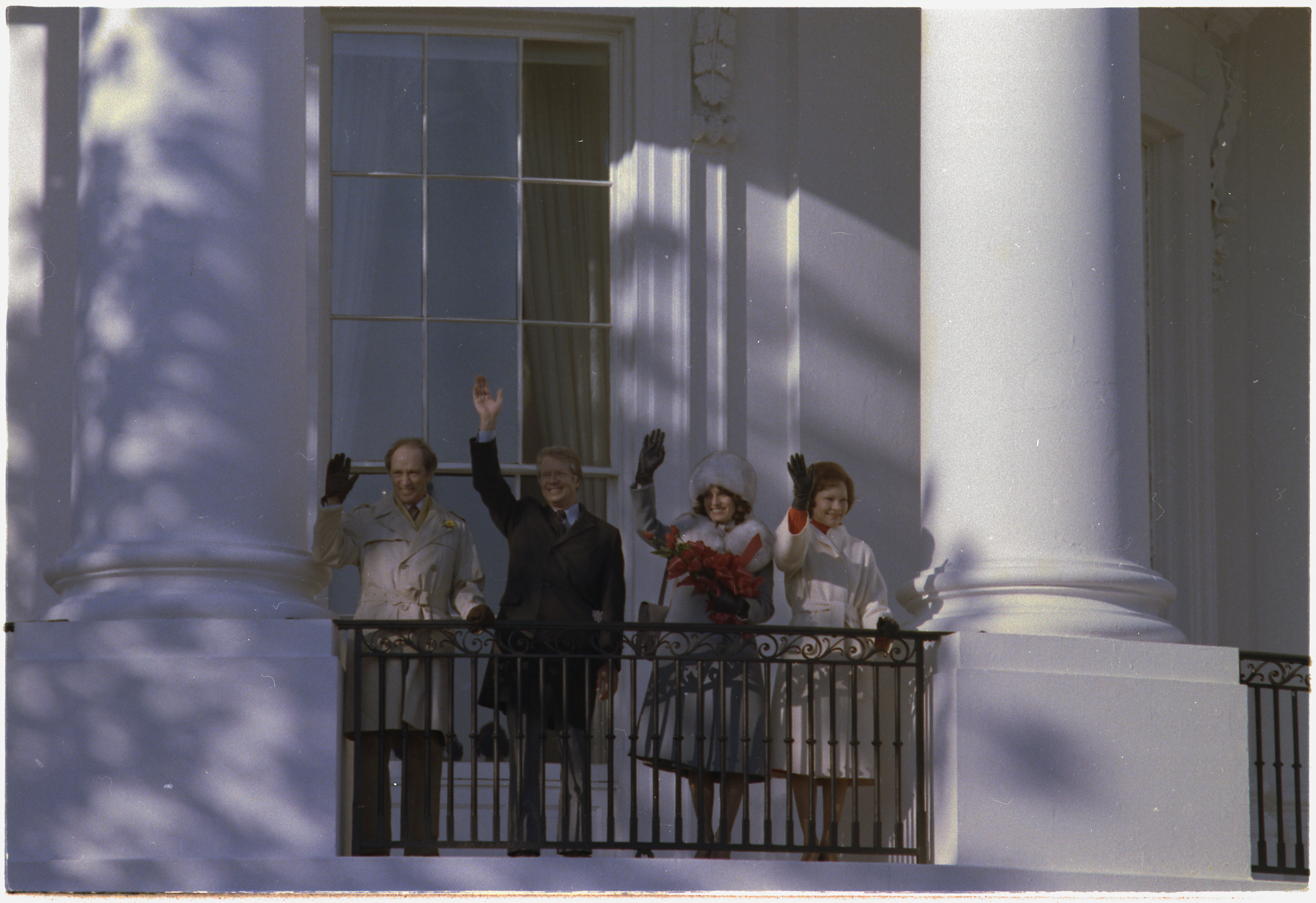

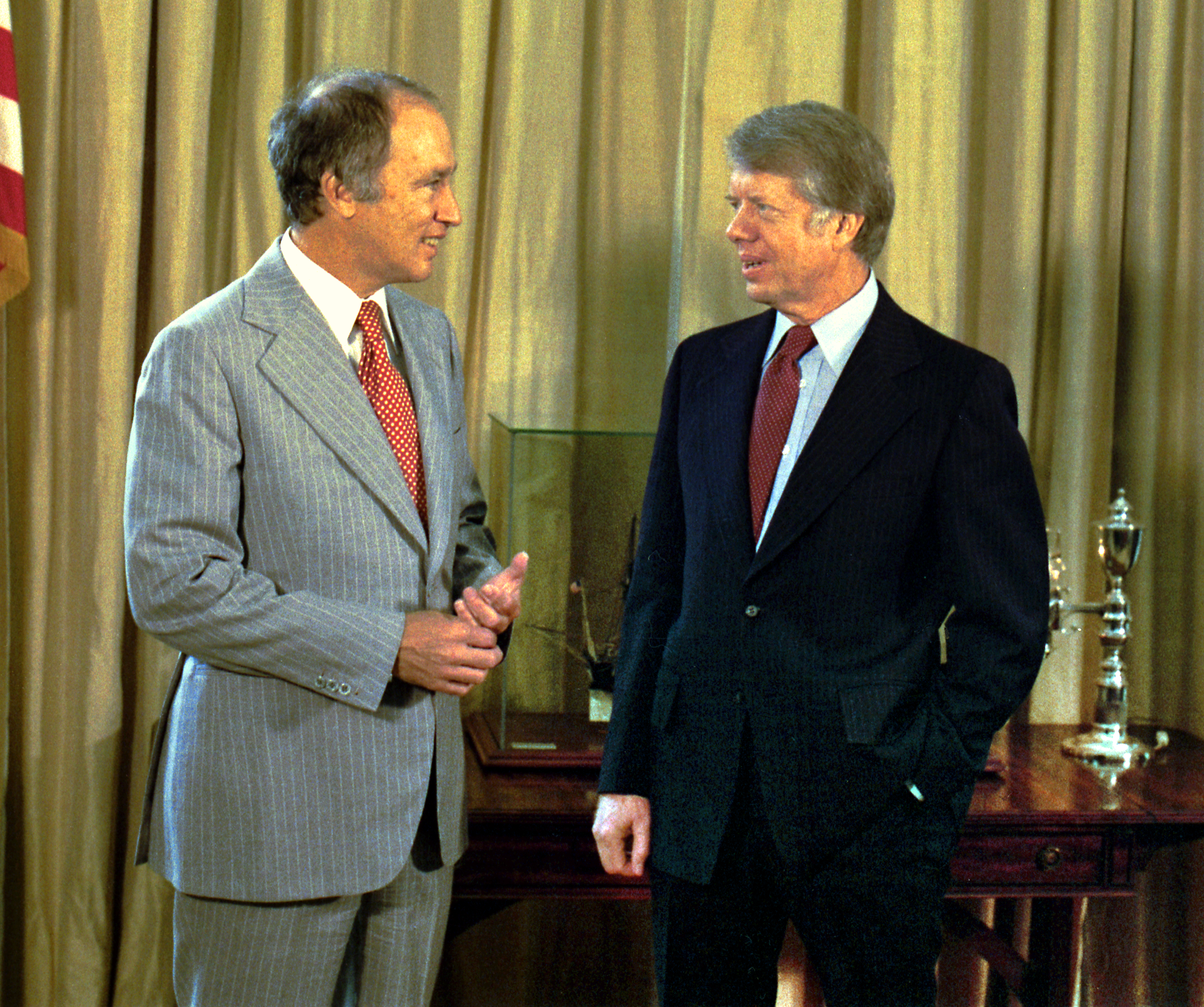

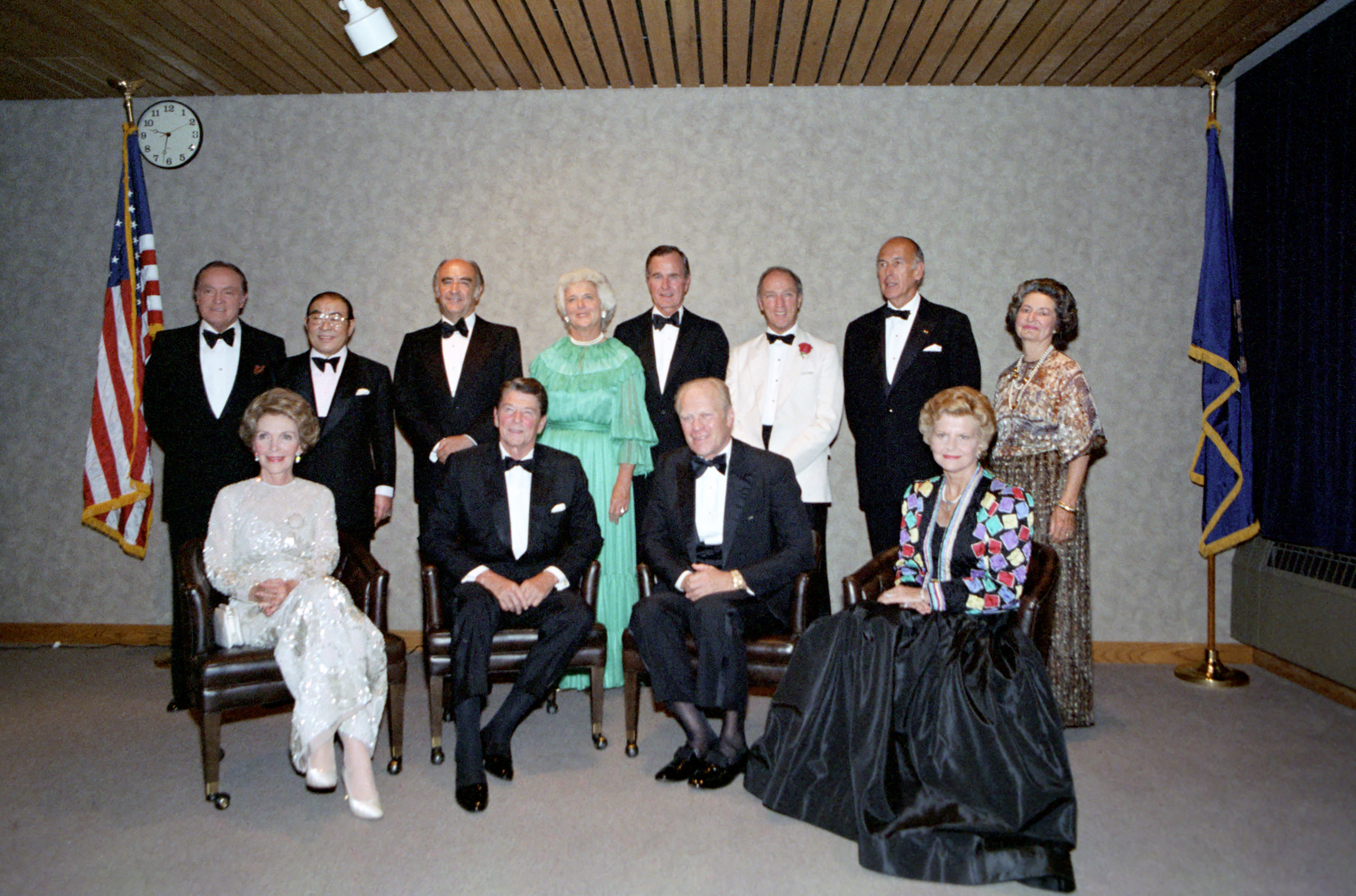

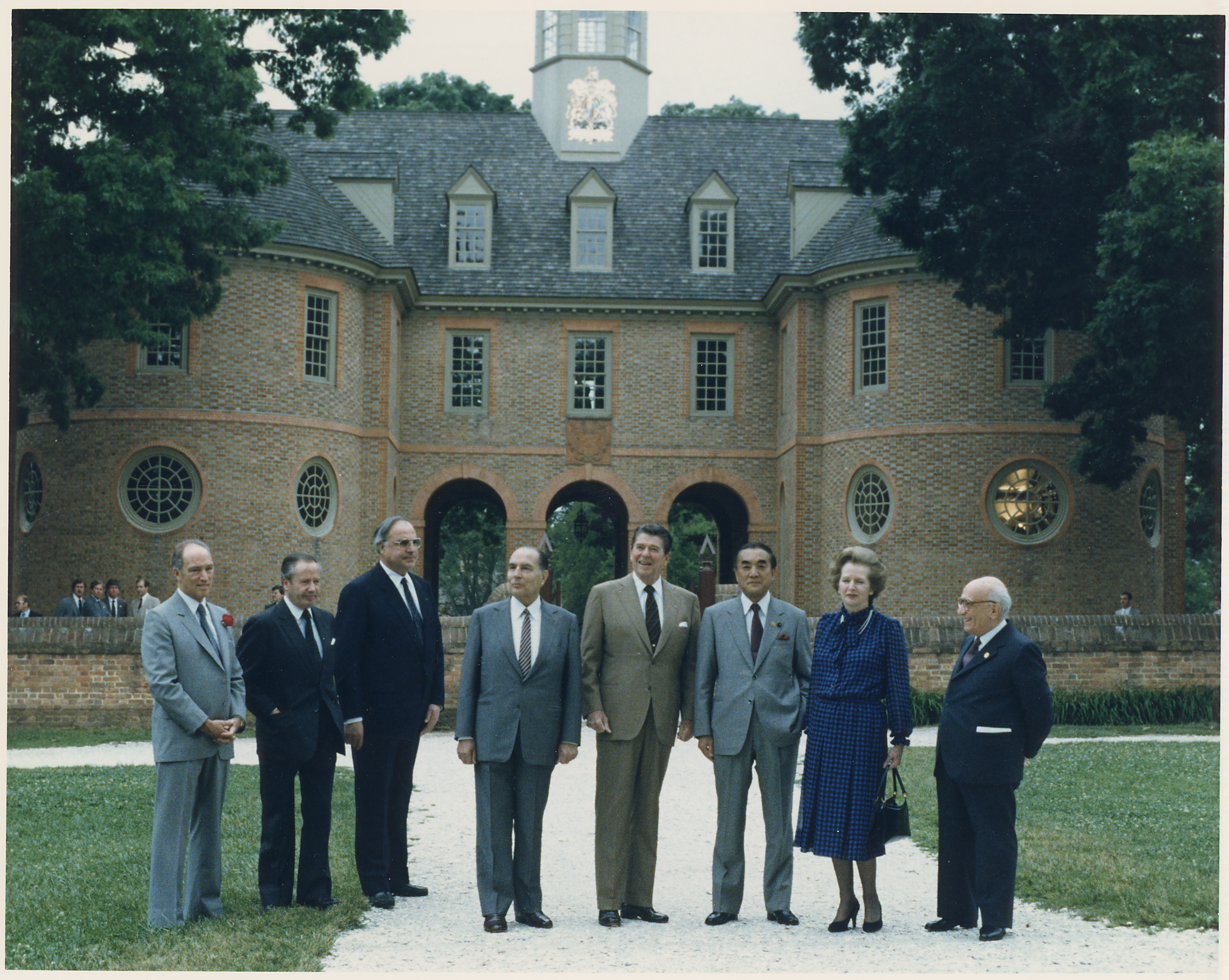

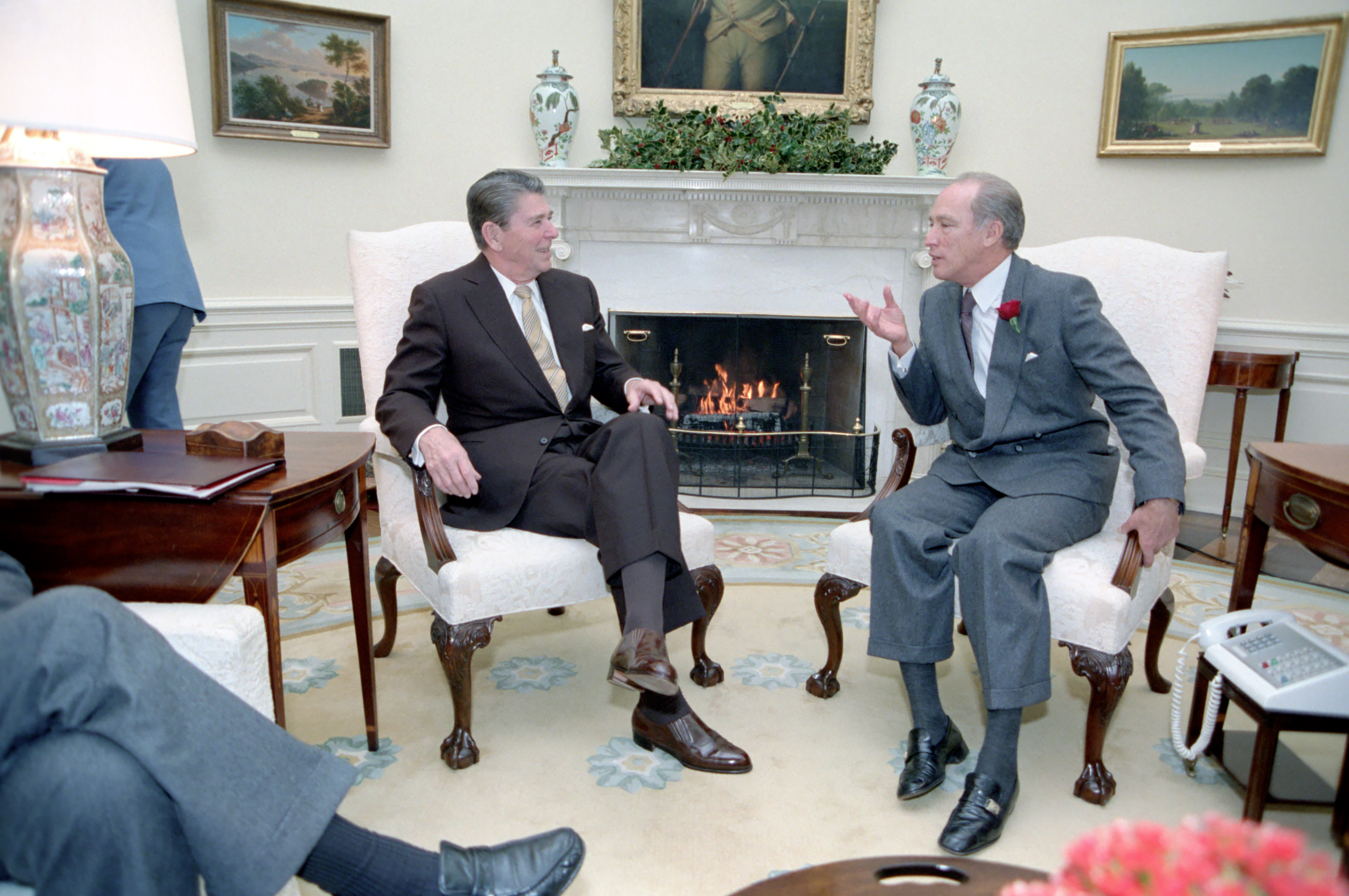

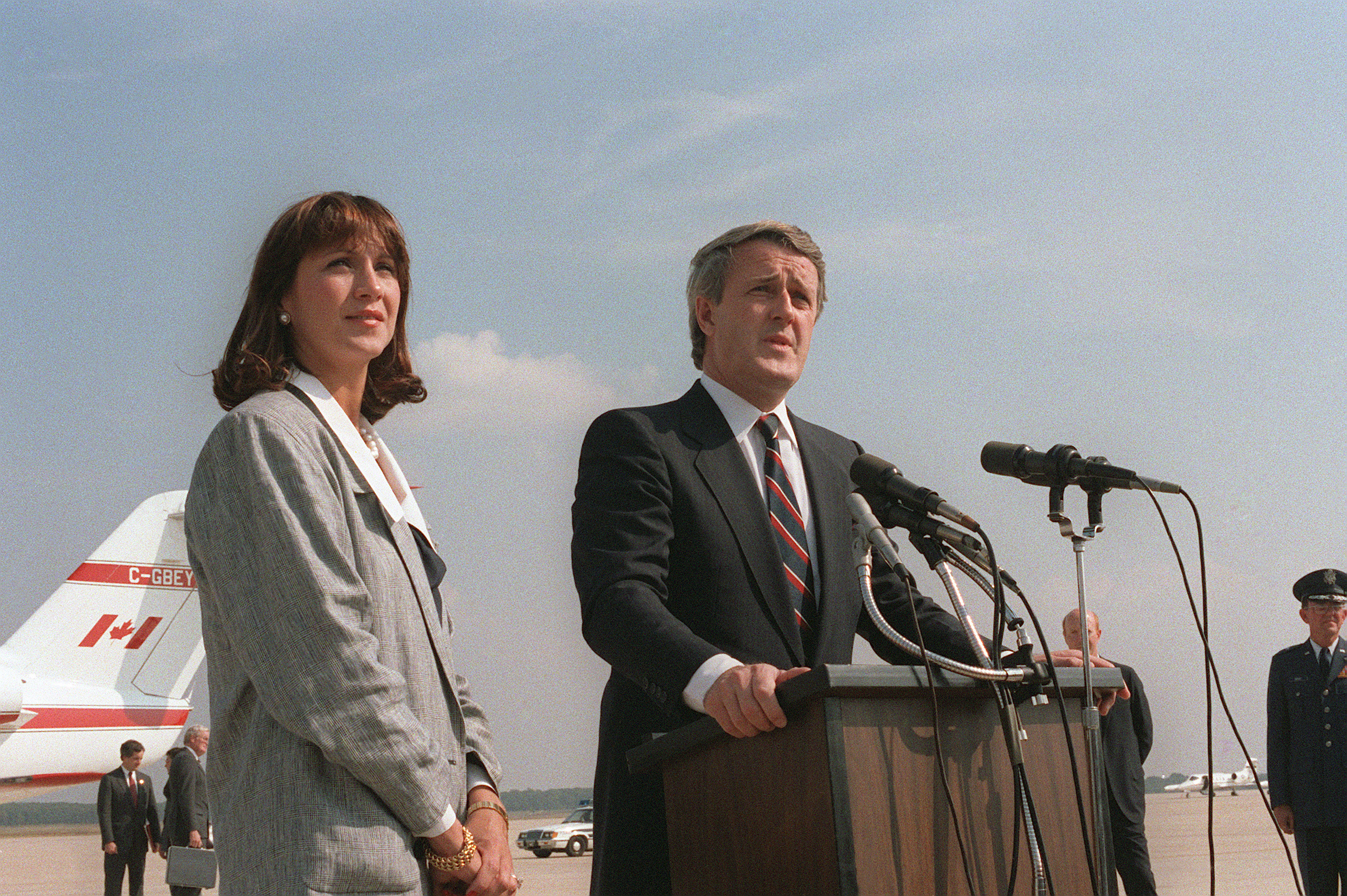

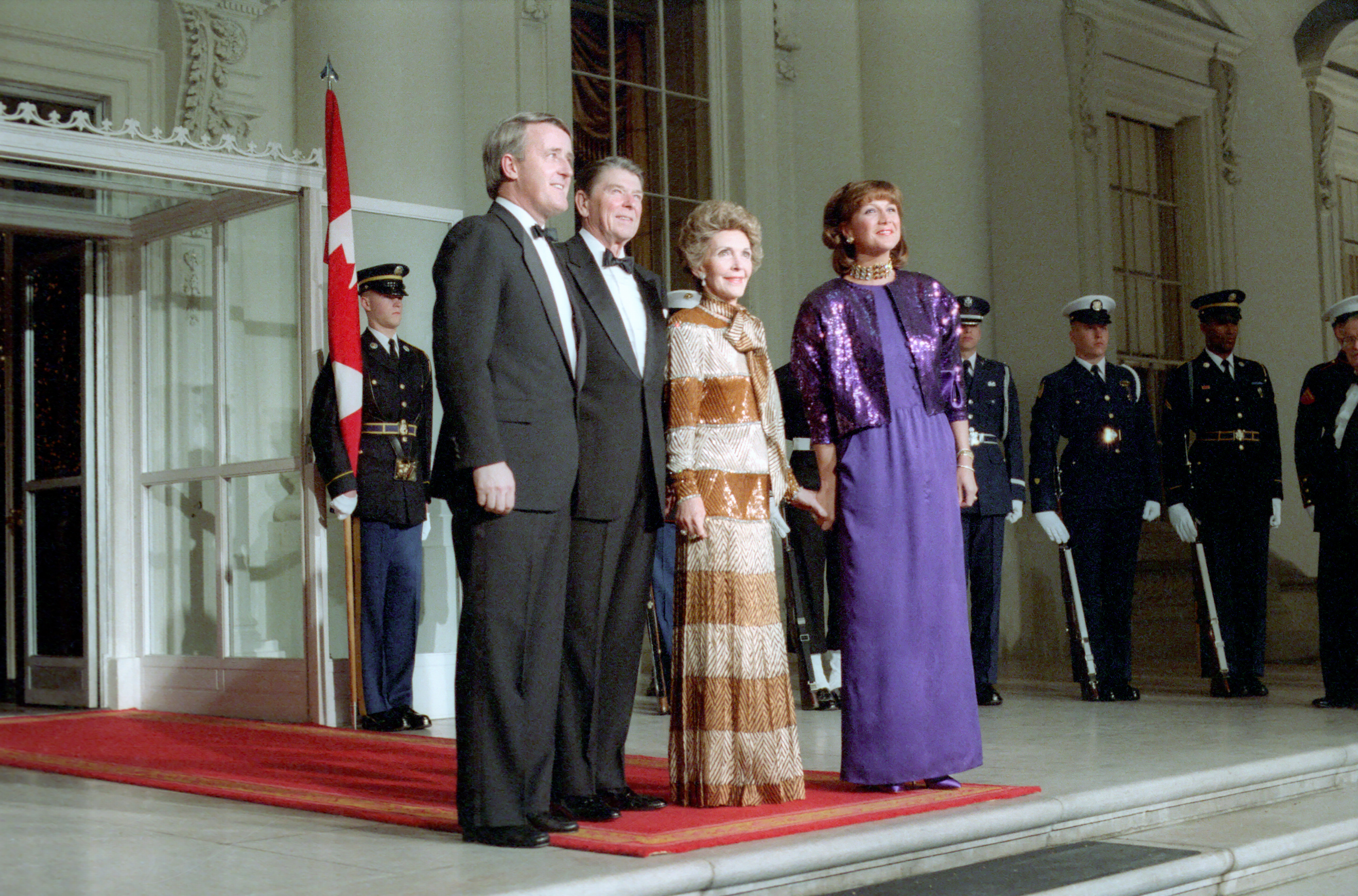

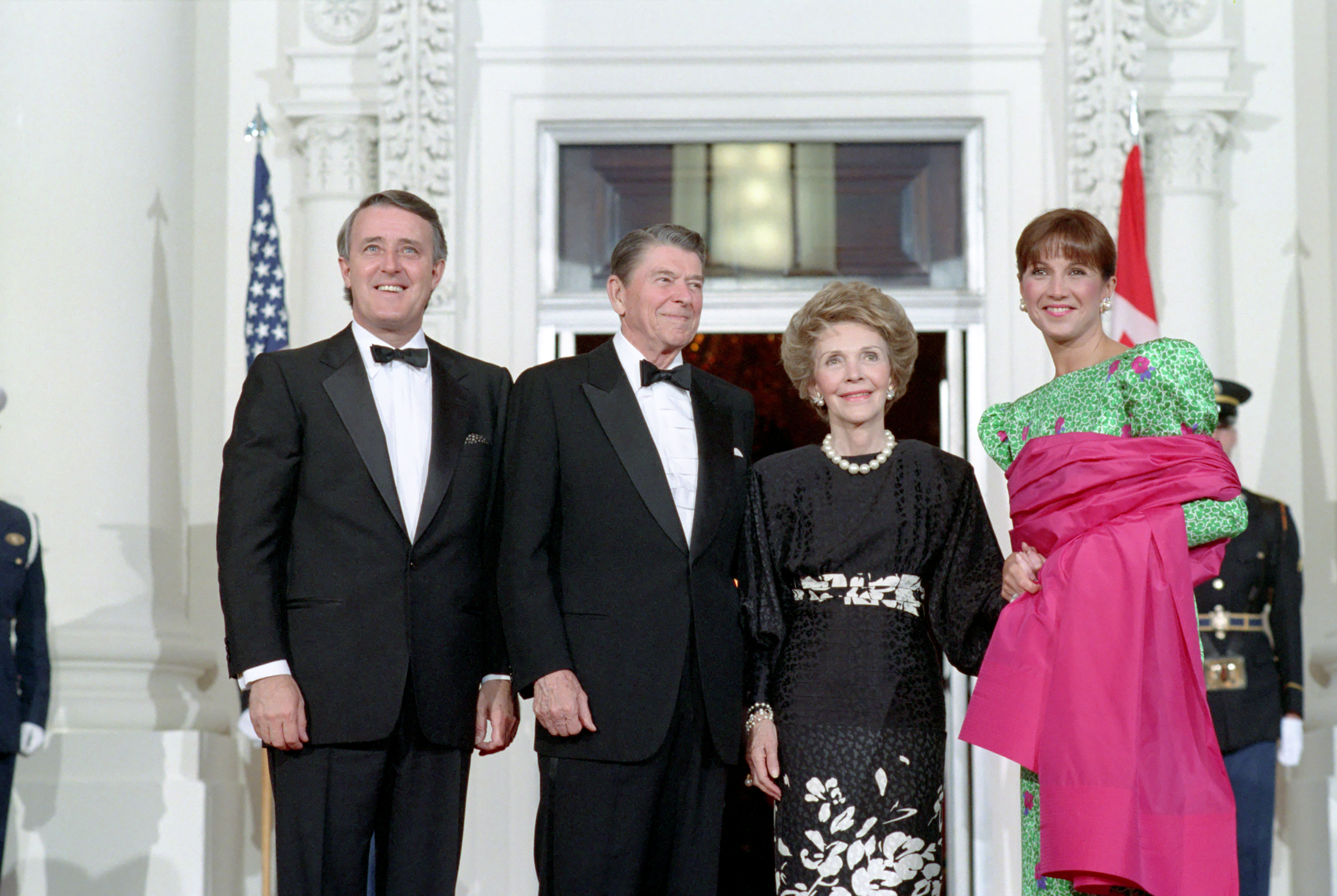

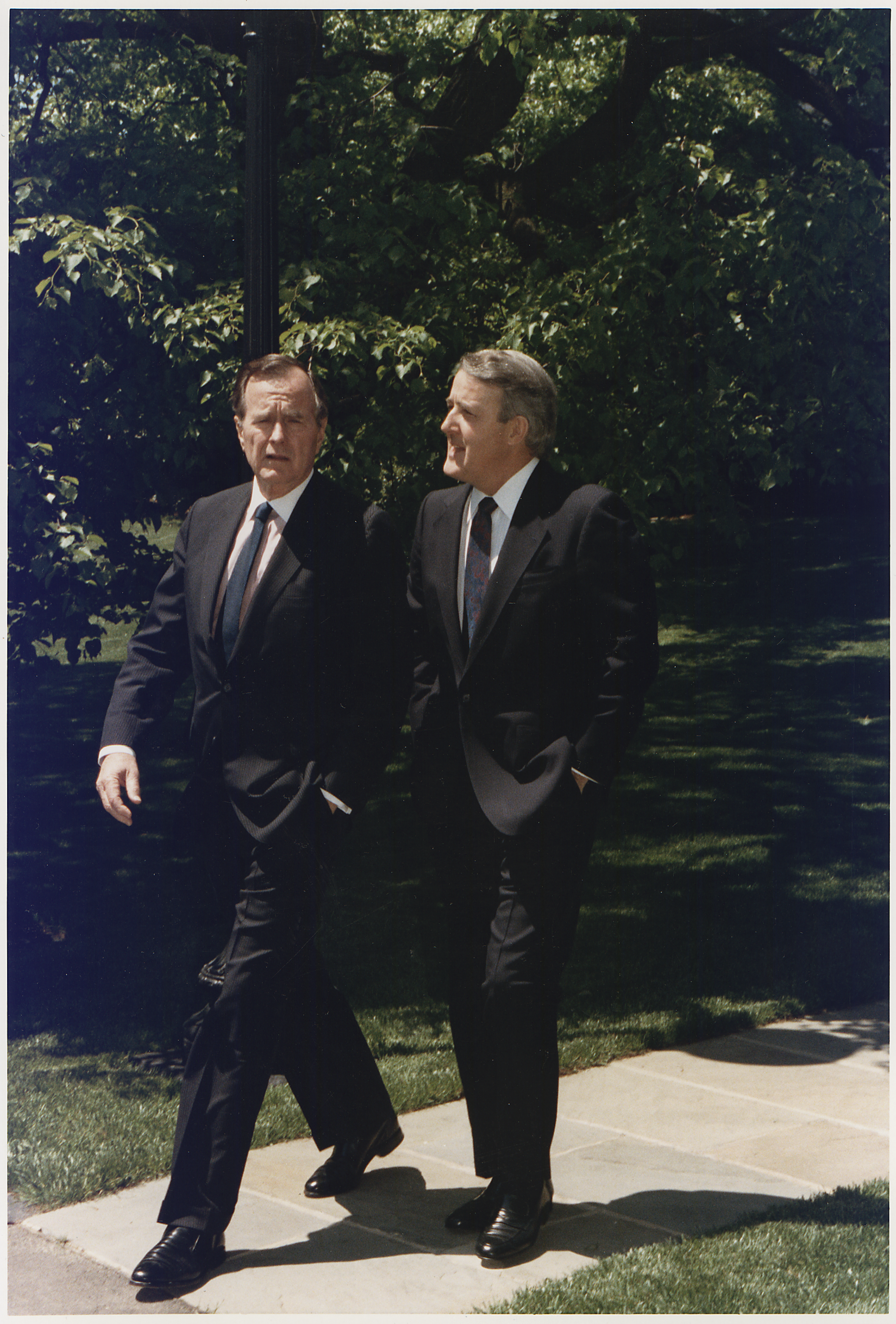

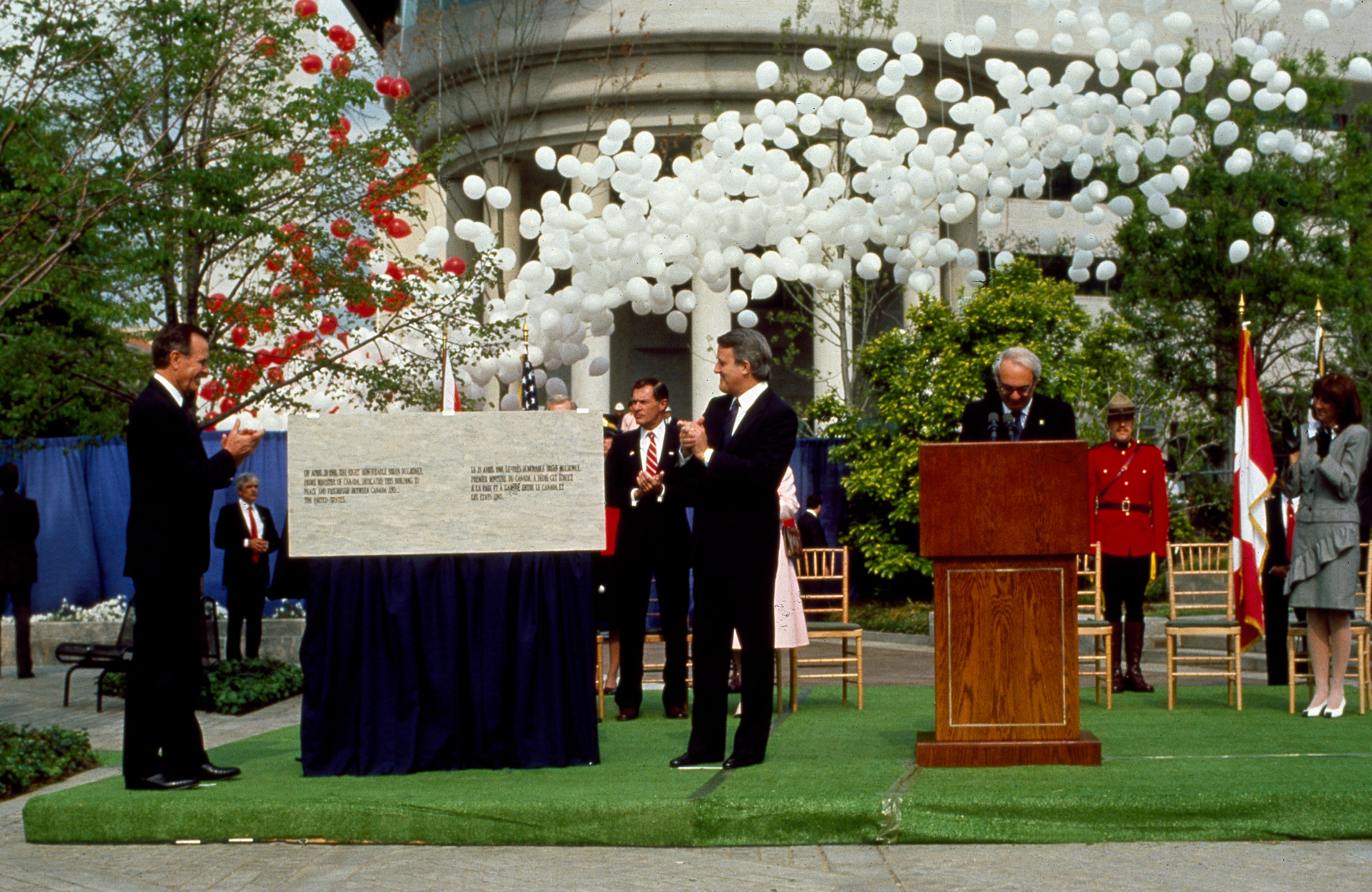

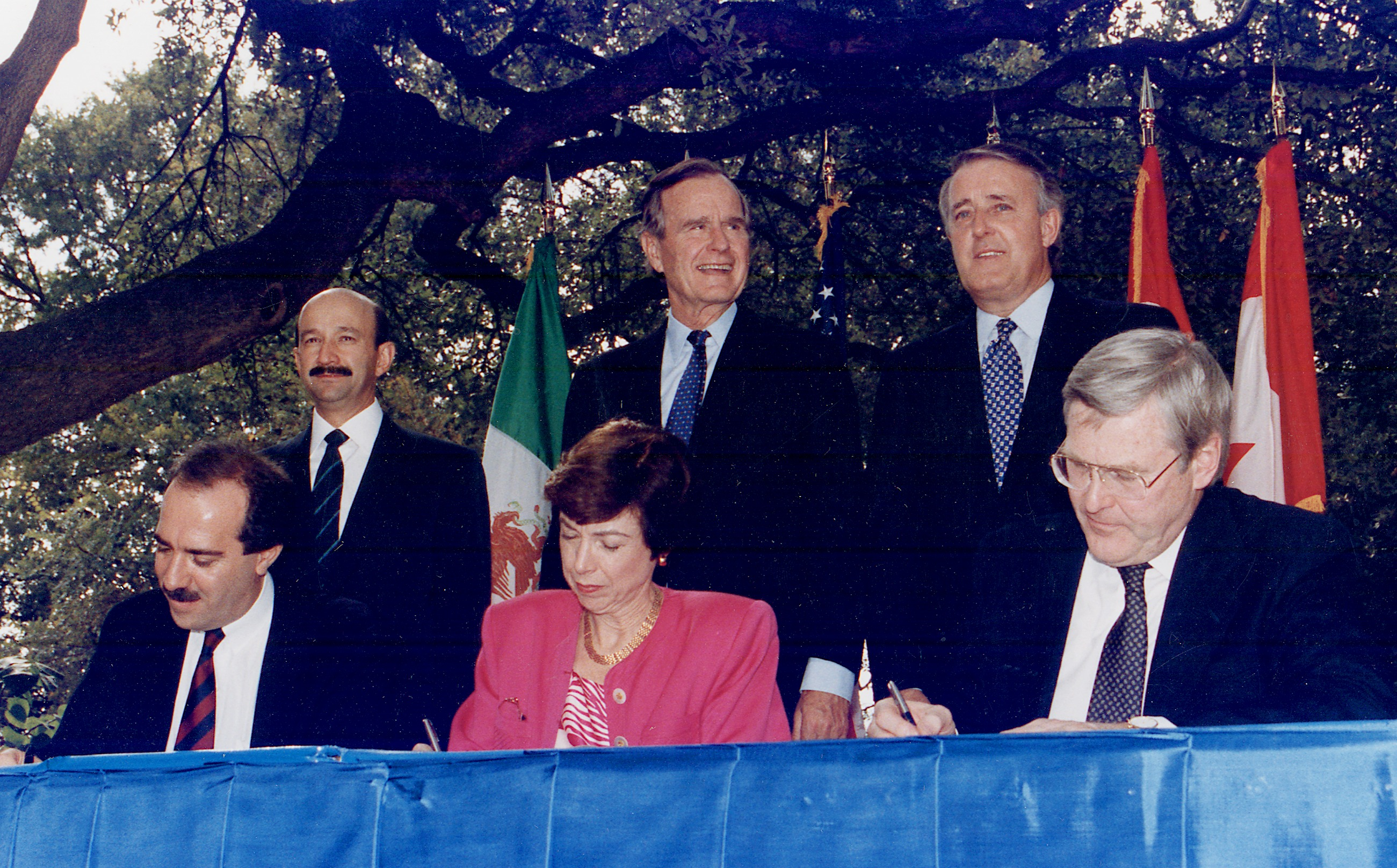

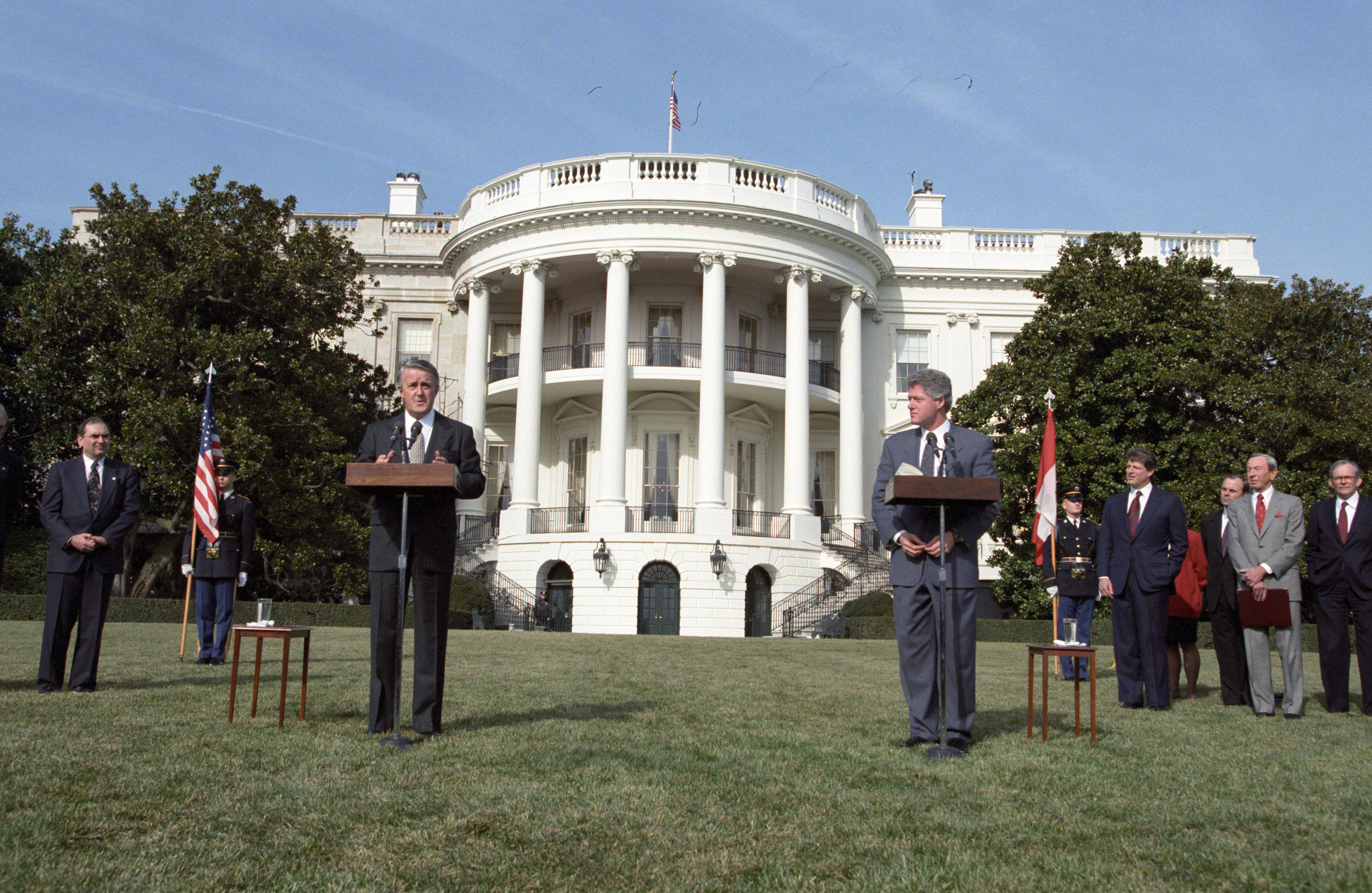

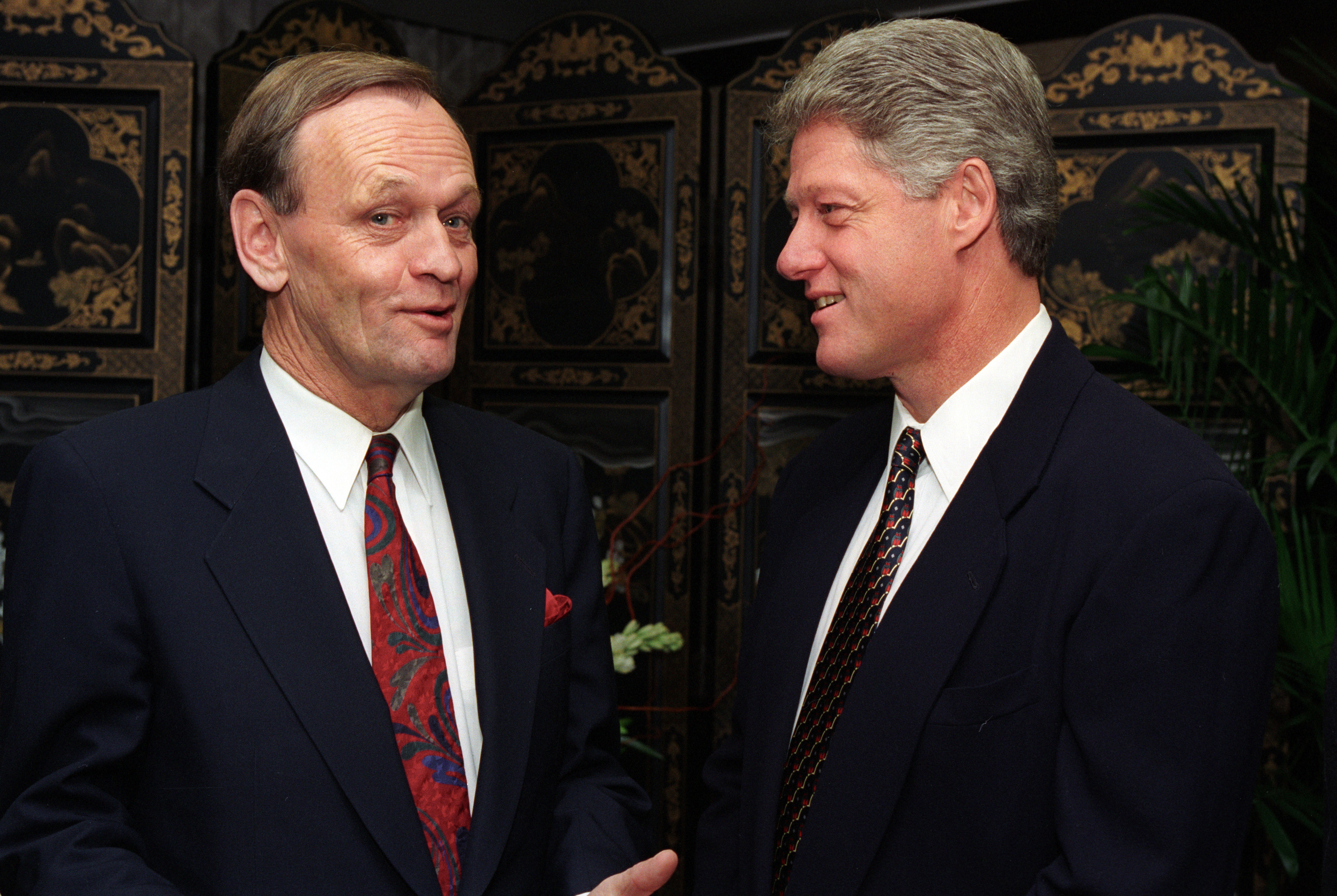

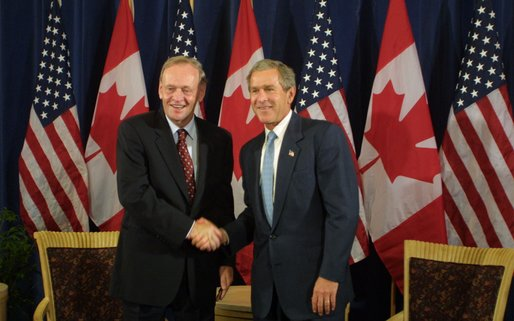

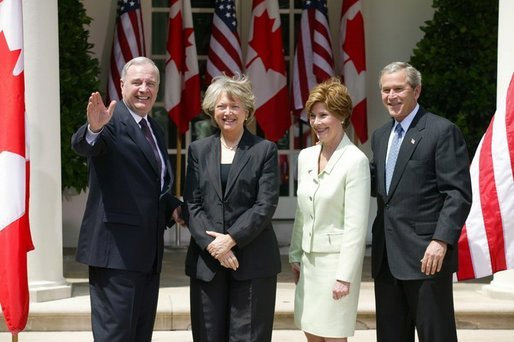

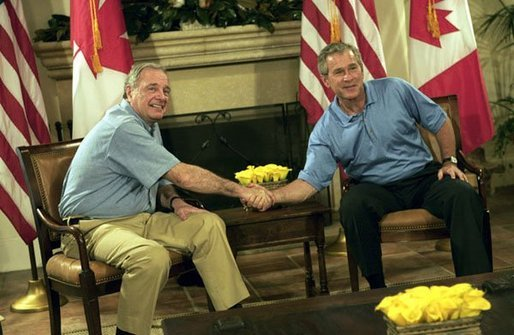

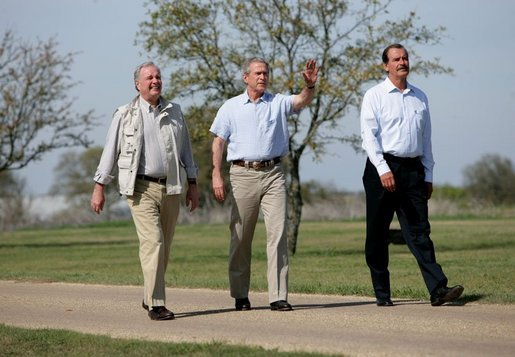

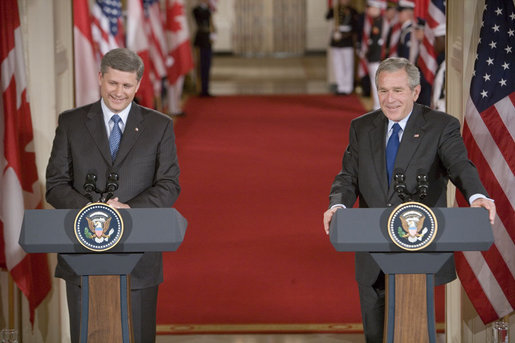

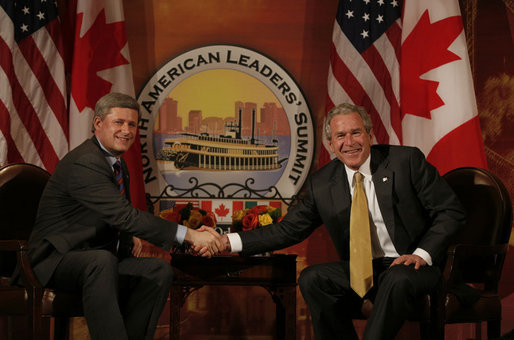

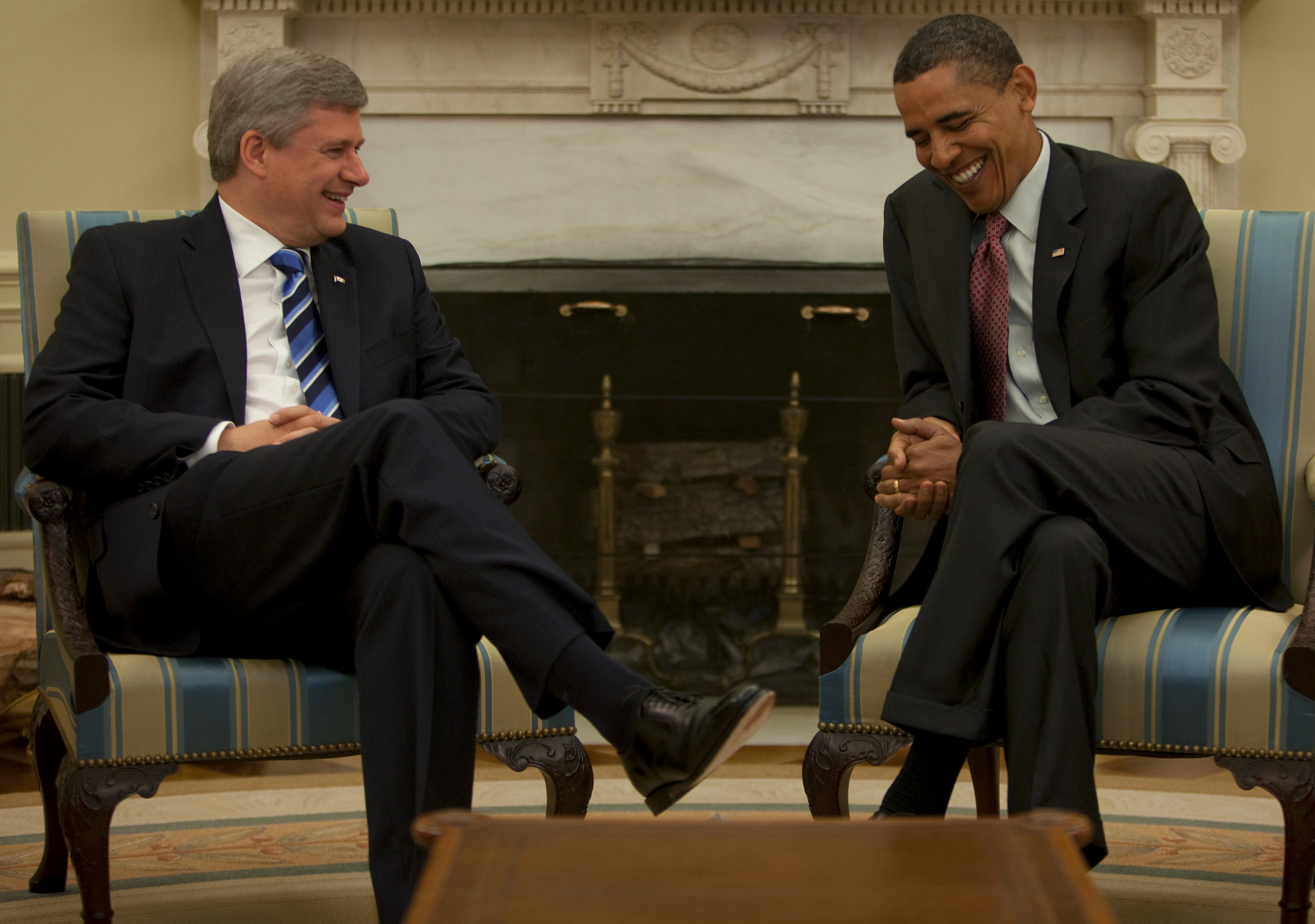

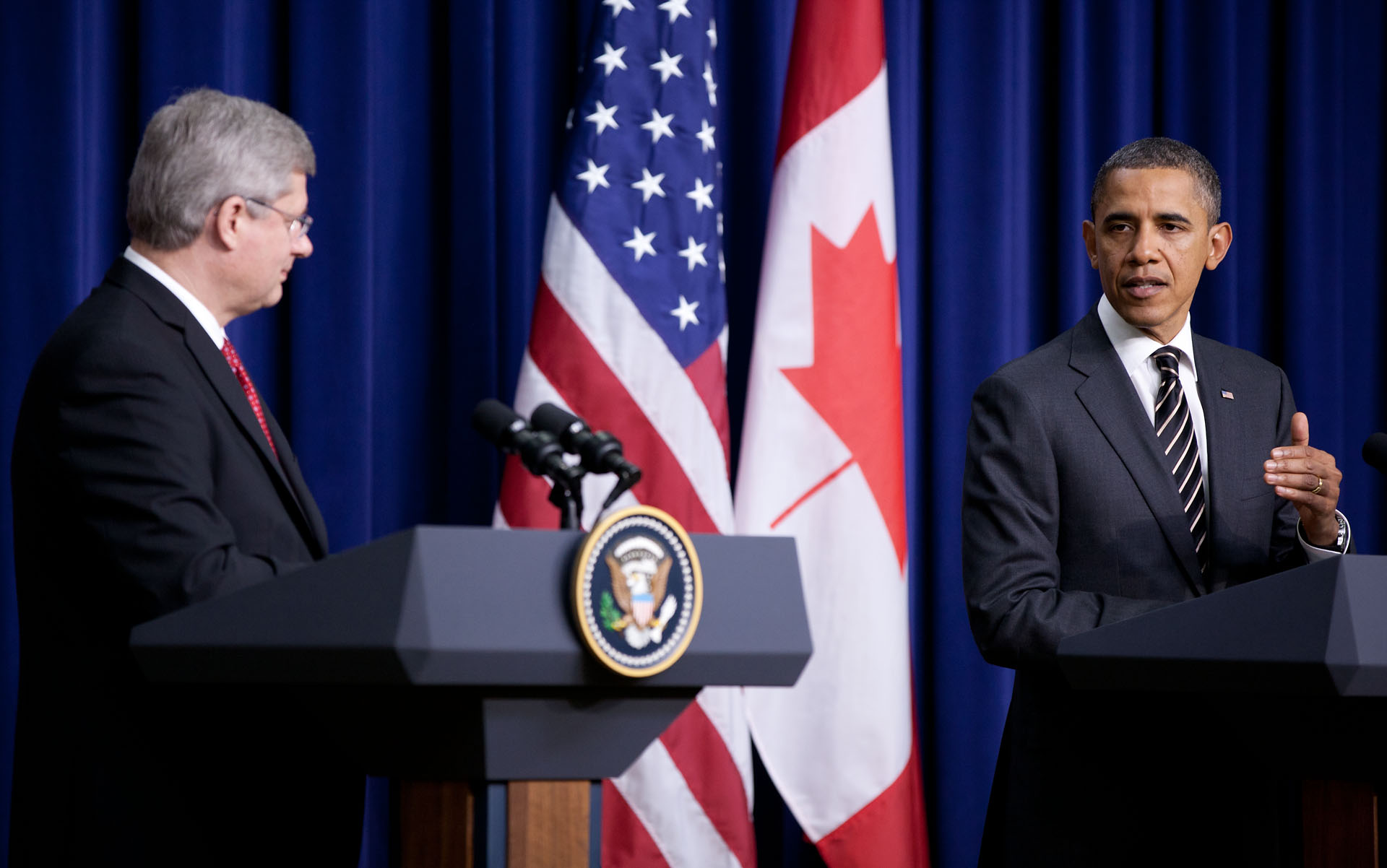

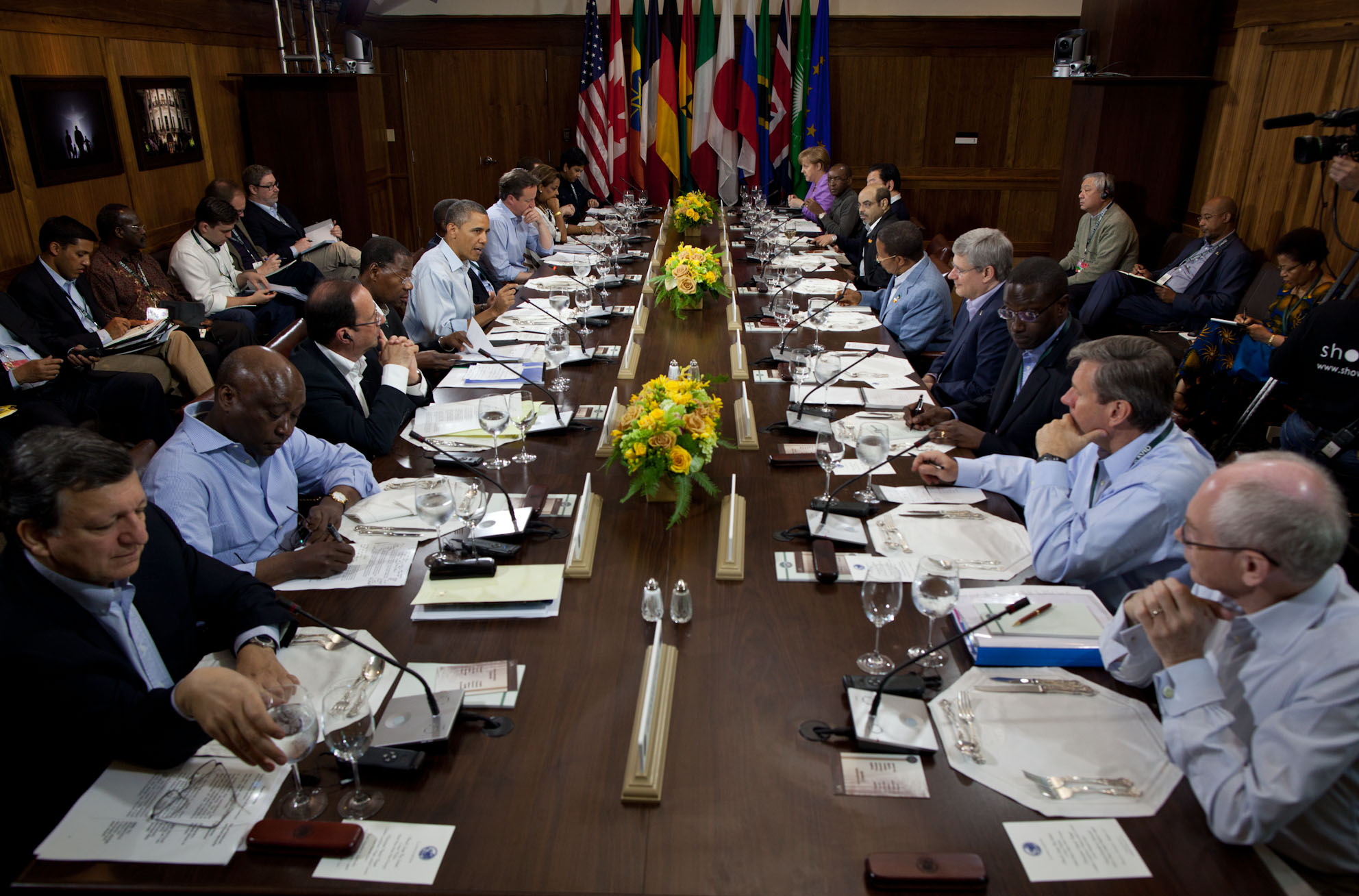

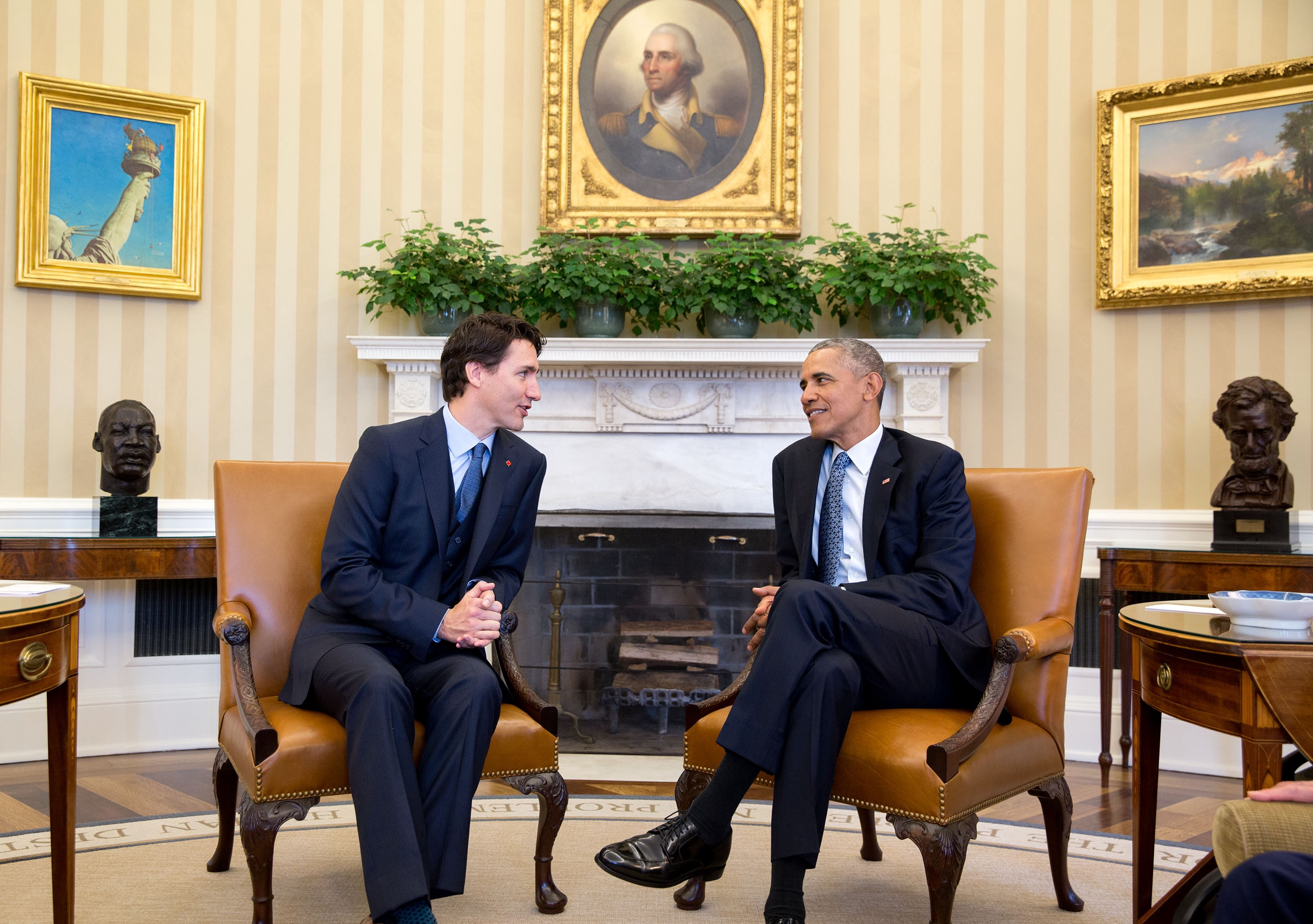

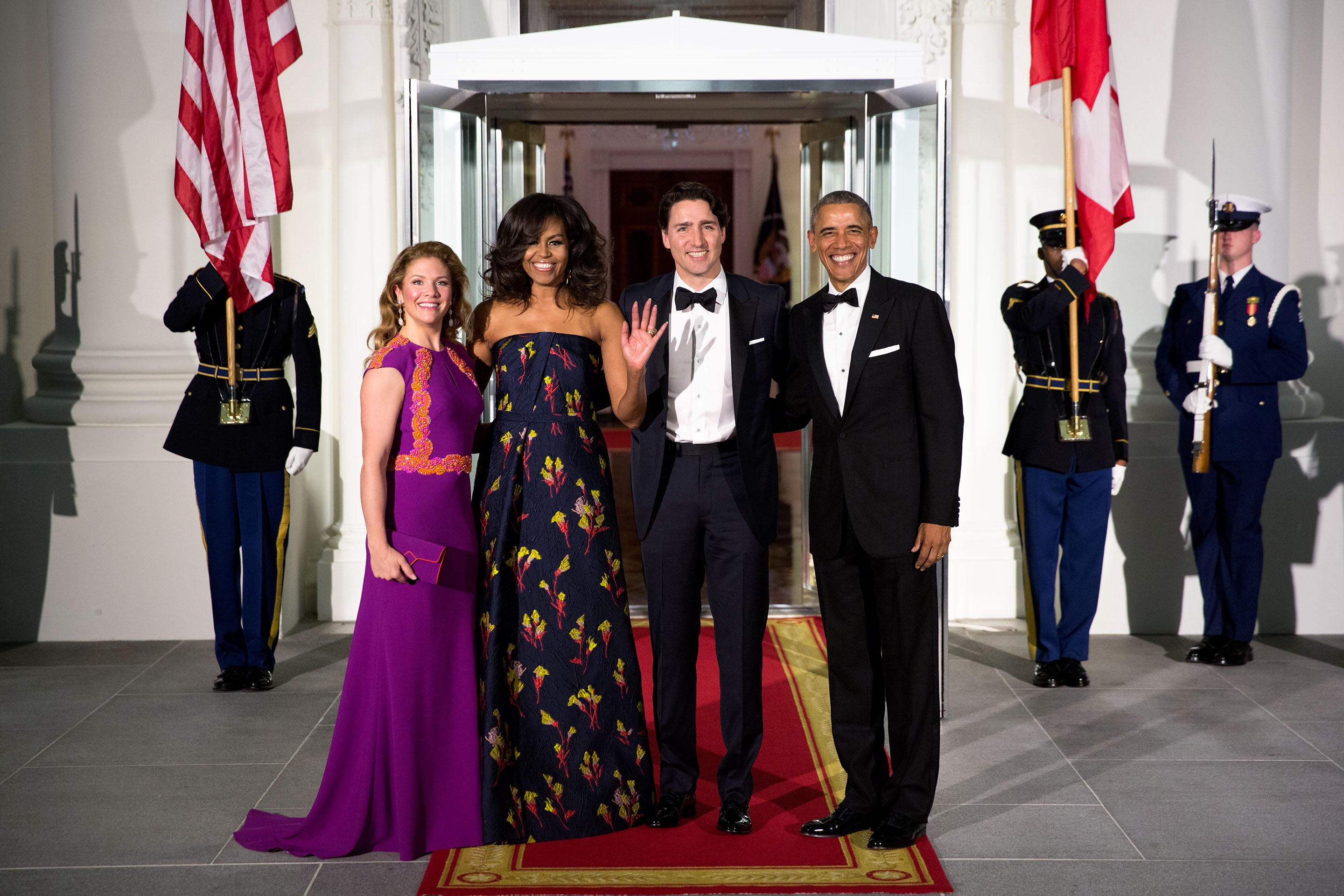

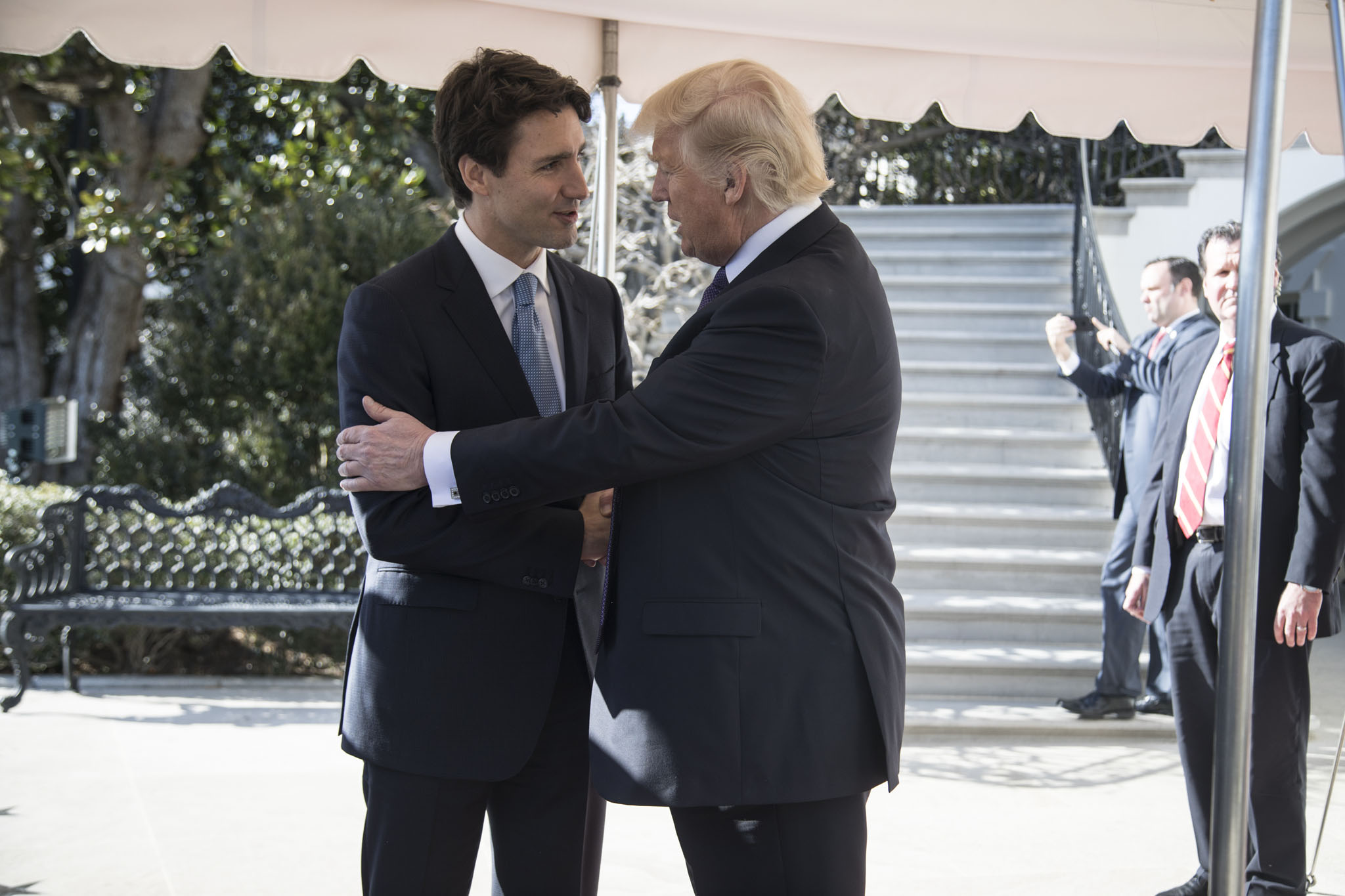

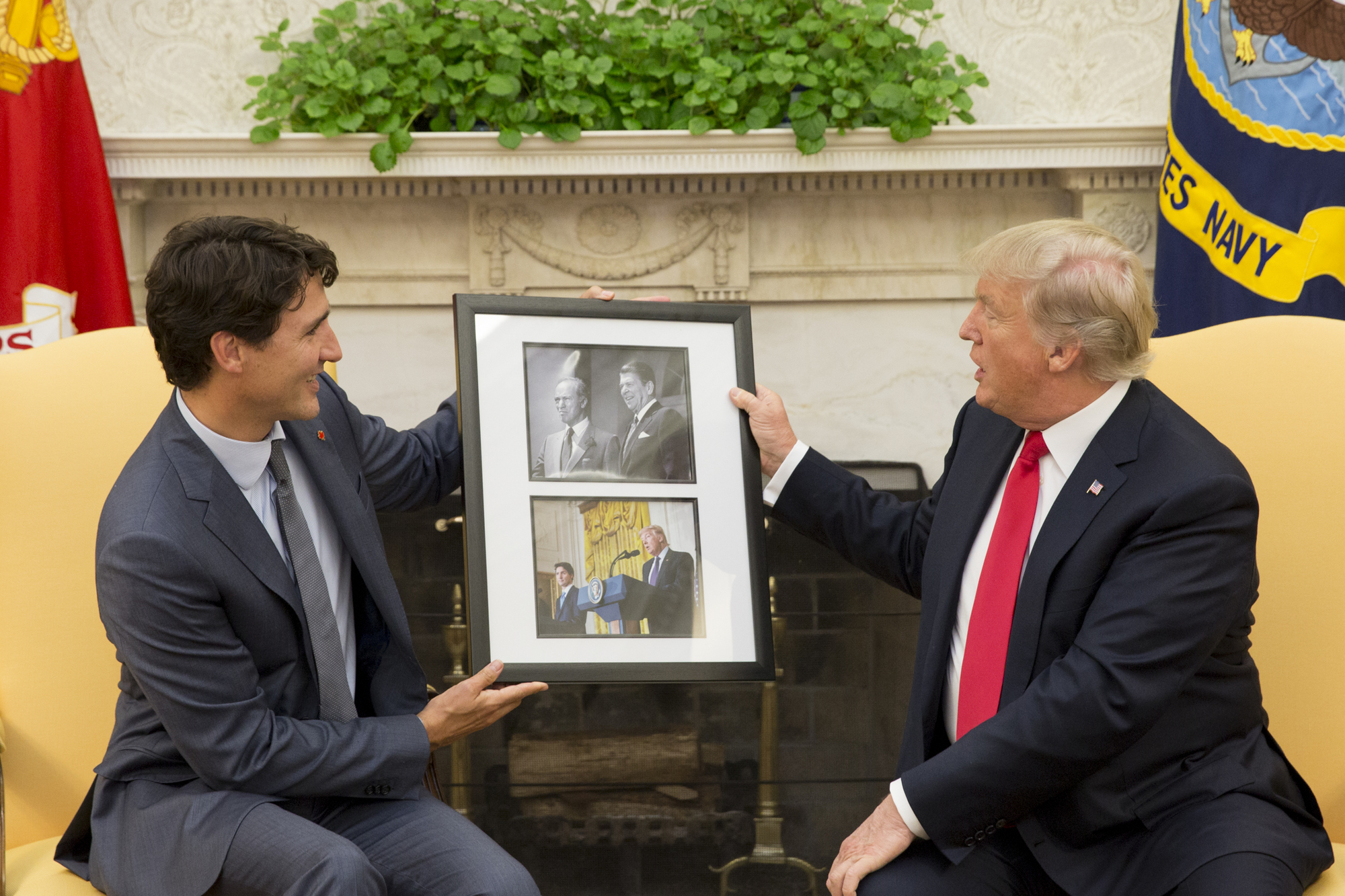

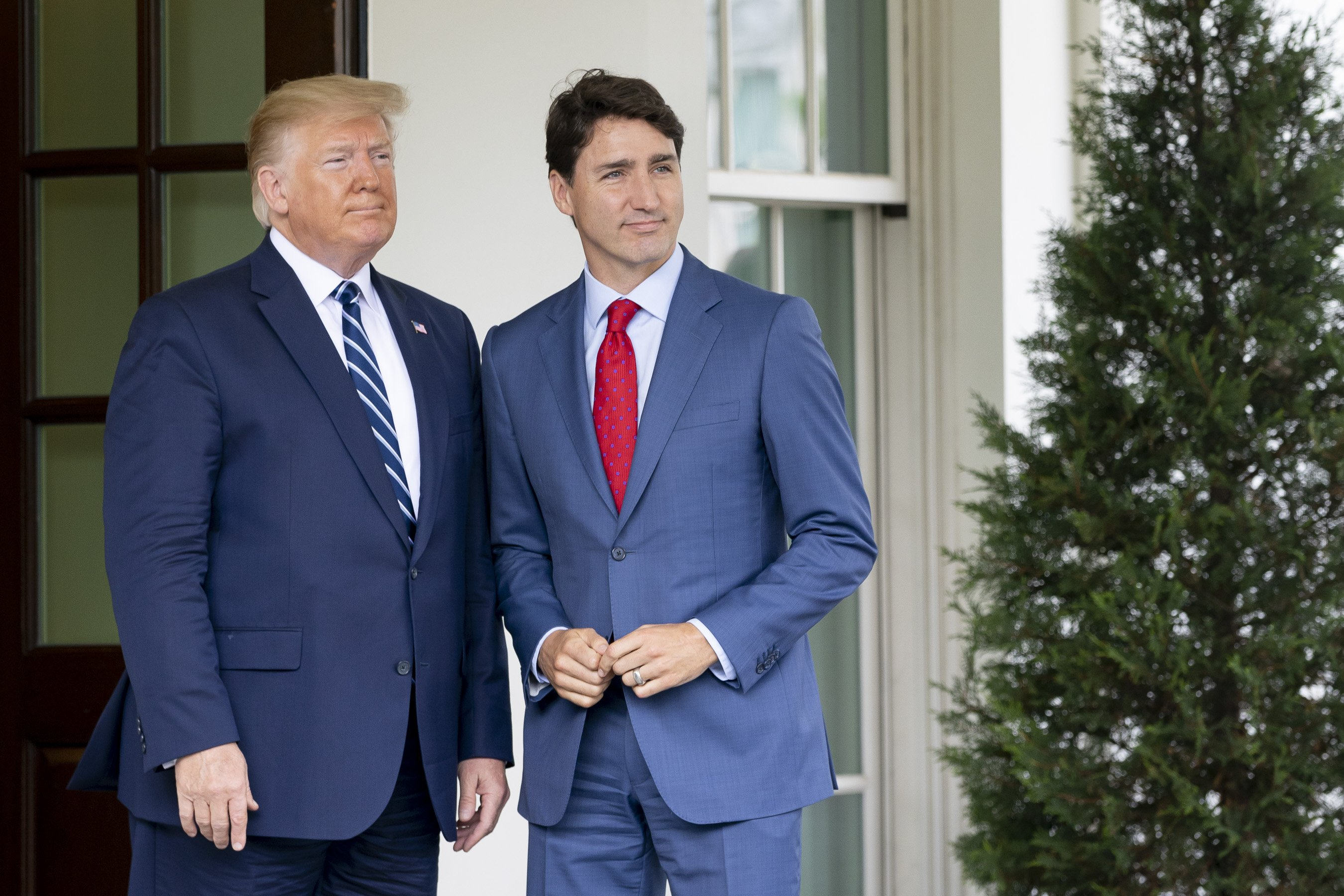

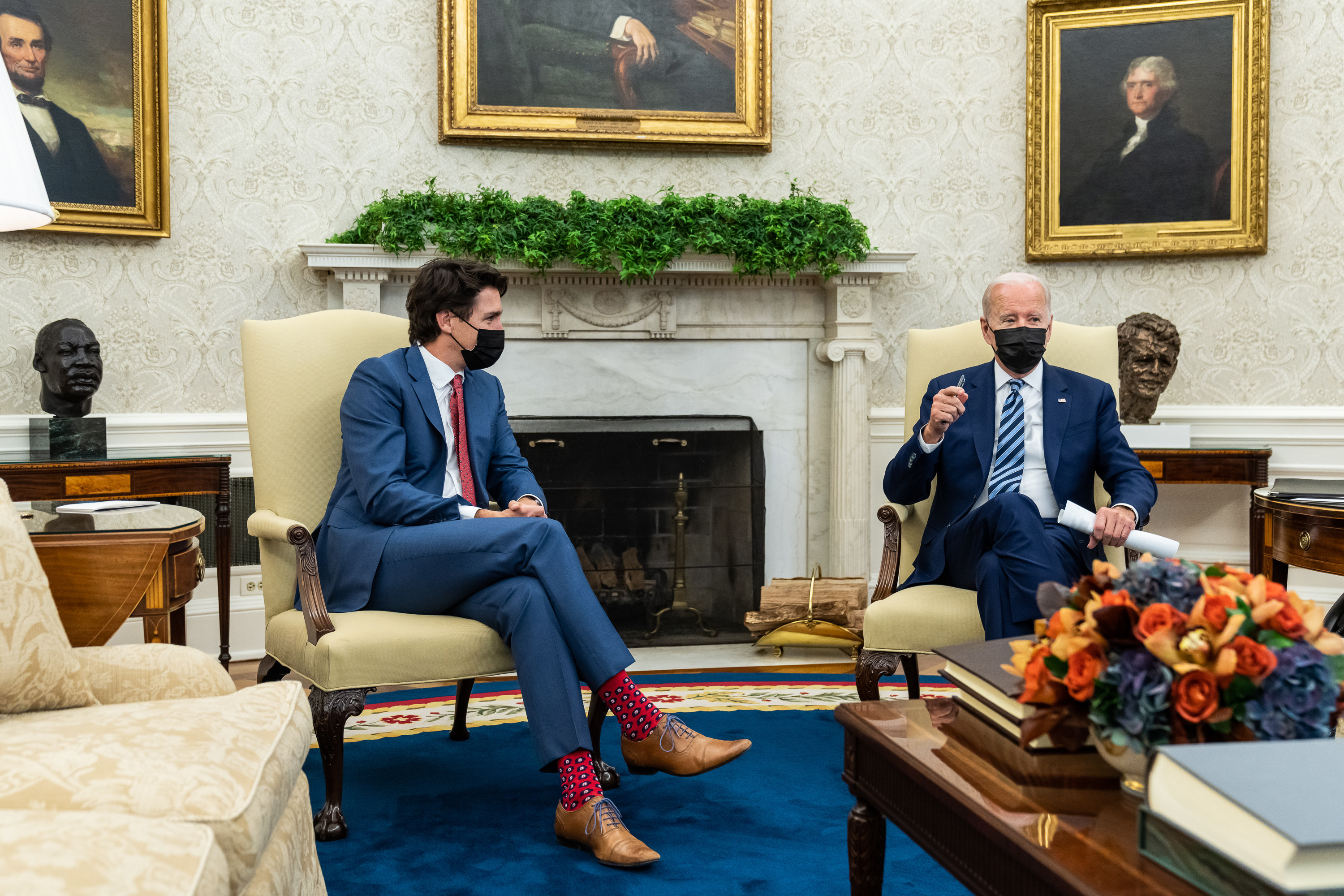

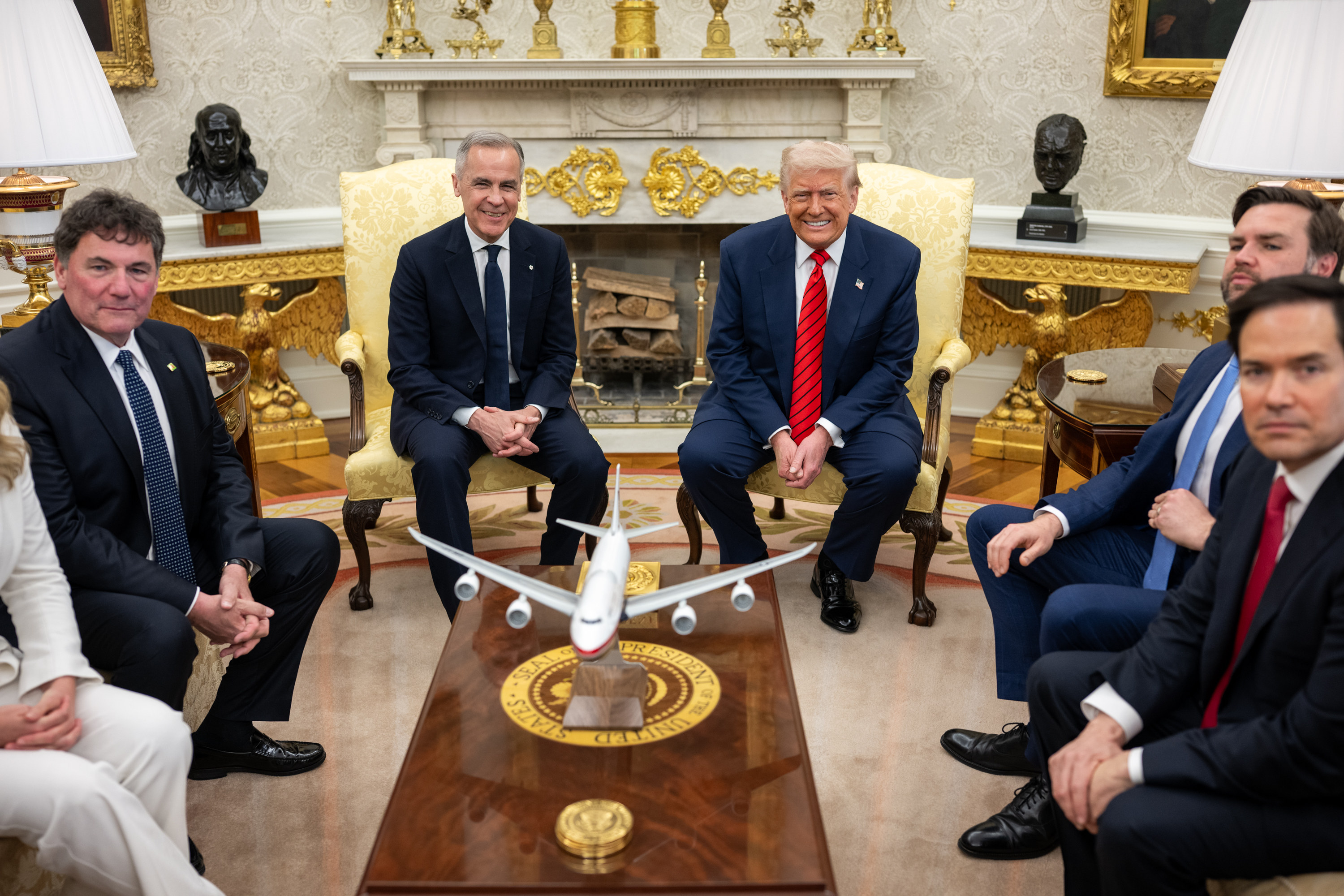

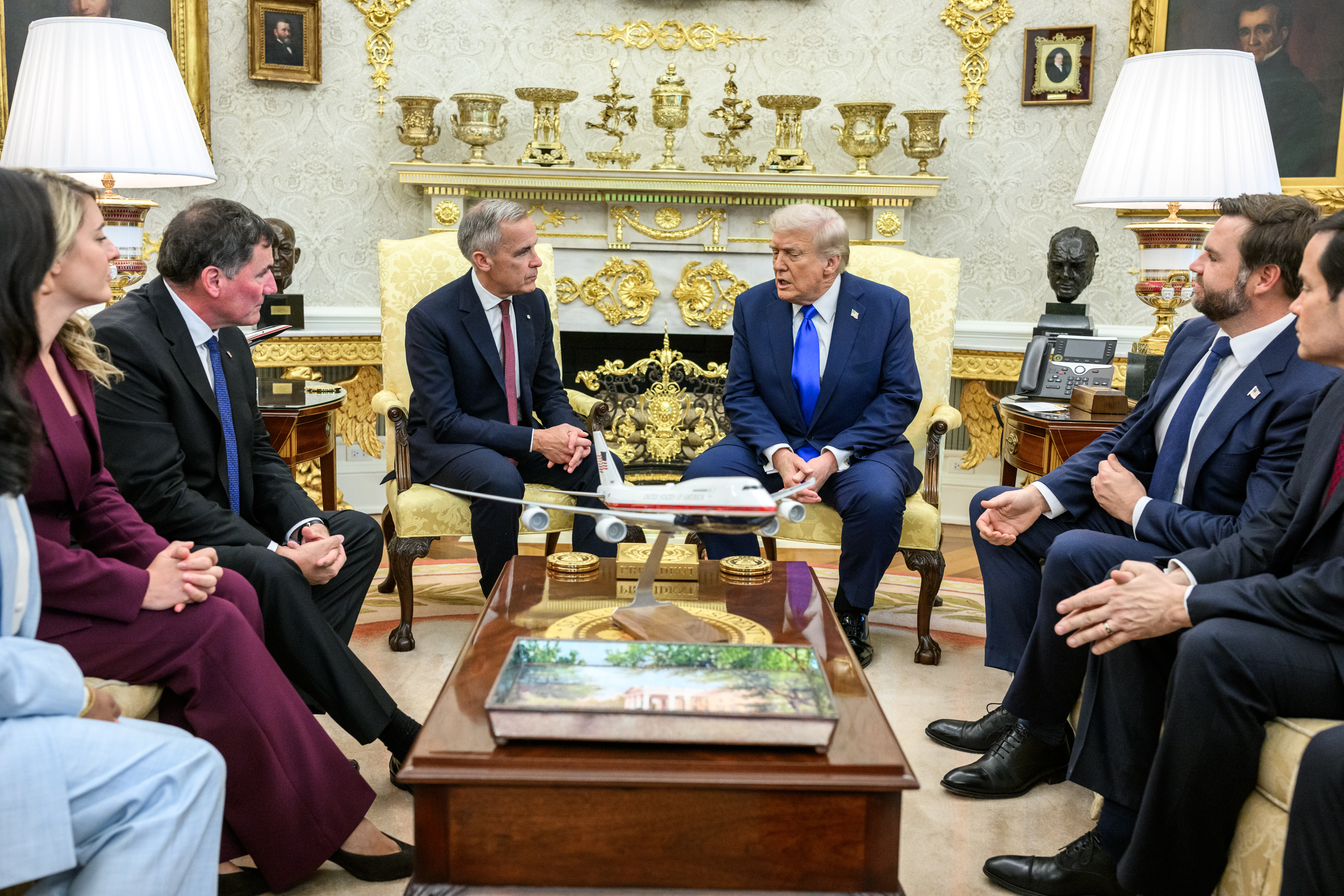

== Costa Rica ==
Table of Trips
Start	End	Guest	Title	Reason
March 25, 1940	March 28, 1940	Rafael Ángel Calderón Guardia	President	In U.S. March 24 – April 13, visited New York City, Chicago, Boston and Worcester
April 25, 1944	April 27, 1944	Teodoro Picado Michalski	President	Visited Washington, D.C. as guest of U.S. Government.
March 26, 1958	March 29, 1958	Mario Echandi Jiménez	President	At the invitation of the President. In U.S. March 25–31. Also visited New Orleans and New York City.
June 30, 1964	July 2, 1964	Francisco Orlich Bolmarcich	President	Official visit. In U.S. June 29 – July 11. Also visited Williamsburg, Kingsville, Philadelphia, New York City, and San Juan, Puerto Rico.
June 4, 1968	June 6, 1968	José Joaquín Trejos Fernández	President	Official visit. In U.S. June 3–7; visited Williamsburg, San Antonio, and Miami.
October 24, 1970	October 24, 1970	José Figueres Ferrer	President	Attended White House dinner on 25th Anniversary of the U.N.
September 6, 1977	September 9, 1977	Daniel Oduber Quiros	President	Attended signing of the Panama Canal Treaty.
November 29, 1980	December 1, 1980	Rodrigo Carazo Odio	President	Private visit. Met with President Carter December 1.
June 21, 1982	June 24, 1982	Luis Alberto Monge	President	Official working visit. Afterwards visited New York City.
November 3, 1982	November 5, 1982	Luis Alberto Monge	President	Informal visit. Addressed Conference on Free Elections. Met with President Reagan November 4.
April 14, 1985	April 15, 1985	Luis Alberto Monge	President	Private Visit. Met with President Reagan April 15.
December 3, 1986	December 6, 1986	Oscar Arias Sanchez	President	Official Working Visit. Private visit to Miami afterwards.
September 22, 1987	September 22, 1987	Oscar Arias Sanchez	President	Met with President Reagan during a private visit.
April 4, 1989	April 4, 1989	Oscar Arias Sanchez	President	Met with President Bush during a private visit.
May 20, 1990	May 20, 1990	Rafael Ángel Calderón Fournier	President	Private visit.
October 9, 1991	October 12, 1991	Rafael Ángel Calderón Fournier	President	Official working visit. Afterwards visited Fort Lauderdale
November 30, 1993	November 30, 1993	Rafael Ángel Calderón Fournier	President	Attended working brunch with President Clinton.
December 9, 1994	December 11, 1994	José María Figueres	President	Attended the Summit of the Americas in Miami
December 9, 1998	December 11, 1998	Miguel Ángel Rodríguez	President	Attended conference on Central American reconstruction at the Inter-American Development Bank. Private visit with President Clinton December 11.
May 6, 2000	May 10, 2000	Miguel Ángel Rodríguez	President	Working visit.
July 11, 2001	July 14, 2001	Miguel Ángel Rodríguez	President	Working visit.
April 10, 2003	April 10, 2003	Abel Pacheco	President	Working visit. Discussed negotiations for a Central American Free Trade Agreement.
May 10, 2005	May 12, 2005	Abel Pacheco	President	Working visit. Discussed negotiations for a Central American Free Trade Agreement.
December 3, 2006	December 6, 2006	Oscar Arias Sanchez	President	Working visit.
September 24, 2008	September 24, 2008	Oscar Arias Sanchez	President	Met with President Bush at the Council of the Americas in New York City.
June 8, 2022	June 10, 2022	Rodrigo Chaves Robles	President	Attended the Summit of the Americas in Los Angeles, California.
August 29, 2023	August 29, 2023	Rodrigo Chaves Robles	President	Official Working Visit.
November 2, 2023	November 2, 2023	Rodrigo Chaves Robles	President	Attended the APEP Leaders' Summit.

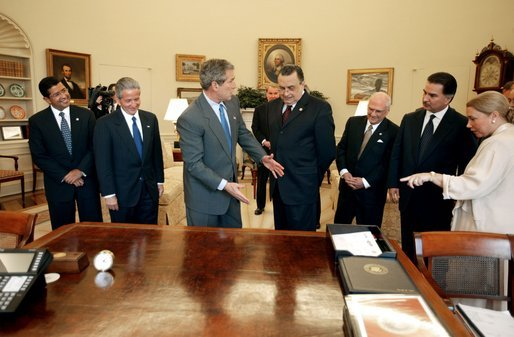

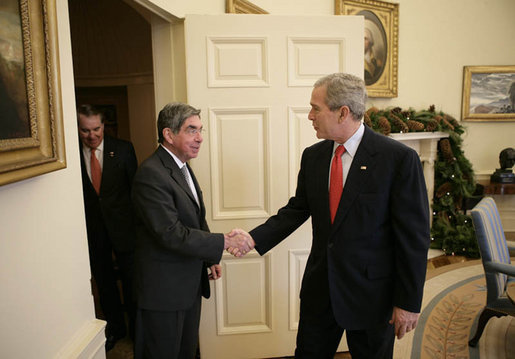

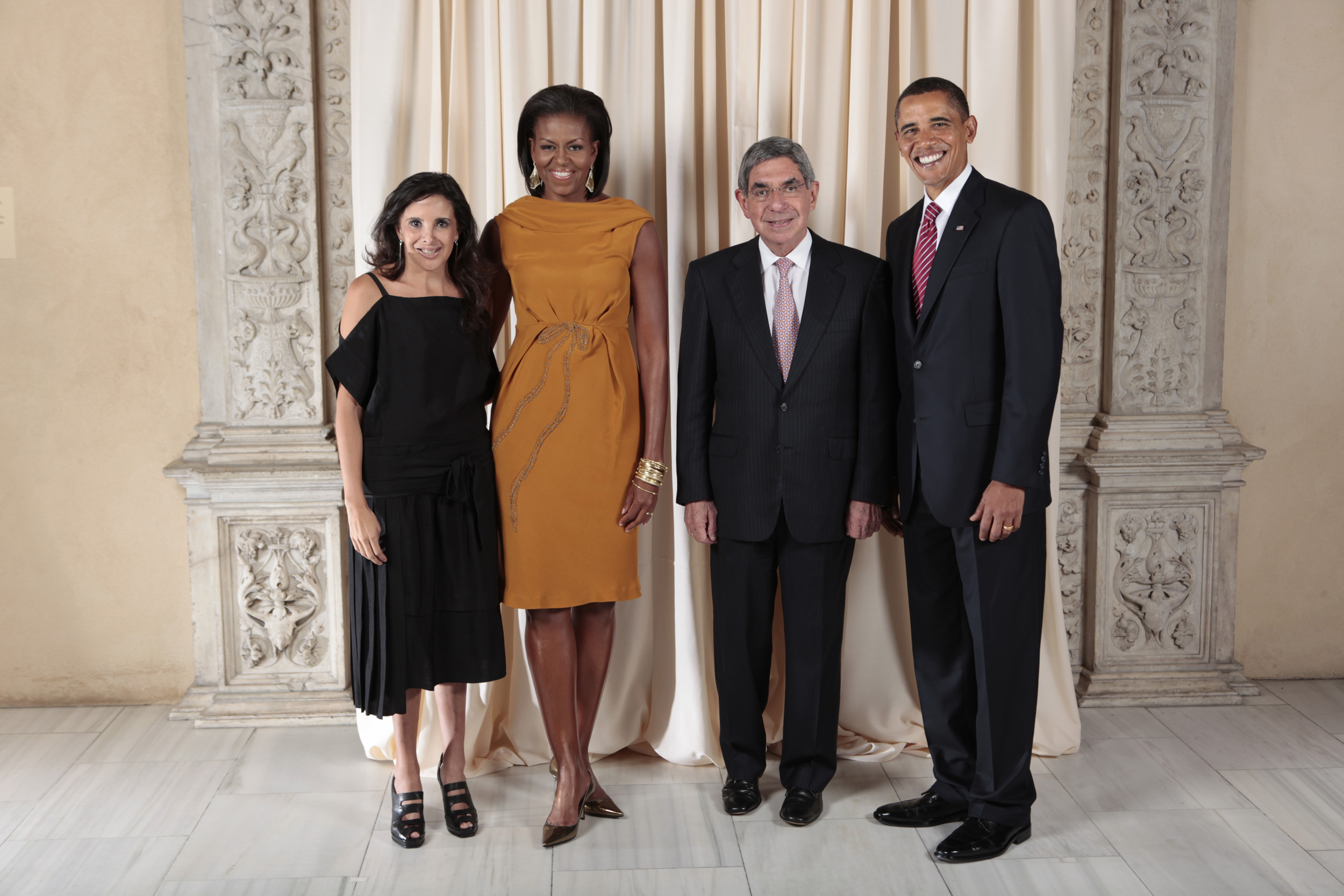

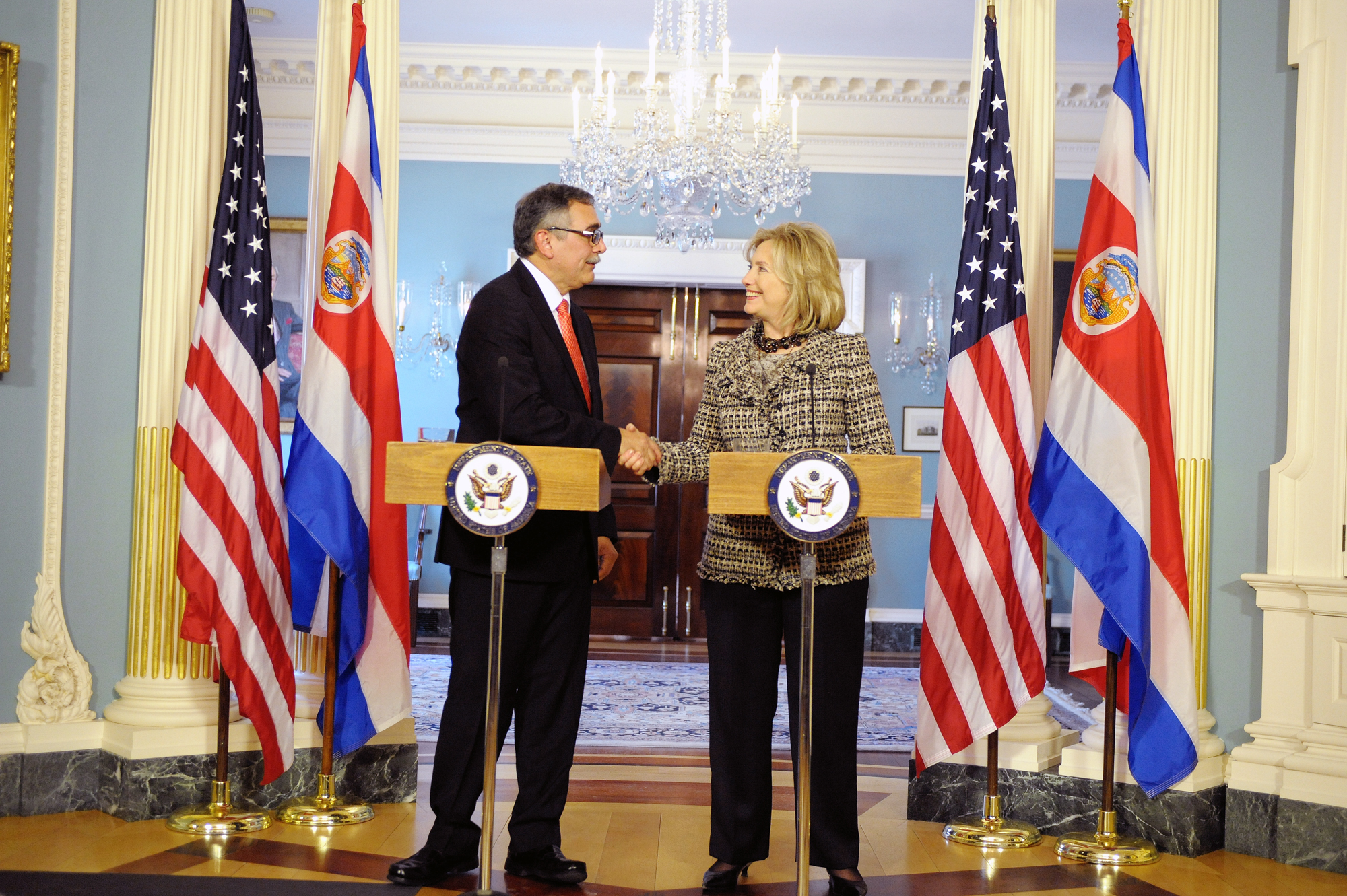

== Cuba ==
Table of Trips
Start	End	Guest	Title	Reason
April 15, 1925	April 15, 1925	Gerardo Machado	President	Visited Florida and New York City.
April 22, 1927	April 25, 1927	Gerardo Machado	President	In U.S. April 20 – May 7, visiting New York City, Chicago, and Atlanta
April 21, 1936	April 23, 1936	Miguel Mariano Gómez	President	Afterwards visited New York City. Departed U.S. April 30.
December 8, 1942	December 12, 1942	Fulgencio Batista	President	Guest of U.S. Government on invitation of the President. In U.S. December 7–16, visiting New York City and Buffalo.
August 30, 1944	September 3, 1944	Ramón Grau	President	Afterwards visited New York City. Departed U.S. September 8.
December 8, 1948	December 10, 1948	Carlos Prío Socarrás	President	Also visited Annapolis and New York City. Departed U.S. December 12.
April 15, 1959	April 20, 1959	Fidel Castro	Prime Minister	Unofficial visit. Later visited New York City and Boston. Left U.S. April 26; stopped in Houston. April 27–28 after visiting Canada.
September 29, 2015	September 29, 2015	Raúl Castro	President	Met with President Obama at the UN General Assembly in New York City.

== Dominica ==
Table of Trips
Start	End	Guest	Title	Reason
October 25, 1983	November 6, 1983	Eugenia Charles	Prime Minister	Private visit. Met with President Reagan October 25.
1.-Feb.1984	February 6, 1984	Eugenia Charles	Prime Minister	Private visit. Met with President Reagan October 25.
July 17, 1984	July 19, 1984	Eugenia Charles	Prime Minister	Attended meeting of Caribbean Heads of Government in Charleston. Met with President Reagan July 19.
September 16, 1994	September 16, 1994	Eugenia Charles	Prime Minister	Discussed the despatch of a multinational force to Haiti.
December 9, 1994	December 11, 1994	Eugenia Charles	Prime Minister	Attended the Summit of the Americas in Miami.

== Dominican Republic ==
Table of Trips
Start	End	Guest	Title	Reason
January 4, 1963	January 10, 1963	Juan Bosch	President	Private visit.
September 6, 1977	September 9, 1977	Joaquin Balaguer	President	Attended signing of the Panama Canal Treaty.
July 14, 1982	July 16, 1982	Salvador Jorge Blanco	President	Private visit. Met with President Reagan July 15.
April 9, 1984	April 11, 1984	Salvador Jorge Blanco	President	State visit; visited Springfield, Chicago, New York City, Columbia. Departed U.S. April 14.
March 24, 1988	March 25, 1988	Joaquín Balaguer	President	Official Working Visit. Private visit afterwards to Boston and Texas.
December 9, 1994	December 11, 1994	Joaquín Balaguer	President	Attended the Summit of the Americas in Miami
June 10, 1998	June 10, 1998	Leonel Fernandez	President	Met with President Clinton during a private visit.
May 20, 2003	May 20, 2003	Hipólito Mejía	President	Working visit.
May 10, 2005	May 12, 2005	Leonel Fernandez	President	Working visit. Discussed Central American and Dominican Republic Free Trade Agreement.
October 24, 2006	October 27, 2006	Leonel Fernandez	President	Working visit.
September 24, 2008	September 24, 2008	Leonel Fernandez	President	Met with President Bush at the Council of the Americas in New York City.
July 12, 2010	July 12, 2010	Leonel Fernandez	President	Working visit.
March 22, 2019	March 22, 2019	Danilo Medina	President	Caribbean Leaders Conference at Mar-a-Lago, Florida.
June 8, 2022	June 10, 2022	Luis Abinader	President	Attended the Summit of the Americas in Los Angeles, California.
November 3, 2023	November 3, 2023	Luis Abinader	President	Attended the APEP Leaders' Summit.

== El Salvador ==
Table of Trips
Start	End	Guest	Title	Reason
March 10, 1959	March 13, 1959	José María Lemus	President	State visit. In U.S. March 9–21; visited Charlottesville, New York City, Springfield, Houston, and New Orleans. Addressed U.S. Congress March 11.
September 6, 1977	September 9, 1977	Carlos Humberto Romero	President	Attended signing of the Panama Canal Treaty.
September 19, 1981	October 1, 1981	José Napoleón Duarte	President	Private visit. Met with President Reagan September 21.
June 16, 1983	June 18, 1983	Álvaro Magaña	President	Official working visit.
May 24, 1984	May 24, 1984	José Napoleón Duarte	President	Private visit. Met with President Reagan.
July 23, 1984	July 23, 1984	José Napoleón Duarte	President	Private visit. Met with President Reagan.
May 15, 1985	May 18, 1985	José Napoleón Duarte	President	Private visit. Met with President Reagan.
October 30, 1985	October 31, 1985	José Napoleón Duarte	President	Private visit. Met with President Reagan.
October 13, 1987	October 18, 1987	José Napoleón Duarte	President	State Visit.
April 6, 1989	April 7, 1989	Alfredo Cristiani	President	Met with President Bush during a private visit.
February 1, 1990	February 1, 1990	Alfredo Cristiani	President	Private visit.
October 1, 1990	October 1, 1990	Alfredo Cristiani	President	Met with President Bush at the U.N. General Assembly.
May 11, 1991	May 13, 1991	Alfredo Cristiani	President	State Visit. Afterwards visited Miami.
September 23, 1991	September 23, 1991	Alfredo Cristiani	President	Met with President Bush at the U.N. General Assembly.
February 24, 1992	February 24, 1992	Alfredo Cristiani	President	Met with President Bush during a private visit.
November 30, 1993	November 30, 1993	Alfredo Cristiani	President	Attended working brunch with President Clinton.
December 9, 1994	December 11, 1994	Armando Calderón Sol	President	Attended the Summit of the Americas in Miami
December 9, 1998	December 11, 1998	Armando Calderón Sol	President	Attended conference on Central American reconstruction at the Inter-American Development Bank. Private visit with President Clinton December 11.
February 28, 2001	March 3, 2001	Francisco Flores Pérez	President	Private visit. Met with President Bush March 2.
April 10, 2003	April 10, 2003	Francisco Flores Pérez	President	Working visit. Discussed negotiations for a Central American Free Trade Agreement
May 25, 2004	May 27, 2004	Francisco Flores Pérez	President	Working visit.
July 12, 2004	July 13, 2004	Antonio Saca	President	Working visit.
May 10, 2005	May 12, 2005	Antonio Saca	President	Working visit. Discussed Central American and Dominican Republic Free Trade Agreement.
July 15, 2005	July 15, 2005	Antonio Saca	President	Working visit
February 23, 2006	February 25, 2006	Antonio Saca	President	Working visit
September 18, 2006	September 18, 2006	Antonio Saca	President	Met with President Bush at the UN General Assembly in New York City.
February 26, 2007	February 26, 2007	Antonio Saca	President	Working visit.
November 26, 2007	November 30, 2007	Antonio Saca	President	Working visit.
September 24, 2008	September 24, 2008	Antonio Saca	President	Met with President Bush at the Council of the Americas in New York City. Discussed temporary protected status for Salvadorans in the United States.
December 14, 2008	December 16, 2008	Antonio Saca	President	Working visit.
March 8, 2010	March 8, 2010	Mauricio Funes	President	Working visit.
July 25, 2014	July 25, 2014	Salvador Sánchez Cerén	President	Discussed migration of unaccompanied minors.
September 26, 2019	September 26, 2019	Nayib Bukele	President	Met with President Trump at the U.N. General Assembly.
February 2021	February 2021	Nayib Bukele	President	Private visit.
August 29, 2023	August 29, 2023	Nayib Bukele	President	Private visit.
September 19, 2023	September 19, 2023	Nayib Bukele	President	Spoke at the U.N. General Assembly.
February 22, 2024	February 22, 2024	Nayib Bukele	President	Private visit.
September 20, 2024	September 24, 2024	Nayib Bukele	President	Private visit. Spoke at the U.N. General Assembly.
April 12, 2025	April 14, 2025	Nayib Bukele	President	Met with President Trump.
February 5, 2026	February 6, 2026	Nayib Bukele	President	Private visit.
March 7, 2026	March 7, 2026	Nayib Bukele	President	Attended the Shield of the Americas Summit.

== Grenada ==
Table of Trips
Start	End	Guest	Title	Reason
September 6, 1977	September 9, 1977	Eric Gairy	Prime Minister	Attended signing of the Panama Canal Treaty.
July 17, 1984	July 19, 1984	Nicholas Brathwaite	Chairman	Attended meeting of Caribbean Heads of Government in Charleston. Met with President Reagan July 19.
October 21, 1985	October 26, 1985	Herbert Blaize	Prime Minister	Private Visit. Met with President Reagan October 22.
December 9, 1994	December 11, 1994	Nicholas Brathwaite	Prime Minister	Attended the Summit of the Americas in Miami
September 24, 2003	September 24, 2003	Keith Mitchell	Prime Minister	Met with President Bush at the UN General Assembly in New York City.
June 11, 2004	June 11, 2004	Keith Mitchell	Prime Minister	Attended the funeral of Former President Reagan.
October 7, 2008	October 9, 2008	Tillman Thomas	Prime Minister	Working visit.

== Guatemala ==
Table of Trips
Start	End	Guest	Title	Reason
July 19, 1882	July 21, 1882	Justo Rufino Barrios	President	Sought help in settling a boundary dispute with Mexico. Arrived in U.S. July 11.
October 10, 1955	November 3, 1955	Carlos Castillo Armas	President	Official visit. Afterwards visited New York City, St. Louis, Houston, and New Orleans. Departed U.S. November 13.
February 23, 1958	February 25, 1958	Miguel Ydígoras Fuentes	President	Also visited Houston. Departed U.S. February 26.
September 6, 1977	September 9, 1977	Kjell Eugenio Laugerud García	President	Attended signing of the Panama Canal Treaty.
May 12, 1987	May 15, 1987	Vinicio Cerezo	President	Official Working Visit.
March 2, 1989	March 2, 1989	Vinicio Cerezo	President	Met with President Bush during a private visit.
September 25, 1989	September 25, 1989	Vinicio Cerezo	President	Met with President Bush at the U.N. General Assembly.
October 2, 1991	October 2, 1991	Jorge Serrano Elías	President	Met with President Bush during a private visit.
November 30, 1993	November 30, 1993	Ramiro de León Carpio	President	Attended working brunch with President Clinton.
December 9, 1994	December 11, 1994	Ramiro de León Carpio	President	Attended the Summit of the Americas in Miami
December 9, 1998	December 11, 1998	Luis Alberto Flores Asturias	President	Attended conference on Central American reconstruction at the Inter-American Development Bank. Private visit with President Clinton December 11.
July 1, 2001	July 6, 2001	Alfonso Portillo	President	Working visit.
April 10, 2003	April 10, 2003	Alfonso Portillo	President	Working visit. Discussed negotiations for a Central American Free Trade Agreement.
April 28, 2004	May 4, 2004	Óscar Berger	President	Working visit.
May 10, 2005	May 12, 2005	Óscar Berger	President	Working visit. Discussed Central American Free Trade Agreement.
April 30, 2008	April 30, 2008	Álvaro Colom	President	Working visit
September 24, 2008	September 24, 2008	Álvaro Colom	President	Met with President Bush at the Council of the Americas in New York City.
July 30, 2014	July 30, 2014	Otto Perez	President	Discussed migration of unaccompanied minors.
June 15, 2017	June 16, 2017	James Ernesto Morales	President	Attended the Conference on Prosperity and Security in Central America, in Washington and in Doral, Florida.
February 8, 2018	February 8, 2018	James Ernesto Morales	President	Bilateral Meeting (National Prayer Breakfast).
December 17, 2019	December 17, 2019	James Ernesto Morales	President	Working Visit.
March 25, 2024	March 25, 2024	Bernardo Arévalo	President	Official Visit.

== Haiti ==
Table of Trips
Start	End	Guest	Title	Reason
June 14, 1926	June 18, 1926	Louis Borno	President	In U.S. June 11–30, visiting New York City and Philadelphia
April 16, 1934	April 18, 1934	Sténio Vincent	President	Discussed political and economic relations. Arrived in U.S. March 26 for unofficial visit to New York City.
December 5, 1939	December 13, 1939	Sténio Vincent	President	Unofficial visit to Washington, D.C. and New York City.
April 22, 1941	May 1, 1941	Élie Lescot	President	Discussed economic assistance and Inter-American defense.
March 23, 1942	March 24, 1942	Élie Lescot	President	Signed agreements regarding economic and military assistance. In U.S. March 21 – April 9; visited New York City.
October 14, 1943	October 18, 1943	Élie Lescot	President	At invitation of the President. Discussed economic cooperation. Afterwards visited Baltimore, New York City, and Miami. Departed U.S. October
January 26, 1955	January 29, 1955	Paul Magloire	President	Official visit. Addressed U.S. Congress January 27. Afterwards visited West Point and New York City. After February 3 unofficially visited Nashville, Chicago and Boston.Departed U.S. February 9.
November 20, 1986	November 22, 1986	Henri Namphy	President	Private Visit. Met with President Reagan November 21.
May 24, 1990	May 24, 1990	Ertha Pascal-Trouillot	President	Private visit.
March 16, 1993	March 16, 1993	Jean-Bertrand Aristide	President	Met with President Clinton during a private visit.
December 1, 1993	December 7, 1993	Robert Malval	Prime Minister	Met with President Clinton during a private visit.
September 16, 1994	September 16, 1994	Jean-Bertrand Aristide	President	Met with President Clinton during a private visit.
December 9, 1994	December 11, 1994	Jean-Bertrand Aristide	President	Attended the Summit of the Americas in Miami
March 19, 1996	March 22, 1996	Rene Preval	President	Official working
February 3, 2000	February 4, 2000	Rene Preval	President	Met with President Clinton during a private visit; attended Congressional Prayer Breakfast.
March 6, 2007	March 11, 2007	Rene Preval	President	Working visit.
March 9, 2010	March 10, 2010	Rene Preval	President	Working visit.
February 4, 2014	February 7, 2014	Michel Martelly	President	Working visit
March 22, 2019	March 22, 2019	Jovenel Moise	President	Caribbean Leaders Conference at Mar-a-Lago, Florida.

== Honduras ==
Table of Trips
Start	End	Guest	Title	Reason
November 30, 1962	December 1, 1962	Ramón Villeda Morales	President	Informal visit. In U.S. November 29 – December 5. Also visited Williamsburg, and made a private visit to Miami.
September 9, 1977	September 6, 1977	Juan Alberto Melgar Castro	President	Attended signing of the Panama Canal Treaty.
March 2, 1980	March 4, 1980	Policarpo Paz García	President	Private visit. Met with President Carter March 3.
July 13, 1982	July 15, 1982	Roberto Suazo Córdova	President	Official working visit.
May 20, 1985	May 22, 1985	Roberto Suazo Córdova	President	Official Working Visit. Private visit to Houston afterward.
May 26, 1986	May 29, 1986	José Azcona del Hoyo	President	Official working visit.
October 21, 1987	October 21, 1987	José Azcona del Hoyo	President	Met with President Reagan during a private visit.
April 17, 1990	April 19, 1990	Rafael Leonardo Callejas	President	Official working visit. Private visit to New York City afterwards.
6..May.1992	May 8, 1992	Rafael Leonardo Callejas	President	Met with President Bush during a private visit.
November 30, 1993	November 30, 1993	Rafael Leonardo Callejas	President	Attended working brunch with President Clinton.
December 9, 1994	December 11, 1994	Carlos Roberto Reina	President	Attended the Summit of the Americas in Miami
December 9, 1998	December 11, 1998	Carlos Roberto Flores	President	Attended conference on Central American reconstruction at the Inter-American Development Bank. Private visit with President Clinton December 11.
April 10, 2003	April 10, 2003	Ricardo Maduro	President	Working visit. Discussed negotiations for a Central American Free Trade Agreement
May 10, 2005	May 12, 2005	Ricardo Maduro	President	Working visit. Discussed negotiations for a Central American Free Trade Agreement
June 4, 2006	June 6, 2006	Manuel Zelaya	President	Working visit.
September 18, 2006	September 18, 2006	Manuel Zelaya	President	Met with President Bush at the UN General Assembly in New York City
September 24, 2008	September 24, 2008	Manuel Zelaya	President	Met with President Bush at the Council of the Americas in New York City
October 5, 2011	October 5, 2011	Porfirio Lobo	President	Working visit.
July 25, 2014	July 25, 2014	Juan Orlando Hernandez	President	Discussed migration of unaccompanied minors.
June 15, 2017	June 16, 2017	Juan Orlando Hernandez	President	Attended the Conference on Prosperity and Security in Central America, in Washington and in Doral, Florida.

== Jamaica ==
Table of Trips
Start	End	Guest	Title	Reason
November 24, 1963	November 25, 1963	Alexander Bustamante	Prime Minister	Attended funeral of President Kennedy.
October 13, 1967	October 14, 1967	Hugh Shearer	Prime Minister	Informal visit. In U.S. October 7–14; visited New York City.
June 7, 1968	June 7, 1968	Hugh Shearer	Prime Minister	Informal visit.
August 11, 1970	August 11, 1970	Hugh Shearer	Prime Minister	Private visit.
October 24, 1970	October 24, 1970	Hugh Shearer	Prime Minister	Attended White House dinner on 25th Anniversary of the U.N.
December 16, 1977	December 16, 1977	Michael Manley	Prime Minister	Private visit.
January 27, 1981	January 29, 1981	Edward Seaga	Prime Minister	Official visit.
February 21, 1983	February 23, 1983	Edward Seaga	Prime Minister	Private visit. Met with President Reagan
November 5, 1983	November 8, 1983	Edward Seaga	Prime Minister	Private visit. Met with President Reagan
July 17, 1984	July 19, 1984	Edward Seaga	Prime Minister	Attended meeting of Caribbean Heads of Government in Charleston. Met with President Reagan July 19.
May 2, 1990	May 4, 1990	Michael Manley	Prime Minister	Official working visit. Private visit to New York City afterwards.
May 15, 1991	May 15, 1991	Michael Manley	Prime Minister	Met with President Bush during a private visit.
March 24, 1992	March 25, 1992	Michael Manley	Prime Minister	Met with President Bush during a private visit.
August 30, 1993	August 30, 1993	P. J. Patterson	Prime Minister	Attended a CARICOM working luncheon.
December 9, 1994	December 11, 1994	P. J. Patterson	Prime Minister	Attended the Summit of the Americas in Miami
September 11, 1995	September 13, 1995	P. J. Patterson	Prime Minister	Working visit.
March 22, 2019	March 22, 2019	Andrew Holness	Prime Minister	Caribbean Leaders Conference at Mar-a-Lago, Florida.
June 8, 2022	June 10, 2022	Andrew Holness	Prime Minister	Attended the Summit of the Americas in Los Angeles, California.

== Mexico ==
Table of Trips
Start	End	Guest	Title	Reason
March 16, 1909	March 16, 1909	Porfirio Díaz	President	Visited El Paso in an exchange of visits with President Taft.
March 31, 1924	November 2, 1924	Plutarco Elías Calles	President	In U.S. October 26 – November 5; visited New Orleans
December 26, 1929	December 29, 1929	Pascual Ortiz Rubio	President	In U.S. December 4, 1929 – January 16, 1930, visiting Houston, Hot Springs, New York City, Baltimore, Buffalo, Detroit, Chicago, Kansas City, and San Francisco
April 21, 1943	April 21, 1943	Avila Camacho	President	Visited Corpus Christi in exchange of visits with President Roosevelt.
April 29, 1947	May 7, 1947	Miguel Alemán Valdés	President	Official visit. Addressed Joint Session of U.S. Congress May 1. Afterwards visited New York City, Chattanooga, and Kansas City
March 19, 1953	March 19, 1953	Ruiz Cortines	President	Met with President Eisenhower in Texas for dedication of Falcon Dam.
March 26, 1956	March 28, 1956	Ruiz Cortines	President	Attended a Heads of Government meeting in White Sulphur Springs
March 9, 1959	March 12, 1959	Lopez Mateos	President	State visit. Afterwards visited Chicago and New York City. After visiting Canada (October 15–18), visited Austin and the LBJ Ranch. Departed U.S. October 19.
September 25, 1964	September 25, 1964	Lopez Mateos	President	At El Paso, marking settlement of Chamizal dispute
November 12, 1964	November 12, 1964	Gustavo Díaz Ordaz	President	Informal visit at LBJ Ranch
March 26, 1967	March 28, 1967	Gustavo Díaz Ordaz	President	State visit at Washington, D.C. and El Paso . Addressed Joint Session of U.S. Congress October 27.
December 13, 1968	December 13, 1968	Gustavo Díaz Ordaz	President	Official visit for opening of Lopez Mateo Channel of Rio Grande, El Paso, Texas.
September 3, 1970	September 3, 1970	Gustavo Díaz Ordaz	President	Met with President Nixon in Coronado
November 13, 1970	November 13, 1970	Luis Echeverría Álvarez	President	Informal visit.
June 14, 1972	June 17, 1972	Luis Echeverría Álvarez	President	State visit. Addressed U.S. Congress June 15. visited Key Biscayne, New York City, Chicago, and San Antonio. Departed U.S. June 21.
March 21, 1974	March 21, 1974	Luis Echeverría Álvarez	President	Met with President Ford at Tubac and Tucson, Arizona.
September 24, 1976	September 24, 1976	The José López Portillo	President	Official visit.
February 14, 1977	February 16, 1977	The José López Portillo	President	State visit. In U.S. February 13–17; visited Williamsburg and Chicago.
September 28, 1979	September 29, 1979	The José López Portillo	President	Official visit.
June 7, 1981	June 9, 1981	The José López Portillo	President	Official working visit.
September 17, 1981	September 18, 1981	The José López Portillo	President	Informal meeting at the dedication of the Gerald R. Ford Presidential Museum, Grand Rapids
March 8, 1982	March 8, 1982	Miguel de la Madrid	President	Informal meeting with President Reagan at Coronado
14.1984	May 17, 1984	Miguel de la Madrid	President	State visit.
August 12, 1986	August 14, 1986	Miguel de la Madrid	President	Official Working Visit.
November 22, 1988	November 22, 1988	Carlos Salinas de Gortari	President	Met with President-elect Bush in Houston.
March 1, 1989	March 4, 1989	Carlos Salinas de Gortari	President	State visit. Addressed Joint meeting of U.S. Congress October 4; visited New York City and Providence. Departed U.S. October 6.
June 10, 1990	June 12, 1990	Carlos Salinas de Gortari	President	Private visit. Also addressed Business Roundtable.
September 30, 1990	September 30, 1990	Carlos Salinas de Gortari	President	Met with President Bush at the U.N. General Assembly.
April 7, 1991	April 7, 1991	Carlos Salinas de Gortari	President	Informal meeting with President Bush in Houston while en route to Canada.
December 13, 1991	December 14, 1991	Carlos Salinas de Gortari	President	Met with President Bush during a private visit. Discussed North American Free Trade Agreement at Camp David
February 27, 1992	February 27, 1992	Carlos Salinas de Gortari	President	Attended Drug Summit in San Antonio
July 14, 1992	July 14, 1992	Carlos Salinas de Gortari	President	Met with President Bush in San Diego
March 7, 1992	March 7, 1992	Carlos Salinas de Gortari	President	Attended the initialling of the North American Free Trade Agreement in San Antonio
January 8, 1993	January 8, 1993	Carlos Salinas de Gortari	President	Discussed NAFTA with President-elect Clinton in Austin
November 22, 1994	November 23, 1994	Ernesto Zedillo	President	Met with President Clinton during a private visit.
December 9, 1994	December 11, 1994	Ernesto Zedillo	President	Attended the Summit of the Americas in Miami
March 9, 1995	March 11, 1995	Ernesto Zedillo	President	State visit.
November 13, 1997	November 14, 1997	Ernesto Zedillo	President	Official working visit.
June 8, 1998	June 8, 1998	Ernesto Zedillo	President	Met with President Clinton during a U.N. General Assembly Special Session on the Drug Problem in New York City.
June 8, 2000	June 9, 2000	Ernesto Zedillo	President	Official working visit.
August 23, 2000	August 25, 2000	Vicente Fox	President	Working visit. Afterwards visited Dallas
September 4, 2001	September 7, 2001	Vicente Fox	President	State Visit. Addressed joint session of Congress. Visited Toledo
March 4, 2001	March 4, 2001	Vicente Fox	President	Met with President Bush during a private visit.
March 5, 2004	March 6, 2004	Vicente Fox	President	Official select visit. Met with President Bush at Crawford.
March 23, 2005	March 23, 2005	Vicente Fox	President	Working visit.
November 8, 2006	November 9, 2006	Felipe Calderon	President	Working visit.
April 21, 2008	April 22, 2008	Felipe Calderon	President	Attended the North American Leaders' Summit in New Orleans.
September 24, 2008	September 24, 2008	Felipe Calderon	President	Met with President Bush at the Council of the Americas in New York City.
November 14, 2008	November 15, 2008	Felipe Calderon	President	Attended the G-20 Economic Summit meeting.
January 13, 2009	January 13, 2009	Felipe Calderon	President	Met with President Bush and with President-Elect Obama.
September 24, 2009	September 25, 2009	Felipe Calderon	President	Attended the G-20 Economic Summit in Pittsburgh.
12.Apr. 2010	April 13, 2010	Felipe Calderon	President	Attended the Nuclear Security Summit.
May 19, 2010	May 20, 2010	Felipe Calderon	President	State visit. Addressed joint session of Congress May 20.
March 3, 2011	March 3, 2011	Felipe Calderon	President	Working visit.
April 2, 2012	April 2, 2012	Felipe Calderon	President	Attended North American Leaders' Summit.
November 27, 2012	November 27, 2012	Enrique Peña Nieto	President	Working visit.
January 6, 2015	January 6, 2015	Enrique Peña Nieto	President	Official working visit.
March 31, 2016	April 1, 2016	Enrique Peña Nieto	President	Attended the Nuclear Security Summit.
July 22, 2016	July 22, 2016	Enrique Peña Nieto	President	Official working visit.
July 8, 2020	July 8, 2020	Andrés Manuel López Obrador	President	Official working visit.
November 18, 2021	November 18, 2021	Andrés Manuel López Obrador	President	Working visit; North American Leaders' Summit.
July 12, 2022	July 12, 2022	Andrés Manuel López Obrador	President	Working visit.
November 12, 2023	November 17, 2023	Andrés Manuel López Obrador	President	Attended the APEC Leaders' Summit at San Francisco, California.

== Panama ==
Table of Trips
Start	End	Guest	Title	Reason
October 15, 1920	October 16, 1920	Belisario Porras Barahona	President	
July 21, 1932	July 22, 1932	Harmodio Arias Madrid	President	Unofficial visit. In U.S. July 17–30; visited New York City.
October 9, 1933	October 11, 1933	Harmodio Arias Madrid	President	Discussed regulation of commerce in Canal Zone. In U.S. October 8–23.
September 28, 1953	October 1, 1953	Roberto Francisco Chiari Remón	President	Afterwards made an unofficial visit to New York City. Departed U.S. October 7.
June 12, 1962	June 14, 1962	Roberto Francisco Chiari Remón	President	Official visit. In U.S. June 11–16, visiting Miami, Williamsburg, and New York City.
October 24, 1970	October 25, 1970	Demetrio B. Lakas	President	Attended White House dinner on 25th Anniversary of the U.N; met privately with President Nixon October 25.
October 6, 1977	October 9, 1977	Omar Torrijos	Head of State (de facto)	Attended signing of the Panama Canal Treaty.
October 13, 1977	October 14, 1977	Omar Torrijos	Head of State (de facto)	Discussed ratification of the Panama Canal Treaty
May 8, 1979	May 11, 1979	Arístides Royo	President	Private visit. Met with President Carter May 10.
September 29, 1982	October 2, 1982	Ricardo de la Espriella	President	Official working visit.
July 24, 1984	July 29, 1984	Nicolás Ardito Barletta Vallarino	President	Private visit. Met with President Reagan July 27.
April 29, 1990	May 22, 1990	Guillermo Endara	President	Official working visit. Private visit to New York City afterwards.
November 30, 1993	November 30, 1993	Guillermo Endara	President	Attended working brunch with President Clinton.
December 9, 1994	December 11, 1994	Ernesto Pérez Balladares	President	Attended the Summit of the Americas in Miami
October 5, 1995	October 7, 1995	Ernesto Pérez Balladares	President	Official working visit.
October 18, 1999	October 20, 1999	Mireya Moscoso	President	Working visit.
June 24, 2003	June 27, 2003	Mireya Moscoso	President	Official working visit.
November 14, 2007	November 16, 2007	Martin Torrijos	President	Working visit.
May 5, 2008	May 8, 2008	Martin Torrijos	President	Working visit.
October 15, 2008	October 17, 2008	Martin Torrijos	President	Working visit.
April 28, 2011	April 28, 2011	Ricardo Martinelli	President	Working visit.
June 19, 2017	June 19, 2017	Juan Carlos Varela	President	Official Working Visit.

== Nicaragua ==
Table of Trips
Start	End	Guest	Title	Reason
May 5, 1939	May 11, 1939	Anastasio Somoza García	President	At the invitation of President Roosevelt. In U.S. May 1 – June 1. Addressed U.S. Congress May 8. Also visited New Orleans, New York City, Philadelphia and San Francisco.
May 1, 1952	May 6, 1952	Anastasio Somoza García	President	Unofficial visit to Washington, D.C. Afterwards visited Boston and New York City. Departed U.S. July 5.
April 6, 1967	April 6, 1967	Anastasio Somoza Debayle	President	Informal visit. Arrived in U.S. March 18; visited New York City.
October 24, 1970	October 24, 1970	Anastasio Somoza Debayle	President	Attended White House dinner on 25th Anniversary of the U.N
June 2, 1971	June 2, 1971	Anastasio Somoza Debayle	President	Private visit.
September 24, 1979	September 24, 1979	Daniel Ortega	Junta Chairman	Private visit to Washington en route to U.N. General Assembly session.
September 29, 1990	September 29, 1990	Violeta Chamorro	President	Met with President Bush at the U.N. General Assembly.
May 15, 1991	May 18, 1991	Violeta Chamorro	President	State Visit. Afterwards visited Miami.
May 9, 1992	May 10, 1992	Violeta Chamorro	President	Met with President Bush during a private visit.
November 30, 1993	November 30, 1993	Violeta Chamorro	President	Attended working brunch with President Clinton.
December 9, 1994	December 11, 1994	Violeta Chamorro	President	Attended the Summit of the Americas in Miami
December 9, 1998	December 11, 1998	Arnoldo Aleman	President	Attended conference on Central American reconstruction at the Inter-American Development Bank. Private visit with President Clinton December 11.
April 10, 2003	April 10, 2003	Enrique Bolaños	President	Working visit. Discussed negotiations for a Central American Free Trade Agreement.
May 10, 2005	May 12, 2005	Enrique Bolaños	President	Working visit. Discussed Central American and Dominican Republic Free Trade Agreement.

== Saint Kitts and Nevis ==
Table of Trips
Start	End	Guest	Title	Reason
July 17, 1984	July 19, 1984	Kennedy Simmonds	Prime Minister	Attended meeting of Caribbean Heads of Government in Charleston. Met with President Reagan July 19.
December 9, 1994	December 11, 1994	Kennedy Simmonds	Prime Minister	Attended the Summit of the Americas in Miami.

== Saint Lucia ==
Table of Trips
Start	End	Guest	Title	Reason
July 17, 1984	July 19, 1984	John Compton	Prime Minister	Attended meeting of Caribbean Heads of Government in Charleston. Met with President Reagan July 19.
December 9, 1994	December 11, 1994	John Compton	Prime Minister	Attended the Summit of the Americas in Miami
September 24, 2003	September 24, 2003	Kenny Anthony	Prime Minister	Met with President Bush at the UN General Assembly in New York City
March 22, 2019	March 22, 2019	Allen Chastanet	Prime Minister	Caribbean Leaders Conference at Mar-a-Lago, Florida.
June 8, 2022	June 10, 2022	Philip J. Pierre	Prime Minister	Attended the Summit of the Americas in Los Angeles, California.

== Saint Vincent and the Grenadines ==
Table of Trips
Start	End	Guest	Title	Reason
December 9, 1994	December 11, 1994	James Fitz-Allen Mitchell	Prime Minister	Attended the Summit of the Americas in Miami

== Trinidad and Tobago ==
Table of Trips
Start	End	Guest	Title	Reason
January 21, 1975	January 21, 1975	Eric Williams	Prime Minister	Private visit.
October 9, 1990	October 9, 1990	A. N. R. Robinson	Prime Minister	Met with President Bush during a private visit.
April 11, 1992	April 15, 1992	Patrick Manning	Prime Minister	Met with President Bush during a private visit.
April 30, 1993	April 30, 1993	Patrick Manning	Prime Minister	Attended a CARICOM working luncheon.
December 9, 1994	December 11, 1994	Patrick Manning	Prime Minister	Attended the Summit of the Americas in Miami

== See also ==
- Foreign policy of the United States
- Foreign relations of the United States
- List of international trips made by presidents of the United States
- List of diplomatic visits to the United States
- State visit
