= List of international trips made by presidents of the United States =

Map of countries by the number of visits made by a president of the United States, as of February 8, 2023: United States; 40+ visits; 30-39 visits; 20-29 visits; 15-19 visits; 10-14 visits; 5-9 visits; 1-4 visits; No known visits

International trips made by presidents of the United States have become a valuable part of the United States' interactions with foreign nations since such trips were first made in the early 20th century. Traveling abroad is one of the many duties of the president of the United States, leading the nation's diplomatic efforts through state visits, private meetings with foreign leaders, or attending international summits. These are complicated undertakings that require months of planning along with a great deal of coordination and communication.

In the 19th century, American social convention made international travel by the incumbent president taboo, though foreign travel by former presidents was acceptable. The most widely publicized trip of this nature was the 1877–79 world tour of Ulysses S. Grant. Domestic travel was regarded as a welcome opportunity for presidents to talk with the people who had elected them, but foreign travel was seen in an altogether different light. The general public did not want their president mingling with royalty, visiting grand palaces, or exchanging bows with kings and queens. This taboo was broken in the early 20th century, as policy makers at the federal level began to reevaluate the nation's role in international affairs.

The first international presidential trip, Theodore Roosevelt's 1906 visit to Panama, signaled a new era in how presidents conducted diplomatic relations with other countries. Roosevelt's four immediate successors made at least one international trip while in office, cementing the acceptability of presidential global travel.

New transportation technologies also played a role in the changing patterns of presidential travel as well. Early in the 20th century, trips were made by steamship. When Woodrow Wilson traveled to Europe aboard the George Washington in 1918–19, the voyage took nine days. Forty years later, Dwight D. Eisenhower made the same trip by jet in nine hours. Jet aircraft enabled U.S. presidents to travel the globe in ways that would have been impractical if not inconceivable before. While Eisenhower was the first president to travel by jet (and the first to travel via helicopter as well), the first airplane trips by a sitting president were those of Franklin D. Roosevelt. He made multiple long-distance trips abroad by plane, each one an offshoot of Allied diplomatic interactions during World War II. Lyndon B. Johnson, who flew 523,000 miles (842,000 km) aboard Air Force One while in office, made the first round-the-world presidential trip in December 1967.

The frequency and travel distance of presidential international travel has increased dramatically since George H. W. Bush became president in 1989. In 1990 the military version of the Boeing 747, the VC-25, was introduced for the use of the president. The planes have over 4,000 square feet (372 m^{2}) of floor space, a bedroom and a shower, and enough secure communications to allow the plane to be a reasonable place to run the country. The plane is accompanied by a heavy lift aircraft that carries the helicopters and the limousines. Presidents Bill Clinton (1993–2001) and George W. Bush (2001–2009) visited 72 and 73 countries respectively during their terms of office. All totaled, they went to 91 countries with a combined population of 85% of the world total. President Barack Obama (2009–2017) visited 58 countries. Presidential visits of over 10,000 miles (16,093 km) are common. A round the world trip was first done by Johnson and subsequently has been done by presidents Nixon and Bush. Trips to Europe and Asia are becoming almost routine in the 21st century. There has been at least 364 trips by U.S. presidents to Europe, 206 to Asia, 89 to Middle America, 61 to Africa, 50 to Northern America, 48 to South America, and 10 to Oceania.

== Early 20th century trips ==
With the completion of the Panama Canal in 1914, the American Panama Canal Zone became a major staging area for the U.S. military and the United States became the dominant military power in Central America. When Theodore Roosevelt traveled to Panama in November 1906 to inspect progress on the canal, he became the first U.S. president to leave the country while in office. Subsequently, both William Howard Taft (in 1909) and Warren G. Harding (in 1920) visited Panama while each was the president-elect.

Taft and Harding each made one international trip while president. Taft and Mexican president Porfirio Díaz exchanged visits across the Mexico–United States border, at El Paso, Texas, and Ciudad Juárez, Chihuahua, in October 1909. While filled with much symbolism, the meetings did pave the way for the start of construction on the Elephant Butte Dam project in 1911, even as Mexico fell into revolution. Harding made an official visit to Vancouver, British Columbia, on July 27, 1923 (six days prior to his death). Greeted dock-side by the premier of British Columbia and the mayor of Vancouver, he was given a parade through the city to Stanley Park, where he spoke to an audience estimated at over 40,000.

Woodrow Wilson made two international trips while in office. When he sailed for France in December 1918 for the Paris Peace Conference, he became the first sitting president to travel to Europe. He spent nearly seven months in Europe, interrupted by a brief nine-day return to the U.S. in late February 1919. Wilson was awarded the 1919 Nobel Peace Prize for his peacemaking efforts. While in Rome, he met with Pope Benedict XV; this was the first meeting between an incumbent American president and a reigning pope.

Calvin Coolidge traveled to Havana, Cuba, in January 1928, where he addressed the Sixth International Conference of American States. There, he extended an olive branch to Latin American leaders embittered over America's interventionist policies in Central America and the Caribbean. It was the only time in his life that he traveled outside the contiguous United States.

The most recent president not to make any international trips during his time in office was Herbert Hoover (1929–33). He did, however, undertake an extensive ten-week tour of Latin America during the time he was president-elect. He delivered 25 speeches in 10 countries, almost all of which stressed his plans to reduce American political and military interference in Latin American affairs. In sum, he pledged that the United States would act as a "good neighbor."

== Franklin D. Roosevelt ==
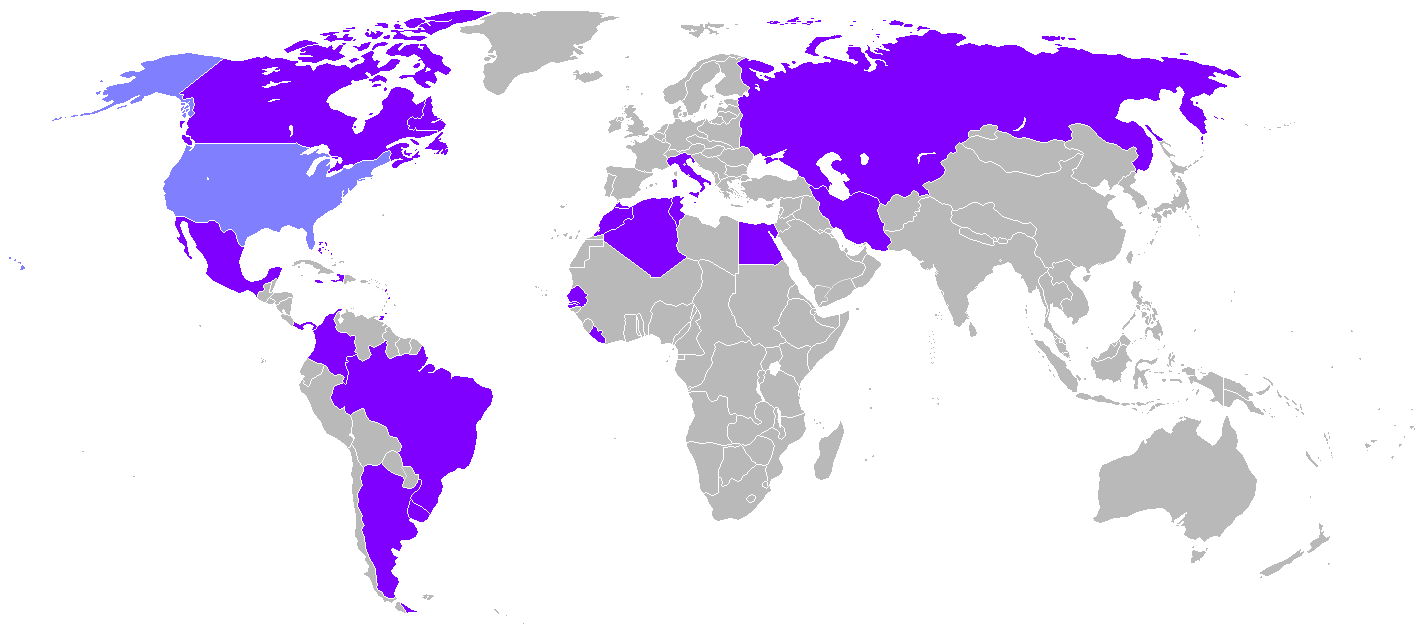
Countries visited by Franklin D. Roosevelt during his presidency, 1933–45

Franklin D. Roosevelt made 20 international trips during his presidency. His early travels were by ship, frequently for fishing vacations to the Bahama Banks, Canadian Maritimes, or Newfoundland Island. One such fishing expedition in August 1941 was a subterfuge to cover his first official meeting with Winston Churchill, the so-called Atlantic Conference. In 1943 he became the first incumbent president to fly by airplane across the Atlantic Ocean during his secret mission to Casablanca. As a result of this trip, he also became the first president to visit North Africa while in office.

== Harry S. Truman ==
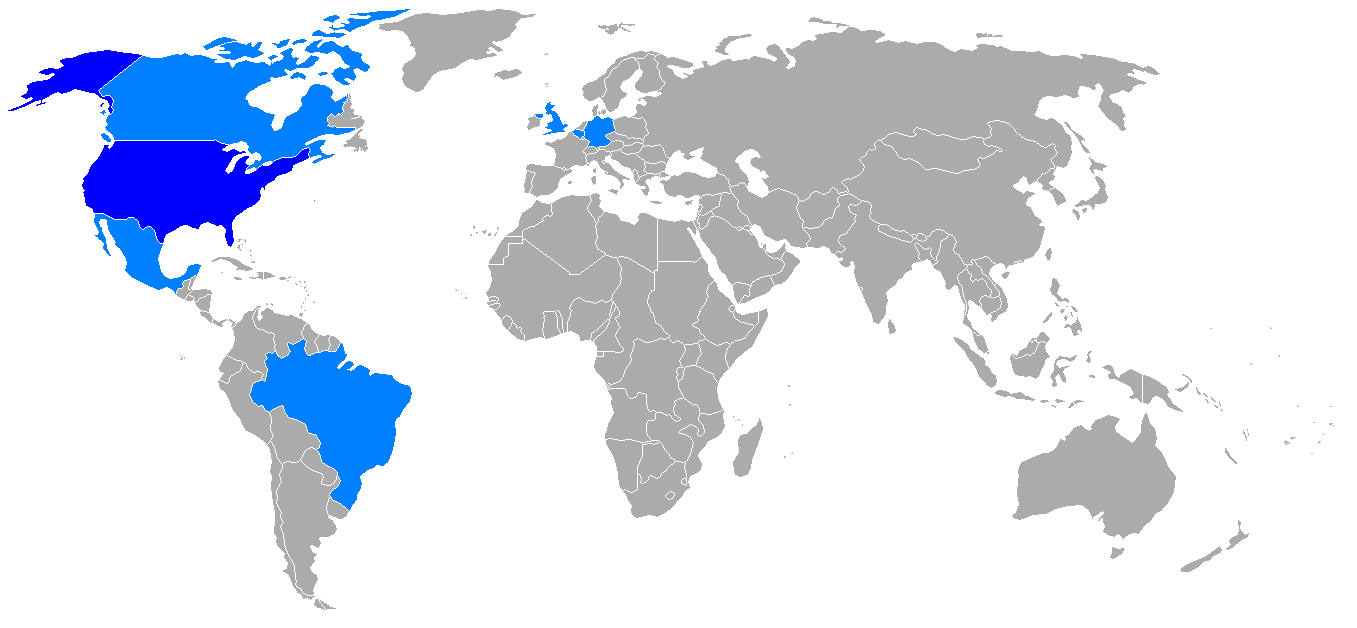
Countries visited by Harry S. Truman during his presidency, 1945–53

Harry S. Truman made five international trips during his presidency. Three months after ascending to the presidency, Truman made his only trans-Atlantic trip as president to participate in talks concerning how to administer the defeated Nazi Germany, which had agreed to unconditional surrender nine weeks earlier (V-E Day). He also visited neighboring Bermuda, Canada, and Mexico, plus Brazil in South America. Truman only left the continental United States on two other occasions (to Puerto Rico, the Virgin Islands, Guantanamo Bay Naval Base, Cuba, February 20–March 5, 1948; and to Wake Island, October 11–18, 1950) during his nearly eight years in office.

== Dwight D. Eisenhower ==
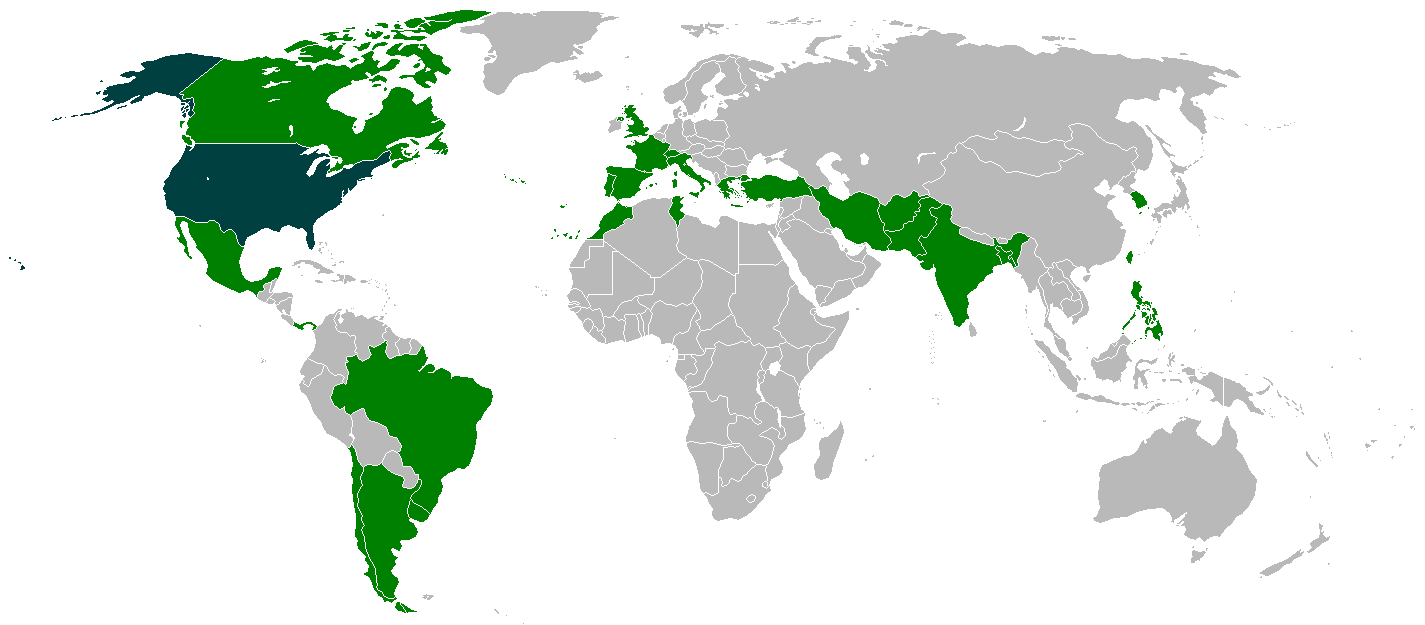
Countries visited by Dwight D. Eisenhower during his presidency, 1953–61

Dwight D. Eisenhower made 16 international trips during his presidency. He also traveled abroad once while president-elect, visiting South Korea in December 1952, fulfilling a campaign pledge to investigate what might get stalled Korean War peace talks moving forward. By the time he left office in January 1961, Eisenhower had visited 26 countries.

Columbine II, one of four propeller-driven aircraft introduced to presidential service during Eisenhower's first term in office, was the first plane to bear the call sign Air Force One. This designation for the U.S. Air Force aircraft carrying the incumbent president was established after an incident in 1953, when Eastern Air Lines 8610, a commercial flight, crossed paths with Air Force 8610, which was carrying Eisenhower. Initially used informally, the designation became official in 1962.

In 1959, the Air Force added the first of three specially built Boeing 707-120 jet aircraft—VC-137s, designated SAM (Special Air Missions) 970, 971, and 972—into the fleet. The high-speed jet technology built into these aircraft enabled presidents from Eisenhower through Nixon to travel long distances more quickly for face-to-face meetings with world leaders. That year he journeyed to Europe, Southeast Asia, South America, the Middle East, and South Asia. On his "Flight to Peace" goodwill tour in December 1959, the president visited 11 nations, flying 22,000 miles (35,000 km) in 19 days aboard the VC-137 SAM970.

== John F. Kennedy ==
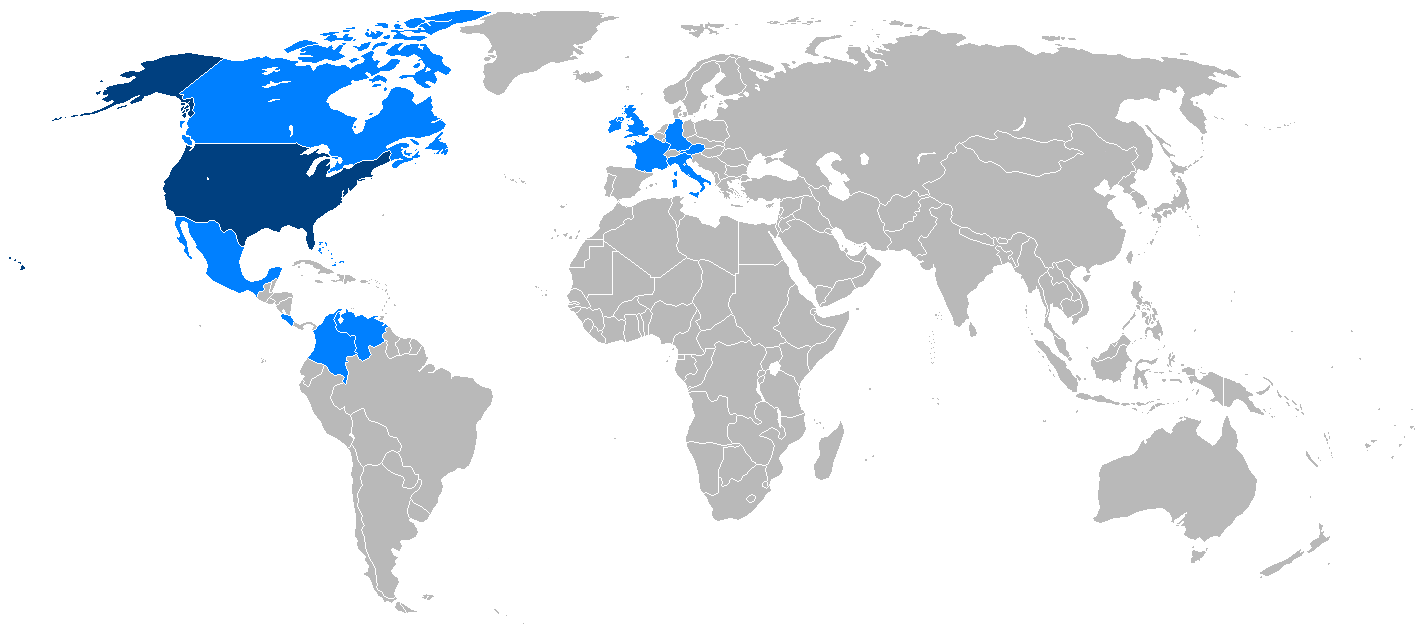
Countries visited by John F. Kennedy during his presidency, 1961–63

John F. Kennedy made eight international trips during his presidency. Two of these were to Europe, and the other six were to various nations in the Western Hemisphere. His second trip to Europe included the famous speech Ich bin ein Berliner at the Rathaus Schöneberg, the visit of the first Catholic president to Vatican City, plus the visit to Kennedy's ancestral home in Ireland. First Lady Jacqueline Kennedy traveled with him on his 1961 visit to France and received such a popular reaction there that the president quipped "I am the man who accompanied Jacqueline Kennedy to Paris – and I have enjoyed it!"

== Lyndon B. Johnson ==
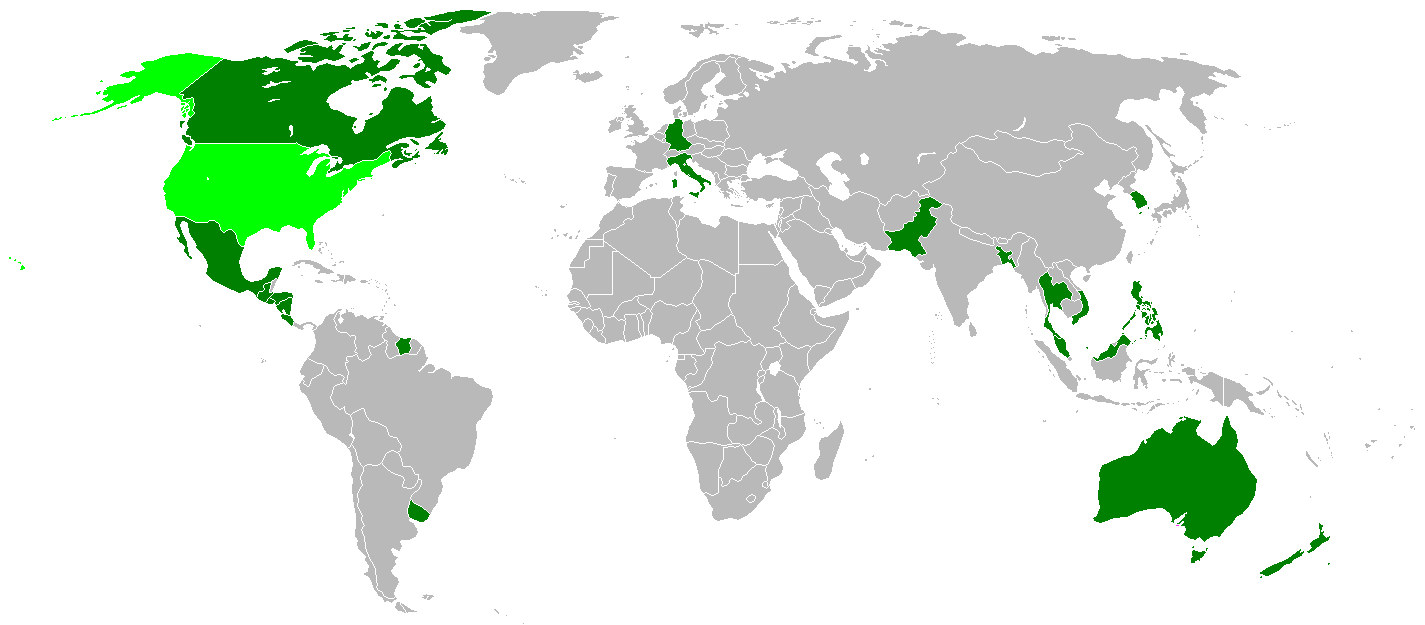
Countries visited by Lyndon B. Johnson during his presidency, 1963–69

Lyndon B. Johnson made 11 international trips during his presidency. He flew 523,000 miles (842,000 km) aboard Air Force One while in office. Eschewing Europe in favor of Southeast Asia and Latin America. One of the most unusual international trips in presidential history occurred before Christmas in 1967. The president began the trip by going to the memorial service for Australian prime minister Harold Holt, who had disappeared in a swimming accident and was presumed drowned. The White House did not reveal in advance to the press that the president would make the first round-the-world presidential trip. The trip was 26,959 miles (43,386 km) completed in 112.5 hours (4.7 days). The trip crossed the equator twice, stopped in Travis Air Force Base, California, then Honolulu, Pago Pago, Canberra, Melbourne, South Vietnam, Karachi, and Rome.

== Richard Nixon ==
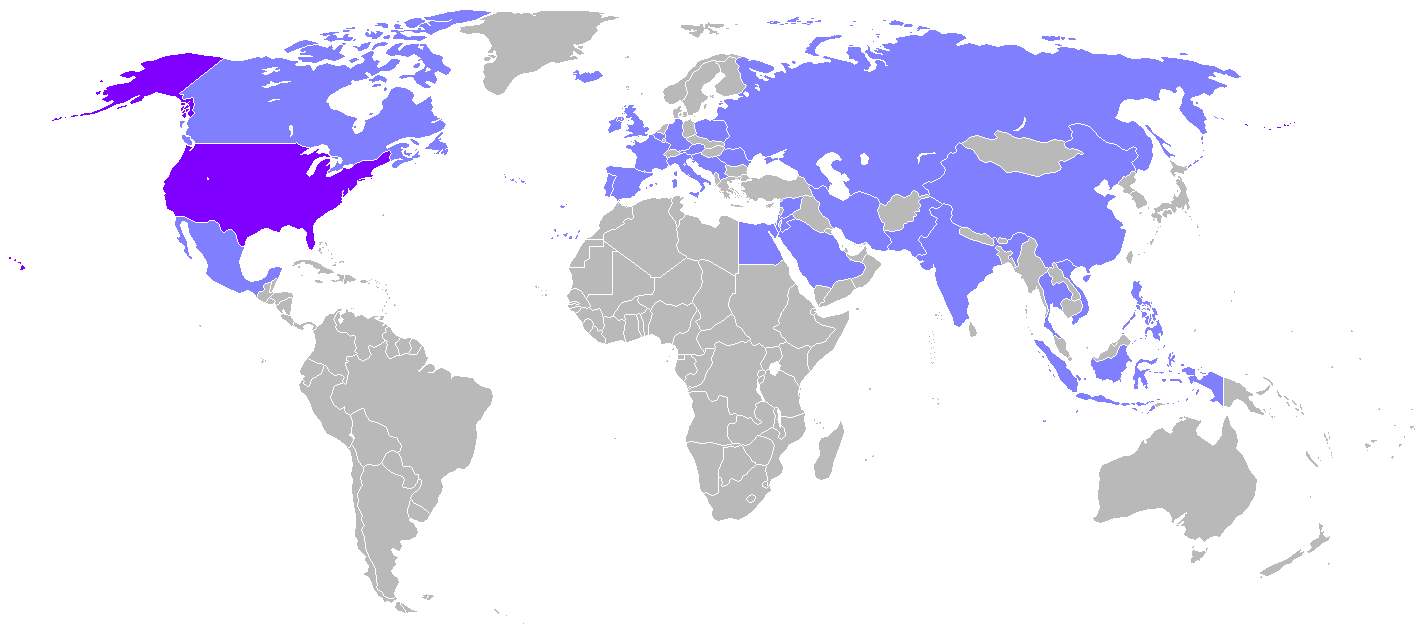
Countries visited by Richard Nixon during his presidency, 1969–74

Richard Nixon made 15 international trips during his presidency. He made the unusual move of going on a week-long trip to Europe only five weeks after his inauguration. Nixon's 1972 visit to China was an important strategic and diplomatic overture that marked the culmination of the Nixon administration's resumption of cordial relations between the U.S. and China. He also made groundbreaking trips to various communist-ruled nations as well, including: Romania (1969), Yugoslavia (1970), Poland (1972), and the Soviet Union (1972 and 1974). In 1972 Nixon received delivery of the second custom outfitted jet to be used as Air Force One, VC-137C SAM 27000.

== Gerald Ford ==
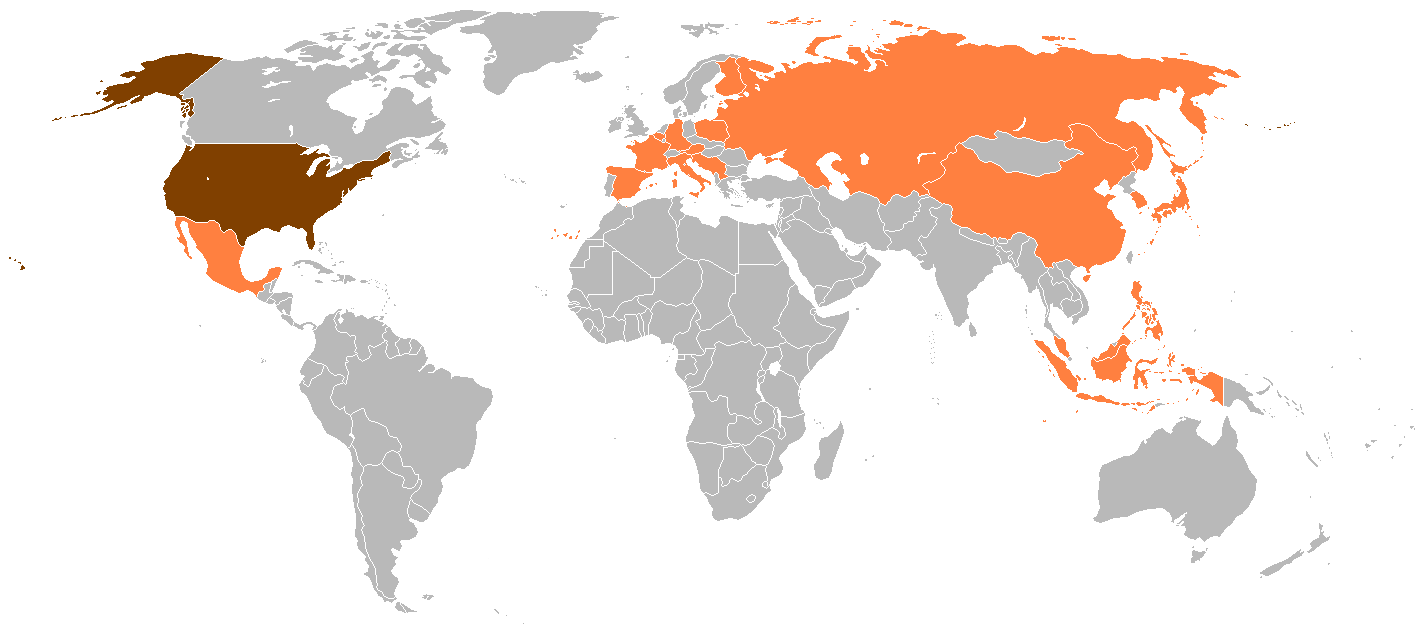
Countries visited by Gerald Ford during his presidency, 1974–77

Gerald Ford made seven international trips during his presidency. Ford made the first visit of a sitting president to Japan, and followed it with a trip to South Korea and the Soviet Union (to attend the Vladivostok Summit).

== Jimmy Carter ==
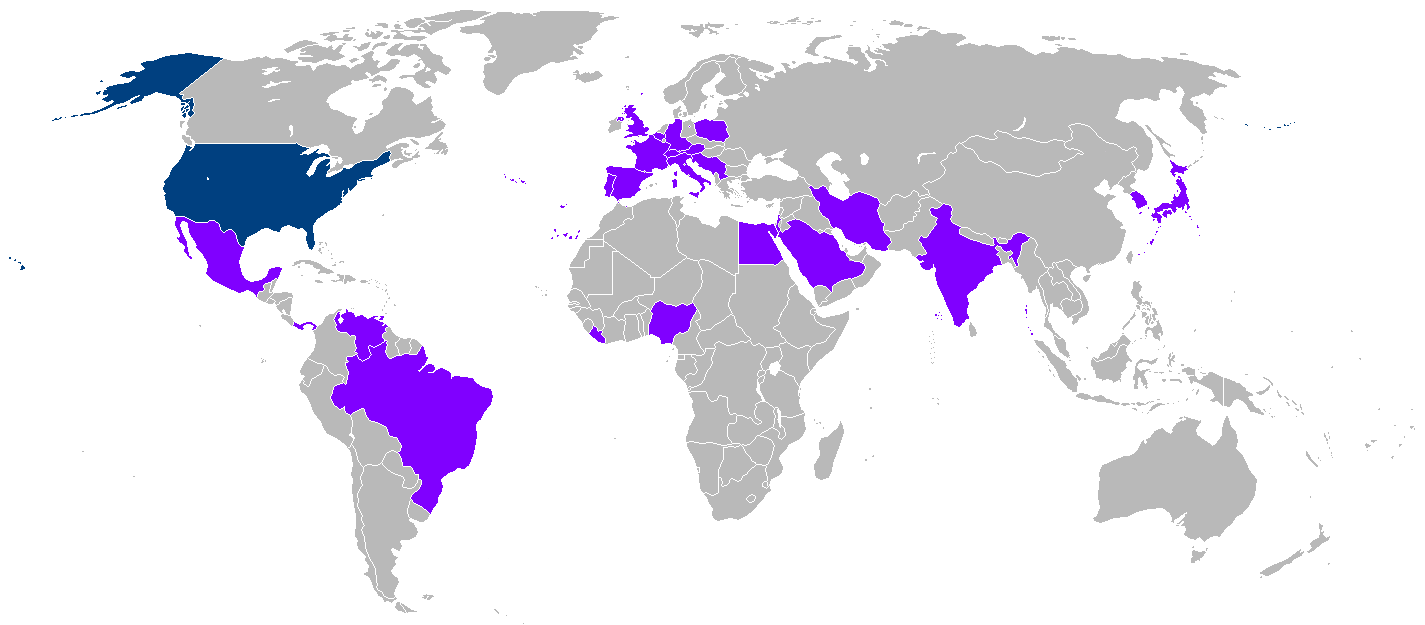
Countries visited by Jimmy Carter during his presidency, 1977–81

Jimmy Carter made 12 international trips to 25 countries during his presidency. Carter was the first president to make a state visit to Sub-Saharan Africa when he went to Nigeria in 1978. His travel included five trips to Europe and three trips to Asia. He also made several trips to the Middle East to broker peace negotiations. He was awarded the 2002 Nobel Peace Prize for his peacemaking efforts. In 1978, he travelled to Panama City to sign a protocol confirming exchange of documents ratifying the Panama Canal treaties.

== Ronald Reagan ==
Countries visited by Ronald Reagan during his presidency, 1981–89

Ronald Reagan made 24 international trips to 26 countries during his presidency. He made seven trips to continental Europe, three to Asia, and one to South America. He is perhaps best remembered for his speeches at the 40th anniversary of the Normandy landings, for his impassioned speech at the Berlin Wall, his summit meetings with Soviet leader Mikhail Gorbachev, and riding horses with Queen Elizabeth II at Windsor Great Park.

Reagan's presidency would be transitional in international travel. During his term in office, he ordered the two special mission Boeing VC-25 that would become the new presidential transport to replace the aging Boeing 707s. Heavy lift aircraft could bring security, limousines, and helicopters. After that time, the president had access to inflight bedrooms and showers, boardrooms, and communication equipment and with refueling virtually unlimited range. Summit meetings would proliferate, and international travel would become more of a constant expectation of the presidency.

== George H. W. Bush ==
Countries visited by George H. W. Bush during his presidency, 1989–93

George H. W. Bush made 26 international trips to 37 countries during his presidency. He initiated the frequent international travel pace that is the hallmark of the post–Cold War presidency. He went to Europe eleven times, Asia twice, and South America once, along with a number of shorter trips during his four years in office.

== Bill Clinton ==
Countries visited by Bill Clinton during his presidency, 1993–2001

Bill Clinton made 54 trips to 72 countries (in addition to visiting the West Bank and Gaza) during his presidency. He made 24 trips to continental Europe, seventeen to Asia, two to Africa, and to Australia. His others were to nations in the Americas. He took an active role in the Balkans, where he worked to promote peace and stability in and around the former Yugoslavia, and in the Middle East peace process, where he worked to promote peace between Israel and the Palestinians, as well as with the governments of neighboring nations.

== George W. Bush ==
Countries visited by George W. Bush during his presidency, 2001–2009

George W. Bush made 49 trips to 73 countries (in addition to visiting the West Bank) during his presidency, making him the most traveled president in office. During the course of his first year in office alone, he took seven trips to seventeen countries. He visited six continents: Africa, Asia, Australia, Europe, North America, and South America. On one of his two trips to Sub-Saharan Africa, he visited three of the poorest countries in the world at the time: Liberia, Rwanda, and Benin. He also made a secret trip to Iraq on Thanksgiving Day 2003 to dine with the troops. His father had made a similar visit to U.S. troops in Saudi Arabia in 1990. On November 15–20, 2006, Bush went to Russia, Singapore, Vietnam, and Indonesia.

== Barack Obama ==
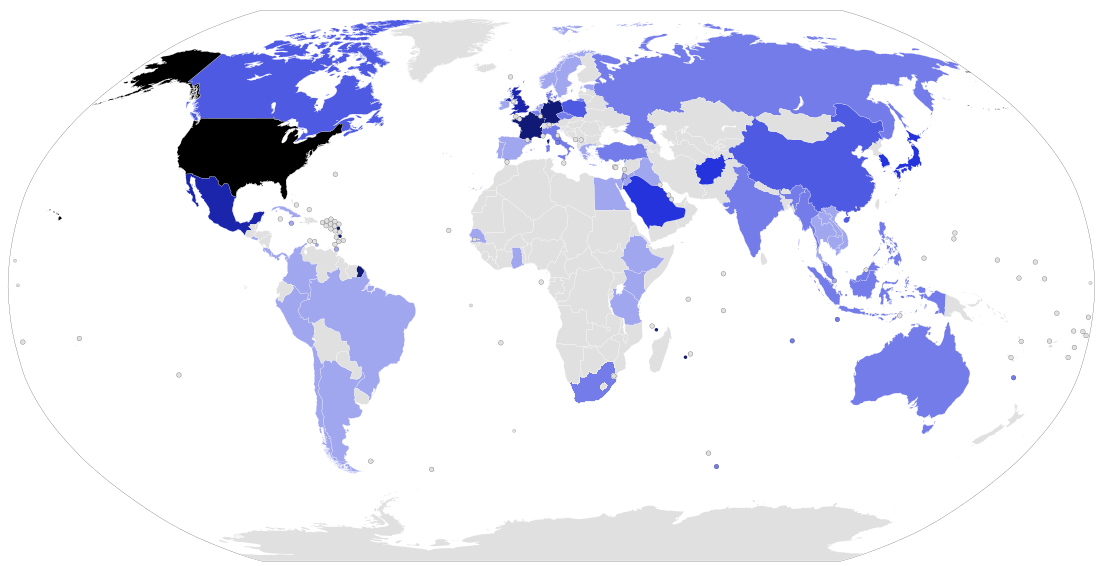
Countries visited by Barack Obama during his presidency, 2009–2017

Barack Obama made 52 trips to 58 countries (in addition to visiting the West Bank) during his presidency. He set the record as the most-traveled president for any first year in office: he took the most trips, visited the most countries, and spent the most days abroad. Obama made ten trips to 21 countries (four countries were visited twice) and was out of the U.S. a total of 37 days. The one geopolitical region that he never visited was Central Asia; this region has never been visited by a sitting U.S. president.

In December 2010, he made an unannounced trip to Afghanistan, where he visited with U.S. troops. The surprise trip came as the U.S. and NATO withdrew most of their forces from that country ahead of a year-end deadline. In November 2012 he visited Myanmar, where he bolstered the reforms undertaken by that nation's military-backed government. In March 2016, he made a historic trip to Cuba to underscore the thaw in Cuba–United States relations following a 54-year rift.

== Donald Trump ==
Countries visited by Donald Trump during his first presidency, 2017–2021

Countries visited by Donald Trump during his second presidency, since 2025

Donald Trump made 19 international trips to 24 countries (in addition to visiting the West Bank) during his first presidency. His 2018 Singapore Summit meeting with North Korean leader Kim Jong Un was the first-ever meeting between an incumbent U.S. president and a leader of North Korea. One year later, in June 2019, Trump also became the first U.S. president to cross over the Korean Demilitarized Zone and enter North Korea while in office. In December 2018, he made an unannounced Christmas trip to Iraq, where he visited with U.S. troops. Nearly a year later, in November 2019, he made an unannounced Thanksgiving trip to Afghanistan, where he visited with U.S. troops.

Trump has made 14 international trips to 19 countries during his second presidency. His first international trip in his second presidency was to Italy and Vatican City to attend the funeral of Pope Francis in April 2025. His first major international trip and second trip overall was to Saudi Arabia, Qatar, and the United Arab Emirates to secure business deals and investments in the United States.

== Joe Biden ==
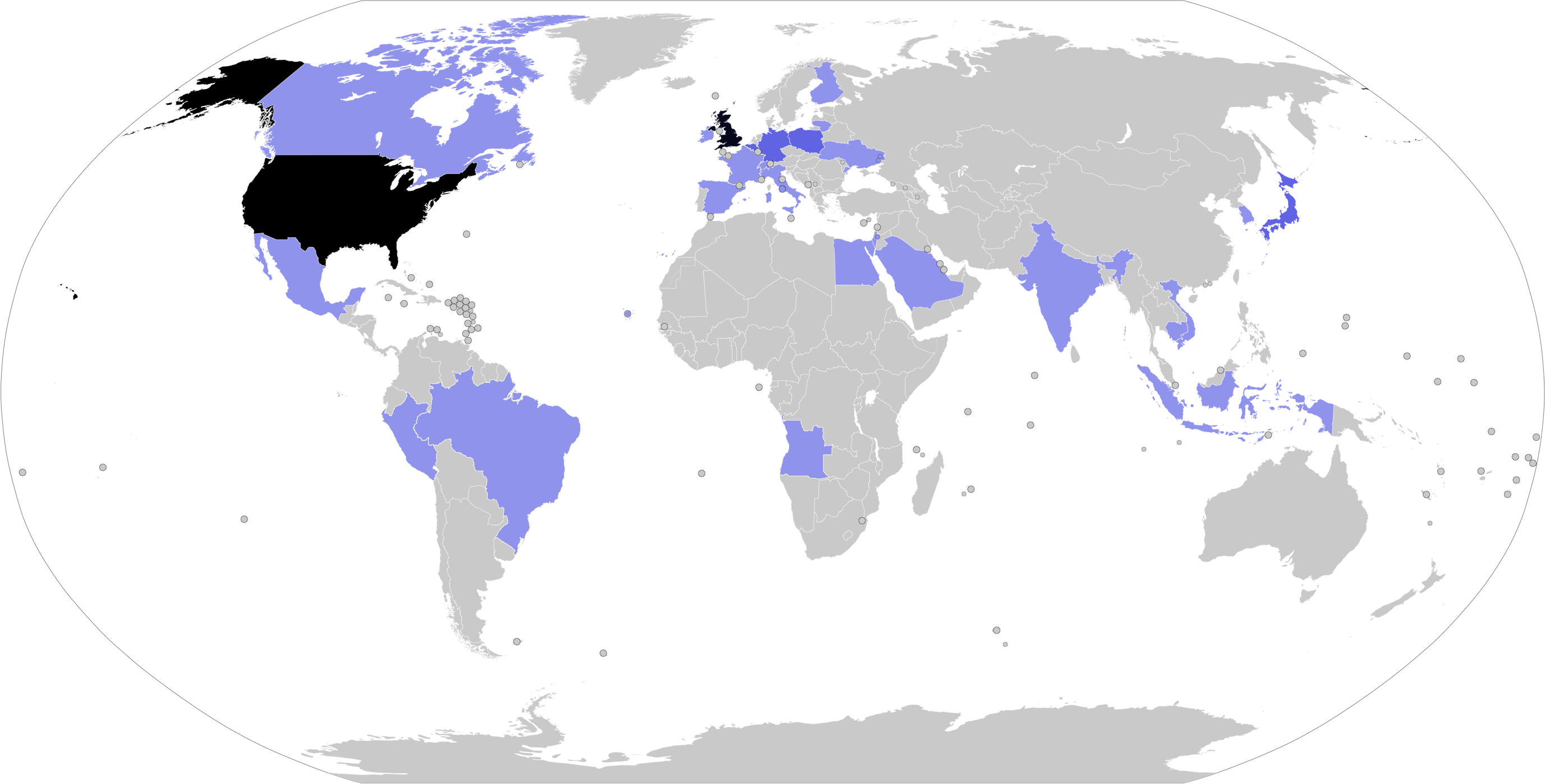
Countries visited by Joe Biden during his presidency, 2021–2025

Joe Biden made 21 international trips to 28 countries (in addition to visiting the West Bank) during his presidency. He made six trips abroad in 2022, including a September visit to the United Kingdom for the state funeral of Queen Elizabeth II. On February 20, 2023, he made an unannounced trip to Ukraine, where he met with President Volodymyr Zelenskyy ahead of the first anniversary of the Russian invasion of Ukraine. In December 2024, Biden became the first incumbent president to visit Cape Verde and Angola.

== Table of destinations ==
Twenty sitting U.S. presidents have traveled to at least one foreign country or dependent territory.

Region	Country or territory	NV	President and year of visit (Note: column sorts by year of first visit, not by president's name.)
Central Africa	Angola	1	Joe Biden 2024
East Africa	Ethiopia	1	Barack Obama 2015
East Africa	Kenya	1	Barack Obama 2015
East Africa	Rwanda	2	Bill Clinton 1998 • George W. Bush 2008
East Africa	Somalia	1	George H. W. Bush 1993
East Africa	Tanzania	3	Bill Clinton 2000 • George W. Bush 2008 • Barack Obama 2013
East Africa	Uganda	2	Bill Clinton 1998 • George W. Bush 2003
North Africa	Egypt	18	Franklin D. Roosevelt 1943 (2), 1945 • Richard Nixon 1974 • Jimmy Carter 1978, 1979 (2) • George H. W. Bush 1990 • Bill Clinton 1994, 1996, 2000 (2) • George W. Bush 2003, 2008 (2) • Barack Obama 2009 • Joe Biden 2022 • Donald Trump 2025
North Africa	French Algeria (Note: Algeria was ruled as an integral part of France at the time of Franklin D. Roosevelt's visits in 1943 and 1945. It became an independent sovereign state on July 5, 1962 following the Algerian War, the 1962 French Évian Accords referendum, and the 1962 Algerian independence referendum.)	2	Franklin D. Roosevelt 1943, 1945
North Africa	Morocco (Note: Morocco was a French protectorate at the time of Franklin D. Roosevelt's visit in 1943. It became an independent sovereign state on April 7, 1956.)	3	Franklin D. Roosevelt 1943 • Dwight Eisenhower 1959 • Bill Clinton 1999
North Africa	Tunisia (Note: Tunisia was a French protectorate at the time of Franklin D. Roosevelt's visits in 1943. It became an independent sovereign state on March 20, 1956.)	3	Franklin D. Roosevelt 1943 (2) • Dwight Eisenhower 1959
Southern Africa	Botswana	2	Bill Clinton 1998 • George W. Bush 2003
Southern Africa	South Africa	4	Bill Clinton 1998 • George W. Bush 2003 • Barack Obama 2013 (2)
West Africa	Benin	1	George W. Bush 2008
West Africa	Cape Verde	1	Joe Biden 2024
West Africa	French West Africa (Note: French West Africa was a federation of eight French colonial territories in West Africa. It ceased to exist after the 1958 French constitutional referendum.)	1	Franklin D. Roosevelt 1943
West Africa	Gambia (Note: The Gambia was a colony and protectorate of the United Kingdom at the time of Franklin D. Roosevelt's visits in 1943. It became an independent sovereign state on February 18, 1965 after passage of the Gambia Independence Act 1964.)	2	Franklin D. Roosevelt 1943 (2)
West Africa	Ghana	3	Bill Clinton 1998 • George W. Bush 2008 • Barack Obama 2009
West Africa	Liberia	3	Franklin D. Roosevelt 1943 • Jimmy Carter 1978 • George W. Bush 2008
West Africa	Nigeria	3	Jimmy Carter 1978 • Bill Clinton 2000 • George W. Bush 2003
West Africa	Senegal (Note: Senegal became independent in 1960. A 1943 visit by Franklin D. Roosevelt to this then-French colony is listed under French West Africa.)	4	Bill Clinton 1998 • George W. Bush 2003 • Barack Obama 2013 (2)
Middle America	The Bahamas (Note: The Bahamas was a colony of the United Kingdom at the time of Franklin D. Roosevelt and John F. Kennedy's visits. It became an independent sovereign state on July 10, 1973.)	5	Franklin D. Roosevelt 1934, 1935, 1936, 1940 • John F. Kennedy 1962
Middle America	Barbados	2	Ronald Reagan 1982 • Bill Clinton 1997
Middle America	British Leeward Islands (Note: The British Leeward Islands was a colony of the United Kingdom which was dissolved in 1958.)	1	Franklin D. Roosevelt 1940
Middle America	Costa Rica	6	John F. Kennedy 1963 • Lyndon Johnson 1968 • Ronald Reagan 1982 • George H. W. Bush 1989 • Bill Clinton 1997 • Barack Obama 2013
Middle America	Cuba	2	Calvin Coolidge 1928 • Barack Obama 2016
Middle America	El Salvador	4	Lyndon Johnson 1968 • Bill Clinton 1999 • George W. Bush 2002 • Barack Obama 2011
Middle America	Grenada	1	Ronald Reagan 1986
Middle America	Guadeloupe	1	Jimmy Carter 1979
Middle America	Guatemala	3	Lyndon Johnson 1968 • Bill Clinton 1999 • George W. Bush 2007
Middle America	Haiti	2	Franklin D. Roosevelt 1934 • Bill Clinton 1995
Middle America	Honduras	3	Lyndon Johnson 1968 • Ronald Reagan 1982 • Bill Clinton 1999
Middle America	Jamaica (Note: Jamaica was a colony of the United Kingdom at the time of Franklin D. Roosevelt's visit in 1940. It became an independent sovereign state on August 6, 1962.)	3	Franklin D. Roosevelt 1940 • Ronald Reagan 1982 • Barack Obama 2015
Middle America	Martinique	3	Franklin D. Roosevelt 1940 • Gerald Ford 1974 • George H. W. Bush 1991
Middle America	Mexico	34	William Howard Taft 1909 • Franklin D. Roosevelt 1943 • Harry Truman 1947 • Dwight Eisenhower 1953, 1959, 1960 • John F. Kennedy 1962 • Lyndon Johnson 1966 (2), 1967 • Richard Nixon 1969, 1970 • Gerald Ford 1974 • Jimmy Carter 1979 • Ronald Reagan 1981, 1982, 1983, 1986, 1988 • George H. W. Bush 1990 • Bill Clinton 1997, 1999 • George W. Bush 2001, 2002 (2), 2004, 2006, 2007 • Barack Obama 2009 (2), 2012, 2013, 2014 • Joe Biden 2023
Middle America	Nicaragua	2	Lyndon Johnson 1968 • Bill Clinton 1999
Middle America	Panama	10	Theodore Roosevelt 1906 • Franklin D. Roosevelt 1934, 1935, 1938, 1940 • Dwight Eisenhower 1956 • Jimmy Carter 1978 • George H. W. Bush 1992 • George W. Bush 2005 • Barack Obama 2015
Middle America	Saint Lucia (Note: Saint Lucia was a colony of the United Kingdom at the time of Franklin D. Roosevelt's visit in 1940. It became an independent sovereign state on February 22, 1979.)	1	Franklin D. Roosevelt 1940
Middle America	Saint Martin	1	George H. W. Bush 1989
Middle America	Trinidad and Tobago (Note: Trinidad and Tobago was a colony of the United Kingdom at the time of Franklin D. Roosevelt's visits in 1936 and 1943. It became an independent sovereign state on August 31, 1962 after passage of the Trinidad and Tobago Independence Act 1962.)	5	Franklin D. Roosevelt 1936 (2), 1943 (2) • Barack Obama 2009
Northern America	Bermuda	7	Harry Truman 1946 • Dwight Eisenhower 1953, 1957 • John F. Kennedy 1961 • Richard Nixon 1971 • George H. W. Bush 1990, 1991
Northern America	Canada	42	Warren Harding 1923 • Franklin D. Roosevelt 1933, 1936 (2), 1938, 1939 (2), 1943, 1944 • Harry Truman 1947 • Dwight Eisenhower 1953, 1958, 1959 • John F. Kennedy 1961 • Lyndon Johnson 1964, 1966, 1967 • Richard Nixon 1972 • Ronald Reagan 1981 (2), 1985, 1987, 1988 • George H. W. Bush 1989, 1990, 1991 (2) • Bill Clinton 1993, 1995 (2), 1997, 1999 • George W. Bush 2001, 2002, 2004, 2007 • Barack Obama 2009, 2010, 2016 • Donald Trump 2018 • Joe Biden 2023 • Donald Trump 2025
Northern America	Newfoundland (Note: Newfoundland was a dominion of the United Kingdom at the time of Franklin D. Roosevelt's visits in 1939 and 1940. It became a province of the Canadian Confederation on March 31, 1949, following the 1948 Newfoundland referendums. Its name was officially changed to Newfoundland and Labrador in 2001.)	2	Franklin D. Roosevelt 1939, 1940
South America	Argentina	7	Franklin D. Roosevelt 1936 • Dwight Eisenhower 1960 • George H. W. Bush 1990 • Bill Clinton 1997 • George W. Bush 2005 • Barack Obama 2016 • Donald Trump 2018
South America	Brazil	14	Franklin D. Roosevelt 1936, 1943 (2) • Harry Truman 1947 • Dwight Eisenhower 1960 • Jimmy Carter 1978 • Ronald Reagan 1982 • George H. W. Bush 1990, 1992 • Bill Clinton 1997 • George W. Bush 2005, 2007 • Barack Obama 2011 • Joe Biden 2024
South America	Chile	5	Dwight Eisenhower 1960 • George H. W. Bush 1990 • Bill Clinton 1998 • George W. Bush 2004 • Barack Obama 2011
South America	Colombia	8	Franklin D. Roosevelt 1934 • John F. Kennedy 1961 • Ronald Reagan 1982 • George H. W. Bush 1990 • Bill Clinton 1998 • George W. Bush 2004, 2007 • Barack Obama 2012
South America	Peru	4	George W. Bush 2002, 2008 • Barack Obama 2016 • Joe Biden 2024
South America	Suriname (Note: Suriname was a constituent country of the Kingdom of the Netherlands at the time of Lyndon B. Johnson's visit in 1967. It became an independent sovereign state on November 25, 1975.)	1	Lyndon Johnson 1967
South America	Uruguay	5	Franklin D. Roosevelt 1936 • Dwight Eisenhower 1960 • Lyndon Johnson 1967 • George H. W. Bush 1990 • George W. Bush 2007
South America	Venezuela	4	John F. Kennedy 1961 • Jimmy Carter 1978 • George H. W. Bush 1990 • Bill Clinton 1997
East Asia	China	15	Richard Nixon 1972 • Gerald Ford 1975 • Ronald Reagan 1984 • George H. W. Bush 1989 • Bill Clinton 1998 • George W. Bush 2001, 2002, 2005, 2008 • Barack Obama 2009, 2014, 2016 • Donald Trump 2017, 2026 (2)
East Asia	Japan	26	Gerald Ford 1974 • Jimmy Carter 1979, 1980 • Ronald Reagan 1983, 1986 • George H. W. Bush 1989, 1992 • Bill Clinton 1993, 1996, 1998, 2000 (2) • George W. Bush 2002, 2003, 2005, 2008 • Barack Obama 2009, 2010, 2014, 2016 • Donald Trump 2017, 2019 (2) • Joe Biden 2022, 2023 • Donald Trump 2025
East Asia	Mongolia	1	George W. Bush 2005
East Asia	North Korea	1	Donald Trump 2019
East Asia	South Korea	21	Dwight Eisenhower 1960 • Lyndon Johnson 1966 • Gerald Ford 1974 • Jimmy Carter 1979 • Ronald Reagan 1983 • George H. W. Bush 1989, 1992 • Bill Clinton 1993, 1996, 1998 • George W. Bush 2002, 2005, 2008 • Barack Obama 2009, 2010, 2012, 2014 • Donald Trump 2017, 2019 • Joe Biden 2022 • Donald Trump 2025
East Asia	Taiwan	1	Dwight Eisenhower 1960
South Asia	Afghanistan	8	Dwight Eisenhower 1959 • George W. Bush 2006, 2008 • Barack Obama 2010 (2), 2012, 2014 • Donald Trump 2019
South Asia	Bangladesh	1	Bill Clinton 2000
South Asia	India	9	Dwight Eisenhower 1959 • Richard Nixon 1969 • Jimmy Carter 1978 • Bill Clinton 2000 • George W. Bush 2006 • Barack Obama 2010, 2015 • Donald Trump 2020 • Joe Biden 2023
South Asia	Pakistan	5	Dwight Eisenhower 1959 • Lyndon Johnson 1967 • Richard Nixon 1969 • Bill Clinton 2000 • George W. Bush 2006
Southeast Asia	Brunei	1	Bill Clinton 2000
Southeast Asia	Cambodia	2	Barack Obama 2012 • Joe Biden 2022
Southeast Asia	Indonesia	9	Richard Nixon 1969 • Gerald Ford 1975 • Ronald Reagan 1986 • Bill Clinton 1994 • George W. Bush 2003, 2006 • Barack Obama 2010, 2011 • Joe Biden 2022
Southeast Asia	Laos	1	Barack Obama 2016
Southeast Asia	Malaysia	4	Lyndon Johnson 1966 • Barack Obama 2014, 2015 • Donald Trump 2025
Southeast Asia	Myanmar	2	Barack Obama 2012, 2014
Southeast Asia	Philippines	11	Dwight Eisenhower 1960 • Lyndon Johnson 1966 • Richard Nixon 1969 • Gerald Ford 1975 • Bill Clinton 1994, 1996 • George W. Bush 2003 • Barack Obama 2014, 2015 • Donald Trump 2017, 2026
Southeast Asia	Singapore	5	George H. W. Bush 1992 • George W. Bush 2003, 2006 • Barack Obama 2009 • Donald Trump 2018
Southeast Asia	South Vietnam (Note: South Vietnam merged with North Vietnam on July 2, 1976 to form a single country.)	3	Lyndon Johnson 1966, 1967 • Richard Nixon 1969
Southeast Asia	Thailand	7	Lyndon Johnson 1966, 1967 • Richard Nixon 1969 • Bill Clinton 1996 • George W. Bush 2003, 2008 • Barack Obama 2012
Southeast Asia	Vietnam	6	Bill Clinton 2000 • George W. Bush 2006 • Barack Obama 2016 • Donald Trump 2017, 2019 • Joe Biden 2023
West Asia	Bahrain	1	George W. Bush 2008
West Asia	Georgia	1	George W. Bush 2005
West Asia	Iran	4	Franklin D. Roosevelt 1943 • Dwight Eisenhower 1959 • Richard Nixon 1972 • Jimmy Carter 1978
West Asia	Iraq	6	George W. Bush 2003, 2006, 2007, 2008 • Barack Obama 2009 • Donald Trump 2018
West Asia	Israel	14	Richard Nixon 1974 • Jimmy Carter 1979 • Bill Clinton 1994, 1995, 1996, 1998 • George W. Bush 2008 (2) • Barack Obama 2013, 2016 • Donald Trump 2017 • Joe Biden 2022, 2023 • Donald Trump 2025
West Asia	Jordan	6	Richard Nixon 1974 • Bill Clinton 1994, 1999 • George W. Bush 2003, 2006 • Barack Obama 2013
West Asia	Kuwait	2	Bill Clinton 1994 • George W. Bush 2008
West Asia	Oman	1	Bill Clinton 2000
West Asia	Palestinian Authority	5	Bill Clinton 1998 • George W. Bush 2008 • Barack Obama 2013 • Donald Trump 2017 • Joe Biden 2022
West Asia	Qatar	3	George W. Bush 2003 • Donald Trump 2025 (2)
West Asia	Saudi Arabia	14	Richard Nixon 1974 • Jimmy Carter 1978 • George H. W. Bush 1990, 1992 • Bill Clinton 1994 • George W. Bush 2008 (2) • Barack Obama 2009, 2014, 2015, 2016 • Donald Trump 2017 • Joe Biden 2022 • Donald Trump 2025
West Asia	Syria	2	Richard Nixon 1974 • Bill Clinton 1994
West Asia	Turkey	7	Dwight Eisenhower 1959 • George H. W. Bush 1991 • Bill Clinton 1999 • George W. Bush 2004 • Barack Obama 2009, 2015 • Donald Trump 2026
West Asia	United Arab Emirates	2	George W. Bush 2008 • Donald Trump 2025
Eastern Europe & North Asia	Belarus (Note: U.S. presidential visits made prior to December 26, 1991 to this former Soviet republic are listed under the Soviet Union.)	1	Bill Clinton 1994
Eastern Europe & North Asia	Bulgaria	2	Bill Clinton 1999 • George W. Bush 2007
Eastern Europe & North Asia	Czechia	5	Bill Clinton 1994 • George W. Bush 2002, 2007 • Barack Obama 2009, 2010
Eastern Europe & North Asia	Czechoslovakia (Note: Czechoslovakia was split into the independent countries of the Czech Republic and Slovakia on January 1, 1993.)	1	George H. W. Bush 1990
Eastern Europe & North Asia	Hungary	4	George H. W. Bush 1989 • Bill Clinton 1994, 1996 • George W. Bush 2006
Eastern Europe & North Asia	Poland	16	Richard Nixon 1972 • Gerald Ford 1975 • Jimmy Carter 1977 • George H. W. Bush 1989, 1992 • Bill Clinton 1994, 1997 • George W. Bush 2001, 2003, 2007 • Barack Obama 2011, 2014, 2016 • Donald Trump 2017 • Joe Biden 2022, 2023
Eastern Europe & North Asia	Romania	5	Richard Nixon 1969 • Gerald Ford 1975 • Bill Clinton 1997 • George W. Bush 2002, 2008
Eastern Europe & North Asia	Russia	15	George H. W. Bush 1993 • Bill Clinton 1994, 1995, 1996, 1998, 2000 • George W. Bush 2002 (2), 2003, 2005, 2006 (2), 2008 • Barack Obama 2009, 2013
Eastern Europe & North Asia	Slovakia	1	George W. Bush 2005
Eastern Europe & North Asia	Soviet Union (Note: The Soviet Union was split into 15 independent countries in 1991.)	6	Franklin D. Roosevelt 1945 • Richard Nixon 1972, 1974 • Gerald Ford 1974 • Ronald Reagan 1988 • George H. W. Bush 1991
Eastern Europe & North Asia	Ukraine	5	Bill Clinton 1994, 1995, 2000 • George W. Bush 2008 • Joe Biden 2023
Northern Europe	Denmark	4	Bill Clinton 1997 • George W. Bush 2005 • Barack Obama 2009 (2)
Northern Europe	Estonia	2	George W. Bush 2006 • Barack Obama 2014
Northern Europe	Finland	7	Gerald Ford 1975 • Ronald Reagan 1988 • George H. W. Bush 1990, 1992 • Bill Clinton 1997 • Donald Trump 2018 • Joe Biden 2023
Northern Europe	Iceland	2	Richard Nixon 1973 • Ronald Reagan 1986
Northern Europe	Latvia	3	Bill Clinton 1994 • George W. Bush 2005, 2006
Northern Europe	Lithuania	2	George W. Bush 2002 • Joe Biden 2023
Northern Europe	Norway	2	Bill Clinton 1999 • Barack Obama 2009
Northern Europe	Sweden	2	George W. Bush 2001 • Barack Obama 2013
Southern Europe	Albania	1	George W. Bush 2007
Southern Europe	Bosnia and Herzegovina	3	Bill Clinton 1996, 1997, 1999
Southern Europe	Croatia (Note: Croatia became independent in 1991. A 1970 visit by Richard Nixon to this then-Yugoslav republic is listed under Yugoslavia.)	2	Bill Clinton 1996 • George W. Bush 2008
Southern Europe	Greece	4	Dwight Eisenhower 1959 • George H. W. Bush 1991 • Bill Clinton 1999 • Barack Obama 2016
Southern Europe	Italy	34	Woodrow Wilson 1919 • Franklin D. Roosevelt 1943 • Dwight Eisenhower 1959 • John F. Kennedy 1963 • Lyndon Johnson 1967 • Richard Nixon 1969, 1970 • Gerald Ford 1975 • Jimmy Carter 1980 • Ronald Reagan 1982, 1987 • George H. W. Bush 1989, 1991 • Bill Clinton 1994 (2), 1996, 1997, 1999 (3), 2000 • George W. Bush 2001, 2002, 2004, 2005, 2007, 2008 • Barack Obama 2009, 2014 • Donald Trump 2017 (2) • Joe Biden 2021, 2024 • Donald Trump 2025
Southern Europe	Kosovo (Note: Kosovo was administered by the United Nations at the time of Bill Clinton and George W. Bush’s visits. It declared independence on February 17, 2008.)	2	Bill Clinton 1999 • George W. Bush 2001
Southern Europe	Macedonia (Note: Name was changed from Macedonia to North Macedonia on February 12, 2019.)	1	Bill Clinton 1999
Southern Europe	Malta (Note: Malta was a colony of the United Kingdom at the time of Franklin D. Roosevelt's visits in 1943 and 1945. It became an independent sovereign state on September 21, 1964.)	3	Franklin D. Roosevelt 1943, 1945 • George H. W. Bush 1989
Southern Europe	Portugal	9	Dwight Eisenhower 1960 • Richard Nixon 1971, 1974 • Jimmy Carter 1980 • Ronald Reagan 1985 • Bill Clinton 2000 • George W. Bush 2003 • Barack Obama 2010, 2016
Southern Europe	Slovenia	3	Bill Clinton 1999 • George W. Bush 2001, 2008
Southern Europe	Spain	11	Dwight Eisenhower 1959 • Richard Nixon 1970 • Gerald Ford 1975 • Jimmy Carter 1980 • Ronald Reagan 1985 • George H. W. Bush 1991 • Bill Clinton 1995, 1997 • George W. Bush 2001 • Barack Obama 2016 • Joe Biden 2022
Southern Europe	Vatican City (Note: Vatican City was part of Italy at the time of Woodrow Wilson’s visit in 1919. It became an independent sovereign state when the Holy See and Italy signed the Lateran Treaty on February 11, 1929.)	23	Woodrow Wilson 1919 • Dwight Eisenhower 1959 • John F. Kennedy 1963 • Lyndon Johnson 1967 • Richard Nixon 1969, 1970 • Gerald Ford 1975 • Jimmy Carter 1980 • Ronald Reagan 1982, 1987 • George H. W. Bush 1989, 1991 • Bill Clinton 1994 • George W. Bush 2002, 2004, 2005, 2007, 2008 • Barack Obama 2009, 2014 • Donald Trump 2017 • Joe Biden 2021 • Donald Trump 2025
Southern Europe	Yugoslavia (Note: Yugoslavia was broken up in 1991–1992.)	3	Richard Nixon 1970 • Gerald Ford 1975 • Jimmy Carter 1980
Western Europe	Austria	6	John F. Kennedy 1961 • Richard Nixon 1972, 1974 • Gerald Ford 1975 • Jimmy Carter 1979 • George W. Bush 2006
Western Europe	Belgium	20	Woodrow Wilson 1919 • Harry Truman 1945 • Richard Nixon 1969, 1974 • Gerald Ford 1975 • Jimmy Carter 1978 • Ronald Reagan 1985, 1988 • George H. W. Bush 1989 (2) • Bill Clinton 1994, 1999 • George W. Bush 2001, 2005 • Barack Obama 2014 (2) • Donald Trump 2017, 2018 • Joe Biden 2021, 2022
Western Europe	France	42	Woodrow Wilson 1918 (2), 1919 (2) • Dwight Eisenhower 1957, 1959 (2), 1960 • John F. Kennedy 1961 • Richard Nixon 1969, 1970, 1974 • Gerald Ford 1975 • Jimmy Carter 1978 • Ronald Reagan 1982, 1984, 1985 • George H. W. Bush 1989, 1990, 1991, 1993 • Bill Clinton 1994, 1995, 1996, 1997, 1999 • George W. Bush 2002, 2003, 2004, 2008 • Barack Obama 2009 (2), 2011 (2), 2014, 2015 • Donald Trump 2017, 2018, 2019 (2) • Joe Biden 2024 • Donald Trump 2026
Western Europe	Germany (Note: Germany was occupied by the Allies of World War II at the time of Harry S. Truman's visit in 1945. All subsequent visits by U.S. presidents have been made to the Federal Republic of Germany, which was known colloquially as "West Germany" from 1949 to 1990 during the post World War II West–East division of Germany. No incumbent U.S. president ever visited the German Democratic Republic ("East Germany") during its existence in the same time frame.)	36	Harry Truman 1945 • Dwight Eisenhower 1959 • John F. Kennedy 1963 • Lyndon Johnson 1967 • Richard Nixon 1969 • Gerald Ford 1975 • Jimmy Carter 1978 • Ronald Reagan 1982, 1985, 1987 • George H. W. Bush 1989, 1990, 1992 • Bill Clinton 1994, 1995, 1998, 1999 (2), 2000 • George W. Bush 2002, 2005, 2006, 2007, 2008 • Barack Obama 2009 (2), 2013, 2015, 2016 (2) • Donald Trump 2017, 2018 • Joe Biden 2022, 2023 (2), 2024
Western Europe	Ireland	13	John F. Kennedy 1963 • Richard Nixon 1970 • Ronald Reagan 1984 • Bill Clinton 1995, 1998, 2000 • George W. Bush 2004, 2006 • Barack Obama 2011 • Donald Trump 2019 (2) • Joe Biden 2023 • Donald Trump 2026
Western Europe	Netherlands	6	George H. W. Bush 1989, 1991 • Bill Clinton 1997 • George W. Bush 2005 • Barack Obama 2014 • Donald Trump 2025
Western Europe	Switzerland	13	Dwight Eisenhower 1955 • Jimmy Carter 1977 • Ronald Reagan 1985 • George H. W. Bush 1990 • Bill Clinton 1994, 1998, 1999, 2000 (2) • Donald Trump 2018, 2020 • Joe Biden 2021 • Donald Trump 2026
Western Europe	United Kingdom	45	Woodrow Wilson 1918 • Harry Truman 1945 • Dwight Eisenhower 1959 (2) • John F. Kennedy 1961, 1963 • Richard Nixon 1969 (2), 1970 • Jimmy Carter 1977 • Ronald Reagan 1982, 1984, 1988 • George H. W. Bush 1989, 1990, 1991 • Bill Clinton 1994 (2), 1995, 1997, 1998 (2), 2000 • George W. Bush 2001, 2003 (2), 2005, 2008 • Barack Obama 2009, 2011, 2013, 2014, 2016 • Donald Trump 2018, 2019 (2) • Joe Biden 2021 (2), 2022 (3), 2023 (2) • Donald Trump 2025 (2)
Oceania	Australia	8	Lyndon Johnson 1966, 1967 • George H. W. Bush 1991 • Bill Clinton 1996 • George W. Bush 2003, 2007 • Barack Obama 2011, 2014
Oceania	New Zealand	2	Lyndon Johnson 1966 • Bill Clinton 1999

== See also ==
- Foreign policy of the United States
- Foreign relations of the United States
- International relations
- List of diplomatic visits to the United States
- List of international trips made by United States secretaries of state
- List of meetings between the pope and the president of the United States
