= List of diplomatic visits to the United States =

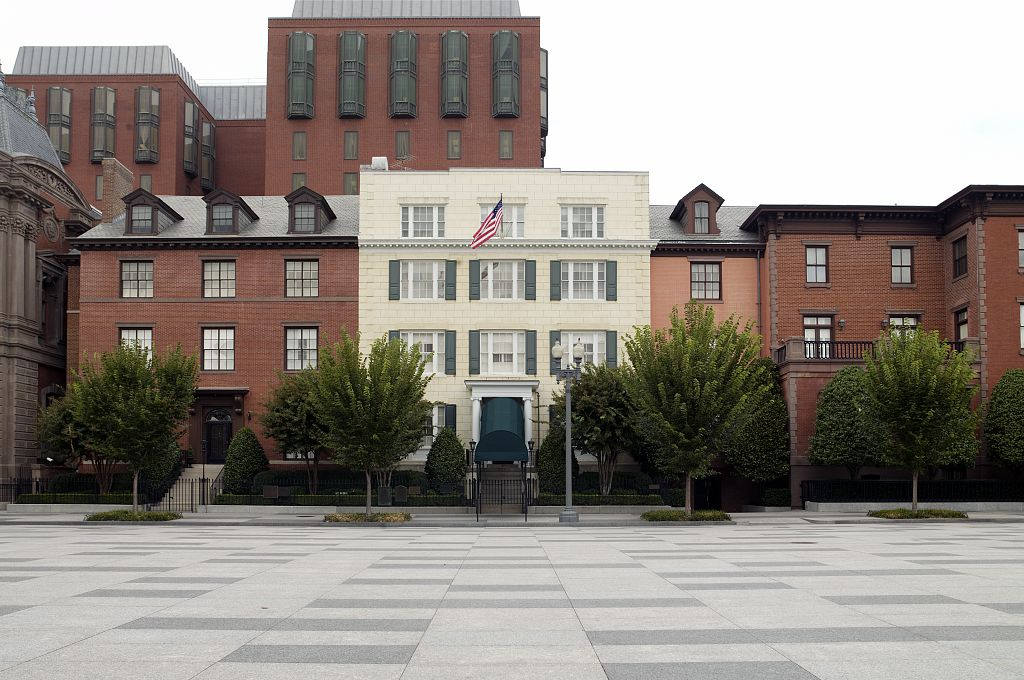
The President's Guest House, commonly known as Blair House has been the official guest house of visiting dignitaries in Washington D.C. since 1824

International trips made by the heads of state and heads of government to the United States have been a valuable part of American diplomacy and international relations since the mid-19th century. These trips are complex endeavors that often require extensive planning, coordination, and communication.

== First visits by continent ==
The first international visit to the United States was made by King Kalakaua of Hawaii in 1874, which was the first visit by a foreign chief of state or head of government.

=== South America ===
The first South American head of state to visit the United States was Emperor Pedro II of Brazil in 1876.

=== Central America ===
The first Central American head of state to visit the United States was President Justo Rufino Barrios of Guatemala in 1882.

=== Europe ===
The first European head of state to visit the United States was Albert I, Prince of Monaco in 1913 while the first head of government to visit the United States was Prime Minister Macdonald of the United Kingdom in 1929.

=== Oceania ===
The first Oceanian head of government to visit the United States was Prime Minister Billy Hughes of Australia in 1918.

=== Asia ===
The first Asian head of state to visit the United States was King Prajadhipok of Siam in 1931.

=== Africa ===
The first African head of state to visit the United States was President Edwin Barclay of Liberia in 1943.

== Visits by continent ==
- List of diplomatic visits to the United States from Africa
- List of diplomatic visits to the United States from Asia
- List of diplomatic visits to the United States from Europe
- List of diplomatic visits to the United States from North America and the Caribbean
- List of diplomatic visits to the United States from South America
- List of diplomatic visits to the United States from Oceania

== See also ==
- Foreign policy of the United States
- Foreign relations of the United States
- List of international trips made by presidents of the United States
- State visits to the United States
