= List of international presidential trips made by Bill Clinton =

This is a list of international presidential trips made by Bill Clinton, the 42nd president of the United States. Bill Clinton made 55 international trips to 72 different countries (in addition to visiting the West Bank and Gaza) during his presidency, which began on January 20, 1993 and ended on January 20, 2001.

Clinton visited six continents: Africa, Asia, Australia, Europe, North America, and South America. He took an active role in the Balkans, where he worked to promote peace and stability in and around the former Yugoslavia, and in the Middle East peace process, where he worked to promote peace between Israel and the Palestinians, as well as with the governments of neighboring nations.

== Summary ==
The number of visits per country where President Clinton travelled are:

- One visit to Albania, Argentina, Australia, Austria, Bangladesh, Barbados, Belarus, Botswana, Brazil, Brunei, Bulgaria, Chile, China (Hong Kong), Colombia, Costa Rica, Croatia, Czech Republic, Denmark, El Salvador, Finland, Ghana, Greece, Guatemala, Haiti, Honduras, Hungary, India, Indonesia, Kuwait, Latvia, Republic of Macedonia, Morocco, Netherlands, New Zealand, Nicaragua, Nigeria, Norway, Oman, Pakistan, Palestinian Authority (West Bank and Gaza), Portugal, Romania, Rwanda, Saudi Arabia, Senegal, Slovakia, Slovenia, South Africa, Syria, Tanzania, Thailand, Turkey, Uganda, Vatican City, Venezuela, Vietnam and Yugoslavia (Kosovo)
- Two visits to Belgium, Jordan, Mexico, Philippines, Poland, and Spain
- Three visits to Bosnia and Herzegovina, Ireland, South Korea, and Ukraine
- Four visits to Egypt and Israel
- Five visits to Canada, France, Japan, Russia, and Switzerland
- Six visits to Germany
- Seven visits to the United Kingdom
- Eight visits to Italy

Map of international trips made by Bill Clinton as president: United States 8 visits 6-7 visits 5 visits 4 visits 3 visits 2 visits 1 visit

== First term (1993–1997) ==
=== 1993 ===
	Country	Areas visited	Dates	Details	Image
1	Canada	Vancouver	April 3–4	Attended Summit Meeting with Russian president Boris Yeltsin. Also met with Prime Minister Brian Mulroney.	
2	Japan	Tokyo	July 6–10	Attended the 19th G7 summit. Met with Russian President Boris Yeltsin.	
2	South Korea	Seoul	July 10–11	Met with President Kim Young-sam. Addressed the South Korean National Assembly. Visited U.S. military personnel.	

=== 1994 ===
	Country	Areas visited	Dates	Details	Image
3	Belgium	Brussels	January 9–11	Attended the NATO Summit Meeting. Met with King Albert II and Prime Minister Jean-Luc Dehaene.	
3	Czech Republic	Prague	January 11–12	Met with the Presidents and Prime Ministers of the Czech Republic, Hungary, Poland and Slovakia.	
3	Ukraine	Kyiv	January 12	Met with President Leonid Kravchuk.	
3	Russia	Moscow	January 12–15	Met with President Boris Yeltsin and senior Russian officials. Signed nuclear disarmament agreement with Ukraine.	
3	Belarus	Minsk	January 15	Met with Chairman Stanislav Shushkevich.	
3	Switzerland	Geneva	January 15–16	Met with Syrian president Hafez al-Assad.	
4	Italy	Rome, Nettuno	June 2–4	Met with Prime Minister Silvio Berlusconi and President Oscar Luigi Scalfaro. Visited U.S. Military Cemetery.	
4	Vatican City	Apostolic Palace	June 2	Audience with Pope John Paul II.	
4	United Kingdom	Cambridge, London, Portsmouth	June 4–5	Visited U.S. Military Cemetery. Met with Prime Minister John Major. Attended state dinner with Queen Elizabeth II and heads of state and government of Canada, Poland, the Czech Republic, Slovakia, Australia, New Zealand, Norway and Belgium. Attended the 50th anniversary of D-Day commemorative ceremonies.	
4	France	Colleville, Paris	June 6–8	Attended the 50th anniversary of D-Day memorial ceremonies. Met with President François Mitterrand and senior French officials. Addressed the French National Assembly.	
4	United Kingdom	Oxford	June 8	Received honorary degree from Oxford University.	
5	Latvia	Riga	July 6	Met with the Presidents of the Baltic states.	
5	Poland	Warsaw	July 6–7	Addressed the Polish Parliament. Attended ceremonies commemorating the Warsaw Ghetto Uprising.	
5	Italy	Naples	July 7–10	Attended the 20th G7 summit. Met with Italian prime minister Silvio Berlusconi, Japanese prime minister Tomiichi Murayama, Canadian prime minister Jean Chrétien and Russian president Boris Yeltsin.	
5	Germany	Bonn, Ludwigshafen, Berlin	July 10–12	Met with Chancellor Helmut Kohl and German political leaders. Delivered a public address at the Brandenburg Gate. Attended deactivation ceremony for the Berlin Brigade.	
6	Egypt	Cairo	October 25–26	Met with President Hosni Mubarak and PLO Chairman Yasser Arafat.	
6	Jordan	Aqaba, Wadi Arava, Amman	October 26–27	Attended the signing of the Israel-Jordan peace agreement. Addressed the Jordanian Parliament.	
6	Syria	Damascus	October 27	Met with President Hafez al-Assad.	
6	Israel	Jerusalem	October 27–28	Met with senior Israeli officials. Addressed the Knesset.	
6	Kuwait	Kuwait City	October 28	Met with Emir Jaber Al-Ahmad Al-Sabah. Addressed U.S. military personnel.	
6	Saudi Arabia	King Khalid Military City	October 28	Met with King Fahd.	
7	Philippines	Manila, Corregidor Island	November 12–13	State visit. Met with President Fidel V. Ramos. Visited World War II battlegrounds of Corregidor Island.	
7	Indonesia	Jakarta, Bogor	November 13–16	State visit. Attended the APEC Summit Meeting.	
8	Hungary	Budapest	December 5	Attended CSCE Summit Meeting.	

=== 1995 ===
	Country	Areas visited	Dates	Details	Image
9	Canada	Ottawa	February 23–24	State visit. Met with Governor General Roméo LeBlanc and Prime Minister Jean Chrétien. Addressed Parliament.	
10	Haiti	Port-au-Prince	March 31	Attended transition ceremony for United Nations Mission in Haiti.	
11	Russia	Moscow	May 9–11	Summit meeting. Attended the 50th anniversary of VE Day ceremonies.	
11	Ukraine	Kyiv	May 11–12	State visit. Met with President Leonid Kuchma.	
12	Canada	Halifax	June 15–17	Attended the 21st G7 summit. Met with Russian President Boris Yeltsin.	
13	Israel	Jerusalem	November 5–6	Attended the funeral of Prime Minister Yitzhak Rabin.	
14	United Kingdom	London, Belfast, Derry	November 28 – December 1	Met with Queen Elizabeth II and Prime Minister John Major. Addressed Parliament. Delivered several public addresses in Northern Ireland.	
14	Ireland	Dublin	December 1–2	Met with President Mary Robinson and Taoiseach John Bruton.	
14	Germany	Baumholder	December 2	Addressed U.S. military personnel. Met with Chancellor Helmut Kohl.	
14	Spain	Madrid	December 2–3	Attended the European Union Summit Meeting.	
15	France	Paris	December 14	Attended the signing of the Bosnian peace treaty.	

=== 1996 ===
	Country	Areas visited	Dates	Details	Image
16	Italy	Aviano Air Base	January 13	Met with U.S. military personnel.	
16	Hungary	Taszár	January 13	Met with U.S. military personnel.	
16	Bosnia and Herzegovina	Tuzla	January 13	Met with President Alija Izetbegovic. Addressed U.S. military personnel.	
16	Croatia	Zagreb	January 13	Met with President Franjo Tudjman.	
17	Egypt	Sharm el-Sheikh	March 13	Attended the Summit of the Peacemakers.	
17	Israel	Jerusalem, Tel Aviv	March 13–14	Discussed cooperation against terrorism with senior Israeli officials.	
18	South Korea	Cheju Island	April 15–16	Met with President Kim Young-sam. Proposed four-nation peace talks.	
18	Japan	Tokyo	April 16–18	State visit. Issued joint statement on U.S.-Japanese security relations. Addressed the Diet and U.S. Navy personnel.	
18	Russia	Saint Petersburg, Moscow	April 18–21	Attended the G-7 summit on nuclear safety. Summit Meeting with President Boris Yeltsin.	
19	France	Lyon, Pérouges, Paris	June 27–29	Attended the 22nd G7 summit. Met with Russian prime minister Viktor Chernomyrdin and UN secretary-general Boutros Boutros-Ghali.	
20	Australia	Sydney, Canberra, Port Douglas	November 19–23	State visit. Addressed joint meeting of Parliament. Visited the Great Barrier Reef.	
20	Philippines	Manila, Subic	November 24–25	Attended the APEC Summit Meeting. The President stayed in the MacArthur Suite at the Manila Hotel during his visit.	
20	Thailand	Bangkok	November 25–26	State visit.	

== Second term (1997–2001) ==
=== 1997 ===
	Country	Areas visited	Dates	Details	Image
21	Finland	Helsinki	March 20–21	Summit meeting with Russian president Boris Yeltsin. Also met with President Martti Ahtisaari.	
22	Mexico	Mexico City, Tlaxcala	May 5–7	State visit. Met with President Ernesto Zedillo.	
22	Costa Rica	San José	May 7–9	Attended the Summit Meeting of Presidents of the Central American Republics. Met President José María Figueres and travelled to Braulio Carrillo National Park.	
22	Barbados	Bridgetown	May 9–11	Attended the U.S.-Caribbean Community summit meeting. Signed the Partnership for Prosperity and Security in the Caribbean pact.	
23	France	Paris	May 26–27	Attended the NATO Summit Meeting and the signing of the NATO-Russia Founding Act.	
23	Netherlands	The Hague, Rotterdam	May 27–28	Attended the U.S.-EU Summit Meeting. Attended the 50th anniversary of the Marshall Plan.	
23	United Kingdom	London	May 28–29	Met with Prime Minister Tony Blair. Attended a Cabinet meeting.	
24	Spain	Palma de Majorca, Madrid, Granada	July 4–10	Vacationed with King Juan Carlos I and Queen Sophia. Attended the NATO Summit Meeting in Madrid.	
24	Poland	Warsaw	July 10–11	Met with President Aleksander Kwaśniewski and former president Lech Wałęsa.	
24	Romania	Bucharest	July 11	Met with President Emil Constantinescu and Romanian political leaders.	
24	Denmark	Copenhagen	July 11–12	Met with Queen Margrethe II and Prime Minister Poul Nyrup Rasmussen.	
25	Venezuela	Caracas	October 12–13	Met with President Rafael Caldera.	
25	Brazil	Brasília, São Paulo, Rio de Janeiro	October 13–15	Met with President Fernando Henrique Cardoso. Delivered several public addresses.	
25	Argentina	Buenos Aires, San Carlos de Bariloche	October 15–18	Met with President Carlos Menem. Delivered several public addresses.	
26	Canada	Vancouver	November 23–25	Attended the APEC Summit Meeting.	
27	Italy	Aviano Air Base	December 22	Stopped en route to Bosnia-Herzegovina.	
27	Bosnia and Herzegovina	Sarajevo, Tuzla	December 22	Met with the Bosnian Collective Presidency and Bosnian Serb President Biljana Plavšić. Visited U.S. military personnel.	
27	Italy	Aviano Air Base	December 22	Stopped during return to Washington D.C..	

=== 1998 ===
	Country	Areas visited	Dates	Details	Image
28	Ghana	Accra	March 23	Met with President Jerry Rawlings. Visited a Peace Corps project.	
28	Uganda	Kampala, Kisowera, Mukono Town, Wanyange, Entebbe	March 23–25	Met with President Yoweri Museveni and the Presidents of Ethiopia, Rwanda, Tanzania, Kenya and the Congo.	
28	Rwanda	Kigali	March 25	Met with President Pasteur Bizimungu. Delivered a public address.	
28	South Africa	Cape Town, Johannesburg	March 25–29	Met with President Nelson Mandela. Addressed joint session of Parliament.	
28	Botswana	Gaborone, Kasame	March 29–31	Met with President Quett Masire. Visited Chobe National Park.	
28	Senegal	Dakar, Thiès, Gorée Island	March 31 – April 2	Met with President Abdou Diouf. Visited Senegalese peacekeeping troops. Delivered several public addresses.	
29	Chile	Santiago	April 16–19	State visit. Attended the 2nd Summit of the Americas.	
30	Germany	Berlin, Potsdam, Frankfurt, Eisenach	May 12–14	Met with Chancellor Helmut Kohl. Attended 50th anniversary of the Berlin Airlift.	
30	United Kingdom	Birmingham, Weston-under-Lizard, London	May 14–18	Attended the 24th G8 summit and the US-EU summit meetings.	
30	Switzerland	Geneva	May 18	Attended the WTO meeting commemorating the 50th anniversary of GATT.	
31	China	Xi'an, Beijing, Shanghai, Guilin, Hong Kong	June 24 – July 3	State visit. Met with General Secretary of the Chinese Communist Party Jiang Zemin. Visited the Forbidden City and the Great Wall of China. Delivered a speech at Peking University.	
32	Russia	Moscow	September 1–3	Summit meeting with President Boris Yeltsin.	
32	United Kingdom	Belfast, Armagh, Omagh	September 3	Met with Prime Minister Tony Blair and Northern Irish political leaders. Addressed the Northern Ireland Assembly.	
32	Ireland	Dublin, Adare, Limerick, Ballybunion	September 3–5	Met with Taoiseach Bertie Ahern. Delivered several public addresses and played golf.	
33	Japan	Tokyo	November 19–20	Met with Emperor Akihito and Prime Minister Keizō Obuchi. Addressed American Chamber of Commerce.	
33	South Korea	Seoul, Osan	November 20–22	Met with President Kim Dae-jung. Addressed U.S. military personnel. Visited Guam during his return to attend a World War II wreath-laying ceremony.	
34	Israel	Jerusalem, Masada	December 12–15	Met with Prime Minister Benjamin Netanyahu and senior Israeli officials.	
34	Palestinian National Authority	Gaza, Bethlehem, Erez	December 14–15	Addressed Palestine National Council. Attended a meeting with Prime Minister Benjamin Netanyahu and Chairman Yasser Arafat.	

=== 1999 ===
	Country	Areas visited	Dates	Details	Image
35	Jordan	Amman	February 8	Attended the funeral of King Hussein.	
36	Mexico	Mérida	February 14–15	State visit. Met with President Ernesto Zedillo.	
37	Nicaragua	Managua, Posoltega, El Porvenir	March 8	Discussed reconstruction aid with President Arnoldo Aleman.	
37	Honduras	Soto Cano Air Base, Tegucigalpa	March 8–9	Discussed reconstruction aid with President Carlos Roberto Flores. Addressed U.S. military personnel.	
37	El Salvador	San Salvador	March 10	Addressed Legislative Assembly.	
37	Guatemala	Guatemala City, Antigua	March 10–11	Attended the Central American Summit.	
38	Belgium	Brussels	May 4	Discussed the Kosovo War with NATO officials.	
38	Germany	Frankfurt, Ramstein Air Base, Spangdahlem Air Base, Bonn, Ingelheim	May 4–6	Addressed U.S. military personnel; met with Chancellor Gerhard Schröder; met with Kosovo War refugees.	
39	Switzerland	Geneva	June 16	Addressed ILO Conference. Met with President Ruth Dreifuss.	
39	France	Paris	June 16–17	Discussed peacekeeping in Kosovo with President Jacques Chirac and Prime Minister Lionel Jospin.	
39	Germany	Cologne, Bonn	June 17–21	Attended the 25th G8 summit.	
39	Slovenia	Ljubljana	June 21–22	Met with President Milan Kučan, Prime Minister Janez Drnovšek and Montenegrin President Milo Đukanović.	
39	Republic of Macedonia	Skopje	June 22	Met with President Kiro Gligorov. Addressed Kosovar refugees and NATO military personnel.	
39	Italy	Aviano Air Base	June 22	Addressed U.S. military personnel.	
40	Morocco	Rabat	July 25	Attended the funeral of King Hassan II. Met with Palestinian Authority president Yasser Arafat and Israeli prime minister Ehud Barak.	
41	Italy	Aviano Air Base	July 29–30	Stopped en route to Sarajevo.	
41	Bosnia and Herzegovina	Sarajevo	July 30	Attended Stability Pact Leaders Conference.	
41	Italy	Aviano Air Base	July 30	Stopped during return to Washington D.C..	
42	New Zealand	Auckland, Queenstown, Christchurch	September 11–15	Attended the APEC Summit Meeting. State Visit.	
43	Canada	Ottawa, Mont-Tremblant	October 7–8	Met with Prime Minister Jean Chrétien and Quebec Premier Lucien Bouchard. Attended Federalism Conference at Mont Tremblant. Dedicated new U.S. Embassy building.	
44	Norway	Oslo	November 1–2	State visit. Held discussions with Prime Minister Kjell Magne Bondevik Attended commemorative ceremony for former Israeli prime minister Yitzhak Rabin. Met with Russian prime minister Vladimir Putin; also met with Palestinian Authority chairman Yasser Arafat and Prime Minister Ehud Barak of Israel.	
45	Turkey	Ankara, İzmit, Ephesus, Istanbul	November 15–19	State visit. Attended Organization for Security and Cooperation in Europe Summit meeting.	
45	Greece	Athens	November 19–20	State visit. Met with Prime Minister Konstantinos Simitis.	
45	Italy	Florence	November 20–21	Attended conference on Progressive Governance for the 21st Century.	
45	Bulgaria	Sofia	November 21–23	Met with President Petar Stoyanov and Prime Minister Ivan Kostov.	
45	(Federal Republic of Yugoslavia) Yugoslavia (Kosovo)	Pristina, Uroševac, Camp Bondsteel	November 23	Met with Kosovar Transitional Council. Addressed the Albanian community and U.S. military personnel.	
45	Italy	Aviano Air Base	November 23	Stopped during return to Washington D.C..	

=== 2000 ===
	Country	Areas visited	Dates	Details	Image
46	Switzerland	Davos	January 29	Addressed the World Economic Forum.	
47	Italy	Aviano Air Base	March 18	Stopped en route to India.	
47	India	New Delhi, Agra, Jaipur, Hyderabad, Mumbai	March 19–25	Met with President Kocheril Raman Narayanan. Signed Joint Statement on Energy and the Environment. Addressed the Indian Parliament.	
47	Bangladesh	Dhaka	March 20	Met with President Shahabuddin Ahmed and Prime Minister Sheikh Hasina.	
47	Pakistan	Islamabad	March 25	Met with President Muhammad Rafiq Tarar and General Pervez Musharraf. Delivered radio address.	
47	Oman	Muscat	March 25	Met with Sultan Qaboos bin Said.	
47	Switzerland	Geneva	March 25	Met with Syrian President Hafez al-Assad.	
48	Portugal	Lisbon	May 30 – June 1	Attended the U.S.-EU Summit Meeting. Met with Israeli Prime Minister Ehud Barak.	
48	Germany	Berlin, Aachen	June 1–3	Met with President Johannes Rau and Chancellor Schröder; received Charlemagne Prize, and attended a Third Way Conference.	
48	Russia	Moscow	June 3–5	Summit meeting with President Vladimir Putin. Addressed the Duma.	
48	Ukraine	Kyiv	June 5	Met with President Leonid Kuchma.	
49	Japan	Tokyo	June 8	Attended the funeral of former Prime Minister Keizō Obuchi.	
50	Japan	Nago	July 21–23	Attended the 26th G8 summit.	
51	Nigeria	Abuja, Ushafa	August 26–28	Met with President Olusegun Obasanjo. Addressed the National Assembly.	
51	Tanzania	Arusha	August 28–29	Met with former South African president Nelson Mandela to promote a peace agreement for Burundi. Met with President Benjamin Mkapa.	
51	Egypt	Cairo	August 29	Briefed President Hosni Mubarak on the Middle East Peace Process.	
52	Colombia	Cartagena	August 30	Met with President Andrés Pastrana Arango.	
53	Egypt	Sharm el-Sheikh	October 16–17	Attended the Israeli-Palestinian Summit Meeting.	
54	Brunei	Bandar Seri Begawan	November 14–16	Attended the APEC Summit Meeting.	
54	Vietnam	Hanoi, Tien Chau, Ho Chi Minh City	November 16–19	Met with General Secretary of the Communist Party of Vietnam Lê Khả Phiêu. Also met with President Tran Duc Luong. Delivered several public addresses.	
55	Ireland	Dublin, Dundalk	December 12	Met with Taoiseach Bertie Ahern. Delivered several public addresses.	
55	United Kingdom	Belfast, London, Coventry	December 12–14	Met with Prime Minister Tony Blair and Northern Irish political leaders in Belfast. Met with Queen Elizabeth II and delivered a speech at the University of Warwick.	

== Multilateral meetings ==
Multilateral meetings of the following intergovernmental organizations took place during Bill Clinton's presidency (1993–2001).

Group	Year							
Group	1993	1994	1995	1996	1997	1998	1999	2000
APEC	November 19–20 (United States) Seattle	November 15–16 (Indonesia) Bogor	November 18–19^{[a]} (Japan) Osaka	November 24–25 (Philippines) Subic	November 24–25 (Canada) Vancouver	November 17–18^{[b]} (Malaysia) Kuala Lumpur	September 12–13 (New Zealand) Auckland	November 15–16 (Brunei) Bandar Seri Begawan
G7 / G8	July 7–9 (Japan) Tokyo	July 8–10 (Italy) Naples	June 15–17 (Canada) Halifax	June 27–29 (France) Lyon	June 20–22 (United States) Denver	May 15–17 (United Kingdom) Birmingham	June 18–20 (Germany) Cologne	July 21–23 (Japan) Nago
NATO	none	January 10–11 (Belgium) Brussels	none	none	May 27 (France) Paris	none	April 23–25 (United States) Washington	none
NATO	none	January 10–11 (Belgium) Brussels	none	none	July 8–9 (Spain) Madrid	none	April 23–25 (United States) Washington	none
SOA (OAS)	none	December 9–11 (United States) Miami	none	none	none	April 18–19 (Chile) Santiago	none	none
OSCE	none	December 5–6 (Hungary) Budapest	none	December 2–3 (Portugal) Lisbon	none	none	November 18–19 (Turkey) Istanbul	none
Others	none	none	U.S.–EU Summit; December 2–3 (Spain) Madrid	none	Central American Summit; May 7–9 (Costa Rica) San José	none	Central American Summit; March 10–11; Antigua Guatemala	U.S.–EU Summit; May 30–June 1 (Portugal) Lisbon
Others	none	none	U.S.–EU Summit; December 2–3 (Spain) Madrid	none	U.S.–EU Summit; May 27–28 (Netherlands) The Hague	none	Central American Summit; March 10–11; Antigua Guatemala	U.S.–EU Summit; May 30–June 1 (Portugal) Lisbon
██ = Did not attend; ██ = No meeting held.^aAl Gore attended in the President's place due to the US government shutdown. • ^bAl Gore attended in the President's place due to the ongoing impeachment inquiry.

== See also ==
- Foreign policy of the Clinton administration
- Foreign policy of the United States
- List of international trips made by Warren Christopher as United States Secretary of State
- List of international trips made by Madeleine Albright as United States Secretary of State
