= List of presidential trips made by Bill Clinton (1994) =

This is a list of presidential trips made by Bill Clinton during 1994, the second year of his presidency as the 42nd president of the United States. International trips are highlighted in blue.

This list excludes trips made within Washington, D.C., the U.S. federal capital in which the White House, the official residence and principal workplace of the president, is located. It also excludes the capital's immediate surroundings in Maryland and Virginia, such as Andrews Air Force Base in Maryland, where the president typically boards Air Force One for all trips outside the area. Also excluded are trips to Camp David, the country residence of the president.

== January ==
State or country	Areas visited	Dates	Details
South Carolina	Hilton Head	December 29–January 2	Holiday vacation.
Arkansas	Hot Springs, Hope	January 6–8	Traveled to the home of his mother Virginia Clinton Kelley, who died on January 6, and attended a memorial service for her at the Hot Springs Convention Center and her burial at Rose Hill Cemetery in Hope. Kelley's death forced Clinton to cancel his travel plans for January 6, which were to travel to Milwaukee, Wisconsin to deliver a foreign policy speech to the University of Wisconsin–Milwaukee Institute of World Affairs at the Pabst Theater and to attend a rally celebrating the Wisconsin Badgers football team winning the 1994 Rose Bowl at Washington High School. Vice President Al Gore completed these engagements in Clinton's place.
Belgium	Brussels	January 9–11	Attended the NATO Summit Meeting. Met with King Albert II and Prime Minister Jean-Luc Dehaene.
Czech Republic	Prague	January 11–12	Met with the presidents and prime ministers of the Czech Republic, Hungary, Poland and Slovakia.
Ukraine	Kyiv	January 12	Met with President Leonid Kravchuk.
Russia	Moscow	January 12–15	Met with President Boris Yeltsin and senior Russian officials. Signed nuclear disarmament agreement with Ukraine.
Belarus	Minsk	January 15	Met with Chairman Stanislav Shushkevich.
Switzerland	Geneva	January 15–16	Met with Syrian president Hafez al-Assad.
California	Burbank	January 19	Surveyed damage from the 1994 Northridge earthquake two days earlier.
Maryland	Piney Point	January 28	Attended the House Democratic Caucus Issues Conference luncheon at the Paul Hall Center for Maritime Training and Education.

== February ==
State or country	Areas visited	Dates	Details
Texas	Houston	February 6–7	Attended the Cattle Baron's Ball at the Four Seasons Hotel Houston and a gala dinner at the Wortham Theater Center. Visited a Chuy's restaurant. Stayed at the Wyndham Warwick Hotel. Addressed the Greater Houston Partnership at the Hyatt Regency Houston Downtown. Visited the Lyndon B. Johnson Space Center, where he telephoned the STS-60 astronaut crew aboard Space Shuttle Discovery.
Louisiana	Shreveport	February 7–8	Stayed at the Remington Hotel. Spoke to workers at the General Motors Shreveport Assembly and Stamping Plant.
Arkansas	Hot Springs	February 12–13	Visited his stepfather Richard Kelley.
Ohio	London	February 15	Toured the Ohio Peace Officers Training Academy Defense Training Center.
New Jersey	Edison	February 16	Addressed the American Association of Retired Persons at Middlesex County College.
Connecticut	Norwich	February 24	Visited a local business, Greenville Drug Store. Spoke about health care reform at Norwich Free Academy.
Illinois	Chicago, Country Club Hills	February 28	Participated in a roundtable discussion on crime at Wilbur Wright College. Took questions at Hillcrest High School.
Pennsylvania	Pittsburgh	February 28	Hosted British prime minister John Major at the Tin Angel Restaurant.

== March ==
State or country	Areas visited	Dates	Details
New York	New York	March 10	Spoke at an AmeriCorps public safety forum at Brooklyn College. Attended a United Negro College Fund dinner at the Sheraton New York Hotel and Towers. Met with New York Police Department officers who had responded to the 1994 Brooklyn Bridge shooting nine days earlier.
Michigan	Detroit	March 13–14	Toured the Focus: HOPE Center for Advanced Technologies. Attended the G7 Jobs Conference at the Westin Hotel and at the Fox Theatre. Spoke to workers at the Detroit Diesel plant.
Massachusetts	Boston	March 14	Spoke at Rowes Wharf. Attended a gala dinner at the Boston Park Plaza Hotel.
New Hampshire	Nashua, Keene	March 14–15	Stayed at the Sheraton Tara Hotel. Spoke about health care reform at Elm Street Junior High School in Nashua. Visited a Markem Corporation packaging plant in Keene.
New York	Fort Drum	March 15	Met with servicemembers returning from the United Nations Operation in Somalia II.
Florida	Fisher Island, Deerfield Beach, Bal Harbour	March 20–21	Stayed on Fisher Island. Attended a health care forum at the Century Village East retirement community in Deerfield Beach. Attended a dinner at the Sheraton Bal Harbour.
North Carolina	Fort Bragg	March 25	Toured the crash site of the Green Ramp disaster two days earlier at Pope Air Force Base. Visited servicemembers injured in the crash at Womack Army Medical Center.
Texas	Dallas	March 25–27	Stayed at the Mansion on Turtle Creek. Visited patients and their families at the Scottish Rite Hospital for Children. Attended the Midwest regional final of the 1994 NCAA Division I men's basketball tournament at Reunion Arena, where Clinton's favored team, the Arkansas Razorbacks, won.
California	San Diego	March 27–April 2	Visited Zamorano Elementary School, where he signed the Goals 2000 Act into law. Toured the San Diego Zoo Safari Park.

== April ==
State or country	Areas visited	Dates	Details
North Carolina	Charlotte	April 2	Attended the semifinal of the NCAA Division I men's basketball tournament at the Charlotte Coliseum, where the Arkansas Razorbacks won.
Ohio	Cleveland	April 4	Threw out the ceremonial first pitch on the Opening Day of Major League Baseball at the new Jacobs Field stadium.
North Carolina	Charlotte, Troy	April 4–5	Attended the final of the NCAA Division I men's basketball tournament at the Charlotte Coliseum, where the Arkansas Razorbacks won their first national championship. Visited patients at Montgomery County Hospital in Troy. Sat down for an interview at WCNC-TV studios.
Kentucky	Bowling Green	April 6	Attended the funeral of Representative William Natcher at Eastwood Baptist Church.
Kansas	Topeka	April 7	Participated in a roundtable discussion on health care at a local business, Topeka Foundry and Ironworks Company, with Kansas governor Joan Finney.
Missouri	Kansas City	April 7	Participated in a townhall meeting on health care reform at KCTV studios.
Minnesota	Minneapolis, St. Paul	April 7–8	Stayed at the Marquette Hotel. Attended a health care reform rally at the IDS Tower. Sat down for an interview with the Star Tribune editorial board at the newspaper's offices. Participated in a townhall meeting on health care reform at KSTP-TV studios.
Virginia	Williamsburg	April 16	Attended the Senate Democratic Policy Committee Annual Issues Retreat at Kingsmill Resort.
North Carolina	Charlotte	April 17	Attended an event celebrating the 30th anniversary of the launch of the Ford Mustang at Charlotte Motor Speedway.
Wisconsin	Milwaukee	April 18	Attended a demonstration of Ameritech's Wisconsin Health Information Network at the Italian Community Center. Visited Leon's Frozen Custard.
California	Yorba Linda	April 27	Attended the state funeral of former president Richard Nixon at the Richard Nixon Presidential Library and Museum.

== May ==
State or country	Areas visited	Dates	Details
Georgia	Atlanta	May 3	Spoke at the CNN Center. Visited former president Jimmy Carter at the Carter Center.
New York	New York	May 9	Spoke to workers the Pathmark supermarket on Cherry Street (now the site of One Manhattan Square). Took questions from the Association for a Better New York at the New York Hilton Midtown.
Rhode Island	Cranston	May 9	Participated in a townhall meeting at WJAR studios.
Indiana	Indianapolis	May 14	Attended the groundbreaking ceremony for the Landmark for Peace Memorial. Spoke at a Jefferson–Jackson Dinner at the Indiana Convention Center. Met with Irish prime minister Albert Reynolds at Mount Helm Baptist Church.
California	Los Angeles, Beverly Hills, Sacramento	May 20–22	Gave the commencement address at the University of California, Los Angeles' Pauley Pavilion, marking the university's 75th anniversary. Attended a fundraiser for Senator Dianne Feinstein at Ronald Burkle's home in Beverly Hills. Attended a DCCC fundraiser at a private residence in Sacramento.
Maryland	Annapolis	May 25	Gave the commencement address at the United States Naval Academy's Navy–Marine Corps Memorial Stadium.

== June ==
State or country	Areas visited	Dates	Details
Italy	Rome, Nettuno	June 2–4	Met with Prime Minister Silvio Berlusconi and President Oscar Luigi Scalfaro. Visited U.S. Military Cemetery.
Vatican City	Apostolic Palace	June 2	Audience with Pope John Paul II.
United Kingdom	Cambridge, London, Portsmouth	June 4–5	Visited U.S. Military Cemetery. Met with Prime Minister John Major. Attended state dinner with Queen Elizabeth II and heads of state and government of Canada, Poland, the Czech Republic, Slovakia, Australia, New Zealand, Norway and Belgium. Attended the 50th anniversary of D-Day commemorative ceremonies.
France	Colleville, Paris	June 6–8	Attended the 50th anniversary of D-Day memorial ceremonies. Met with President François Mitterrand and senior French officials. Addressed the French National Assembly.
United Kingdom	Oxford	June 8	Received honorary degree from Oxford University.
Missouri	Kansas City	June 14	Gave a speech on welfare reform at Commerce Bancshares.
Illinois	Chicago	June 16–17	Attended a fundraising dinner at the Chicago Hilton and Towers. Toured the Robert Taylor Homes public housing development. Attended the opening match of the 1994 FIFA World Cup at Soldier Field.
Missouri	St. Louis	June 24	Rode the new MetroLink Red Line extension, which opened to the public the next day, from Lambert International Airport to Union Station. Toured the Fox Park neighborhood, where he met with participants in the Summer of Safety program. Met with Children's Defense Fund scholarship recipients from East St. Louis, Illinois, at the Adam's Mark hotel, where he also attended a fundraiser for Representative Dick Gephardt.
New York	New York	June 27	Attended a DNC dinner at the St. Regis New York.

== July ==
State or country	Areas visited	Dates	Details
Latvia	Riga	July 6	Met with the presidents of the Baltic states.
Poland	Warsaw	July 6–7	Addressed the Polish Parliament. Attended ceremonies commemorating the Warsaw Ghetto Uprising.
Italy	Naples	July 7–10	Attended the 20th G7 summit. Met with Italian prime minister Silvio Berlusconi, Japanese prime minister Tomiichi Murayama, Canadian prime minister Jean Chrétien and Russian president Boris Yeltsin.
Germany	Bonn, Ludwigshafen, Berlin	July 10–12	Met with Chancellor Helmut Kohl and German political leaders. Delivered a public address at the Brandenburg Gate. Attended deactivation ceremony for the Berlin Brigade.
Georgia	Albany	July 13	Surveyed damage from flooding caused by Tropical Storm Alberto. Announced federal relief for the affected areas.
Pennsylvania	Greensburg, Philadelphia	July 15	Spoke about health care reform at the Westmoreland County Courthouse square. Attended a gala dinner at the Public Ledger Building.
Florida	Miami	July 18	Addressed a meeting of the Executive Committee of the Summit of the Americas at the Sheraton Bal Harbour. Spoke to the National Council of La Raza at the Miami Beach Convention Center.
Maine	Portland	July 18	Attended Democratic Party receptions at the Holiday Inn By The Bay and at the Sonesta Portland Hotel.
Massachusetts	Boston	July 18–19	Addressed the National Governors Association conference at the Hynes Convention Center.
Arkansas	Hot Springs	July 23–24	Attended his 30th class reunion at Hot Springs High School.
Missouri	Independence	July 30	Visited a Health Security Express campaign bus at the Truman Courthouse. Toured the Harry S. Truman Presidential Library and Museum.
Ohio	Mayfield Heights	July 30	Campaigned for Joel Hyatt for Senate at the Landerhaven Country Club.

== August ==
State or country	Areas visited	Dates	Details
New Jersey	Jersey City	August 1	Spoke about health care reform at Liberty State Park.
Michigan	Detroit	August 6	Attended a reception at the Westin Hotel.
Minnesota	Minneapolis	August 12	Addressed the National Association of Police Organizations convention at the Minneapolis Marriott City Center Hotel.
Massachusetts	Martha's Vineyard	August 26–September 7	Summer vacation, during which time the White House was remodeled. Upon returning to Washington, Clinton stayed at the Blair House until the remodeling was completed on September 12.

== September ==
State or country	Areas visited	Dates	Details
Maine	Bath	September 5	Observed Labor Day at the Bath Iron Works, where he toured the USS Laboon while it was under construction.
Louisiana	New Orleans	September 9	Addressed the National Baptist Convention at the Ernest N. Morial Convention Center. Attended the DNC Business Leadership Forum luncheon and met with the executive board of the National Conference of Black Mayors.
Maryland	Aberdeen	September 11	Visited National Civilian Community Corps trainees at the Aberdeen Proving Ground.
Illinois	Chicago	September 23–24	Attended a DSCC dinner at the Ritz-Carlton Chicago.
Minnesota	Minneapolis	September 24	Campaigned for Ann Wynia for Senate at the Minneapolis Convention Center.
Missouri	Kansas City	September 24	Campaigned for Alan Wheat for Senate at the Ritz-Carlton Country Club Plaza.
New York	New York	September 24–26	Spoke at the Greater Bethel AME Church. Attended a DCCC dinner at the Waldorf Astoria New York. Addressed the opening session of the 49th United Nations General Assembly.

== October ==
State or country	Areas visited	Dates	Details
Virginia	Norfolk	October 6	Toured the United States Atlantic Command headquarters, where he was briefed on Operation Uphold Democracy in Haiti.
Michigan	Dearborn, Detroit	October 11	Spoke to workers at the Ford River Rouge complex. Met with United Auto Workers leadership at the Westin Renaissance Center.
Connecticut	Bridgeport	October 15	Campaigned for Bill Curry for Governor at the Holiday Inn.
Florida	Miami	October 15	Campaigned for his brother-in-law Hugh Rodham for Senate at a private residence. Addressed the National Medical Association 100th annual conference in Washington, D.C., by telephone from PortMiami.
New Mexico	Albuquerque	October 17	Addressed the International Association of Chiefs of Police at the Albuquerque Convention Center.
New York	New York	October 19	Campaigned for Governor Mario Cuomo and addressed the Governor's Leadership Conference at the Sheraton New York Hotel.
Massachusetts	Framingham	October 20	Signed the Improving America's Schools Act of 1994 at Framingham High School. Attended a Democratic campaign rally at the Framingham Memorial Building.
California	Belmont, San Francisco	October 22	Signed a directive requiring strict enforcement of the zero-tolerance provisions of the Improving America's Schools Act at Carlmont High School. Campaigned for Kathleen Brown for Governor at the Fairmont San Francisco.
Washington	Seattle	October 22–23	Attended a Democratic campaign rally at the Seattle Center. Visited University Presbyterian Church.
Ohio	Cleveland, Akron	October 23–24	Took questions at the City Club of Cleveland. Campaigned for Ohio attorney general Lee Fisher at the Ritz-Carlton Cleveland. Toured the construction site of Inventure Place in Akron. Campaigned for Representative Tom Sawyer at the Akron Civic Theatre.
Egypt	Cairo	October 25–26	Met with President Hosni Mubarak and PLO Chairman Yasser Arafat.
Jordan	Aqaba, Wadi Arava, Amman	October 26–27	Attended the signing of the Israel-Jordan peace agreement. Addressed the Jordanian Parliament.
Syria	Damascus	October 27	Met with President Hafez al-Assad.
Israel	Jerusalem	October 27–28	Met with senior Israeli officials. Addressed the Knesset.
Kuwait	Kuwait City	October 28	Met with Emir Jaber Al-Ahmad Al-Sabah. Addressed U.S. military personnel.
Saudi Arabia	King Khalid Military City	October 28	Met with King Fahd.
Pennsylvania	Philadelphia, Pittsburgh	October 31	Campaigned for Senator Harris Wofford at Philadelphia City Hall and at the David L. Lawrence Convention Center.

== November ==
State or country	Areas visited	Dates	Details
Michigan	Dearborn, Detroit	November 1	Participated in a roundtable discussion on the Federal Direct Student Loan Program at the University of Michigan–Dearborn student union. Attended a Democratic campaign rally at the Cobo Convention & Exhibition Center, and a luncheon for Representative Bob Carr at the Westin Renaissance Center.
Ohio	Cleveland	November 1	Attended a Democratic campaign rally at the Antioch Baptist Church.
Rhode Island	Pawtucket, Providence	November 2	Spoke to seniors at the Portuguese Social Club in Pawtucket. Attended a Democratic campaign rally at the Rhode Island Convention Center.
New York	Albany	November 3	Spoke at the State University of New York at Albany Uptown Campus Center, and attended a Democratic campaign rally at the university's Physical Education Building.
Iowa	Des Moines	November 3	Attended a Democratic campaign reception at the Savery Hotel.
Minnesota	Duluth	November 3–4	Spoke at the Holiday Inn. Attended a Democratic campaign rally at the University of Minnesota Duluth's Romano Gymnasium.
California	Los Alamitos, Los Angeles, Anaheim, Oakland	November 4–6	Spoke at Naval Air Station Los Alamitos. Attended a Democratic campaign rally at Los Angeles City Hall. Addressed the National Association of Realtors convention at the Anaheim Convention Center. Attended a Democratic campaign rally at the Henry J. Kaiser Convention Center.
Washington	Seattle	November 6	Attended a Democratic campaign rally at Pike Place Market. Interviewed on Larry King Live at the offices of Columbia DuBrin Realty Advisors.
Minnesota	Minneapolis	November 6–7	Attended a Democratic campaign rally at North Hennepin Community College.
Michigan	Flint	November 7	Attended a Democratic campaign rally at the University of Michigan–Flint.
Delaware	Wilmington	November 7	Attended a Democratic campaign rally in Rodney Square.
Alaska	Anchorage	November 11	Stopover at Elmendorf Air Force Base on the way to the Philippines.
Philippines	Manila, Corregidor Island	November 12–13	State visit. Met with President Fidel V. Ramos. Visited World War II battlegrounds of Corregidor Island.
Indonesia	Jakarta, Bogor	November 13–16	State visit. Attended the APEC Summit Meeting.
Hawaii	Honolulu	November 16–19	Extended stopover at Hickam Air Force Base on the way home from Indonesia. Attended a gala benefit for the Hawaii Children's Discovery Center at the Hilton Hawaiian Village.

== December ==
State or country	Areas visited	Dates	Details
Hungary	Budapest	December 5	Attended CSCE Summit Meeting.
Florida	Miami	December 8–11	Stayed at the Sheraton Bal Harbour. Attended the 1st Summit of the Americas at the Miami Biltmore Hotel and at the Miami Beach Convention Center. Signed the Conjunta Centroamerica-USA Agreement (CONCAUSA) at the Vizcaya Museum and Gardens. Attended the Concert of the Americas at the James L. Knight Center.
South Carolina	Hilton Head	December 31–January 1	Holiday vacation.
