= List of international trips made by Warren Christopher as United States Secretary of State =

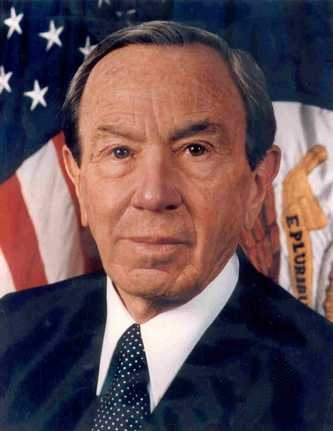
Official portrait of Warren Christopher as Secretary of State, 1993

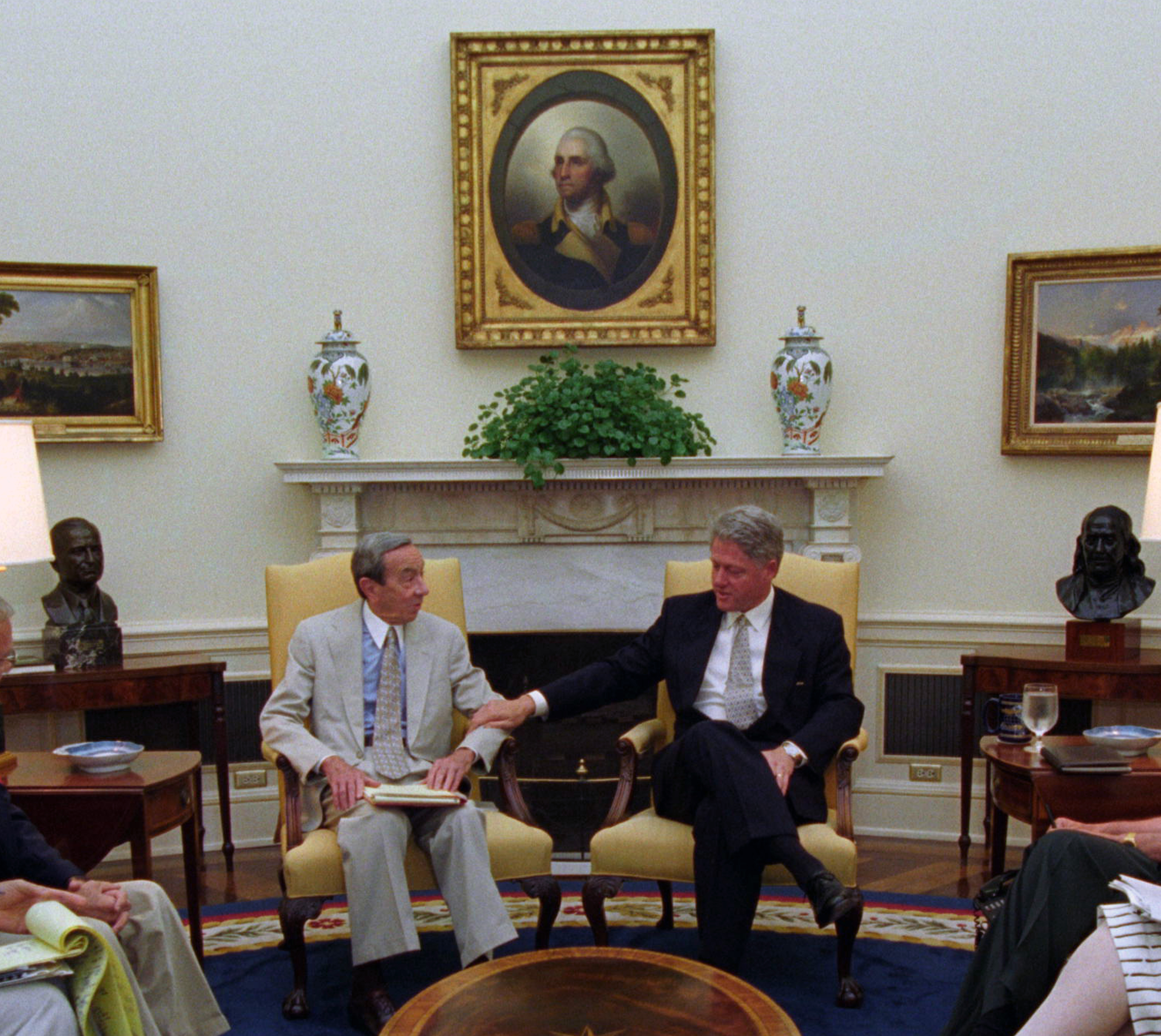
President Clinton and Secretary Christopher discuss Bosnia in the Oval Office

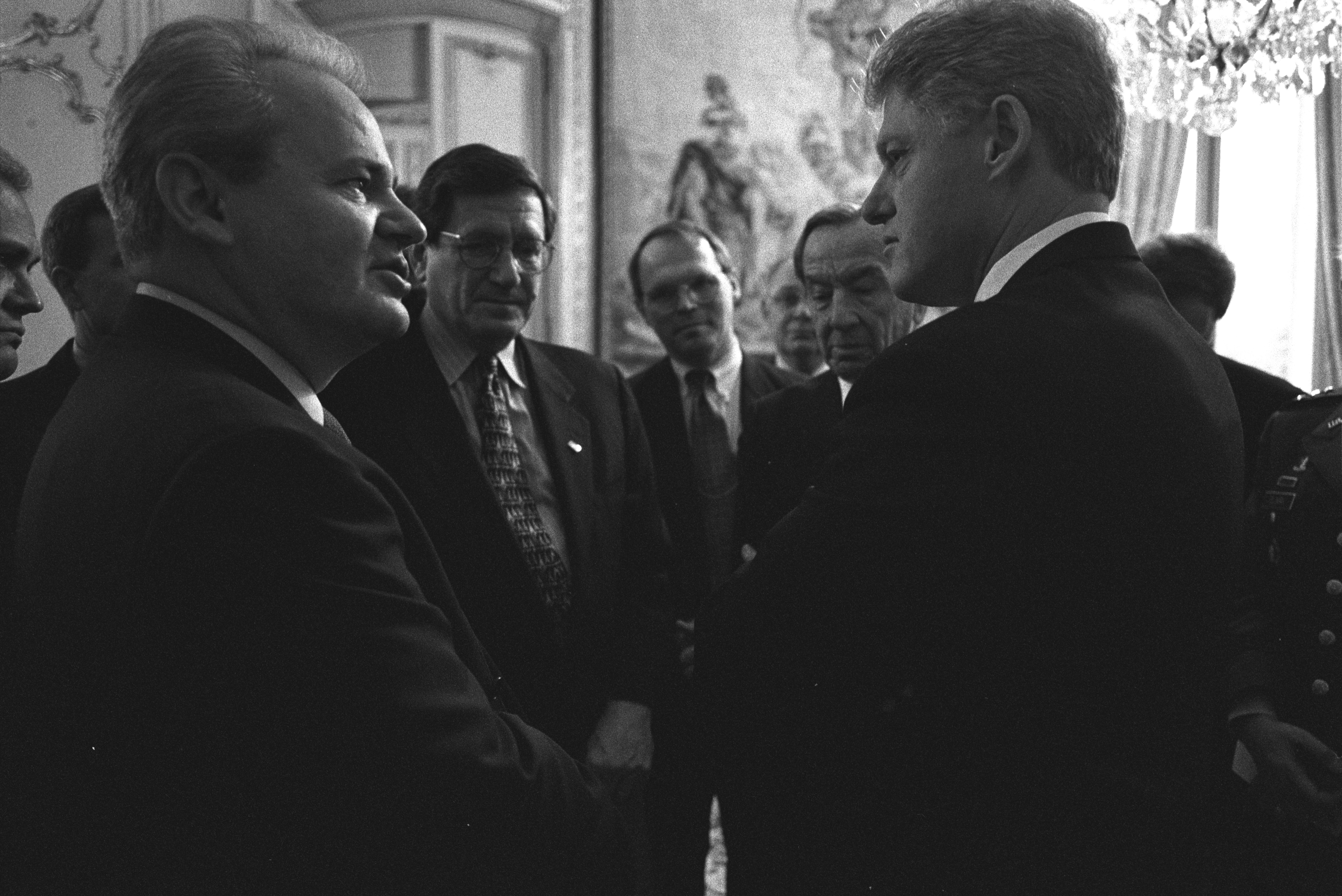
Secretary Christopher, Ambassador Richard Holbrooke and others look on as President Clinton talks with Serbian President Slobodan Milosevic

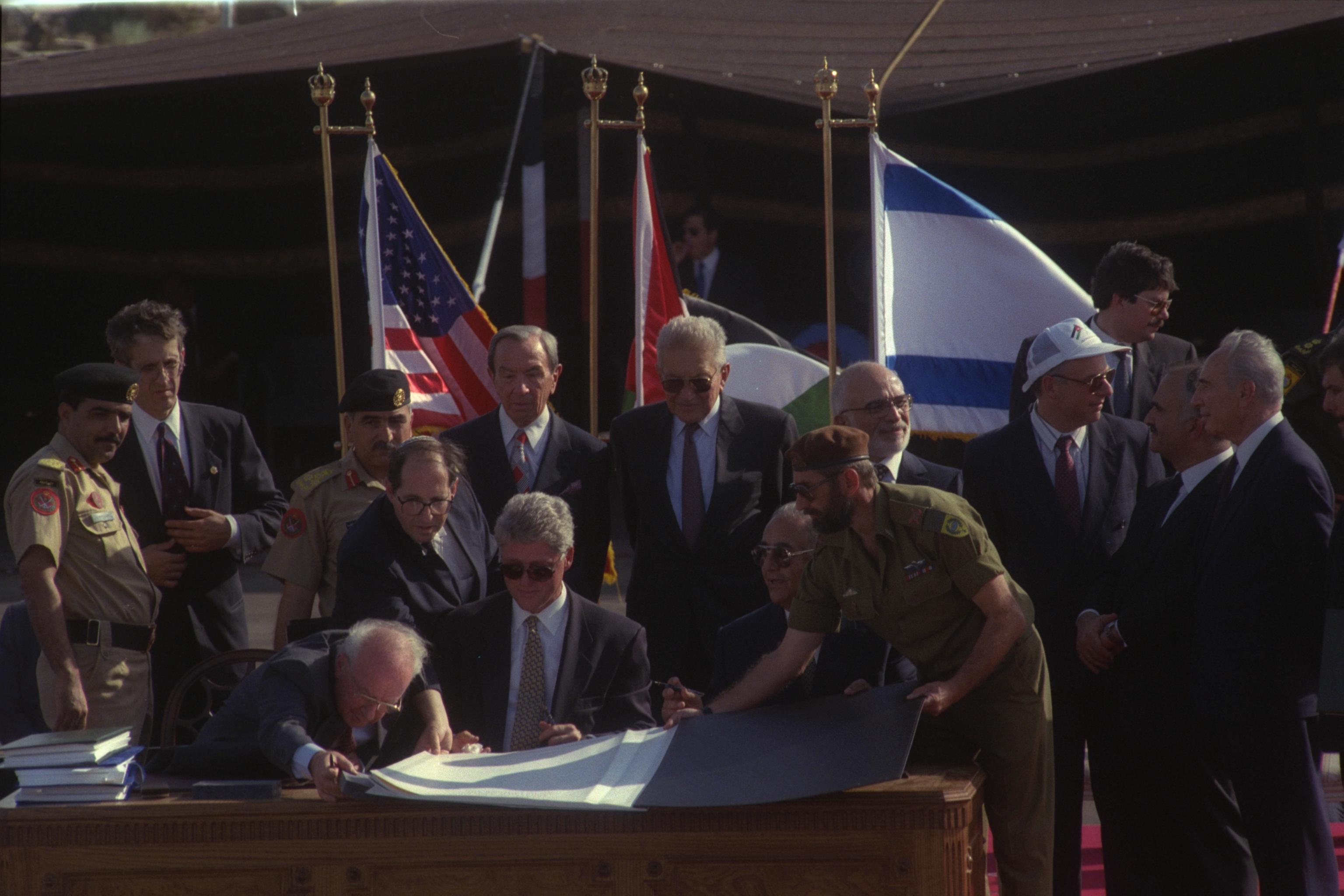
Secretary Christopher (standing, center-left) looks on as the Israel–Jordan peace treaty is signed in 1994

This is a list of international visits undertaken by Warren Christopher (in office 1993–1997) while serving as the 63rd United States secretary of state. The list includes both private travel and official state visits. The list includes only foreign travel which he made during his tenure in the position.

== Summary ==
The number of visits per country or territory where Secretary Christopher traveled are:

- One visit to Angola, Argentina, Austria, Brazil, Brunei, Cambodia, Chile, Cyprus, El Salvador, Ethiopia, Finland, FR Yugoslavia, Greece, Kazakhstan, Luxembourg, Malaysia, Mali, Norway, Poland, Portugal, Singapore, South Africa, Tanzania, Thailand, Trinidad and Tobago, Tunisia, Vatican City and Vietnam
- Two visits to Australia, Belarus, Bosnia and Herzegovina, China, Czech Republic, Haiti, Hungary, Latvia, Mexico, Morocco, Netherlands, Philippines, Spain and Turkey
- Three visits to Canada, Indonesia, Kuwait, South Korea and Lebanon
- Four visits to Ukraine
- Five visits to Italy and Saudi Arabia
- Six visits to Germany, Japan and Russia
- Seven visits to the United Kingdom
- Eight visits to France, Jordan and the Palestinian National Authority
- Ten visits to Belgium
- Eleven visits to Switzerland
- Fifteen visits to Egypt
- Twenty-nine visits to Syria
- Thirty-four visits to Israel

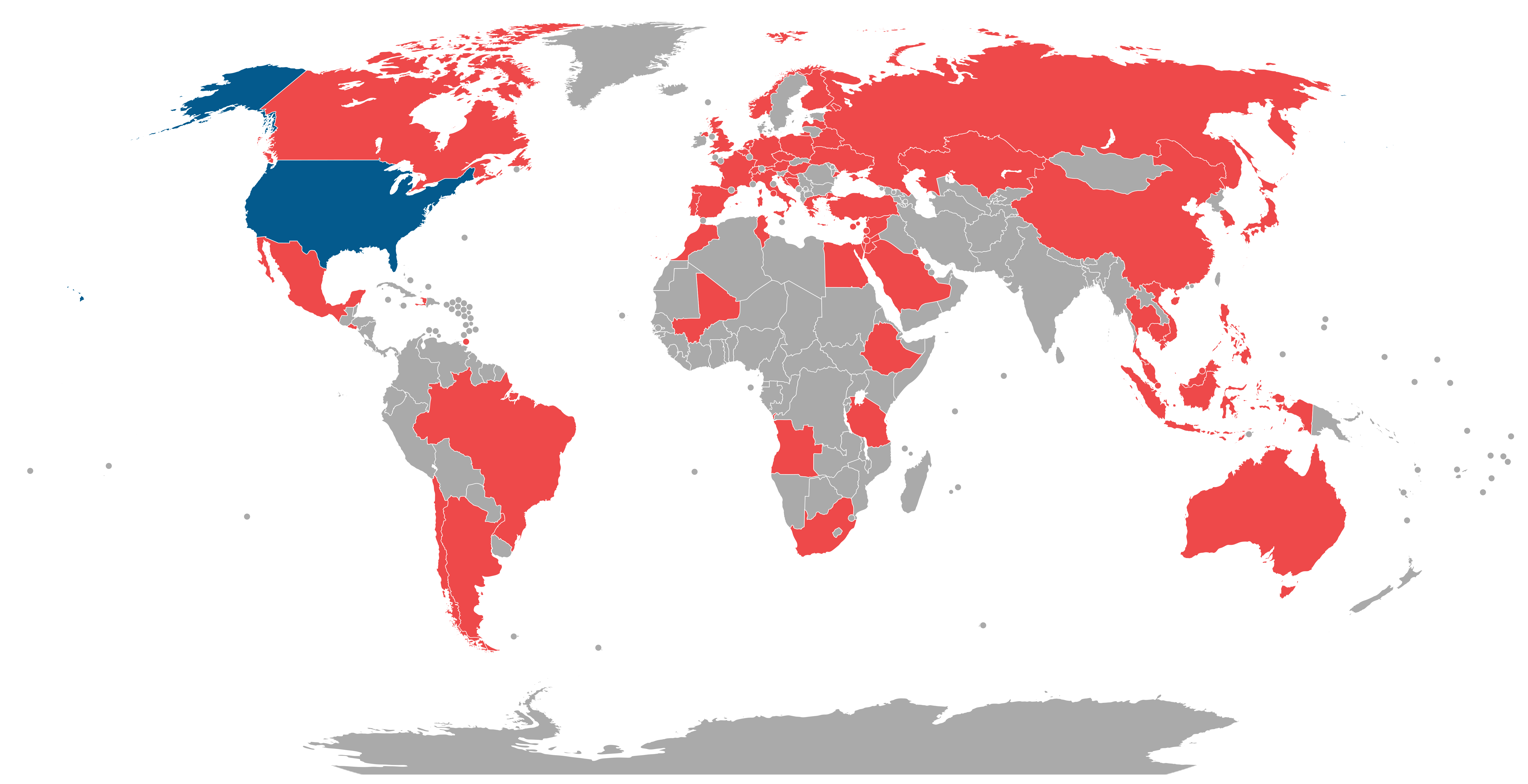
World map highlighting countries visited by Warren Christopher as Secretary of State, 1993–1997: United States Countries visited No visits

== Table ==
	Country	Locations	Details	Dates
1	Egypt	Cairo	Discussed Middle East peace process with President Mubarak and Foreign Minister Moussa.	February 18–19, 1993
1	Jordan	Amman	Discussed the Middle East peace process with King Hussein.	February 19–20, 1993
1	Syria	Damascus	Discussed the Middle East peace process with President Assad.	February 20–21, 1993
1	Saudi Arabia	Riyadh	Discussed the Middle East peace process with King Fahd.	February 21–22, 1993
1	Kuwait	Kuwait City	Discussed the Persian Gulf crisis with Sheikh al-Sabah.	February 22, 1993
1	Cyprus	Larnaca	Stopped en route to Beirut.	February 22, 1993
1	Lebanon	Beirut	Discussed the Middle East peace process with Prime Minister Hariri.	February 22, 1993
1	Israel	Jerusalem	Discussed the Middle East peace process with senior Israeli officials and Palestinian representatives.	February 22–25, 1993
1	Switzerland	Geneva	Met with Russian Foreign Minister Kozyrev.	February 25, 1993
1	Belgium	Brussels	Discussed the Yugoslav civil war with NATO Foreign Ministers.	February 25–26, 1993
2	Canada	Vancouver	Accompanied President Clinton to a summit meeting with Russian President Yeltsin.	April 2–4, 1993
3	Japan	Tokyo	Attended a meeting of the G-7 Foreign and Finance Ministers on aid to the former Soviet Union.	April 13–15, 1993
4	United Kingdom	London, Chevening	Discussed the Bosnian crisis with senior British officials and with the Foreign Ministers of Spain and Greece.	May 2–3, 1993
4	France	Paris	Discussed the Bosnian crisis with senior French officials.	May 3–4, 1993
4	Russia	Moscow	Discussed the Bosnian crisis with senior Russian officials.	May 4–5, 1993
4	Belgium	Brussels	Discussed the Bosnian crisis with NATO officials.	May 5–6, 1993
4	Germany	Bonn	Discussed the Bosnian crisis with senior German officials.	May 6–7, 1993
4	Italy	Rome	Discussed the Bosnian crisis with senior Italian officials.	May 7, 1993
5	Luxembourg	Luxembourg	Met with EC Foreign Ministers.	June 8–9, 1993
5	Greece	Athens	Attended NATO and NACC Ministerial Meetings.	June 9–12, 1993
5	Turkey	Ankara, Istanbul	Met with President Demirel and senior Turkish officials.	June 12–14, 1993
5	Austria	Vienna	Addressed World Conference on Human Rights.	June 14, 1993
6	Japan	Tokyo	Accompanied President Clinton to the Economic Summit Meeting and to meetings with Russian President Yeltsin.	July 6–10, 1993
6	South Korea	Seoul	Accompanied President Clinton.	July 10–11, 1993
7	Singapore	Singapore	Attended ASEAN Post–Ministerial Conference.	July 23–26, 1993
8	Egypt	Cairo, Alexandria	Discussed the Middle East peace process.	August 2–3, 1993
8	Israel	Jerusalem	Discussed the Middle East peace process.	August 3–4, 1993
8	Syria	Damascus	Discussed the Middle East peace process.	August 4, 1993
8	Lebanon	Zahle	Discussed the Middle East peace process.	August 4, 1993
8	Syria	Damascus	Discussed the Middle East peace process.	August 5, 1993
8	Jordan	Amman	Discussed the Middle East peace process.	August 5, 1993
8	Israel	Jerusalem	Discussed the Middle East peace process.	August 5–6, 1993
8	Syria	Damascus	Discussed the Middle East peace process.	August 6, 1993
8	Italy	Aviano	Discussed the Bosnian conflict with U.S. and NATO military officials.	August 6, 1993
9	Hungary	Budapest	Met with Foreign Minister Jeszensky and addressed the American Chamber of Commerce.	October 21, 1993
9	Russia	Moscow	Met with senior Russian officials and addressed the Academy of the National Economy.	October 21–23, 1993
9	Kazakhstan	Almaty	Met with President Nazarbayev and signed taxation and economic assistance agreements.	October 23–24, 1993
9	Ukraine	Kyiv	Met with President Kravchuk and senior Ukrainian officials.	October 24–26, 1993
9	Belarus	Minsk	Met with Chairman Shushkevich and senior officials.	October 26, 1993
9	Latvia	Riga	Met with the Foreign Ministers of the Baltic States.	October 26–27, 1993
10	Italy	Rome	Attended CSCE Conference.	November 29 – December 1, 1993
10	Belgium	Brussels	Met with EC Foreign Ministers and attended NATO and NACC Ministerial Meetings.	December 1–3, 1993
10	Israel	Tel Aviv, Jerusalem	Discussed the Middle East peace process with senior Israeli officials.	December 3–5, 1993
10	Syria	Damascus	Discussed the Middle East peace process with senior Syrian officials.	December 5–6, 1993
10	Jordan	Amman	Discussed the Middle East peace process with senior Jordanian officials and PLO Chairman Arafat	December 6, 1993
10	Israel	Jerusalem	Discussed the Middle East peace process with senior Israeli officials and Palestinian representatives.	December 6–8, 1993
10	Egypt	Cairo	Discussed the Middle East peace process with senior Egyptian officials.	December 8, 1993
10	Syria	Damascus	Discussed the Middle East peace process with senior Syrian officials.	December 9, 1993
10	Israel	Jerusalem	Discussed the Middle East peace process with senior Israeli officials.	December 9, 1993
10	Tunisia	Tunis	Discussed the Middle East peace process with PLO Chairman Arafat.	December 10, 1993
10	Morocco	Rabat	Discussed the Middle East peace process with King Hassan II.	December 10, 1993
11	Belgium	Brussels	Accompanied President Clinton to NATO Summit Meeting.	January 9–11, 1994
11	Czech Republic	Prague	Accompanied President Clinton to meetings with the Presidents of the Czech Republic, Poland, and Hungary; and with the Prime Minister of Slovakia.	January 11–12, 1994
11	Ukraine	Kyiv	Accompanied President Clinton to a meeting with President Kravchuk.	January 12, 1994
11	Russia	Moscow	Accompanied President Clinton to meetings with President Yeltsin and senior Russian officials.	January 12–15, 1994
11	Belarus	Minsk	Accompanied President Clinton to a meeting with Chairman Shushkevich.	January 15, 1994
11	Switzerland	Geneva	Accompanied President Clinton to a meeting with Syrian President Assad.	January 15–16, 1994
12	Norway	Oslo	Attended the funeral of Norwegian Foreign Minister Holst. Met with Israeli Foreign Minister Peres and PLO Chairman Arafat.	January 21–23, 1994
12	France	Paris	Met with Chinese Foreign Minister Qian and discussed the Bosnian conflict with senior French officials.	January 23–24, 1994
13	Australia	Canberra	Attended Australia–U.S. Ministerial Meeting.	March 7–9, 1994
13	Japan	Tokyo	Met with senior Japanese officials and attended a meeting of the International Committee on the Reconstruction of Cambodia.	March 9–11, 1994
13	China	Beijing	Met with senior Chinese officials.	March 11–14, 1994
13	Russia	Vladivostok	Met with Foreign Minister Kozyrev.	March 14, 1994
14	United Kingdom	London	Discussed the Bosnian conflict with the Foreign Ministers of the United Kingdom and France. Also met with King Hussein of Jordan.	April 25–26, 1994
14	Switzerland	Geneva	Met with Foreign Minister Kozyrev.	April 26–27, 1994
14	Saudi Arabia	Riyadh	Met with the Foreign Ministers of the Gulf Cooperation Council.	April 27, 1994
14	Egypt	Cairo	Met with President Mubarak, the Foreign Ministers of Egypt and Israel, and PLO Chairman Arafat.	April 27–28, 1994
14	Israel	Jerusalem	Discussed the Middle East peace process with Prime Minister Rabin.	April 28–30, 1994
14	Syria	Damascus, Palmyra	Discussed the status of the Golan Heights with President Assad and Foreign Minister Sharaa.	April 30 – May 1, 1994
14	Israel	Jerusalem	Discussed the status of the Golan Heights with Prime Minister Rabin.	May 1–3, 1994
14	Egypt	Cairo	Attended the signing of the agreement to implement the Israel–Palestinian Declaration of Principles, and discussed the Bosnian conflict with Russian Foreign Minister Kozyrev.	May 3–4, 1994
15	Mexico	Mexico City	Attended meeting of the U.S.–Mexico Binational Commission.	May 8–9, 1994
16	Switzerland	Geneva	Attended conference of European Union Foreign Ministers on the Bosnian conflict.	May 13–15, 1994
16	Syria	Damascus	Discussed the future status of the Golan Heights with President Assad.	May 15–16, 1994
16	Israel	Jerusalem	Discussed the future status of the Golan Heights with Prime Minister Rabin.	May 16–18, 1994
16	Palestinian National Authority	Jericho	Met with members of the Governing Council.	May 17, 1994
16	Syria	Damascus	Discussed the future status of the Golan Heights with President Assad.	May 18, 1994
16	Egypt	Cairo	Discussed the Israel–Syrian peace process with President Mubarak.	May 18–19, 1994
17	Vatican City State	Vatican City	Accompanied President Clinton to Vatican City for meetings with senior church officials.	June 2, 1994
17	Italy	Rome, Nettuno	Accompanied President Clinton to meetings with Prime Minister Berlusconi, President Scalfaro, and senior Italian officials.	June 2–4, 1994
17	United Kingdom	Cambridge, London, Portsmouth	Accompanied President Clinton to meeting with Prime Minister Major and to D-Day commemorative ceremonies.	June 4–5, 1994
17	France	Caen, Colleville, Paris	Accompanied President Clinton to D-Day memorial ceremonies and to meetings with President Mitterrand and senior French officials. Addressed CSCE ministerial meeting.	June 6–8, 1994
17	Turkey	Istanbul	Attended NATO and NACC Ministerial Meetings.	June 8–10, 1994
18	Belgium	Brussels	Attended NATO Ministerial Meeting and met with Russian Foreign Minister Kozyrev.	June 22, 1994
19	United Kingdom	London	Private visit to London.	July 1–5, 1994
19	Switzerland	Geneva	Attended ministerial meeting of the Contact Group on Bosnia.	July 5, 1994
19	Latvia	Riga	Accompanied President Clinton to a meeting with the Presidents of the Baltic States.	July 6, 1994
19	Poland	Warsaw	Accompanied President Clinton.	July 6, 1994
19	Italy	Naples	Accompanied President Clinton to the G-7 Economic Summit and to meetings with Russian President Yeltsin.	July 7–11, 1994
19	Germany	Bonn, Berlin	Accompanied President Clinton to meetings with Chancellor Kohl and EU President Delors.	July 11–12, 1994
20	Israel	Jerusalem	Discussed the Middle East peace process with Prime Minister Rabin and Foreign Minister Peres.	July 18–19, 1994
20	Syria	Damascus	Discussed the Middle East peace process with President Assad and Foreign Minister Sharaa	July 19–20, 1994
20	Jordan	Amman, Petra	Attended U.S.–Jordan–Israel Trilateral Economic Committee meeting.	July 20–21, 1994
20	Palestinian National Authority	Gaza Strip	Met with PLO Chairman Arafat.	July 21, 1994
20	Israel	Tel Aviv, Jerusalem	Discussed the Middle East peace process with Prime Minister Rabin.	July 21–22, 1994
20	Syria	Damascus	Discussed the Middle East peace process with President Assad.	July 22, 1994
21	Switzerland	Geneva	Attended a meeting of Contact Group Foreign Ministers about the Bosnian conflict.	July 30, 1994
22	Egypt	Alexandria	Discussed the Middle East Peace Process with President Mubarak and PLO Chairman Arafat.	August 6, 1994
22	Israel	Jerusalem	Discussed the Middle East peace process with Prime Minister Rabin and Foreign Minister Peres	August 6–7, 1994
22	Syria	Damascus	Discussed the Middle East peace process with President Assad and Foreign Minister Sharaa.	August 7–8, 1994
22	Jordan	Aqaba, Amman	Attended inauguration of the Jordan–Israel Border Crossing, and discussed the Middle East peace process with King Hussein.	August 8, 1994
22	Israel	Jerusalem	Discussed the Middle East peace process with Prime Minister Rabin and Foreign Minister Peres.	August 8–9, 1994
23	Belgium	Brussels	Attended memorial service for NATO Secretary General Wörner.	August 17–19, 1994
24	Germany	Berlin	Attended farewell ceremony for departing Allied troops.	September 8–9, 1994
25	Israel	Jerusalem	Discussed the Middle East peace process with senior Israeli officials.	October 9–11, 1994
25	Syria	Damascus	Discussed the Middle East peace process with senior Syrian officials.	October 11, 1994
25	Jordan	Amman	Discussed the Middle East peace process with senior Jordanian officials.	October 11–12, 1994
25	Kuwait	Kuwait City, Camp Doha	Met with the Foreign Ministers of the Gulf Cooperation Council and the United Kingdom. Addressed U.S. military personnel.	October 12, 1994
25	Israel	Tel Aviv, Jerusalem	Discussed the Middle East peace process with senior Israeli officials.	October 12–13, 1994
25	Syria	Damascus	Discussed the Middle East peace process with senior Syrian officials.	October 13–14, 1994
25	Egypt	Cairo	Discussed the Middle East peace process with President Mubarak and PLO Chairman Arafat.	October 14, 1994
25	Germany	Frankfurt am Main	Commented to the press on the Middle East peace process and the Iraq–Kuwait crisis.	October 14, 1994
25	Haiti	Port-au-Prince	Attended the return of President Aristide.	October 15, 1994
26	Egypt	Cairo	Accompanied President Clinton to meetings with President Mubarak and PLO Chairman Arafat.	October 25–26, 1994
26	Jordan	Aqaba, Wadi Arava, Amman	Accompanied President Clinton to the signing of the Israel–Jordan peace treaty and to meetings with senior Jordanian officials.	October 26–27, 1994
26	Syria	Damascus	Accompanied President Clinton to a meeting with President Assad.	October 27, 1994
26	Israel	Jerusalem	Accompanied President Clinton to meetings with senior Israeli officials.	October 27–28, 1994
26	Kuwait	Kuwait City	Accompanied President Clinton to a meeting with the Amir of Kuwait.	October 28, 1994
26	Saudi Arabia	King Khalid Military City, Riyadh	Accompanied President Clinton to a meeting with King Fahd.	October 28–29, 1994
26	Morocco	Casablanca	Attended Middle East and North Africa Economic Summit Conference.	October 30 – November 1, 1994
27	South Korea	Seoul, Osan	Discussed the security situation on the Korean Peninsula with senior Korean officials, addressed Korean–American Friendship Society and U.S. military personnel.	November 8–10, 1994
27	Indonesia	Jakarta	Attended APEC Ministerial Meeting.	November 10–12, 1994
27	Philippines	Manila	Accompanied President Clinton during a State Visit.	November 12–13, 1994
27	Indonesia	Jakarta, Bogor	Attended APEC Summit Meeting.	November 13–16, 1994
27	Thailand	Bangkok	Met with senior Thai officials.	November 16–17, 1994
28	Belgium	Brussels	Attended NATO, NACC, and Contact Group Ministerial Meetings.	December 1–4, 1994
28	Hungary	Budapest	Attended CSCE Summit Meeting.	December 4–6, 1994
28	Syria	Damascus	Discussed the Middle East peace process with President Assad.	December 6, 1994
28	Israel	Jerusalem	Discussed the Middle East peace process with Prime Minister Rabin.	December 6–7, 1994
28	Palestinian National Authority	Gaza Strip	Discussed the Middle East peace process with Chairman Arafat.	December 7, 1994
29	Switzerland	Geneva	Met with Russian Foreign Minister Kozyrev.	January 17–18, 1995
30	Canada	Ottawa	Accompanied President Clinton on a state visit.	February 23–24, 1995
31	Egypt	Cairo	Discussed the Middle East peace process with senior Egyptian officials.	March 8–9, 1995
31	Israel	Jerusalem	Discussed the Middle East peace process with senior Israeli officials.	March 9–12, 1995
31	Palestinian National Authority	Gaza Strip	Discussed the Middle East peace process with Chairman Arafat.	March 10, 1995
31	Saudi Arabia	Jeddah	Met with the Gulf Cooperation Council Foreign Ministers and discussed the situation in Iraq with King Fahd.	March 12, 1995
31	Syria	Damascus	Discussed the Middle East peace process with President Assad	March 12–13, 1995
31	Jordan	Amman	Discussed the Middle East peace process with King Hussein.	March 13, 1995
31	Israel	Jerusalem	Discussed the Middle East peace process with senior Israeli officials.	March 13–14, 1995
31	Syria	Damascus	Discussed the Middle East peace process with President Assad	March 14–15, 1995
32	France	Paris	Met with French Foreign Minister Juppé.	March 21–22, 1995
32	Switzerland	Geneva	Met with Russian Foreign Minister Kozyrev.	March 22–23, 1995
33	Russia	Moscow	Accompanied President Clinton to summit meeting.	May 9–11, 1995
33	Ukraine	Kyiv	Accompanied President Clinton on state visit.	May 11–12, 1995
34	Netherlands	The Hague, Noordwijk	Attended a meeting of the Contact Group Foreign Ministers and NATO and NACC Ministerial Meetings.	May 29 – June 1, 1995
34	Portugal	Lisbon	Signed Agreement on Cooperation and Defense.	June 1, 1995
34	Spain	Madrid	Met with senior Spanish officials.	June 1–2, 1995
35	Haiti	Montrouis	Attended an OAS ministerial meeting and the inauguration of a new Haitian police force.	June 4, 1995
36	Israel	Tel Aviv, Jerusalem	Discussed the Israel–Syrian peace process with Prime Minister Rabin and Foreign Minister Peres.	June 8–9, 1995
36	Egypt	Cairo	Met with President Mubarak and Israeli Prime Minister Rabin.	June 9–10, 1995
36	Syria	Damascus	Discussed the Israel–Syrian peace process with President Assad.	June 10, 1995
36	Israel	Jerusalem	Discussed the Israel–Syrian peace process with Prime Minister Rabin	June 10–11, 1995
36	Palestinian National Authority	Jericho	Met with PLO Chairman Arafat.	June 11, 1995
36	Jordan	Amman	Discussed the Middle East peace process with King Hussein.	June 11, 1995
37	Canada	Halifax	Attended the G-7 Economic Summit.	June 15–17, 1995
38	United Kingdom	London	Discussed the Bosnian conflict with NATO and Contact Group representatives.	July 20–22, 1995
39	Brunei	Bandar Seri Begawan	Met with the Foreign Ministers of China and Russia and attended ASEAN Post–Ministerial Conference.	July 31 – August 3, 1995
39	Malaysia	Kuala Lumpur	Discussed the Bosnian conflect with Prime Minister Mahathir; signed commercial and educational exchange agreements.	August 3–4, 1995
39	Cambodia	Phnom Penh	Met with King Sihanouk and senior Cambodian officials. Signed AID and OPIC agreements.	August 4–5, 1995
39	Vietnam	Hanoi	Signed agreements normalizing relations with Vietnam and opened the U.S. Embassy.	August 5–7, 1995
40	Jordan	Amman	Attended the opening session of the Middle East and North Africa Economic Summit.	October 29–30, 1995
40	Syria	Damascus	Discussed the Israel–Syrian peace process with President Assad.	October 30, 1995
41	Israel	Jerusalem	Accompanied President Clinton to the funeral of Prime Minister Rabin.	November 5–6, 1995
42	Japan	Osaka	Attended APEC Ministerial Meeting.	November 16–17, 1995
43	Spain	Madrid	Attended European Union Summit Meeting.	December 2–4, 1995
43	Belgium	Brussels	Attended NATO and NACC Ministerial Meetings.	December 4–6, 1995
44	France	Paris	Attended the signing of the Bosnian Peace Treaty.	December 14, 1995
44	Syria	Damascus	Discussed the Israel–Syrian peace process.	December 14–15, 1995
44	Israel	Jerusalem	Discussed the Israel–Syrian peace process.	December 15–17, 1995
44	Jordan	Aqaba	Discussed the Middle East peace process with King Hussein.	December 16, 1995
44	Palestinian National Authority	Jericho	Discussed the Middle East peace process with Chairman Arafat.	December 16, 1995
45	Israel	Jerusalem	Discussed the Israel–Syrian peace process with senior Israeli officials and King Hussein of Jordan.	January 10–11, 1996
45	Syria	Damascus	Discussed the Israel–Syrian peace process with President Assad.	January 11–13, 1996
45	Palestinian National Authority	Gaza Strip	Discussed the Middle East peace process with Chairman Arafat.	January 13, 1996
46	Croatia	Zagreb	Met with President Tuđman.	February 2–3, 1996
46	Bosnia and Herzegovina	Tuzla	Visited U.S. troops and met with President Izetbegović.	February 3, 1996
46	FR Yugoslavia	Belgrade	Met with President Milošević.	February 4, 1996
46	Israel	Jerusalem	Discussed the Israel–Syria peace process with Prime Minister Peres.	February 5–7, 1996
46	Syria	Damascus	Discussed the Israel–Syria peace process with President Assad.	February 6, 1996
46	Palestinian National Authority	Gaza Strip	Met with Chairman Arafat.	February 7, 1996
46	Finland	Helsinki	Met with Russian Foreign Minister Yevgeny Primakov and Ukrainian President Kuchma.	February 8–11, 1996
47	El Salvador	San Salvador	Address the Legislative Assembly and met with the Presidents of El Salvador, Honduras, and Costa Rica, the Prime Minister of Belize, and the Vice President of Nicaragua.	February 26–27, 1996
47	Chile	Santiago de Chile	Met with President Frei and Foreign Minister Insulza.	February 27–28, 1996
47	Argentina	Buenos Aires	Met with President Menem and Foreign Minister Di Tella. Signed agreement on space cooperation.	February 28 – March 1, 1996
47	Brazil	São Paulo, Brasília, Manaus	Met with President Cardoso and Foreign Minister Lampreia. Signed agreement on peaceful uses of atomic energy, visited National Institute of Amazonian Research.	March 1–3, 1996
47	Trinidad and Tobago	Port of Spain	Signed extradition and legal assistance treaties.	March 3–4, 1996
48	Egypt	Sharm el-Sheikh	Accompanied President Clinton to the Summit of the Peacemakers.	March 13, 1996
48	Israel	Jerusalem, Tel Aviv	Accompanied President Clinton and held further discussions with Israeli officials on cooperation against terrorism.	March 13–16, 1996
48	Belgium	Brussels	Discussed the situation in Bosnia with senior NATO officials.	March 16, 1996
48	Switzerland	Geneva	Attended meeting with the Presidents of Serbia and Croatia, and the Acting President of Bosnia; and addressed the Conference on Disarmament.	March 17–18, 1996
48	Ukraine	Kyiv	Met with President Kuchma and Foreign Minister Udovenko.	March 18–19, 1996
48	Czech Republic	Prague	Attended a meeting of Central and Eastern European Foreign Ministers.	March 19–21, 1996
48	Russia	Moscow	Met with President Yeltsin and Foreign Minister Primakov and attended a meeting of Contact Group Foreign Ministers.	March 21–23, 1996
49	South Korea	Cheju Island	Accompanied President Clinton to a meeting with President Kim.	April 15–16, 1996
49	Japan	Tokyo	Accompanied President Clinton on a State Visit.	April 16–18, 1996
49	Netherlands	The Hague	Met with Foreign Minister Van Mierlo and Chinese Foreign Minister Qian.	April 18–20, 1996
49	Syria	Damascus	Attempted to resolve the Israeli–Lebanese conflict.	April 20–21, 1996
49	Israel	Jerusalem	Attempted to resolve the Israeli–Lebanese conflict.	April 21, 1996
49	Syria	Damascus	Attempted to resolve the Israeli–Lebanese conflict.	April 21–22, 1996
49	Israel	Jerusalem	Attempted to resolve the Israeli–Lebanese conflict.	April 22–23, 1996
49	Syria	Damascus	Attempted to resolve the Israeli–Lebanese conflict.	April 23, 1996
49	Israel	Jerusalem	Attempted to resolve the Israeli–Lebanese conflict.	April 23–24, 1996
49	Syria	Damascus	Attempted to resolve the Israeli–Lebanese conflict.	April 24, 1996
49	Lebanon	Shtora	Met with Prime Minister Hariri and Speaker Berri; attempted to resolve the Israel–Lebanon conflict.	April 24, 1996
49	Israel	Jerusalem	Attempted to resolve the Israeli–Lebanese conflict.	April 25, 1996
49	Syria	Damascus	Attempted to resolve the Israeli–Lebanese conflict. Also met with Lebanese Prime Minister Hariri and Speaker Berri.	April 25, 1996
49	Israel	Jerusalem	Attempted to resolve the Israeli–Lebanese conflict.	April 25–26, 1996
49	Syria	Damascus	Attempted to resolve the Israeli–Lebanese conflict.	April 26, 1996
49	Israel	Jerusalem	Announced Israel–Lebanon cease-fire agreement.	April 26, 1996
50	Mexico	Mexico City	Attended meeting of the U.S.–Mexico Binational Commission.	May 6–7, 1996
51	Switzerland	Geneva	Discussed implementation of the Dayton Accords with the Presidents of Bosnia, Croatia, and Serbia, and with representatives of IFOR and OSCE.	June 2–3, 1996
51	Germany	Berlin	Attended meetings of NATO, NACC, and Contact Group Foreign Ministers.	June 3–4, 1996
52	Israel	Jerusalem	Met with Prime Minister Netanyahu and Foreign Minister Levy.	June 25–26, 1996
52	Egypt	Cairo	Met with President Mubarak and Chairman Arafat.	June 26, 1996
52	Saudi Arabia	Dhahran	Met with Foreign Minister Prince Saud and with U.S. and Saudi military personnel.	June 26, 1996
52	France	Lyon	Attended the G-7 Economic Summit Meeting.	June 26–29, 1996
53	Indonesia	Jakarta	Ministerial Conference. Met with the Indonesian Human Rights Commission and with Russian Foreign Minister Primakov.	July 23–25, 1996
53	Australia	Sydney	Attended Australia–U.S. Ministerial talks.	July 25–27, 1996
54	Belgium	Brussels	Discussed implementation of the Dayton Accords with senior NATO and OSCE officials.	August 13, 1996
54	Switzerland	Geneva	Met with the Presidents of Bosnia, Croatia, and Serbia.	August 13–15, 1996
54	Bosnia and Herzegovina	Sarajevo	Met with President Izetbegović and five political leaders to discuss national elections.	August 15, 1996
55	United Kingdom	London	Discussed the Northern Iraq and Bosnian crises with Prime Minister Major and Foreign Secretary Rifkind.	September 5–6, 1996
55	France	Paris	Discussed the Northern Iraq and Bosnian crises with President Chirac and Foreign Minister de Charette.	September 5, 1996
55	Germany	Stuttgart, Bonn	Met with Foreign Minister Kinkel and delivered a commemorative address.	September 6–7, 1996
55	United Kingdom	London	Met with Israeli Foreign Minister Levy.	September 7–8, 1996
56	Israel	Jerusalem	Discussed the Israeli–Palestinian conflict with Prime Minister Netanyahu.	October 6–7, 1996
56	Palestinian National Authority	Gaza Strip	Discussed the Israeli–Palestinian conflict with PLO Chairman Arafat.	October 6, 1996
56	Mali	Bamako	Met with President Konaré and Foreign Minister Traoré.	October 7–9, 1996
56	Ethiopia	Addis Ababa	Met with Prime Minister Zenawi and discussed plans for an African crisis-response force with OAU officials.	October 9–11, 1996
56	Tanzania	Arusha	Discussed the Burundi crisis with the Presidents of Tanzania, Kenya, and Uganda. Also met with the Chief Prosecutor of the International War Crimes Tribunall.	October 11–12, 1996
56	South Africa	Cape Town, Johannesburg, Pretoria	Met with President Mandela and delivered an address at the University of the Witwatersrand.	October 12–14, 1996
56	Angola	Luanda	Met with President dos Santos and visited UN military observers.	October 14, 1996
57	Egypt	Cairo	Attended Middle East and North Africa Economic Conference.	November 12, 1996
57	France	Paris	Attended a meeting of the Steering Board of the Bosnian Peace Implementation Council.	November 12–14, 1996
57	Japan	Sapporo	Overnight stop while en route to China.	November 18, 1996
57	China	Beijing, Shanghai	Met with senior Chinese officials and made a speech at Fudan University.	November 19–21, 1996
57	Philippines	Manila	Attended APEC Ministerial Meeting.	November 21–24, 1996
58	Belgium	Brussels	Attended NATO Ministerial Meeting.	December 9–11, 1996
