= 21st G7 summit =

1995 international leader meeting in Canada

- Official logo
- Host country: Canada
- Dates: June 15–17, 1995
- Cities: Halifax
- Venues: Summit Place
- Follows: 20th G7 summit
- Precedes: 22nd G7 summit

The 21st G7 summit was held on June 15–17, 1995 in Halifax, Nova Scotia, Canada. The venue for this summit meeting was Summit Place in Halifax. It was labelled by Prime Minister Jean Chrétien as a "Chevrolet Summit", using a utilitarian automobile as a metaphor for the summit being less expensive than previous summits in Versailles and Venice.

The Group of Seven (G7) is an unofficial forum which brought together the heads of the richest industrialized countries: France, Germany, Italy, Japan, the United Kingdom, the United States, Canada (since 1976), and the President of the European Commission (starting officially in 1981). The summits were not meant to be linked formally with wider international institutions; and in fact, a mild rebellion against the stiff formality of other international meetings was a part of the genesis of cooperation between France's president Valéry Giscard d'Estaing and West Germany's chancellor Helmut Schmidt as they conceived the first Group of Six (G6) summit in 1975.

== Leaders at the summit ==
The G7 is an unofficial annual forum for the leaders of Canada, the European Commission, France, Germany, Italy, Japan, the United Kingdom, and the United States. Boris Yeltsin was also in attendance representing Russia.

The 21st G7 summit was the first summit for French President Jacques Chirac and the last summit for Japanese Prime Minister Tomiichi Murayama. It was also the first and only summit for Italian Prime Minister Lamberto Dini.

=== Participants ===
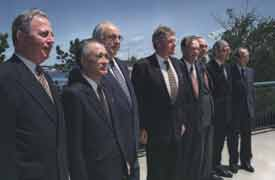
Leaders of the G7 posing for the family photograph in Halifax Regional Municipality, Nova Scotia Province, June 16, 1995

These summit participants are the current "core members" of the international forum:

**Core G7 members** Host state and leader are shown in bold text.
Member		Represented by	Title
(Canada)	**Canada**	**Jean Chrétien**	**Prime Minister**
(France)	France	Jacques Chirac	President
(Germany)	Germany	Helmut Kohl	Chancellor
(Italy)	Italy	Lamberto Dini	Prime Minister
(Japan)	Japan	Tomiichi Murayama	Prime Minister
(United Kingdom)	United Kingdom	John Major	Prime Minister
(United States)	United States	Bill Clinton	President
(European Union)	European Union	Jacques Santer	Commission President
(European Union)	European Union	Jacques Chirac	Council President

== Issues ==
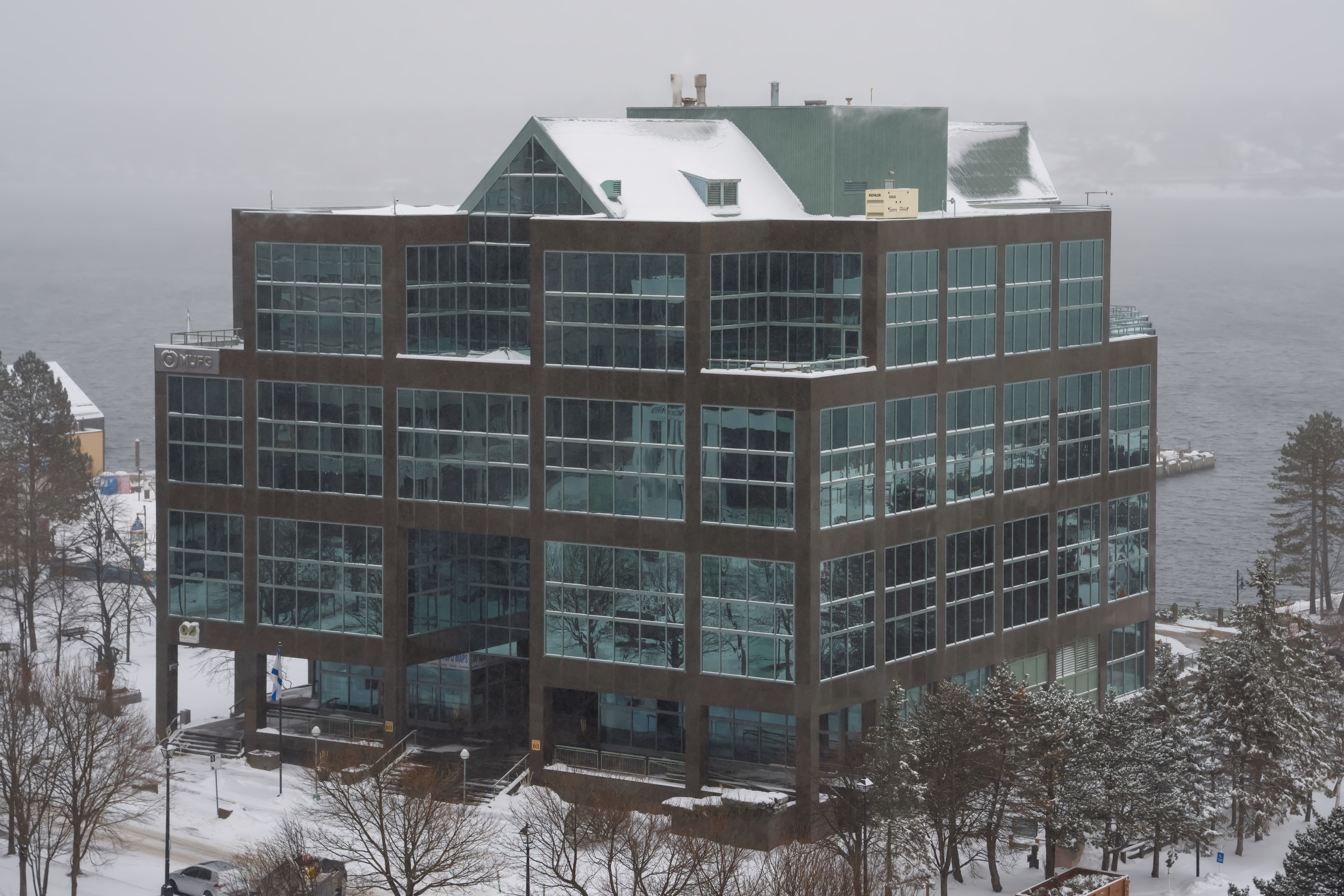
Summit Place, the host building

The summit was intended as a venue for resolving differences among its members. As a practical matter, the summit was also conceived as an opportunity for its members to give each other mutual encouragement in the face of difficult economic decisions. Issues which were discussed at this summit included:

- Growth and Employment
- Meeting the Challenges of the 21st Century
- Strengthening the Global Economy
- Promoting Sustainable Development
- Reducing Poverty
- Safeguarding the Environment
- Preventing and Responding to Crises
- Reinforcing Coherence, Effectiveness and Efficiency of Institutions
- Creating Opportunities through Open Markets
- Economies in Transition
- Nuclear Safety

== Accomplishments ==
This was the first year that the G8 summit was marked by an official World Wide Web site on the Internet sponsored by the Canadian Government. Two unofficial web pages were also created, one set up by Dalhousie University in Halifax, the summit site, and the other created by teachers and students of Cornwallis Junior High School there.

== Gallery of participating leaders ==
=== Core G7 participants ===
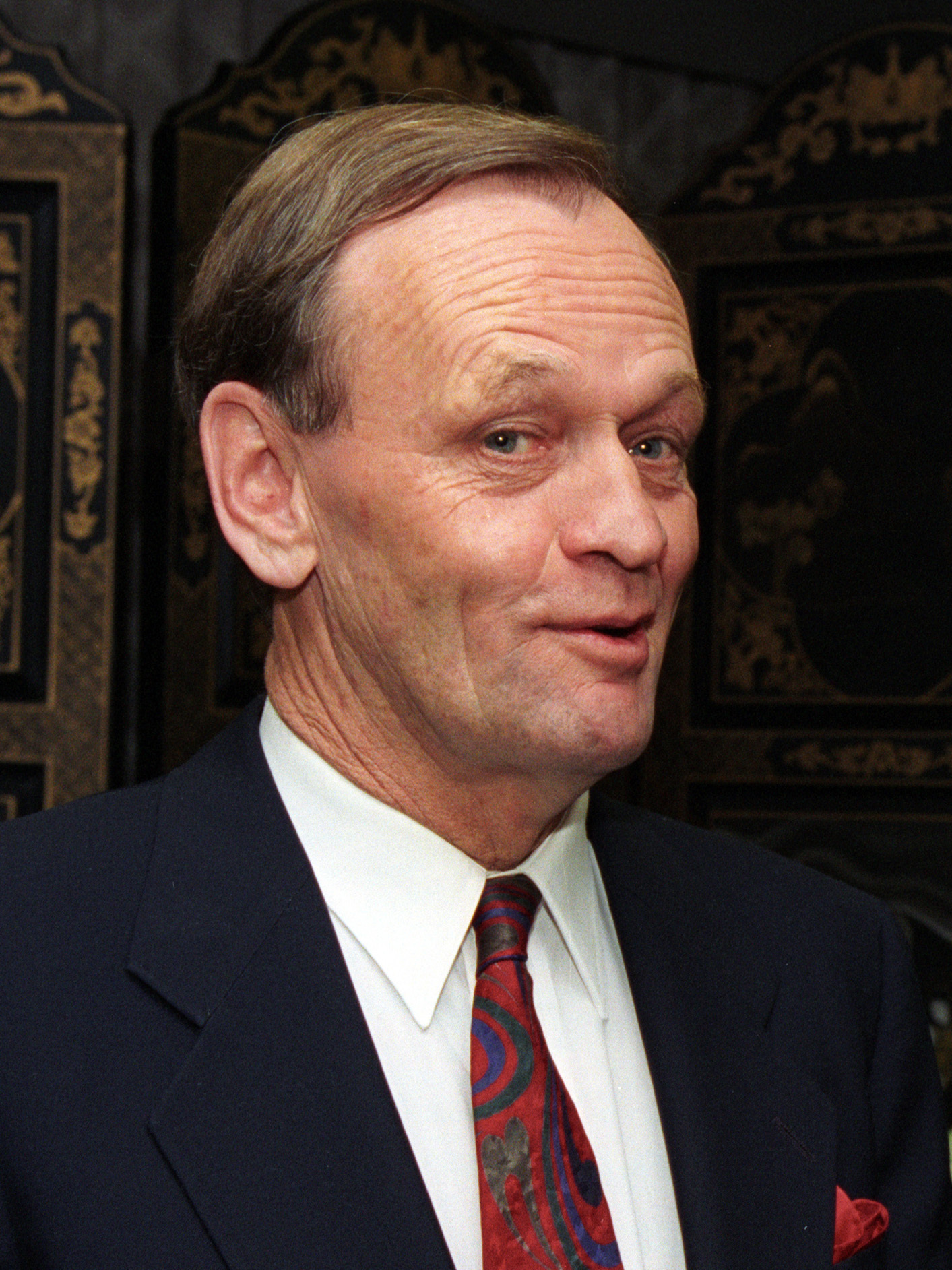
(Canada) Canada
Jean Chrétien,
Prime Minister (Host)

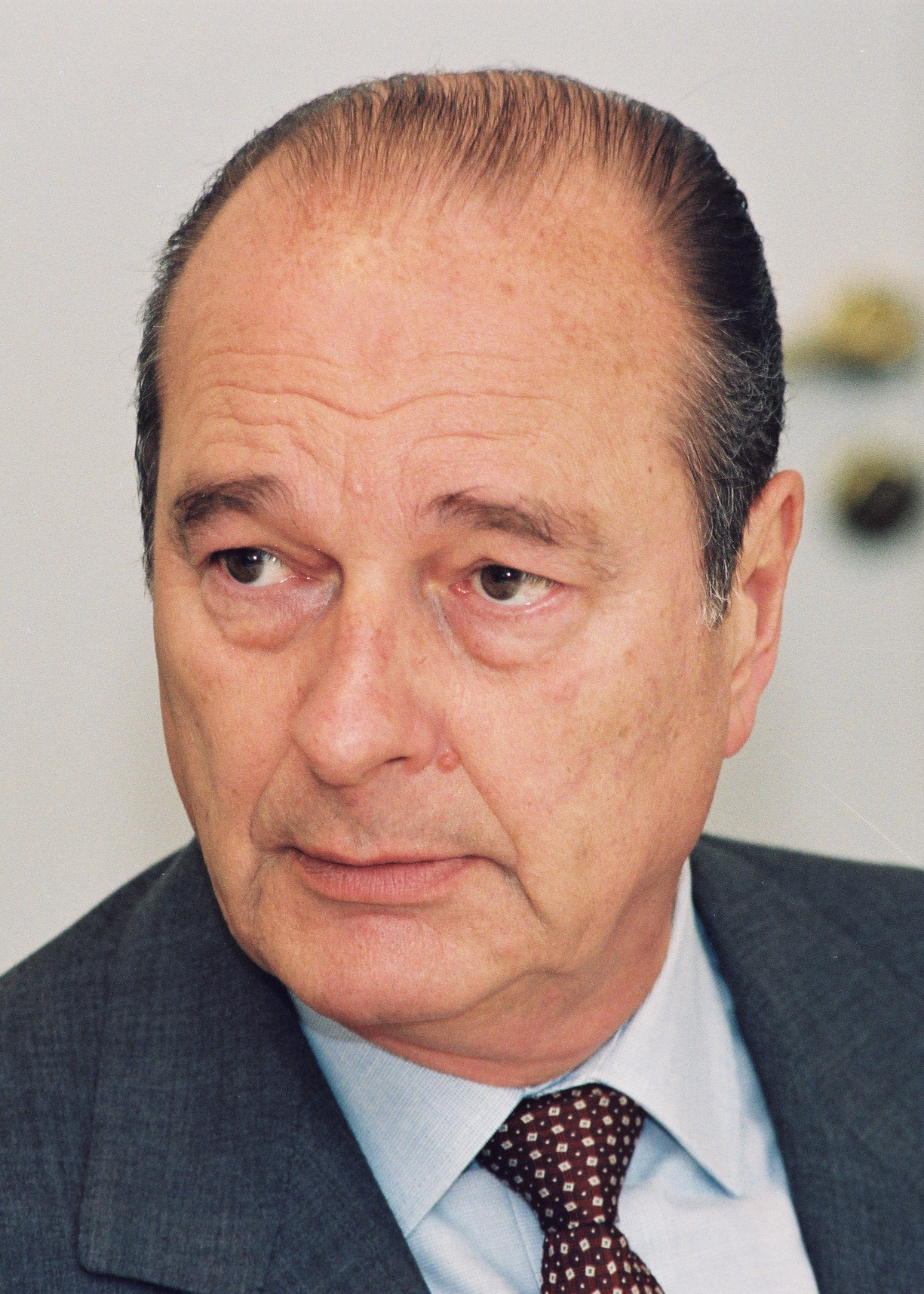
(France) France
Jacques Chirac,
President

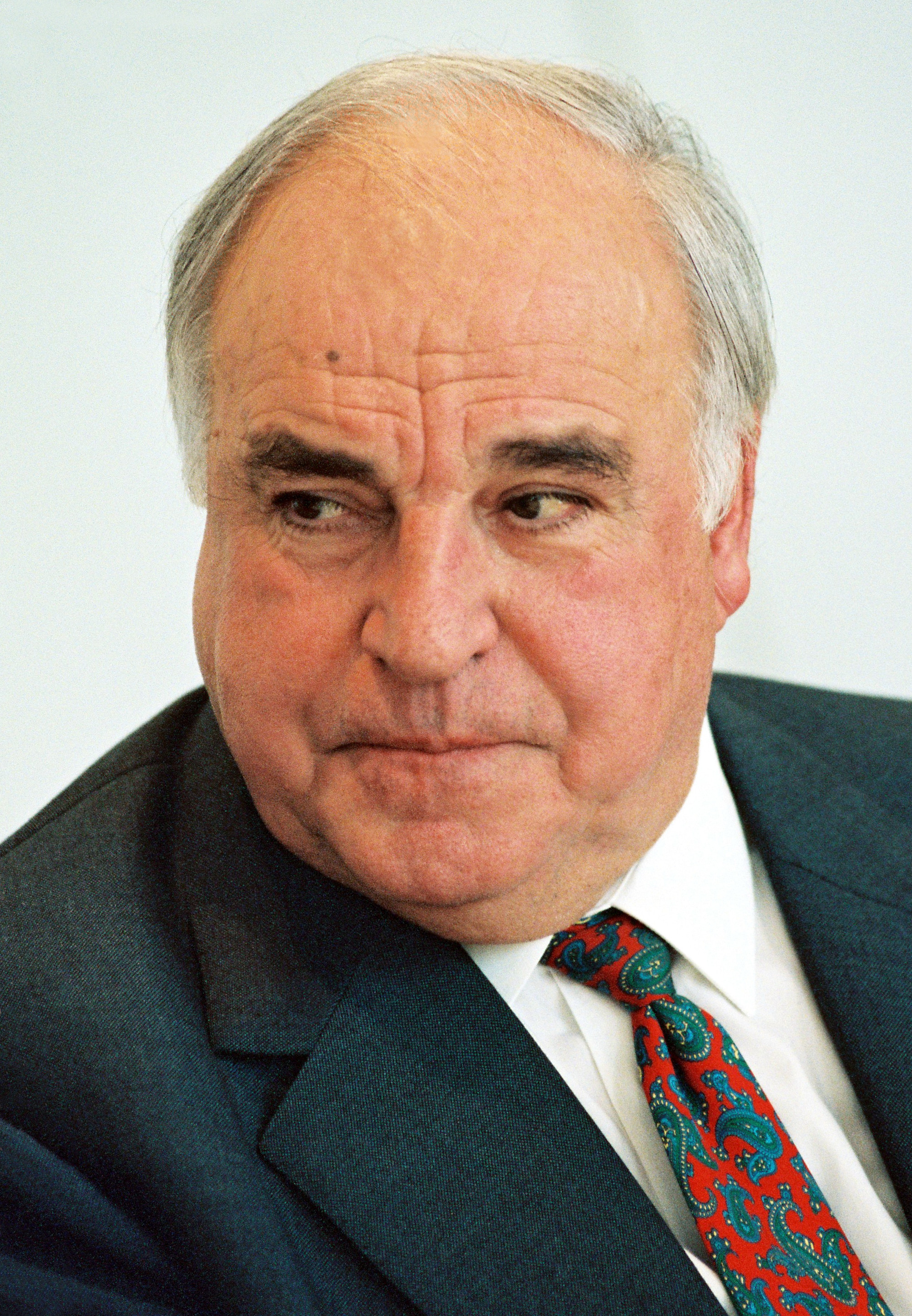
(Germany) Germany
Helmut Kohl,
Chancellor

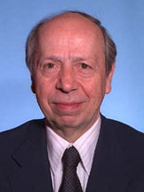
(Italy) Italy
Lamberto Dini,
Prime Minister

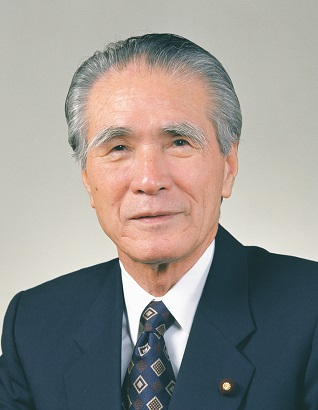
(Japan) Japan
Tomiichi Murayama,
Prime Minister

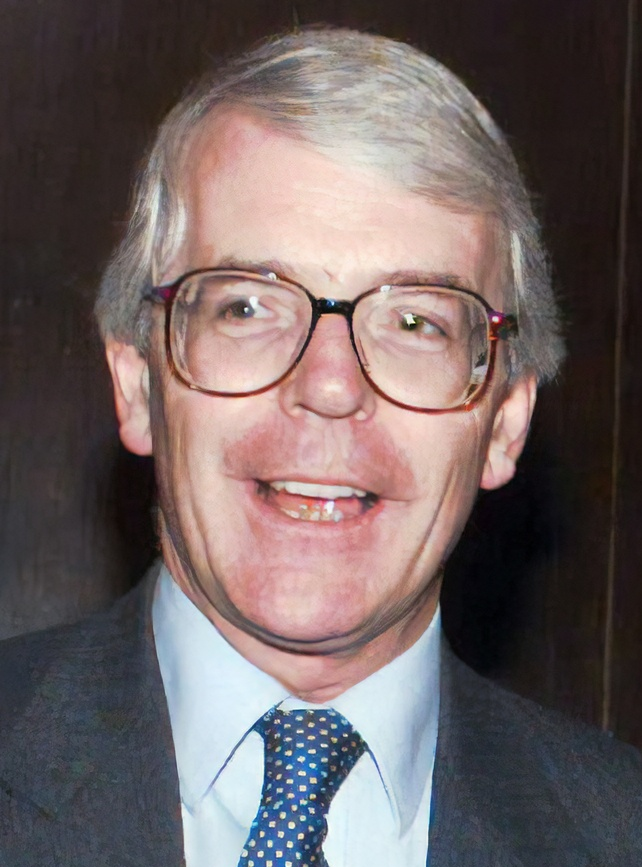
(United Kingdom) United Kingdom
John Major,
Prime Minister

(United States) United States
Bill Clinton,
President

== See also ==
- G8
