= 22nd G7 summit =

1996 international leader meeting in France

Coordinates: 45.7842°N 4.8524°E

- Official logo
- Host country: France
- Dates: 27–29 June 1996
- Cities: Lyon
- Venues: Musée d'art contemporain
- Follows: 21st G7 summit
- Precedes: 23rd G8 summit

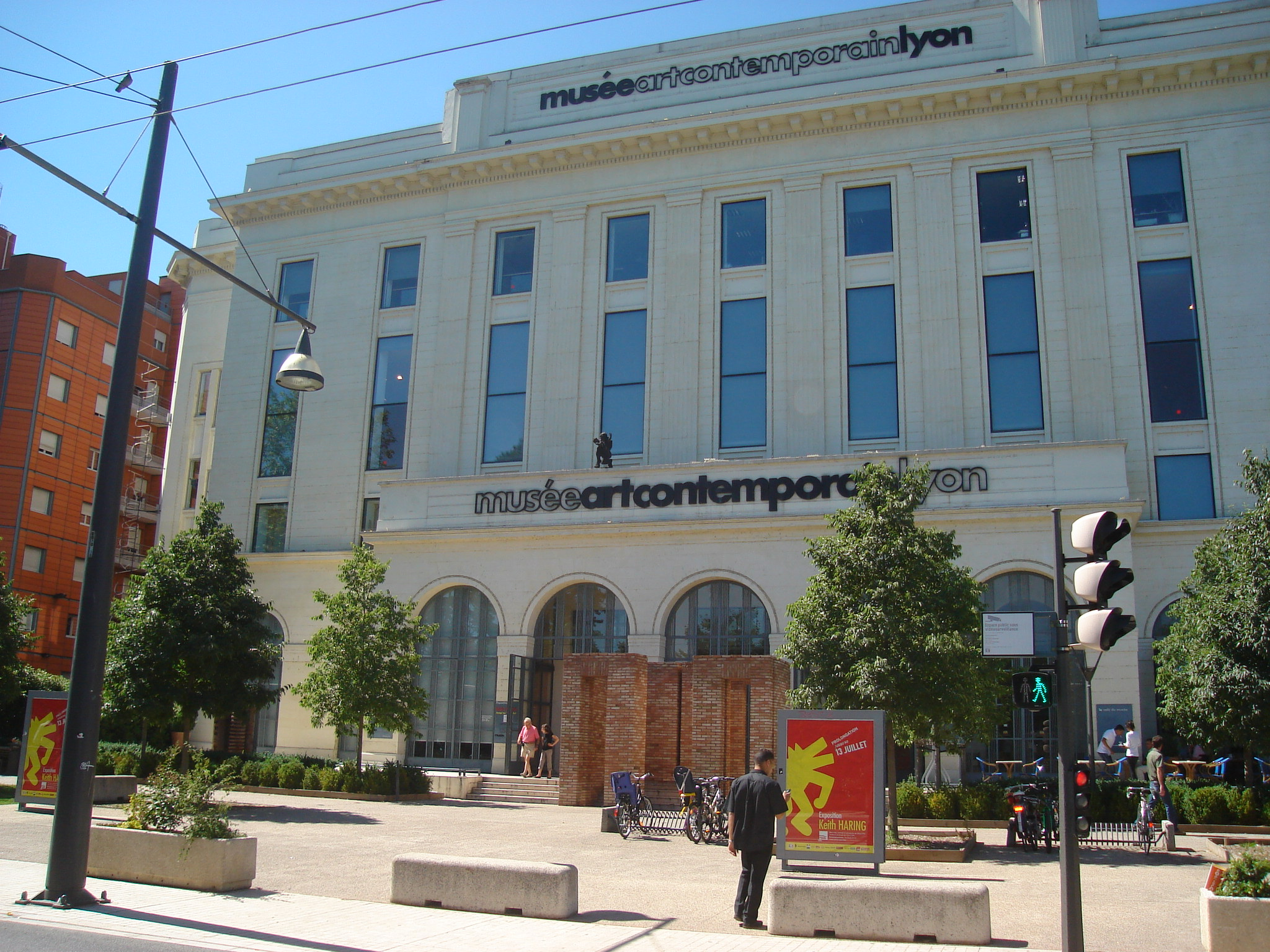
The Museum of Contemporary Art, Lyon

The 22nd G7 Summit was held at the Musée d'art contemporain de Lyon, France, on 27–29 June 1996. The locations of previous summits to have been hosted by France include: Rambouillet (1975), Versailles (1982), and Paris (1989).

The Group of Seven (G7) was an unofficial forum which brought together the heads of the richest industrialized countries: France, Germany, Italy, Japan, the United Kingdom, the United States, Canada (since 1976), and the President of the European Commission (starting officially in 1981). The summits were not meant to be linked formally with wider international institutions; and in fact, a mild rebellion against the stiff formality of other international meetings was a part of the genesis of cooperation between France's president Valéry Giscard d'Estaing and West Germany's chancellor Helmut Schmidt as they conceived the first Group of Six (G6) summit in 1975.

A pre-summit was held in Moscow, Russia, from 19 to 20 April to deal with nuclear security issues.

== Leaders at the summit ==
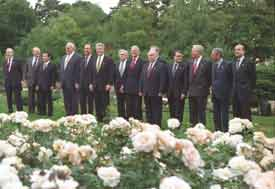
Leaders who attend the summit.

The G7 is an unofficial annual forum for the leaders of Canada, the European Commission, France, Germany, Italy, Japan, the United Kingdom and the United States.

The 22nd G7 summit was the first summit for Italian Prime Minister Romano Prodi and Japanese Prime Minister Ryutaro Hashimoto. It was also the last summit for British Prime Minister John Major.

=== Participants ===
These summit participants were the current "core members" of the international forum:

**Core G7 members** Host state and leader are shown in bold text.
Member		Represented by	Title
(Canada)	Canada	Jean Chrétien	Prime Minister
(France)	**France**	**Jacques Chirac**	**President**
(Germany)	Germany	Helmut Kohl	Chancellor
(Italy)	Italy	Romano Prodi	Prime Minister
(Japan)	Japan	Ryutaro Hashimoto	Prime Minister
(United Kingdom)	United Kingdom	John Major	Prime Minister
(United States)	United States	Bill Clinton	President
(European Union)	European Commission	Jacques Santer	President
**Guest Invitees (Countries)**
Member		Represented by	Title
(Russia)	Russia	Viktor Chernomyrdin	Prime Minister
**Guest Invitees (International Institutions)**
Member		Represented by	Title
	International Monetary Fund	Michel Camdessus	managing director
(United Nations)	United Nations	Boutros Boutros-Ghali	Secretary-General
	World Bank	James Wolfensohn	President
	World Trade Organization	Renato Ruggiero	Director-General

== Priorities ==
Traditionally, the host country of the G8 summit sets the agenda for negotiations, which take place primarily amongst multi-national civil servants in the weeks before the summit itself, leading to a joint declaration which all countries can agree to sign. President Jacques Chirac suggested that the main theme of the summit should be globalization.

A French priority was the food; and the leaders did eat well. The first night of the three-day summit, they ate a dinner cooked by four chefs from towns and cities around Lyons whose restaurants have won three stars in the Michelin guide. In a serious speech in a related forum at Lyon, the IMF's leader observations about the financial consequences of globalization mirrored this focus on gastronomy when he asked lightly, "Is not France's intellectual -— and culinary! -— capital a supremely well chosen site for deeper reflection and more visionary thought?"

== Issues ==
The summit was intended as a venue for resolving differences among its members. As a practical matter, the summit was also conceived as an opportunity for its members to give each other mutual encouragement in the face of difficult economic decisions. Issues which were discussed at this summit included:

- Strengthening Economic And Monetary Cooperation
- Promoting Strong And Mutually Beneficial Growth Of Trade And Investment
- Enhancing Our Approach To Employment Problems
- Implementing A New Global Partnership For Development: An Ambition for the 21st Century
- Enhancing The Effectiveness Of Multilateral Institutions for the Benefit Of Development
- Providing The Necessary Multilateral Support For Development
- Toward Successful Integration Of Countries in Transition into The Global Economy

== Accomplishments ==
This G7 summit was an international event was observed and reported by the world news media, with a resulting emphasis upon the worthy and the self-evident. The G7 summits have since mutated into media events, but a few long notable innovations began in this context:

=== Financial crisis and stability ===
Work in connection with G7 concern about financial market stability began at the Lyon summit. The 1995 collapse of Barings Bank demonstrated the fragile and interconnected nature of modern financial markets; and it suggested inherent dangers of contagion and systemic collapse following a single event. Subsequent meetings continued to explore the avenues for cooperation which were identified at Lyon.

=== Transnational organized Crime ===
Following the Halifax summit in 1995, a group of experts was brought together to investigate better ways to fight transnational crime. This group (later known as the "Lyon Group") proffered forty recommendations which were endorsed by the G7 heads of state at Lyon. The Lyon Group developed sub-groups to address specific crime-related issues (e.g., legal processes for evidence-sharing, high-tech crime, and immigration fraud and human trafficking); and these groups continued to work together in subsequent years.

=== Terrorism ===
In the wake of a terrorist bombing in Saudi Arabia shortly before the summit began, President Bill Clinton tried to encourage discussion about mitigating the growth of international terrorism. Clinton's push for adopting a 40-point list of recommendations against terrorism was "good politics" but the elements were in fact only partly aimed at terrorism, being politically "recycled" from work of the task group on transnational crime. The Lyon "Declaration on Terrorism" was issued immediately after the working dinner of the G7 leaders on 27 June.

== Budget ==
Summit organizers estimate the costs at about $4 million, but they expected the visitors to spend more than $5 million.

American spending was noteworthy. The US delegation rented an entire hotel (167 rooms), which served as the unofficial White House during the Clintons' three-day stay. Special modifications were made to accommodate the special requirements of the Americans. For example, one of the meeting rooms was specially equipped with more than 200 telephones, some of which were directly linked to the White House. The armored presidential limousine which was transported from Washington, D.C. via a jumbo jet, and it was guarded and garaged at the hotel. Moreover, special generators were temporarily installed to accommodate extra electrical needs and their capacity would be able to support lighting the entire city of Lyon.

== Organisation and logistics ==
The event took place at the Museum of Contemporary Art. The guests had lunch at the nearby Parc de la Tête d'or rose garden and dinner at Leon de Lyon, a renowned Lyon restaurant.

With the occasion of the G7, Lyon organised fireworks and a concert featuring Bob Dylan and French rock star Johnny Hallyday. The first ladies were invited by Chirac's wife to a visit to the Beaujolais wine region.

A statue was inaugurated in the Parc de la Tete d'or by the presidents with inspiration on the saying by Archimedes "Give me a lever long enough and a place to stand and I could lift the world."

== Gallery of participating leaders ==
=== Core G7 participants ===
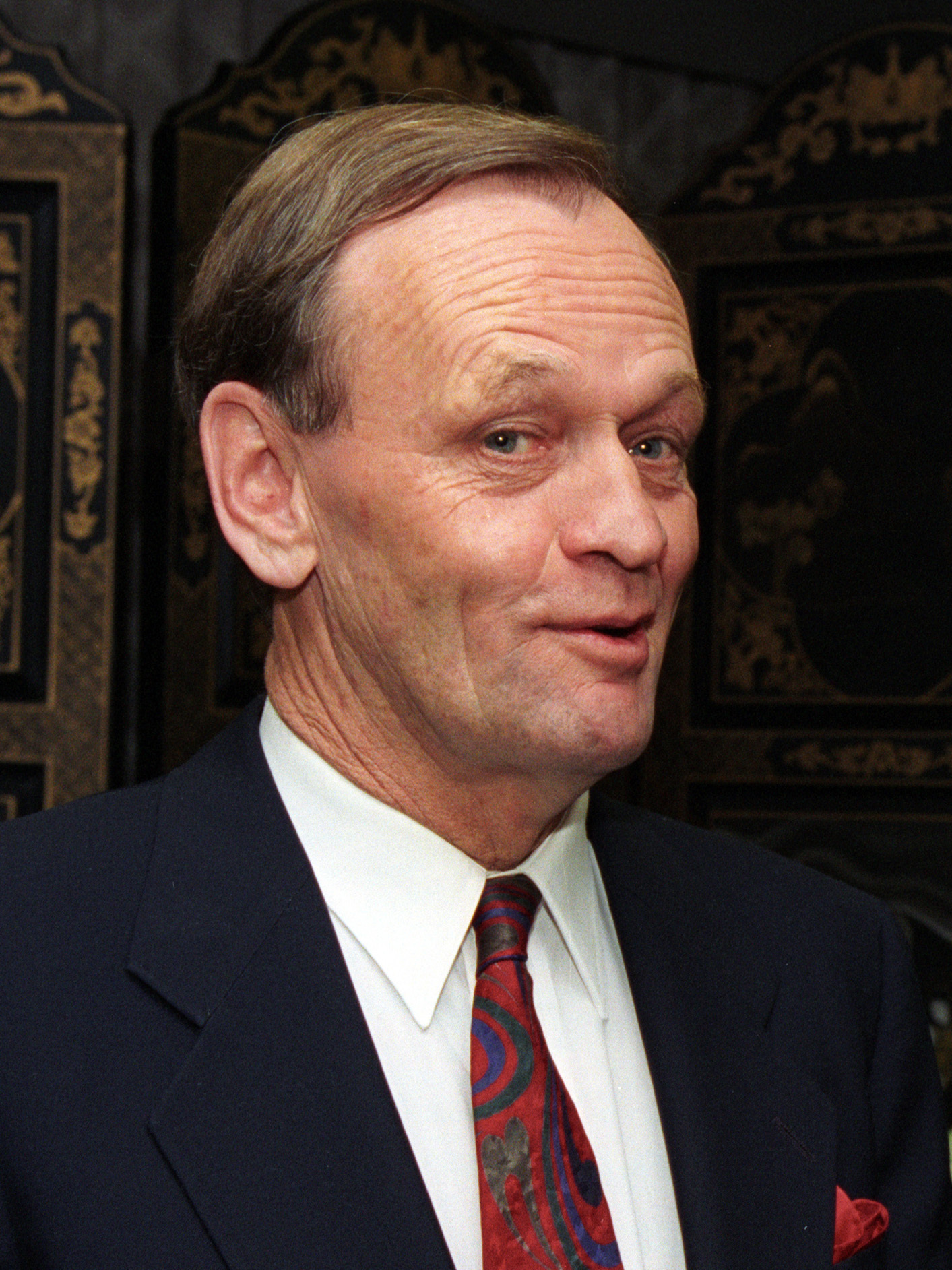
(Canada) Canada
Jean Chrétien,
Prime Minister

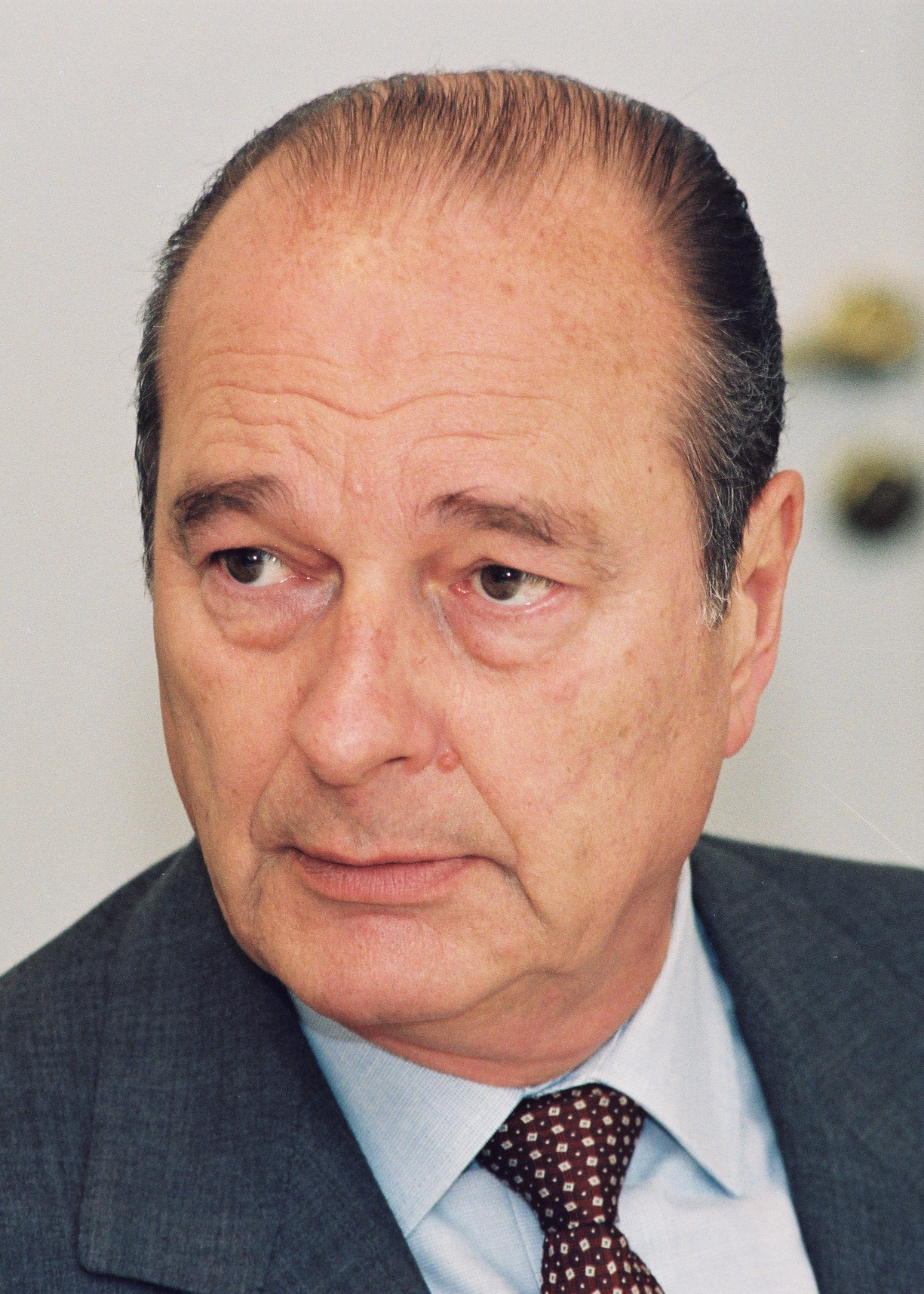
(France) France
Jacques Chirac,
President (Host)

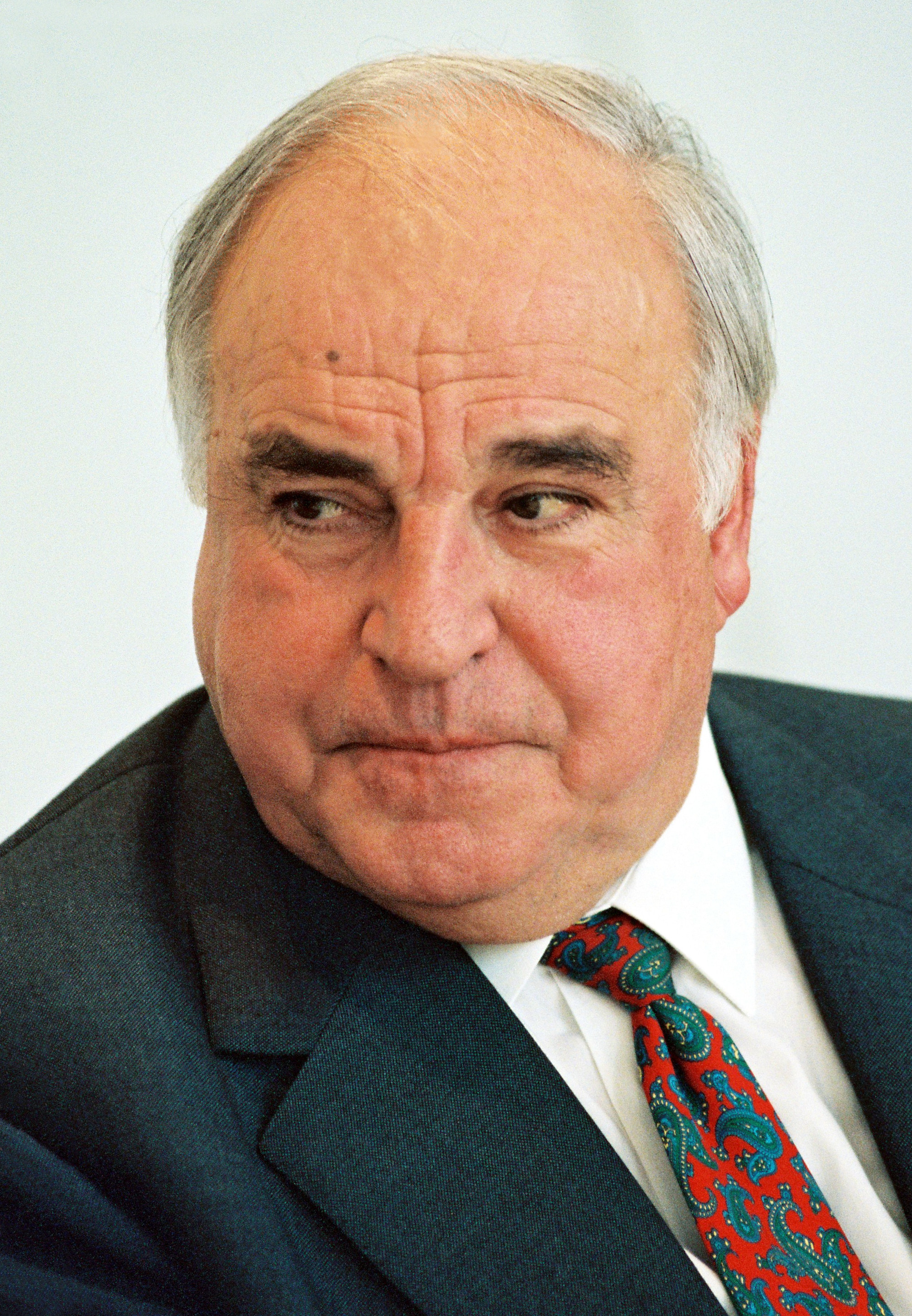
(Germany) Germany
Helmut Kohl,
Chancellor

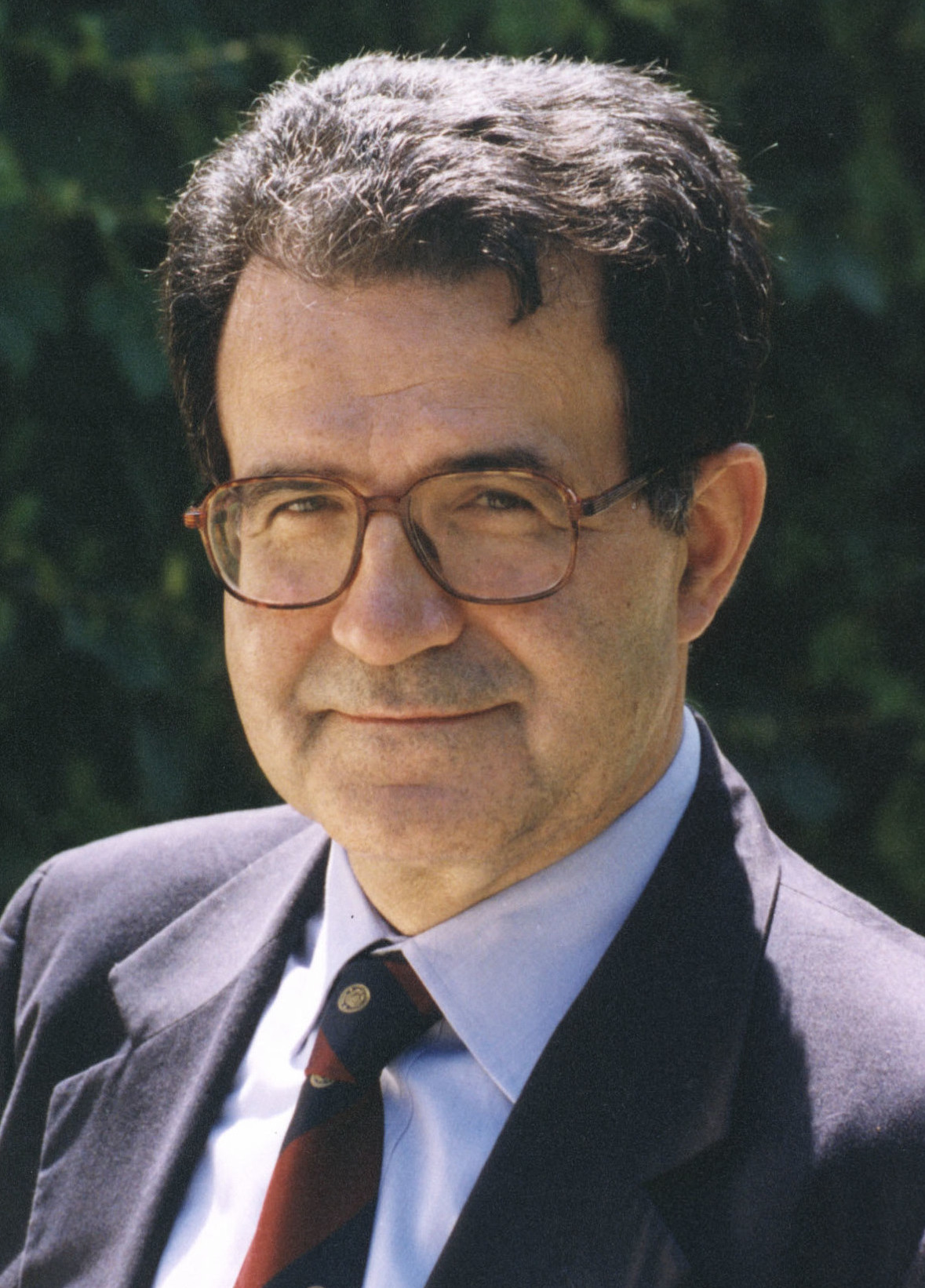
(Italy) Italy
Romano Prodi,
Prime Minister

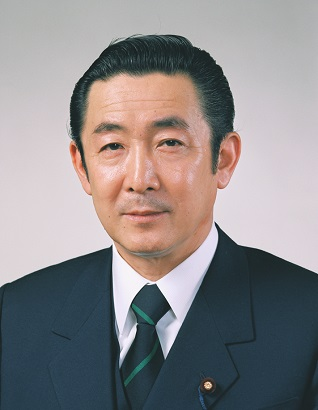
(Japan) Japan
Ryutaro Hashimoto,
Prime Minister

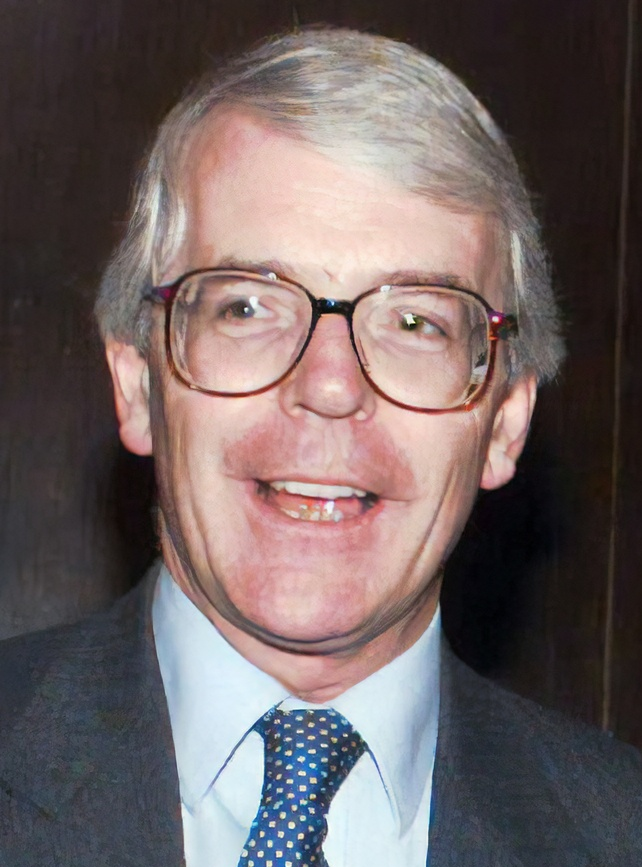
(United Kingdom) United Kingdom
John Major,
Prime Minister

(United States) United States
Bill Clinton,
President

== See also ==
- G8
