= APEC Indonesia 1994 =

APEC annual meeting

- Host country: Indonesia
- Date: 15–16 November
- Venues: Bogor Palace, West Java
- Follows: 1993
- Precedes: 1995

APEC Indonesia 1994 was a series of Asia-Pacific Economic Cooperation meetings focused on economic cooperation, held at the Bogor Palace in Bogor, West Java, Indonesia on 15–16 November 1994. It was the seventh APEC meeting in history and the first held in Indonesia.

== Results ==
The meeting adopted "the long-term goal of free and open trade and investment in the Asia-Pacific", that has been called the "Bogor Goals". It is one of APEC's flagship initiatives.
