= 1994 Brussels NATO summit =

1994 NATO summit meeting in Brussels, Belgium

1994 Brussels summit
- Host country: Belgium
- Dates: 10–11 January 1994

The 1994 Brussels summit was the 13th NATO summit bringing the leaders of member nations together at the same time. The formal sessions and informal meetings in Brussels, Belgium took place on 10–11 January 1994.

== Background ==
In this period, the organization faced conventional questions about whether a new generation of leaders would be as committed to NATO as their predecessors had been, but events gave those concerns a new spin. In August 1994, NATO air strikes were ordered in an attempt to protect UN safe havens and deter the Bosnia Serbs from further aggression.

== Agenda ==
The general discussions focused on the reaffirmation of alliance readiness to carry out air strikes in support of UN objectives in Bosnia and Herzegovina. Also discussed was the launching of the Partnership for Peace (PfP) initiative in which all North Atlantic Cooperation Council partner countries and members of the Conference on Security and Cooperation in Europe (CSCE) were invited to participate.

== Accomplishments ==
The summit's work was followed by publication of the Partnership for Peace Framework Document.

The summit leaders endorsed the concept of Combined Joint Task Forces (CJTFs) and other measures to develop the European Security and Defence Identity.

== See also ==
- EU summit
- G8 summit
