= List of international presidential trips made by George H. W. Bush =

This is a list of international presidential trips made by George H. W. Bush, the 41st president of the United States. George H. W. Bush made 25 international trips to 37 countries during his presidency, which began on January 20, 1989 and ended on January 20, 1993.

Bush visited six continents: Africa, Asia, Australia, Europe, North America, and South America. He initiated the frequent international travel pace that is the hallmark of the post–Cold War presidency. He went to Europe eleven times, Asia twice, and South America once, along with a number of shorter trips during his four years in office.

== Summary ==
The number of visits per country where President Bush travelled are:

- One visit to Argentina, Australia, Chile, China, Colombia, Costa Rica, Czechoslovakia, Egypt, Greece, Hungary, Malta, Mexico, Panama, Russia, Singapore, Somalia, Soviet Union, Spain, Switzerland, Turkey, Uruguay and Venezuela
- Two visits to Belgium, Bermuda, Brazil, Finland, Italy, Japan, Netherlands, Poland, Saudi Arabia, South Korea and Vatican City
- Three visits to Germany and the United Kingdom
- Four visits to Canada
- Six visits to France

World map highlighting countries visited by George H. W. Bush while president.

== 1989 ==
	Country	Areas visited	Dates	Details	Image
1	Canada	Ottawa	February 10	Met with Prime Minister Brian Mulroney.	
2	Japan	Tokyo	February 23–25	Attended the funeral of Emperor Hirohito. Met with Emperor Akihito of Japan, the kings of Belgium, Jordan and Spain, the presidents of Brazil, Egypt, France, the Federal Republic of Germany, Israel, Italy, Nigeria, the Philippines, Portugal and Zaire, and the prime ministers of Japan, Pakistan, Singapore, Thailand and Turkey.	
2	China	Beijing	February 25–27	Met with President Yang Shangkun and Premier Li Peng. Also met with Prince Sihanouk of Cambodia.	
2	South Korea	Seoul	February 27	Official visit. Addressed the National Assembly.	
3	Italy	Rome, Nettuno	May 26–28	Met with President Francesco Cossiga and Prime Minister Ciriaco De Mita.	
3	Vatican City	Apostolic Palalce	May 27	Audience with Pope John Paul II.	
3	Belgium	Brussels	May 28–30	Attended the NATO Summit Meeting. Present were the heads of state and government of Canada, Denmark, France, Federal Republic of Germany, Greece, Iceland, Italy, Luxembourg, Norway, Portugal, Spain, Turkey, and the United Kingdom.	
3	West Germany	Bonn, Mainz	May 30–31	Met with Chancellor Helmut Kohl.	
3	United Kingdom	London	May 31 – June 2	Met with Queen Elizabeth II and Prime Minister Margaret Thatcher.	
4	Polish People's Republic	Warsaw, Gdańsk	July 9–11	Met with government and Solidarity leaders. Addressed the National Assembly.	
4	Hungary	Budapest	July 11–13	Met with Hungarian officials. Delivered an address at Karl Marx University.	
4	France	Paris	July 13–17	Attended the 15th G7 summit. Also attended ceremonies for the bicentennial of the French Revolution. Met with Ivorian president Félix Houphouët-Boigny.	
4	Netherlands	The Hague; Leiden	July 17–18	Met with Queen Beatrix and Prime Minister Ruud Lubbers. Delivered a public address.	
5	Costa Rica	San José	October 27–28	Attended the Hemispheric Summit Meeting.	
6	Malta	Valletta, Marsaxlokk	December 1–3	Attended the Summit Meeting with Soviet general secretary Mikhail Gorbachev. Also met with Maltese Prime Minister Eddie Fenech Adami.	
6	Belgium	Brussels	December 3–4	Attended the NATO Summit Meeting, and briefed leaders on the Malta U.S.-Soviet Summit Meeting.	
7	France	Marigot, Saint Martin	December 16	Informal meeting with President François Mitterrand.	

== 1990 ==
	Country	Areas visited	Dates	Details	Image
8	Colombia	Cartagena	February 15	Attended the Summit Meeting on the Control of Illicit Drug Trafficking with the president Virgilio Barco Vargas, Bolivian president Jaime Paz Zamora and Peruvian president Alan García Pérez.	
9	Canada	Toronto	April 10	Informal meeting with Prime Minister Brian Mulroney.	
10	Bermuda	Hamilton	April 13–14	Informal meeting with Prime Minister Margaret Thatcher.	
11	United Kingdom	London	July 5–6	Attended the NATO Summit Meeting.	
12	Finland	Helsinki	September 8–9	Attended Summit Meeting with Soviet president Mikhail Gorbachev. Issued joint statement on the Persian Gulf crisis. Also met with President Mauno Koivisto.	
13	Czechoslovakia	Prague	November 17	Attended ceremonies commemorating the first anniversary of the Velvet Revolution. Addressed the Federal Assembly.	
13	Germany	Speyer, Ludwigshafen	November 18	Met with Chancellor Helmut Kohl.	
13	France	Paris	November 18–21	Attended the CSCE Summit Meeting and the signing of the Treaty on Conventional Armed Forces in Europe.	
13	Saudi Arabia	Jeddah, Dhahran	November 21–22	Met with King Fahd and the Emir of Kuwait. Addressed U.S. and British military personnel in eastern Saudi Arabia.	
13	Egypt	Cairo	November 22–23	Discussed the Persian Gulf crisis with President Hosni Mubarak.	
13	Switzerland	Geneva	November 23	Discussed the Persian Gulf crisis with Syrian president Hafez al-Assad.	
14	Mexico	Monterrey, Agualeguas	November 26–27	State visit. met with President Carlos Salinas de Gortari.	
15	Brazil	Brasília	December 3–4	Met with President Fernando Collor de Mello. Addressed a Joint Session of the Brazilian Congress.	
15	Uruguay	Montevideo	December 4–5	Met with President Luis Alberto Lacalle. Addressed a Joint Session of the Uruguayan Congress.	
15	Argentina	Buenos Aires	December 5–6	Met with President Carlos Menem. Addressed a Joint Session of the Argentinean Congress.	
15	Chile	Santiago	December 6–7	Met with President Patricio Aylwin. Addressed a Joint Session of the Chilean Congress.	
15	Venezuela	Caracas	December 7–8	Met with President Carlos Andrés Pérez.	

== 1991 ==
	Country	Areas visited	Dates	Details	Image
16	Canada	Ottawa	March 13–14	Met with Prime Minister Brian Mulroney. Signed an Air Quality Agreement.	
16	France	Fort-de-France, Martinique	March 14	Discussed the Middle East peace process with President François Mitterrand.	
16	Bermuda	Hamilton	March 14–16	Discussed the Middle East peace process with Prime Minister John Major.	
17	Canada	Toronto	July 9	Informal meeting with Prime Minister Brian Mulroney, attending the 1991 Major League Baseball All-Star Game at SkyDome.	
18	France	Rambouillet	July 14	Discussed further sanctions against Iraq with President François Mitterrand.	
18	United Kingdom	London	July 14–18	Attended the 17th G7 summit. Also met with Soviet President Mikhail Gorbachev.	
18	Greece	Athens, Souda Bay	July 18–20	Met with Prime Minister Konstantinos Mitsotakis. Addressed U.S. and Greek military personnel.	
18	Turkey	Ankara, Istanbul	July 20–21	Met with President Turgut Ozal.	
19	Soviet Union	Moscow, Kiev	July 29 – August 1	Attended the U.S.-Soviet Summit Meeting. Signed the first Strategic Arms Reduction Treaty. Addressed the Supreme Soviet of the Ukrainian Soviet Socialist Republic.	
20	Spain	Madrid	October 29–30	Met with Prime Minister Felipe Gonzalez Marquez and Soviet president Mikhail Gorbachev. Attended the opening session of the Middle East Peace Conference.	
21	Italy	Rome	November 6–8	Attended the NATO Summit Meeting.	
21	Vatican City	Apostolic Palace	November 8	Audience with Pope John Paul II.	
21	Netherlands	The Hague	November 8–9	Attended the European Community summit Meeting.	

== 1992–1993 ==
	Country	Areas visited	Dates	Details	Image
22	Australia	Sydney, Canberra, Melbourne	December 31, 1991 – January 3	Met with Prime Minister Paul Keating and senior Australian officials. Addressed the Australian Parliament.	
22	Singapore	Singapore	January 3–5	Met with President Wee Kim Wee and Prime Minister Goh Chok Tong. Attended a meeting of the ASEAN Business Council.	
22	South Korea	Seoul	January 5–7	Met with President Roh Tae-woo and senior South Korean officials. Signed a science and technology agreement. Addressed the South Korean National Assembly. Visited U.S. military personnel.	
22	Japan	Kyoto, Kashihara, Tokyo	January 7–10	Met with Emperor Akihito, Prime Minister Kiichi Miyazawa and senior Japanese officials.	
23	Panama	Panama City	June 11	Met with President Guillermo Endara. Delivered public addresses.	
23	Brazil	Rio de Janeiro	June 12–13	Attended the Earth Summit Meeting.	
24	Poland	Warsaw	July 5	Met with President Lech Wałęsa. Attended a memorial service for former prime minister Ignacy Jan Paderewski.	
24	Germany	Munich	July 5–8	Attended the 18th G7 summit. Also met with Russian president Boris Yeltsin.	
24	Finland	Helsinki	July 8–10	Attended the CSCE Summit Meeting.	
25	Saudi Arabia	Riyadh	December 31	Met with King Fahd.	
25	Somalia	Mogadishu, Baidoa, Baledogle	December 31 – January 2, 1993	Visited international relief workers and U.S. military personnel.	
25	Russia	Moscow	January 2–3	Signed the second Strategic Arms Reduction Treaty.	
25	France	Paris	January 3–5	Discussed the Bosnian crisis with President François Mitterrand.	

== Multilateral meetings ==
Multilateral meetings of the following intergovernmental organizations took place during Grorge H. W. Bush's presidency (1989–1993).

Group	Year			
Group	1989	1990	1991	1992
G7	July 14–16 (France) Paris	July 9–11 (United States) Houston	July 15–17 (United Kingdom) London	July 6–8 (Germany) Munich
NATO	May 29–30 (Belgium) Brussels	July 5–6 (United Kingdom) London	November 7–8 (Italy) Rome	none
NATO	December 4 (Belgium) Brussels	July 5–6 (United Kingdom) London	November 7–8 (Italy) Rome	none
OSCE	November 19–21 (France) Paris	none	none	July 9–10 (Finland) Helsinki

== See also ==
- Foreign policy of the George H. W. Bush administration
- Foreign policy of the United States
