= 19th G7 summit =

1993 international leader meeting in Japan

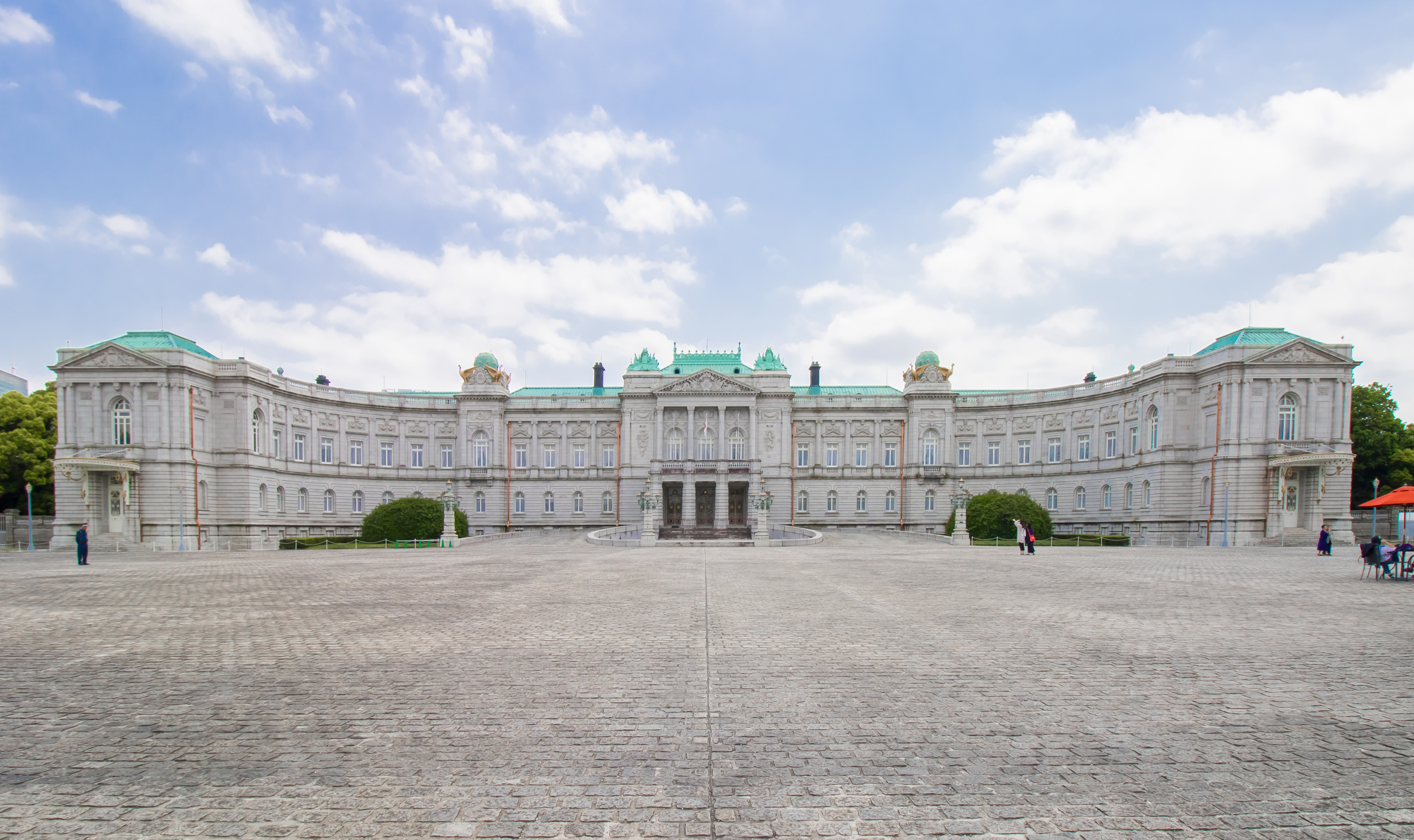
- State Guesthouse, Akasaka Palace
- Host country: Japan
- Dates: July 7–9, 1993
- Cities: Tokyo
- Venues: Akasaka Palace
- Follows: 18th G7 summit
- Precedes: 20th G7 summit

The 19th G7 Summit was held in Tokyo, Japan, on July 7–9, 1993. The venue for the summit meetings was the State Guesthouse in Tokyo, Japan.

The Group of Seven (G7) was an unofficial forum which brought together the heads of the richest industrialized countries: France, Germany, Italy, Japan, the United Kingdom, the United States, Canada (since 1976), and the President of the European Commission (starting officially in 1981). The summits were not meant to be linked formally with wider international institutions; and in fact, a mild rebellion against the stiff formality of other international meetings was a part of the genesis of cooperation between France's president Valéry Giscard d'Estaing and West Germany's chancellor Helmut Schmidt as they conceived the first Group of Six (G6) summit in 1975.

== Leaders at the summit ==
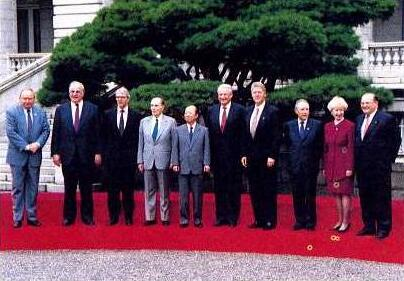
Leaders of the G7 posing for photographs in Tokyo, July 9, 1993

The G7 is an unofficial annual forum for the leaders of Canada, the European Commission, France, Germany, Italy, Japan, the United Kingdom and the United States.

The 19th G7 summit was the first summit for US president Bill Clinton and the last summit for Japanese prime minister Kiichi Miyazawa. It was also the first and only summit for Canadian prime minister Kim Campbell and Italian prime minister Carlo Azeglio Ciampi.

=== Participants ===
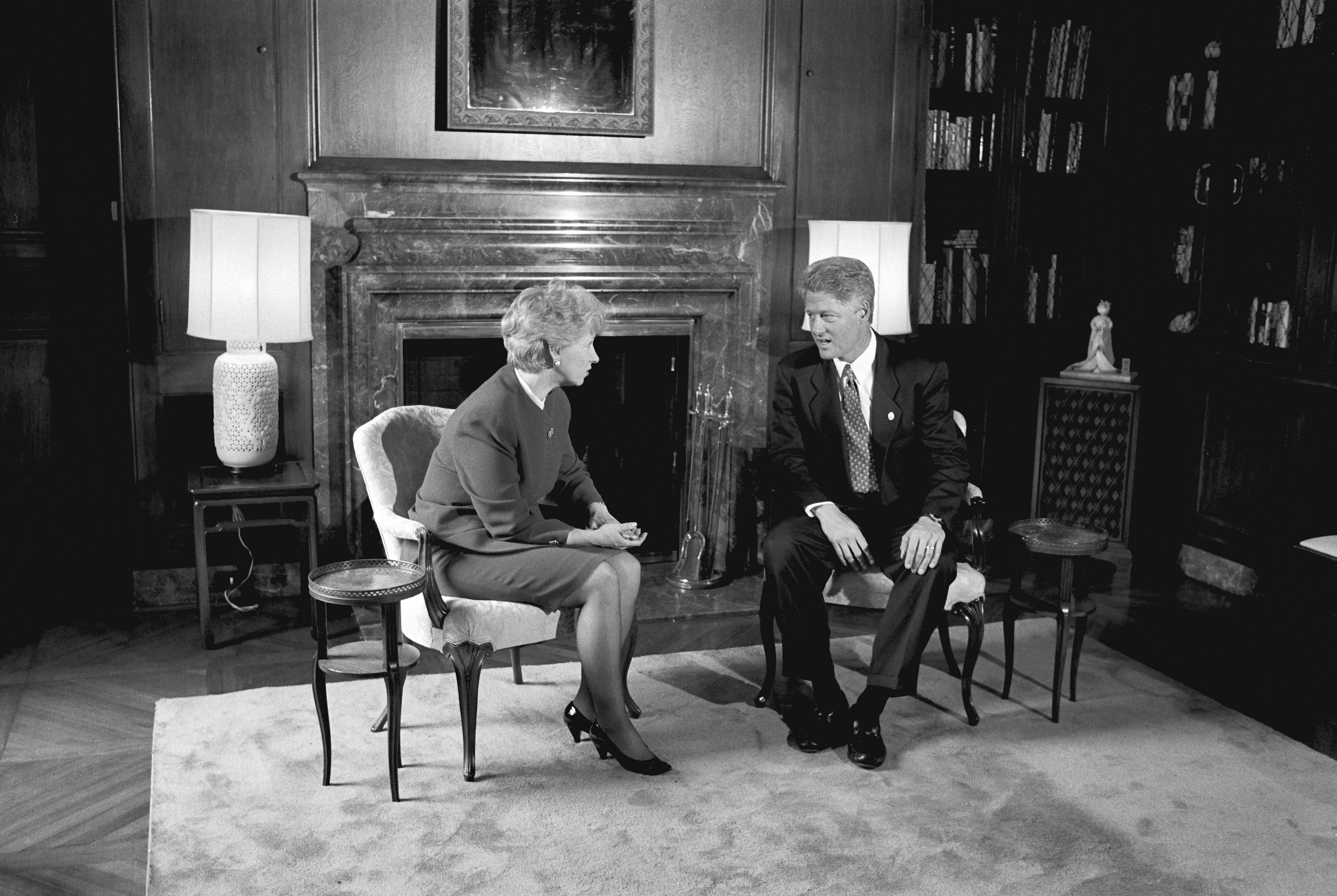
President Bill Clinton meets with Canadian Prime Minister Kim Campbell during the G7 Summit in Tokyo

These summit participants are the current "core members" of the international forum:

**Core G7 members** Host state and leader are shown in bold text.
Member		Represented by	Title
(Canada)	Canada	Kim Campbell	Prime Minister
(France)	France	François Mitterrand	President
(Germany)	Germany	Helmut Kohl	Chancellor
(Italy)	Italy	Carlo Azeglio Ciampi	Prime Minister
(Japan)	**Japan**	**Kiichi Miyazawa**	**Prime Minister**
(United Kingdom)	United Kingdom	John Major	Prime Minister
(United States)	United States	Bill Clinton	President
(European Union)	European Union	Henning Christophersen	Commission Vice-President
(European Union)	European Union	Jean-Luc Dehaene	Council President

== Issues ==
The summit was intended as a venue for resolving differences among its members. As a practical matter, the summit was also conceived as an opportunity for its members to give each other mutual encouragement in the face of difficult economic decisions. Issues which were discussed at this summit included:

- World Economy
- Trade
- The Environment
- Russia and Other Countries in Transition
- The Developing Countries
- International Cooperation and Future Summits

== Accomplishments ==
In 1993, the summit leaders called for an "international agreement" to "protect forests," but there is little evidence of follow-up action.

== Gallery of participating leaders ==
=== Core G7 participants ===
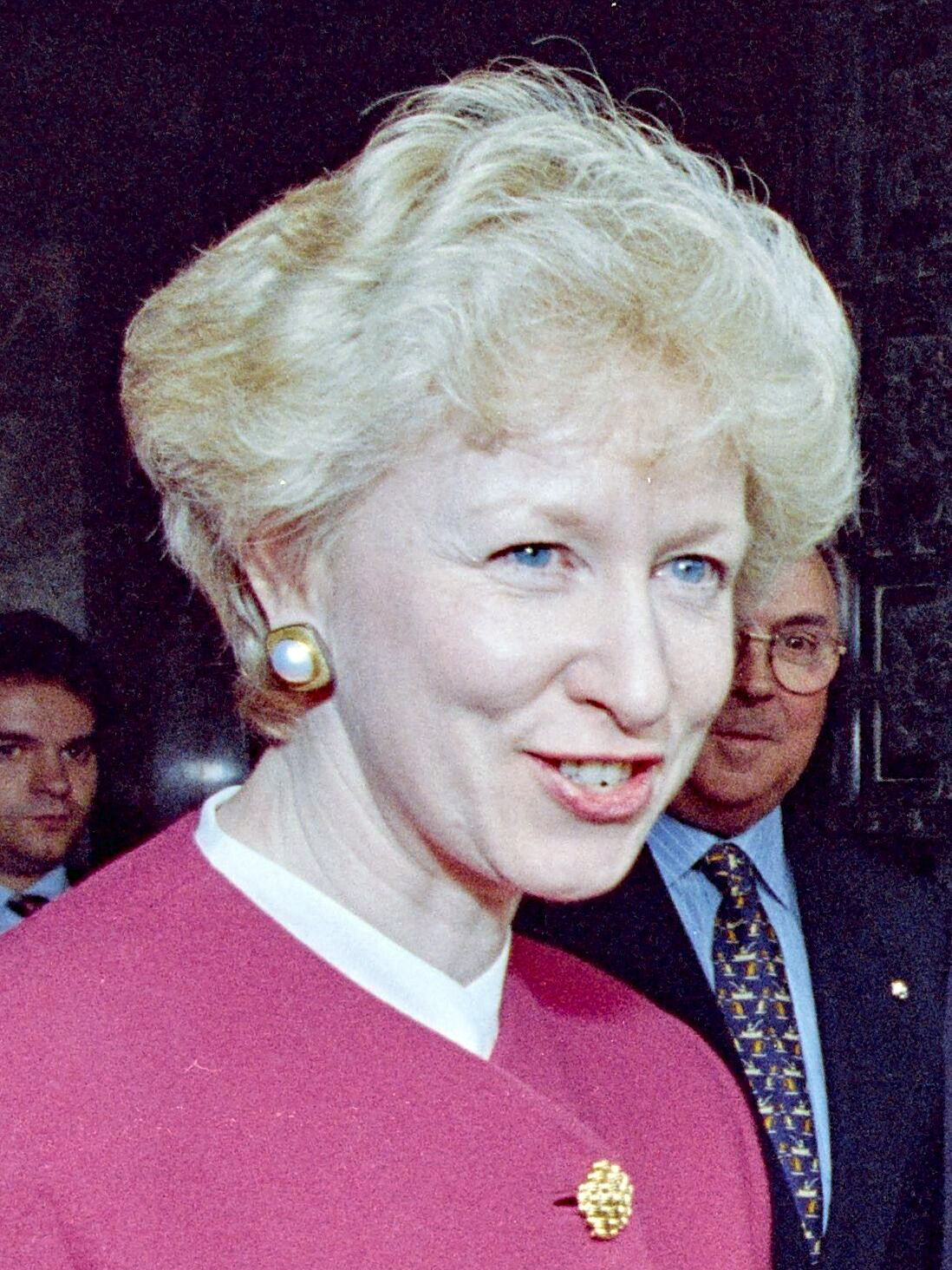
(Canada) Canada
Kim Campbell,
Prime Minister

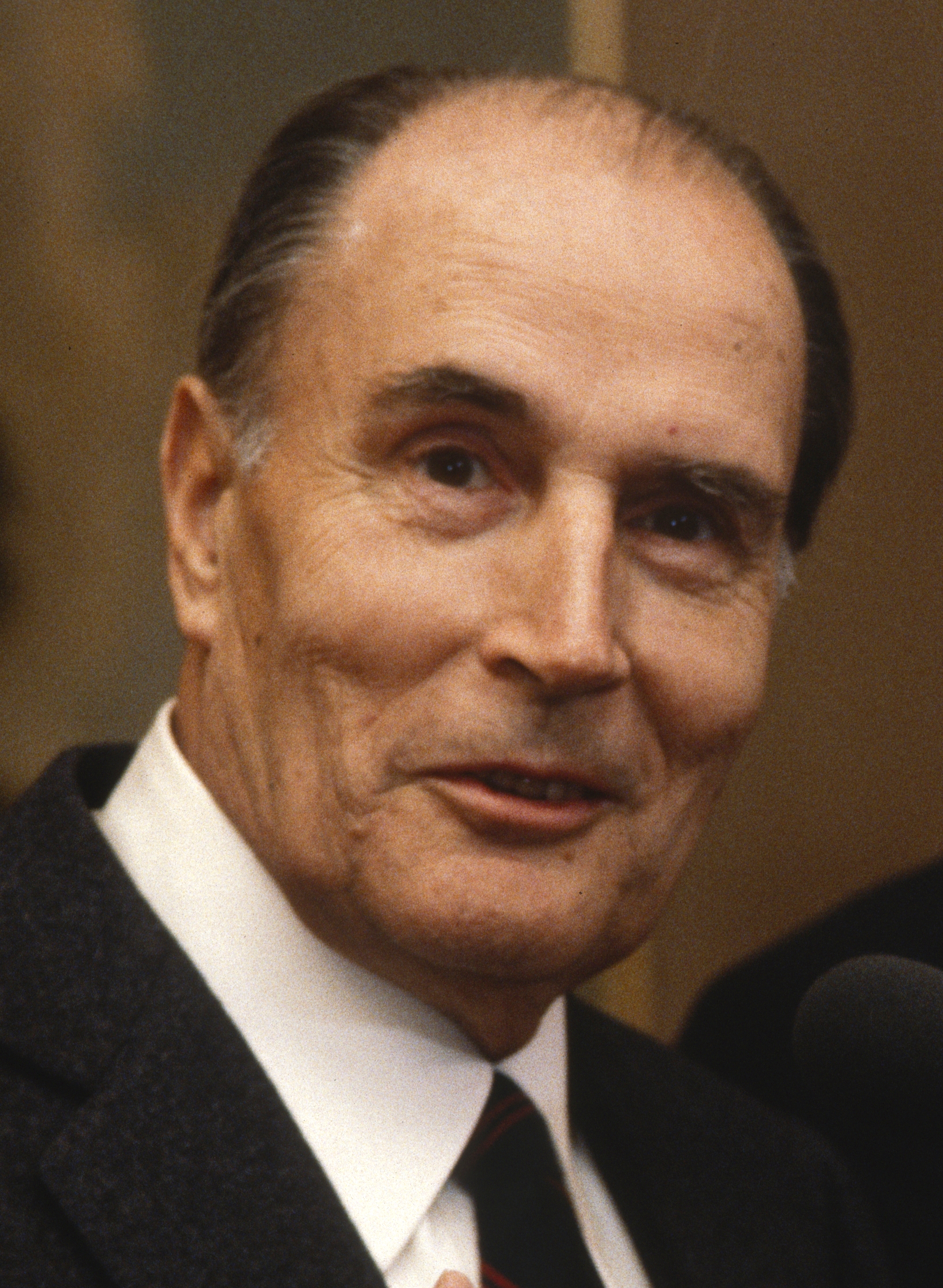
(France) France
François Mitterrand,
President

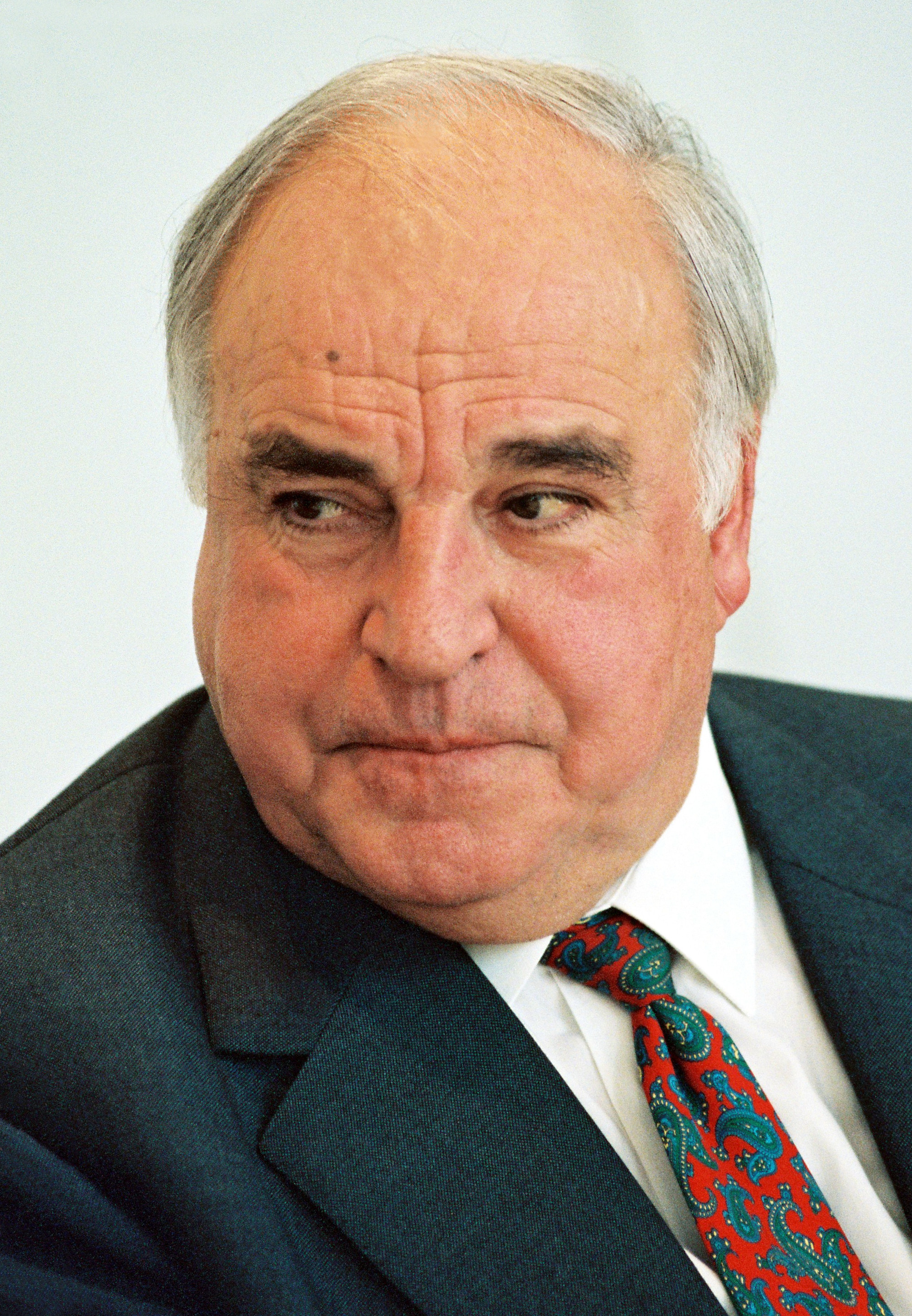
(Germany) Germany
Helmut Kohl,
Chancellor

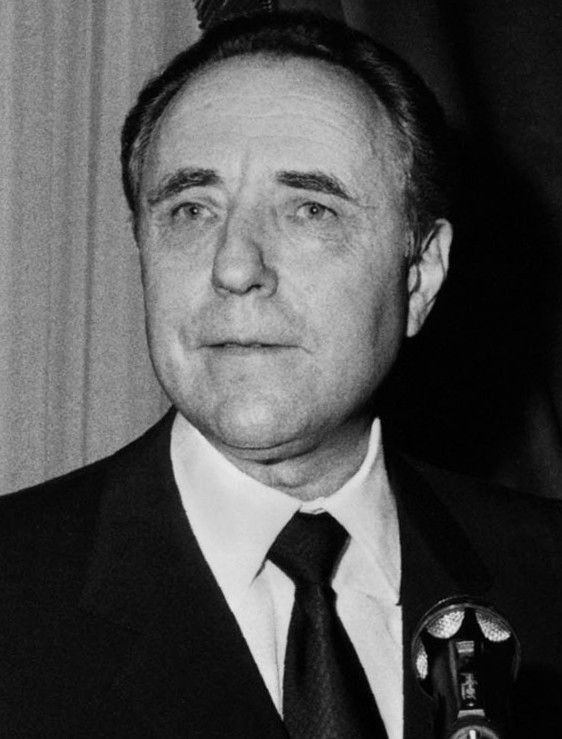
(Italy) Italy
Carlo Azeglio Ciampi,
Prime Minister

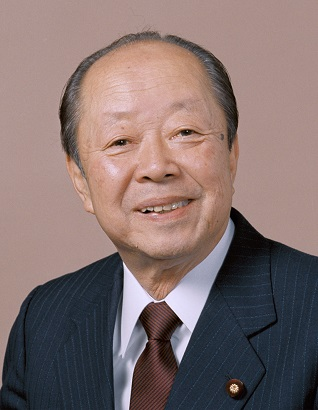
(Japan) Japan
Kiichi Miyazawa,
Prime Minister (Host)

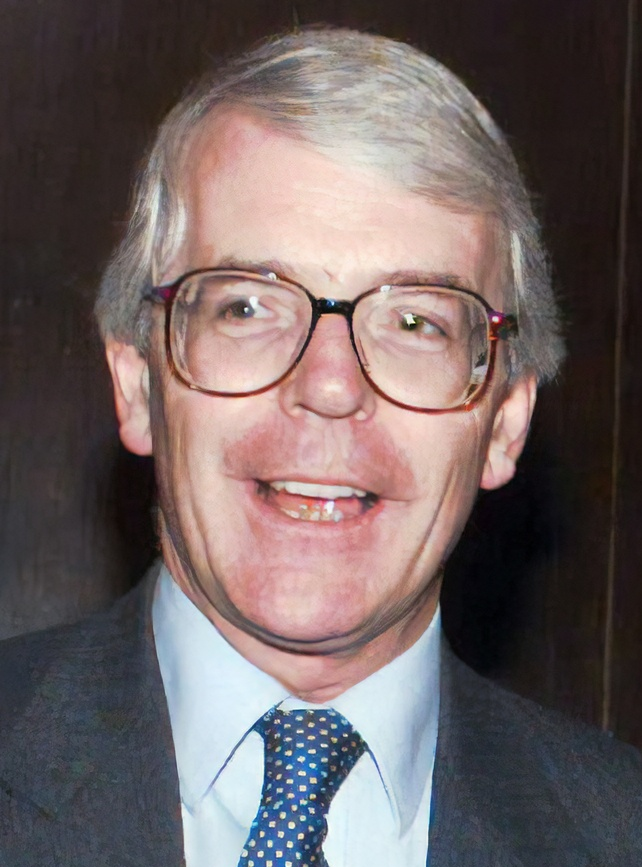
(United Kingdom) United Kingdom
John Major,
Prime Minister

(United States) United States
Bill Clinton,
President
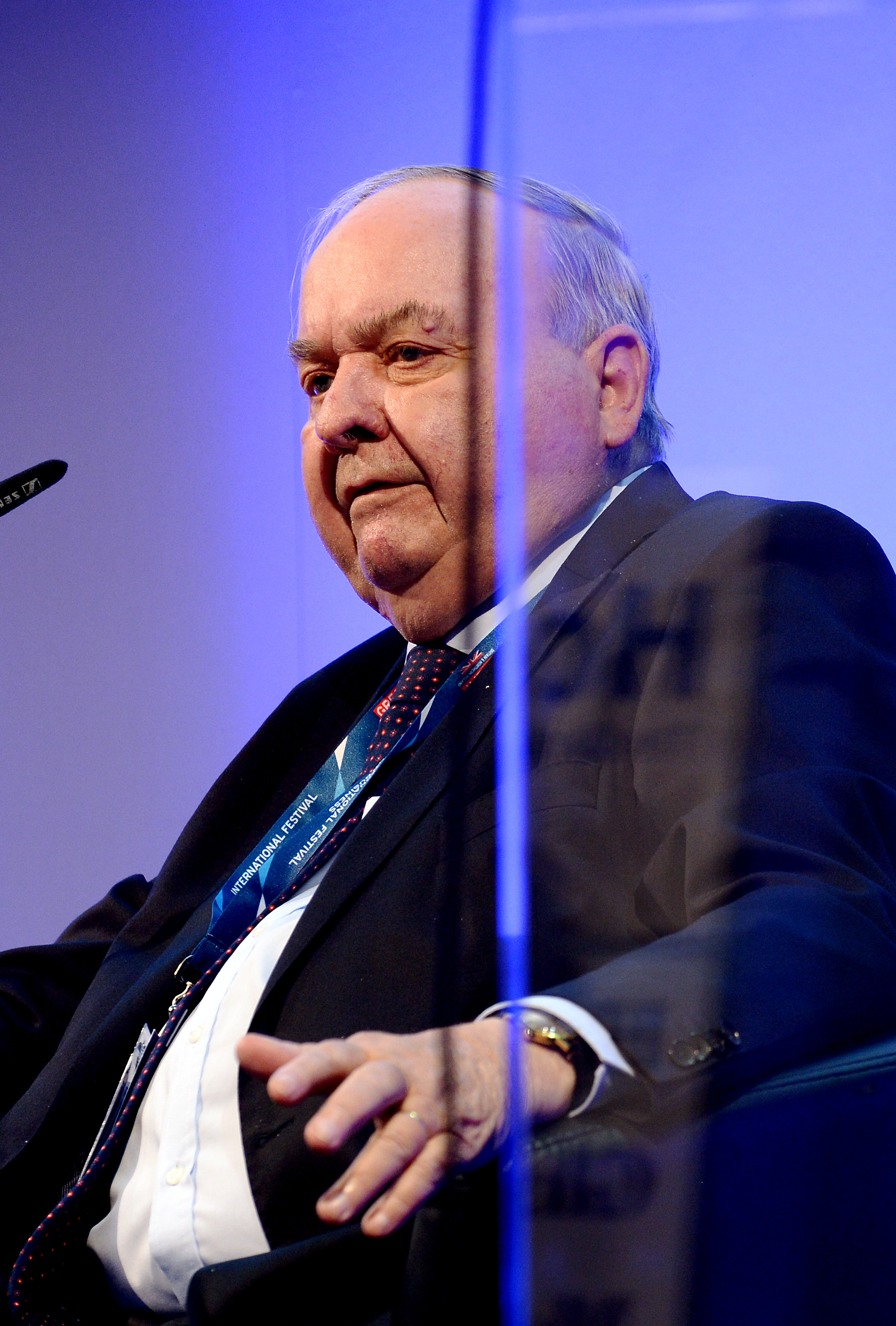
(European Union) European Union
Henning Christophersen,
Commission Vice-President

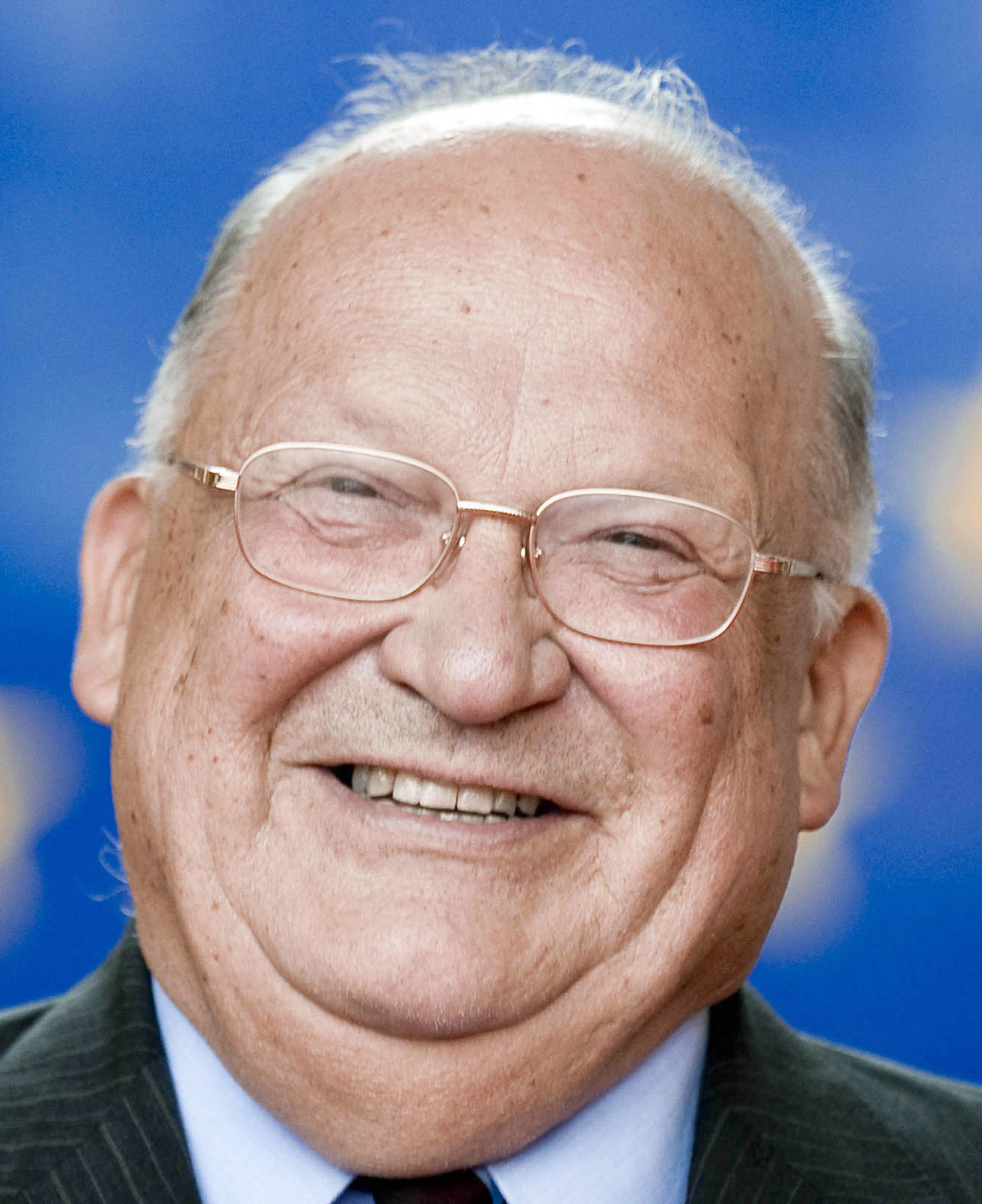
(European Union) European Union
Jean-Luc Dehaene,
Council President

== See also ==
- G8
