= 20th G7 summit =

1994 international leader meeting in Italy

- Official logo
- Host country: Italy
- Dates: 8–10 July 1994
- Cities: Naples
- Venues: Royal Palace
- Follows: 19th G7 summit
- Precedes: 21st G7 summit

The 20th G7 Summit was held in Naples, Italy, on 8–10 July 1994. The venue for the summit meetings was the former Royal Palace in Naples.

The Group of Seven (G7) was an unofficial forum which brought together the heads of the richest industrialized countries: France, Germany, Italy, Japan, the United Kingdom, the United States, Canada (since 1976), and the President of the European Commission (starting officially in 1981). The summits were not meant to be linked formally with wider international institutions; and in fact, a mild rebellion against the stiff formality of other international meetings was a part of the genesis of cooperation between France's president Valéry Giscard d'Estaing and West Germany's chancellor Helmut Schmidt as they conceived the first Group of Six (G6) summit in 1975.

== Leaders at the summit ==
The G7 is an unofficial annual forum for the leaders of Canada, the European Commission, France, Germany, Italy, Japan, the United Kingdom, and the United States.

The 20th G7 summit was the first summit for Canadian Prime Minister Jean Chrétien, Italian Prime Minister Silvio Berlusconi, and Japanese Prime Minister Tomiichi Murayama. It was also the last summit for French President François Mitterrand.

=== Participants ===
These summit participants are the current "core members" of the international forum:

**Core G7 members** Host state and leader are shown in bold text.
Member		Represented by	Title
(Canada)	Canada	Jean Chrétien	Prime Minister
(France)	France	François Mitterrand	President
(Germany)	Germany	Helmut Kohl	Chancellor
(Italy)	**Italy**	**Silvio Berlusconi**	**Prime Minister**
(Japan)	Japan	Tomiichi Murayama	Prime Minister
(United Kingdom)	United Kingdom	John Major	Prime Minister
(United States)	United States	Bill Clinton	President
(European Union)	European Union	Jacques Delors	Commission President
(European Union)	European Union	Helmut Kohl	Council President

== Agenda ==
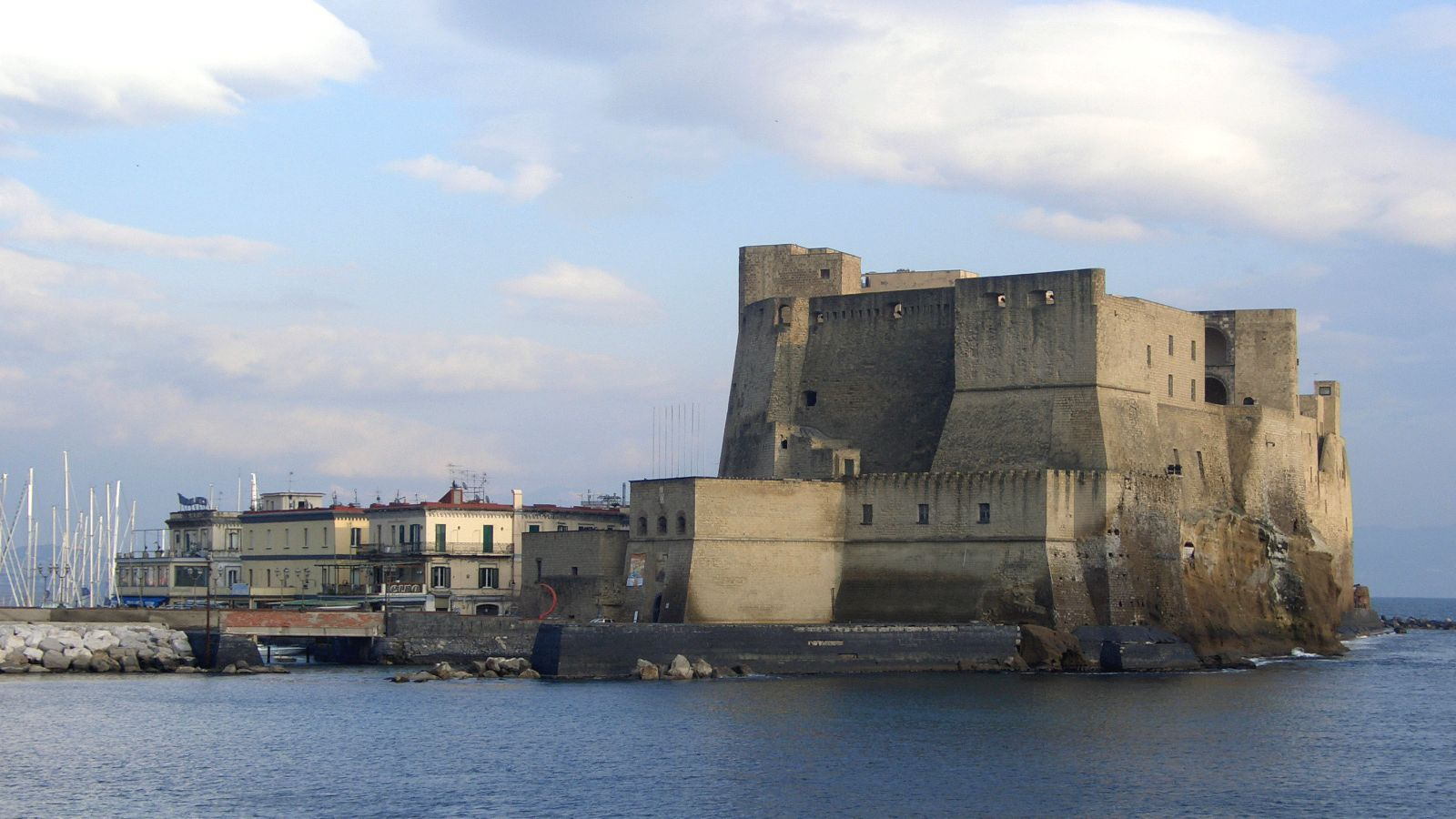
Castel dell'Ovo in the waters of the Bay of Naples

The first night of the summit included a working dinner for the international leaders. The event was organized in the dramatic setting of Castel dell'Ovo at the waters' edge of the Bay of Naples.

== Issues ==
The summit was intended as a venue for resolving differences among its members. As a practical matter, the summit was also conceived as an opportunity for its members to give each other mutual encouragement in the face of difficult economic decisions. Issues which were discussed at this summit included:

- Jobs and economic growth
- Trade
- Environment
- Developing countries
- Nuclear safety
- Ukraine
- Russia
- Other countries in transition
- Cooperation against transnational crime and money laundering

== Gallery of participating leaders ==
=== Core G7 participants ===
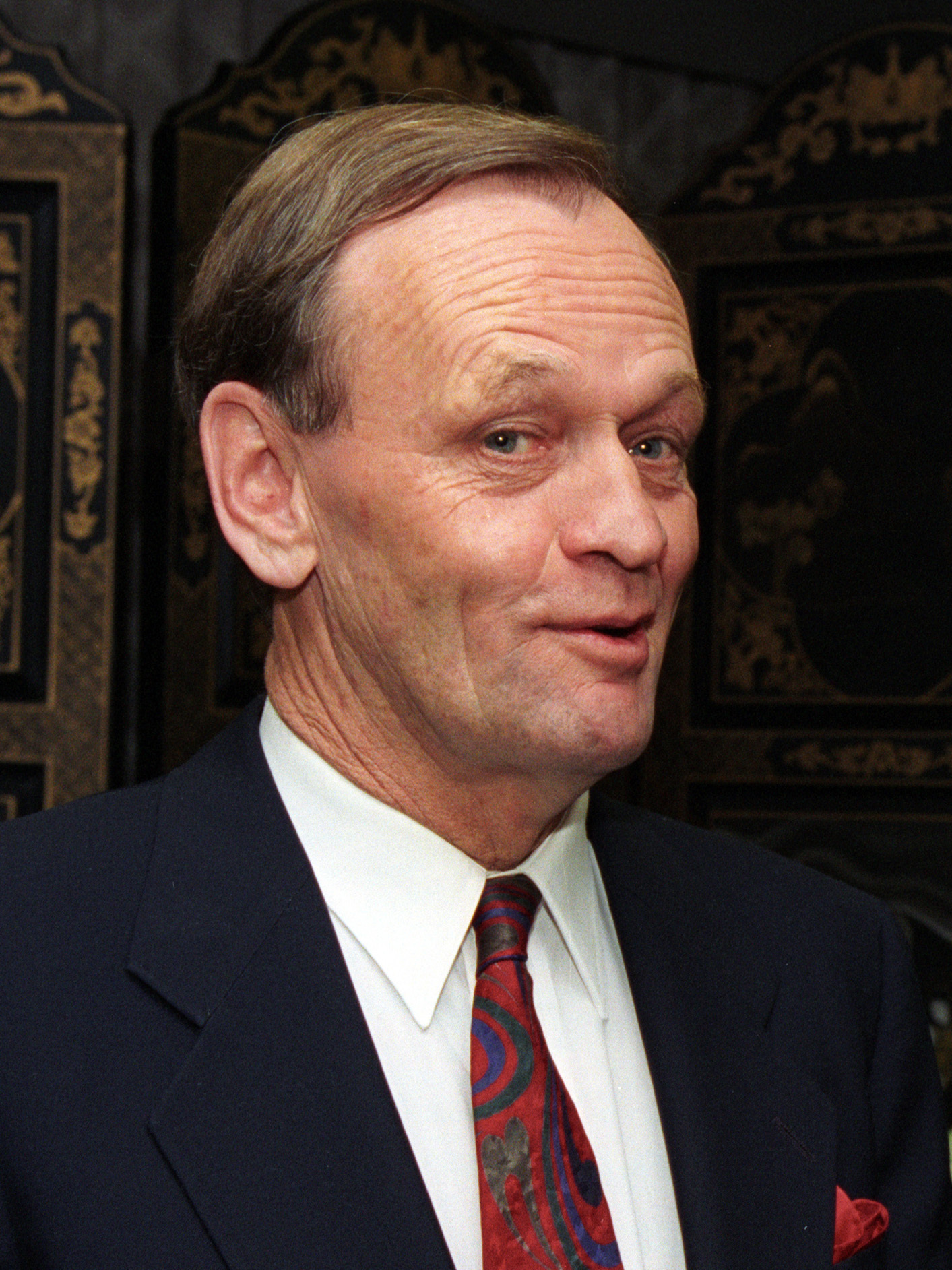
(Canada) Canada
Jean Chrétien,
Prime Minister

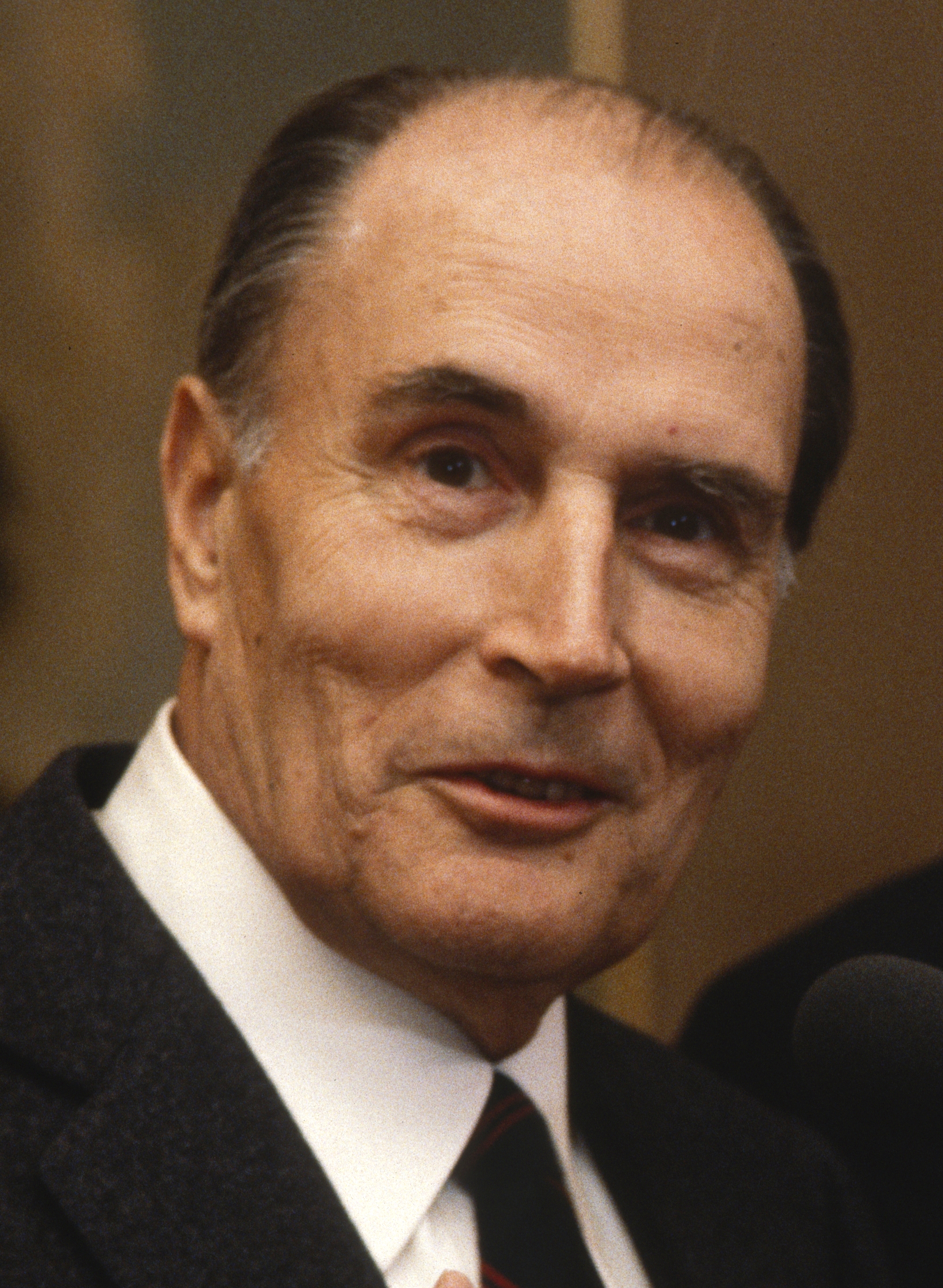
(France) France
François Mitterrand,
President

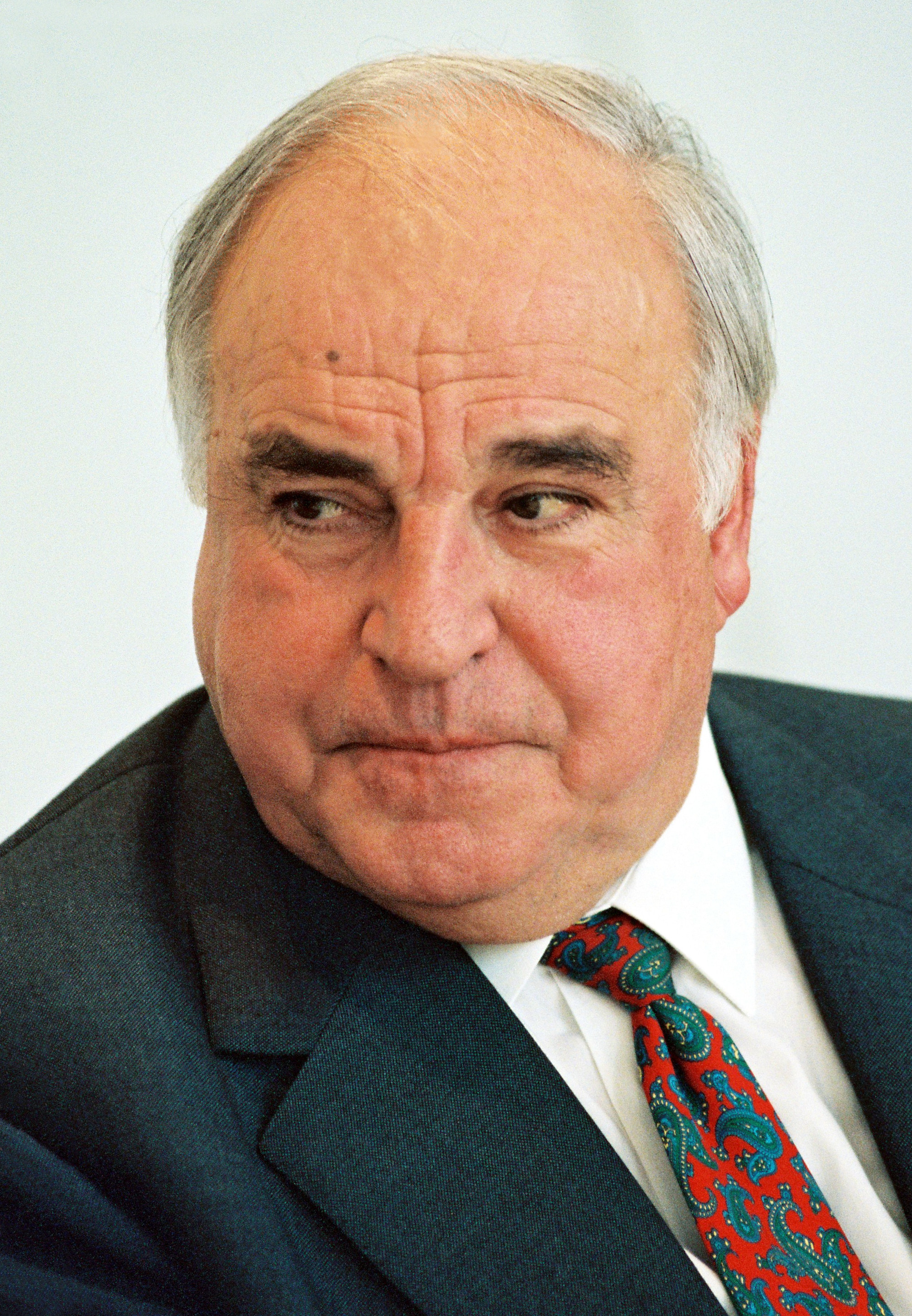
(Germany) Germany
Helmut Kohl,
Chancellor

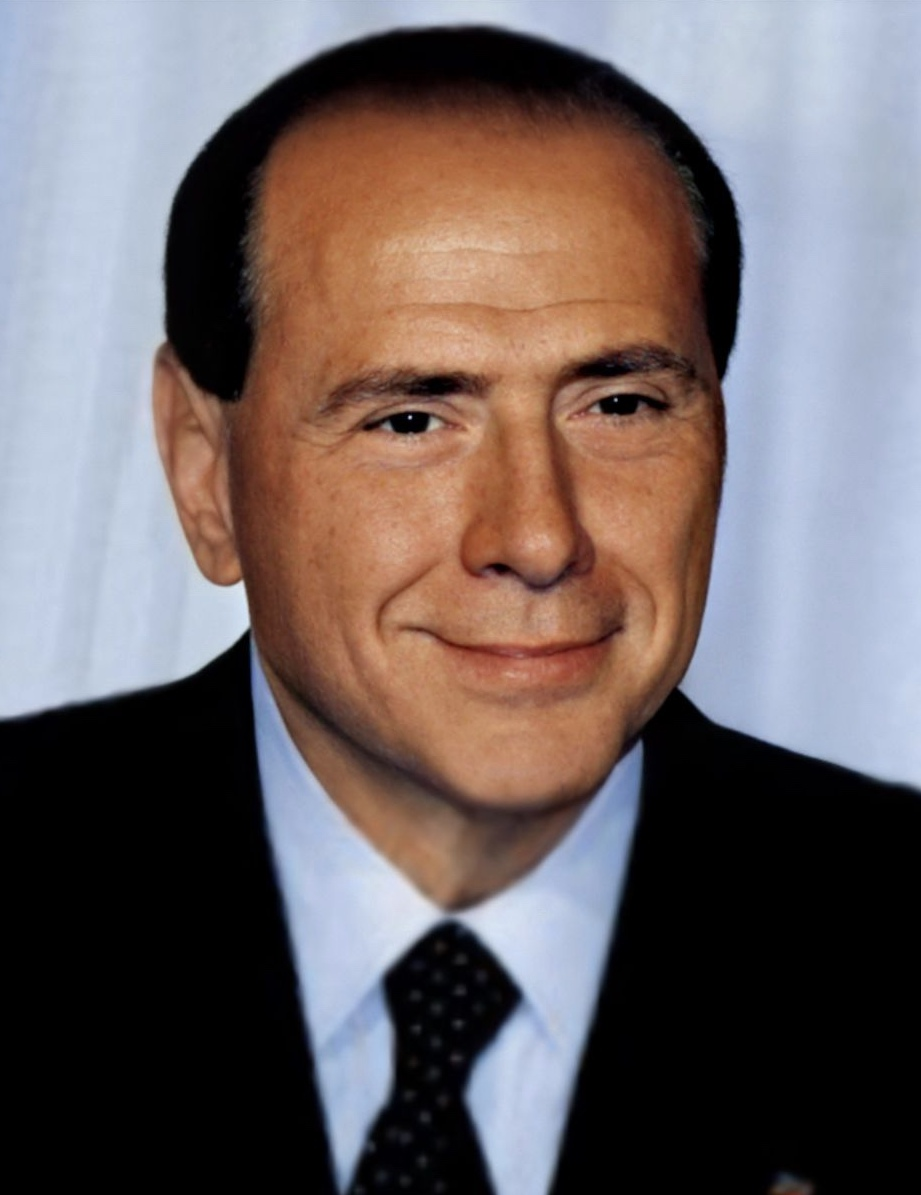
(Italy) Italy
Silvio Berlusconi,
Prime Minister (Host)

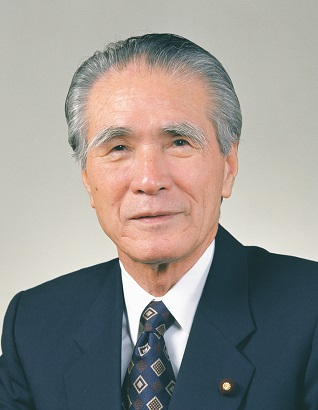
(Japan) Japan
Tomiichi Murayama,
Prime Minister

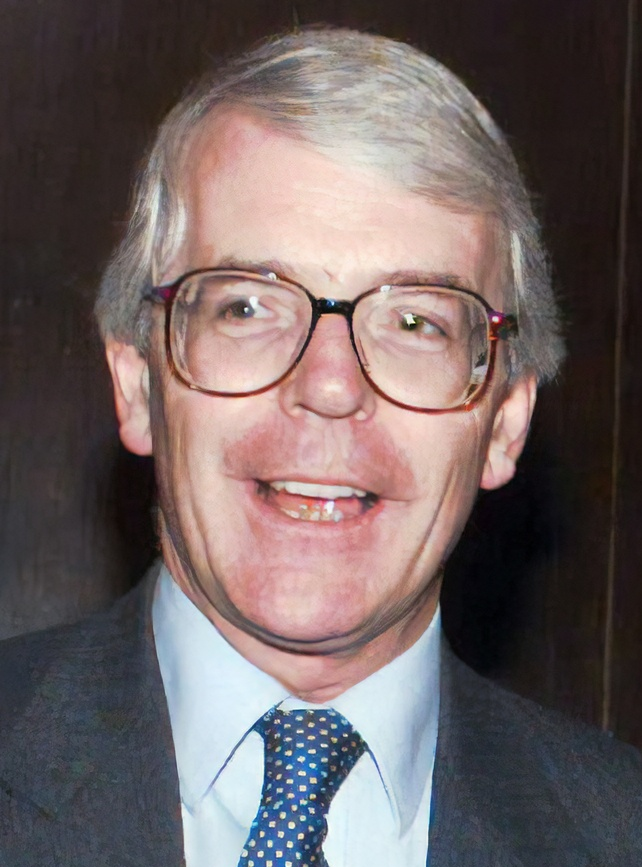
(United Kingdom) United Kingdom
John Major,
Prime Minister

(United States) United States
Bill Clinton,
President
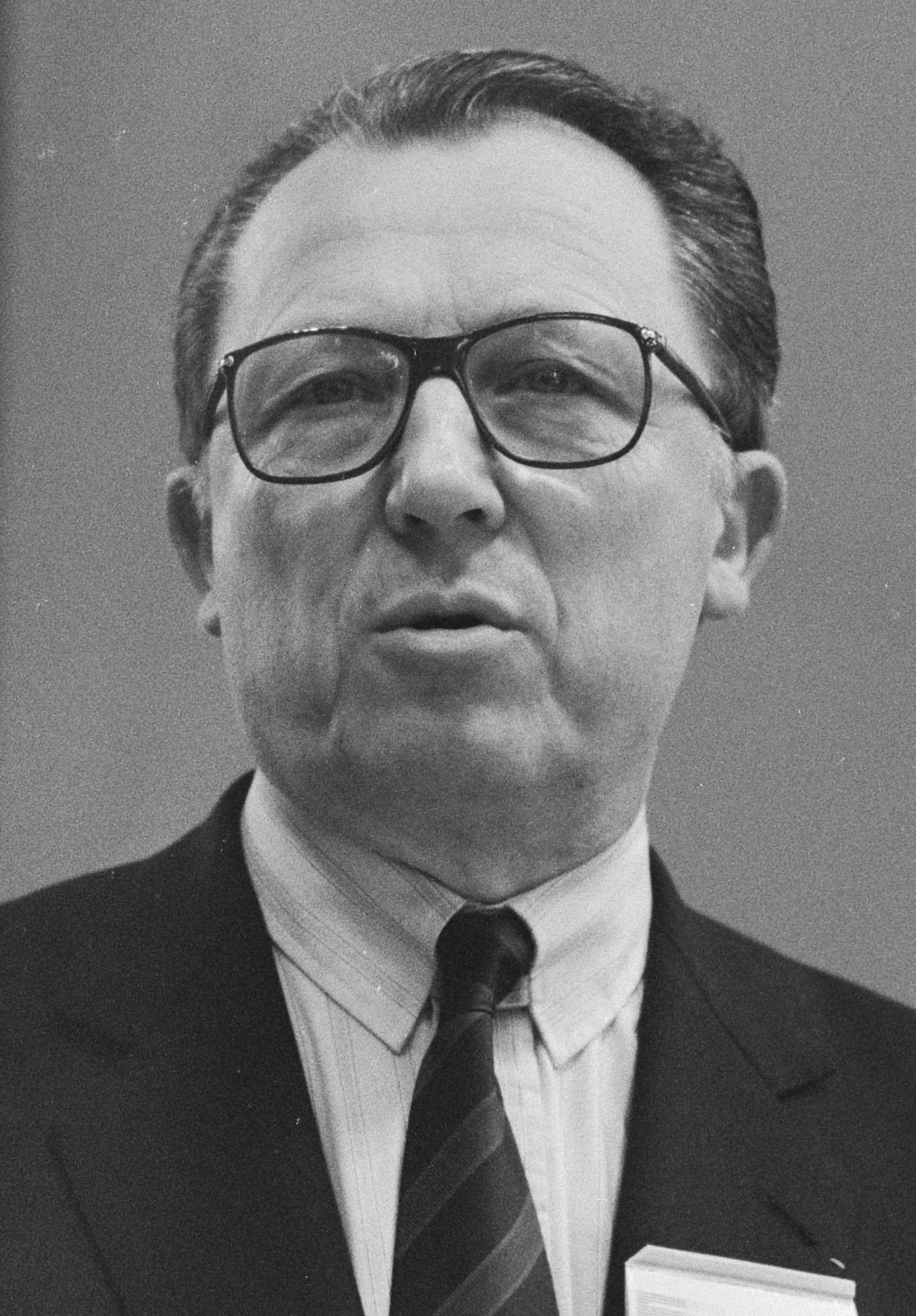
(European Union) European Union
Jacques Delors,
Commission President

== See also ==
- G8
