= 17th G7 summit =

1991 international leader meeting in England

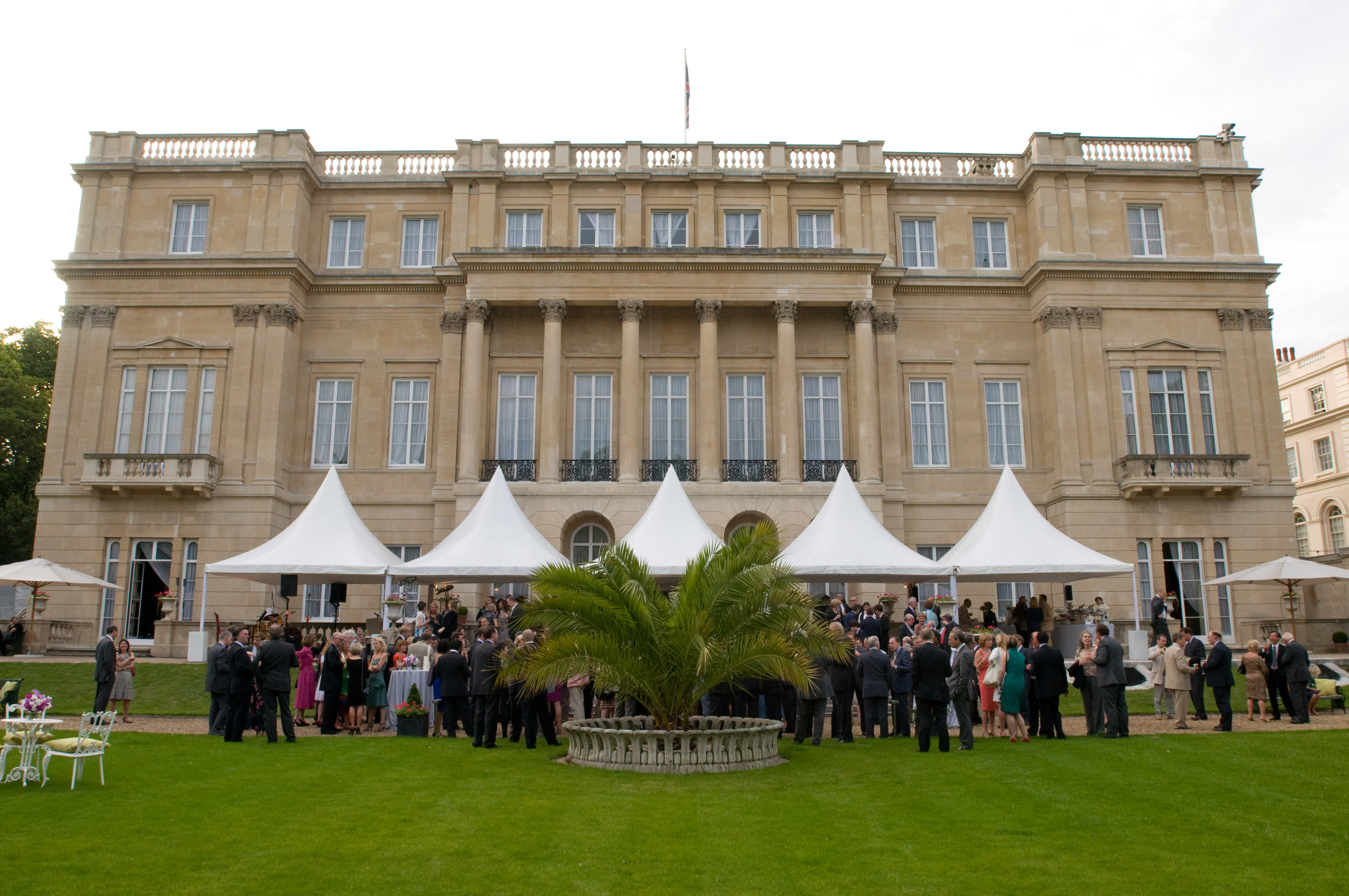
- Lancaster House in London
- Host country: United Kingdom
- Dates: 15–17 July 1991
- Cities: London
- Venues: Lancaster House
- Follows: 16th G7 summit
- Precedes: 18th G7 summit

The 17th G7 Summit was held in England between 15 and 17 July 1991. The venue for the summit meetings was Lancaster House in London.

The Group of Seven (G7) was an unofficial forum which brought together the heads of the richest industrialized countries: France, Germany, Italy, Japan, the United Kingdom, the United States, Canada (since 1976), and the President of the European Commission (starting officially in 1981). The summits were not meant to be linked formally with wider international institutions; and in fact, a mild rebellion against the stiff formality of other international meetings was a part of the genesis of cooperation between France's president Valéry Giscard d'Estaing and West Germany's chancellor Helmut Schmidt as they conceived the first Group of Six (G6) summit in 1975.

== Leaders at the summit ==
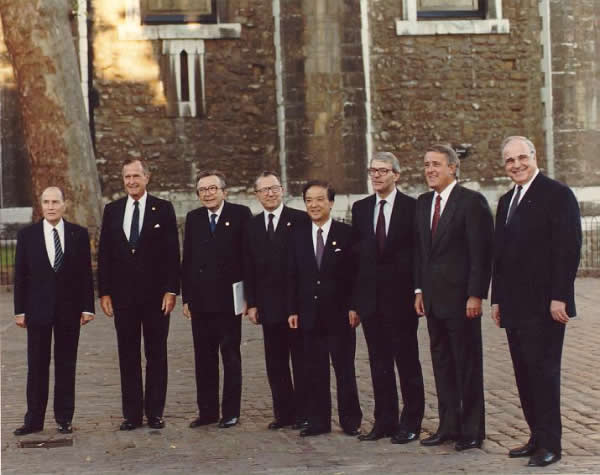
Summit leaders at the Lancaster House: (left to right) François Mitterrand, George H. W. Bush, Giulio Andreotti, Jacques Delors, Toshiki Kaifu, John Major, Brian Mulroney, and Helmut Kohl

The G7 is an unofficial annual forum for the leaders of Canada, the European Commission, France, Germany, Italy, Japan, the United Kingdom, and the United States.

The 17th G7 summit was the first summit for British Prime Minister John Major. It was also the last summit for Italian Prime Minister Giulio Andreotti and Japanese Prime Minister Toshiki Kaifu.

=== Participants ===
These summit participants are the current "core members" of the international forum:

**Core G7 members** Host state and leader are shown in bold text.
Member		Represented by	Title
(Canada)	Canada	Brian Mulroney	Prime Minister
(France)	France	François Mitterrand	President
(Germany)	Germany	Helmut Kohl	Chancellor
(Italy)	Italy	Giulio Andreotti	Prime Minister
(Japan)	Japan	Toshiki Kaifu	Prime Minister
(United Kingdom)	**United Kingdom**	**John Major**	**Prime Minister**
(United States)	United States	George H. W. Bush	President
(European Union)	European Community	Jacques Delors	Commission President
(European Union)	European Community	Ruud Lubbers	Council President
**Guest Invitees (Countries)**
Member		Represented by	Title
(Soviet Union)	Soviet Union	Mikhail Gorbachev	President

Major sent a letter to other members of the G7, asking for their permission to invite Mikhail Gorbachev, who has been pressing to come to London to plead for more Western economic support for his country. Pressure to invite Gorbachev had come mainly from the leaders of France, Germany, and Italy who have made public appeals for him to be invited to attend; but Britain sent the official invitation inviting the Soviet Union to participate. A wry comment which was oft repeated during the summit was that G7 had become the G8½ with the participation of the European Community and the meetings with Gorbachev.

== Issues ==
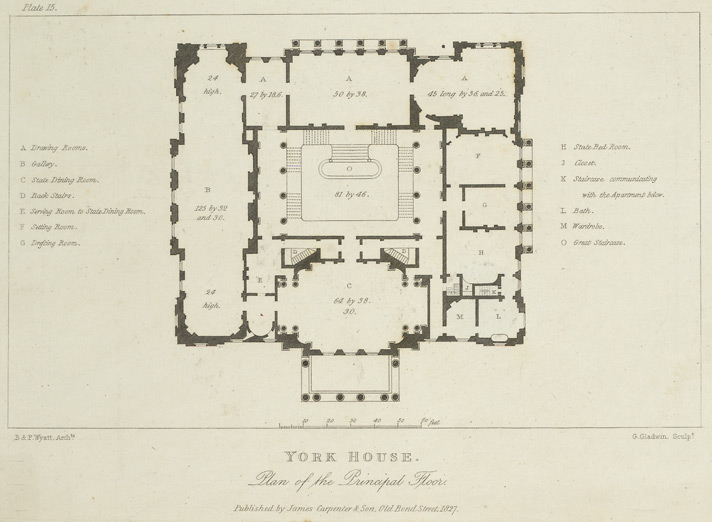
The "grand gallery" runs the length of one side of the building. The 1827 layout of the principal floor is largely unchanged from the initial construction plans.

The summit was intended as a venue for resolving differences among its members. As a practical matter, the summit was also conceived as an opportunity for its members to give each other mutual encouragement in the face of difficult economic decisions. In anticipation of this conference, a new 35-foot-long table was built for the Long Gallery, where the main negotiating sessions were planned to unfold. Issues which were discussed at this summit included:

- Economic Policy
- International Trade
- Energy
- Central and Eastern Europe
- The Soviet Union
- The Middle East
- The Developing Countries and Debt
- Environment
- Drugs
- Migration

== Accomplishments ==
In 1991, the summit leaders proclaimed "concern" about protecting existing forests, but there is little evidence of follow-up action.

== Gallery of participating leaders ==
=== Core G7 participants ===
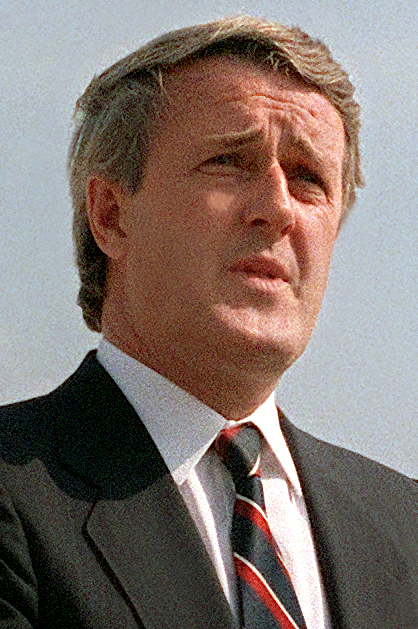
(Canada) Canada
Brian Mulroney,
Prime Minister

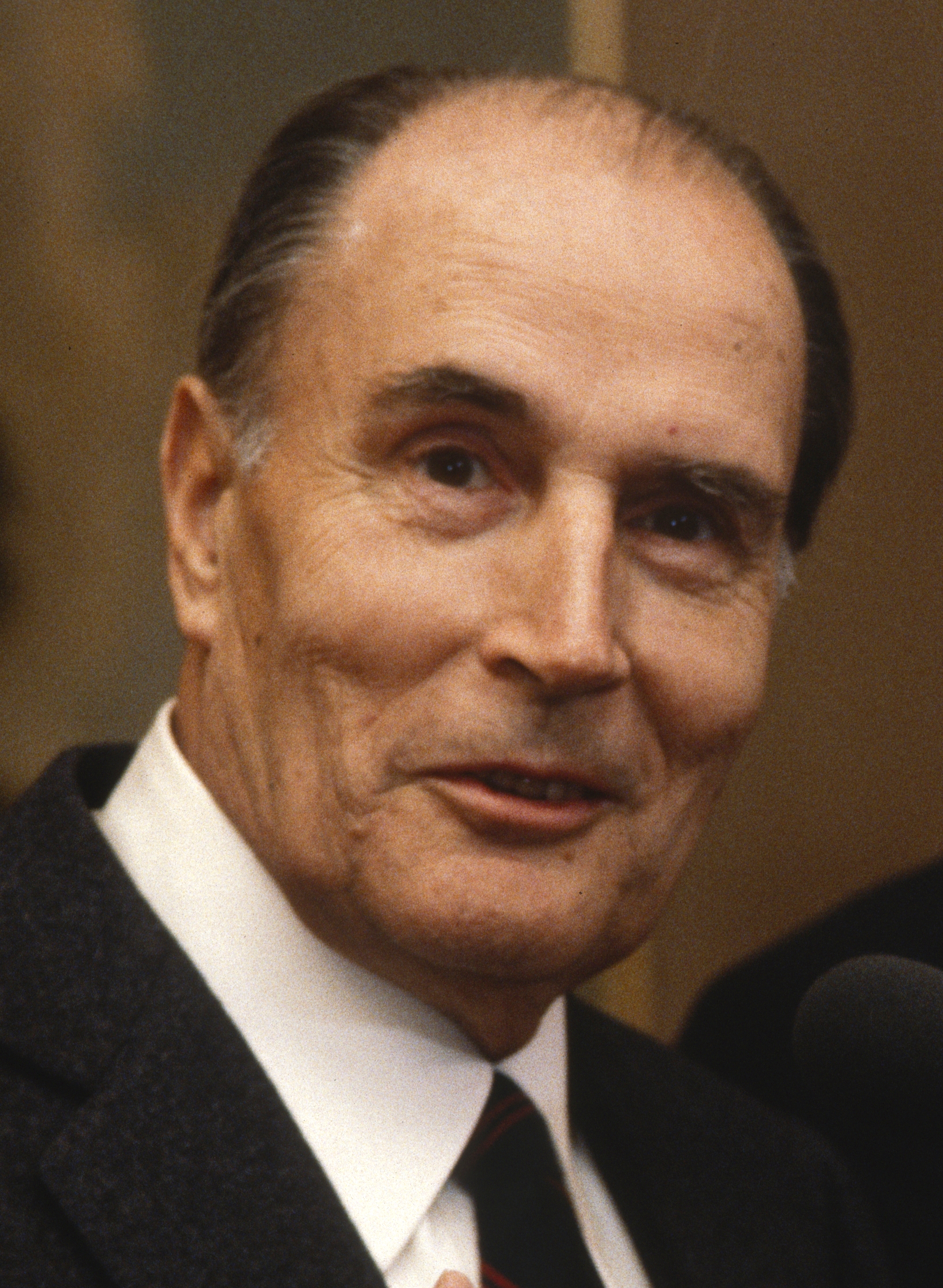
(France) France
François Mitterrand,
President

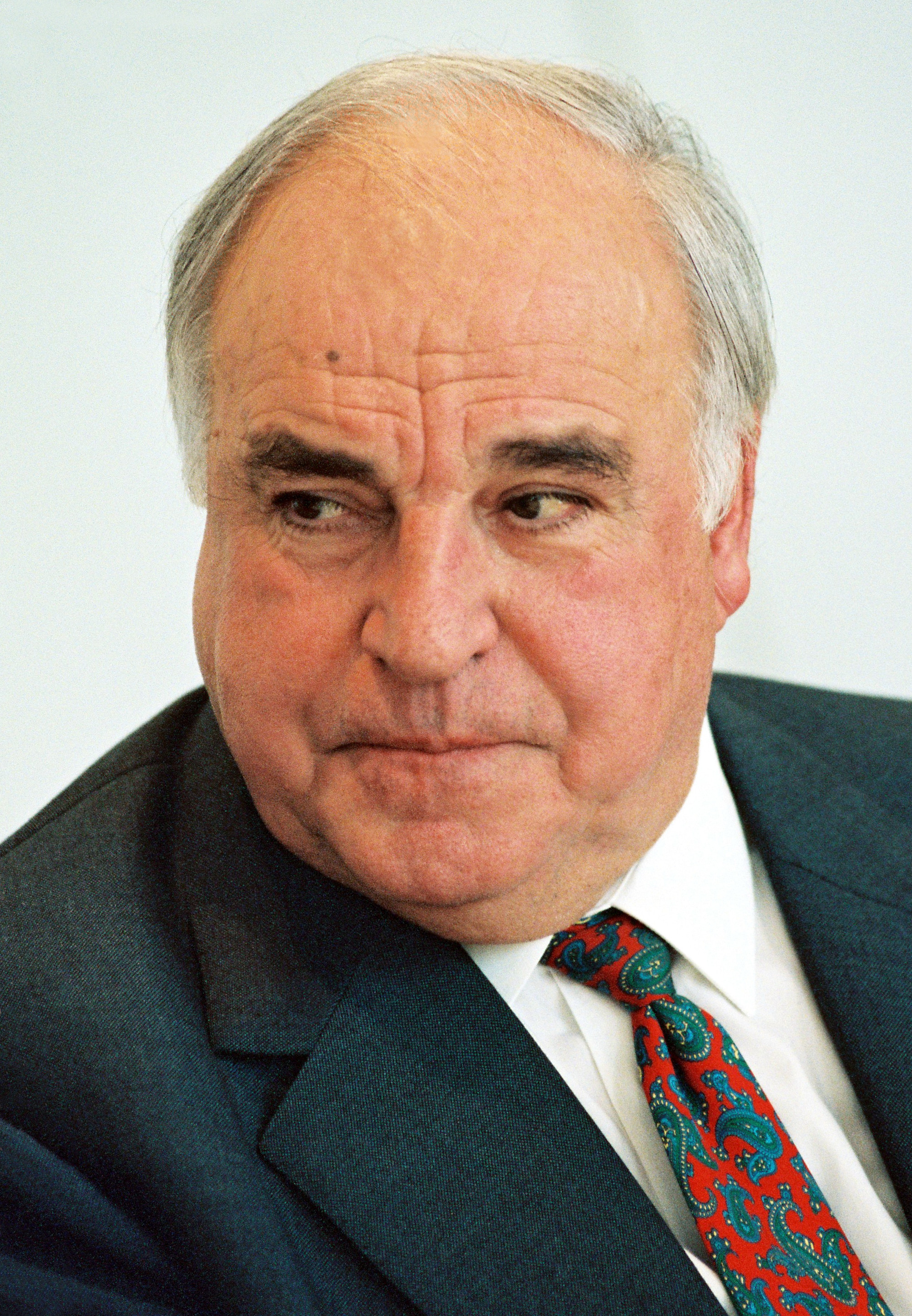
(Germany) Germany
Helmut Kohl,
Chancellor

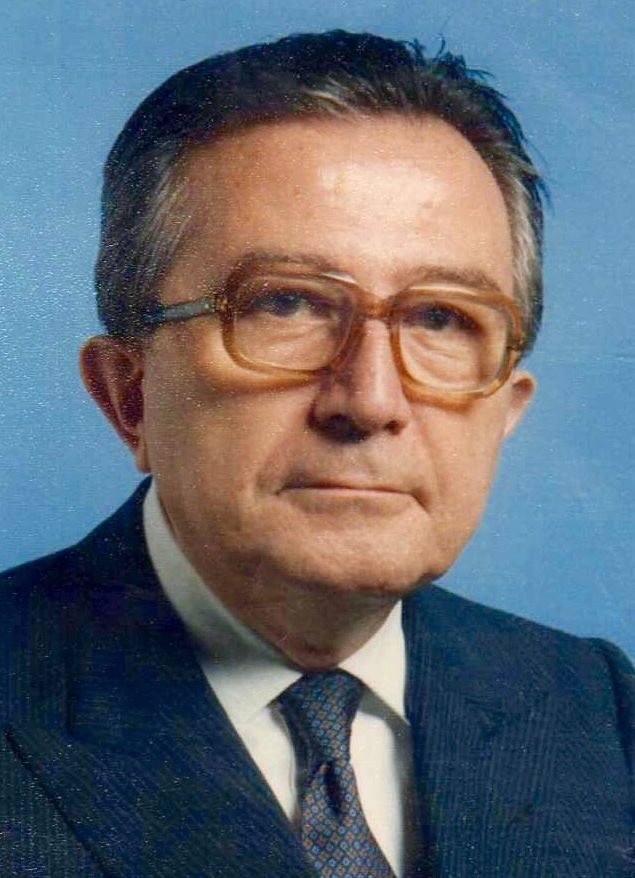
(Italy) Italy
Giulio Andreotti,
Prime Minister

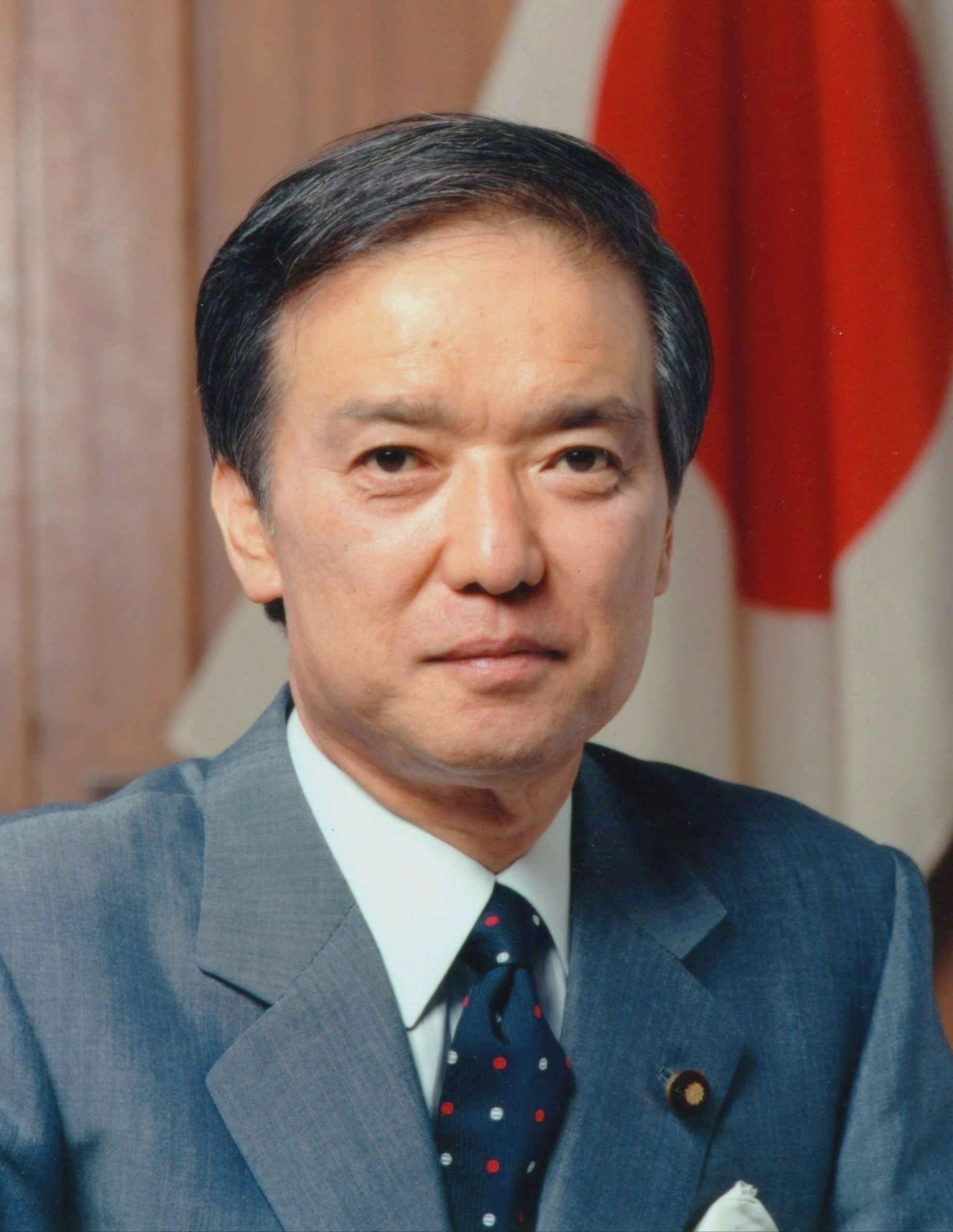
(Japan) Japan
Toshiki Kaifu,
Prime Minister

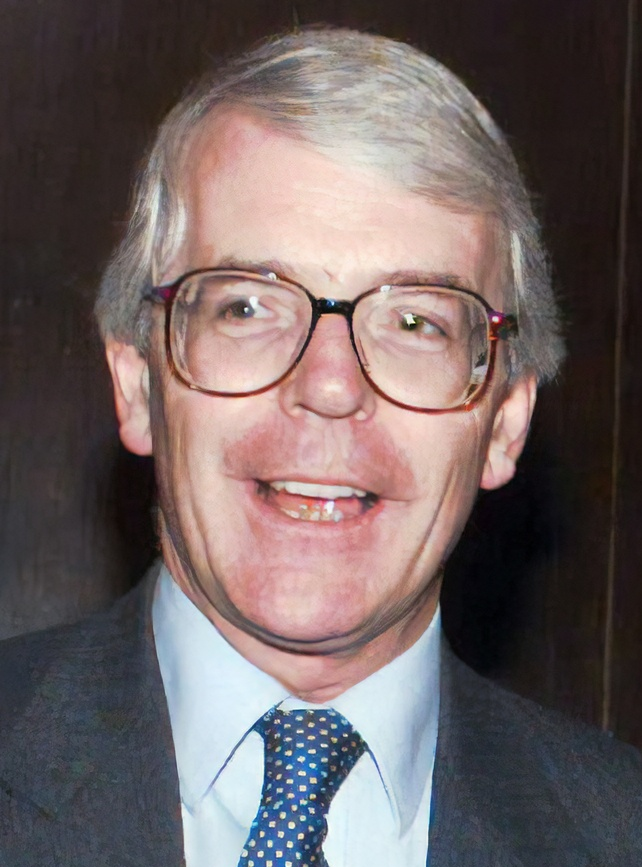
(United Kingdom) United Kingdom
John Major,
Prime Minister (Host)

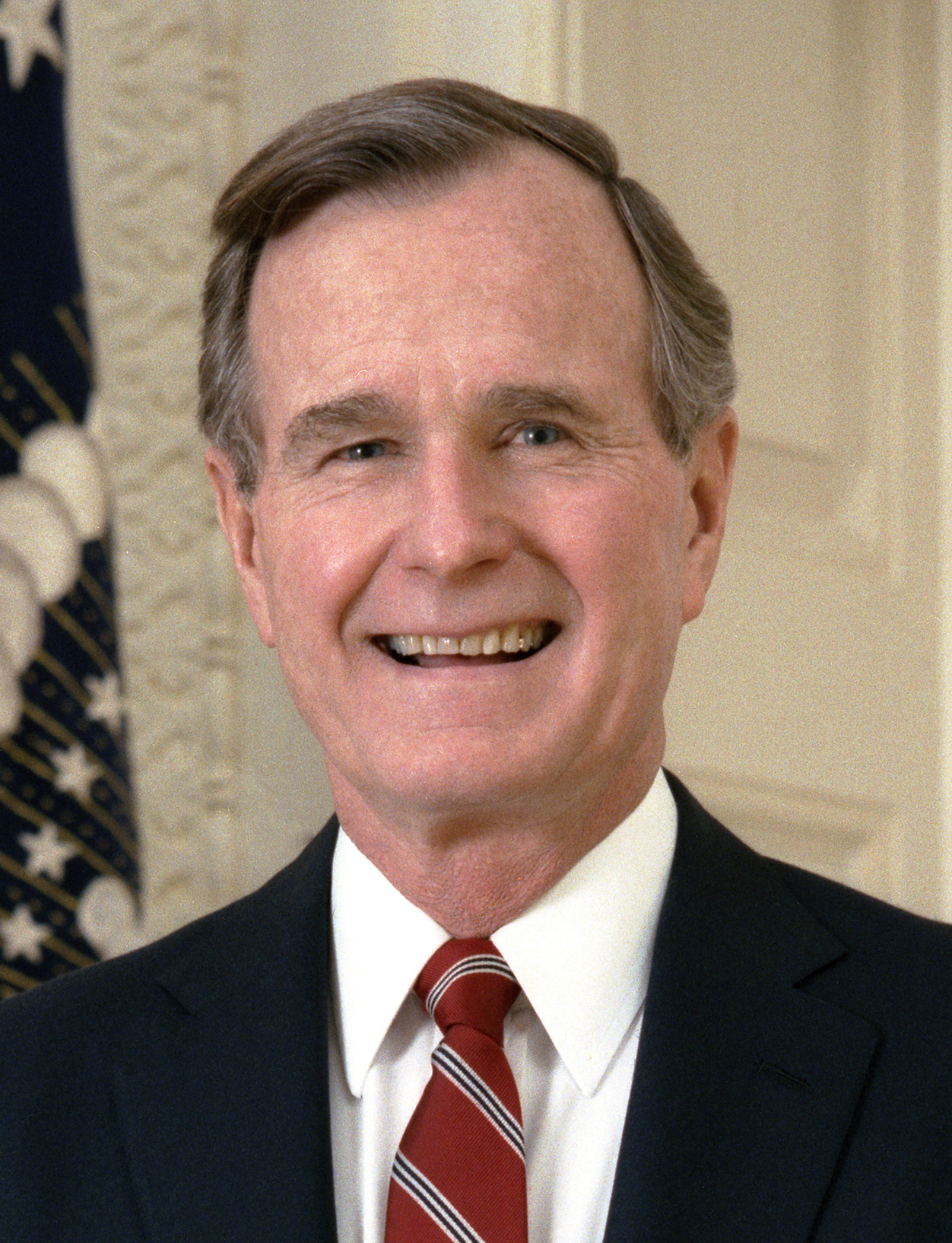
(United States) United States
George H. W. Bush,
President
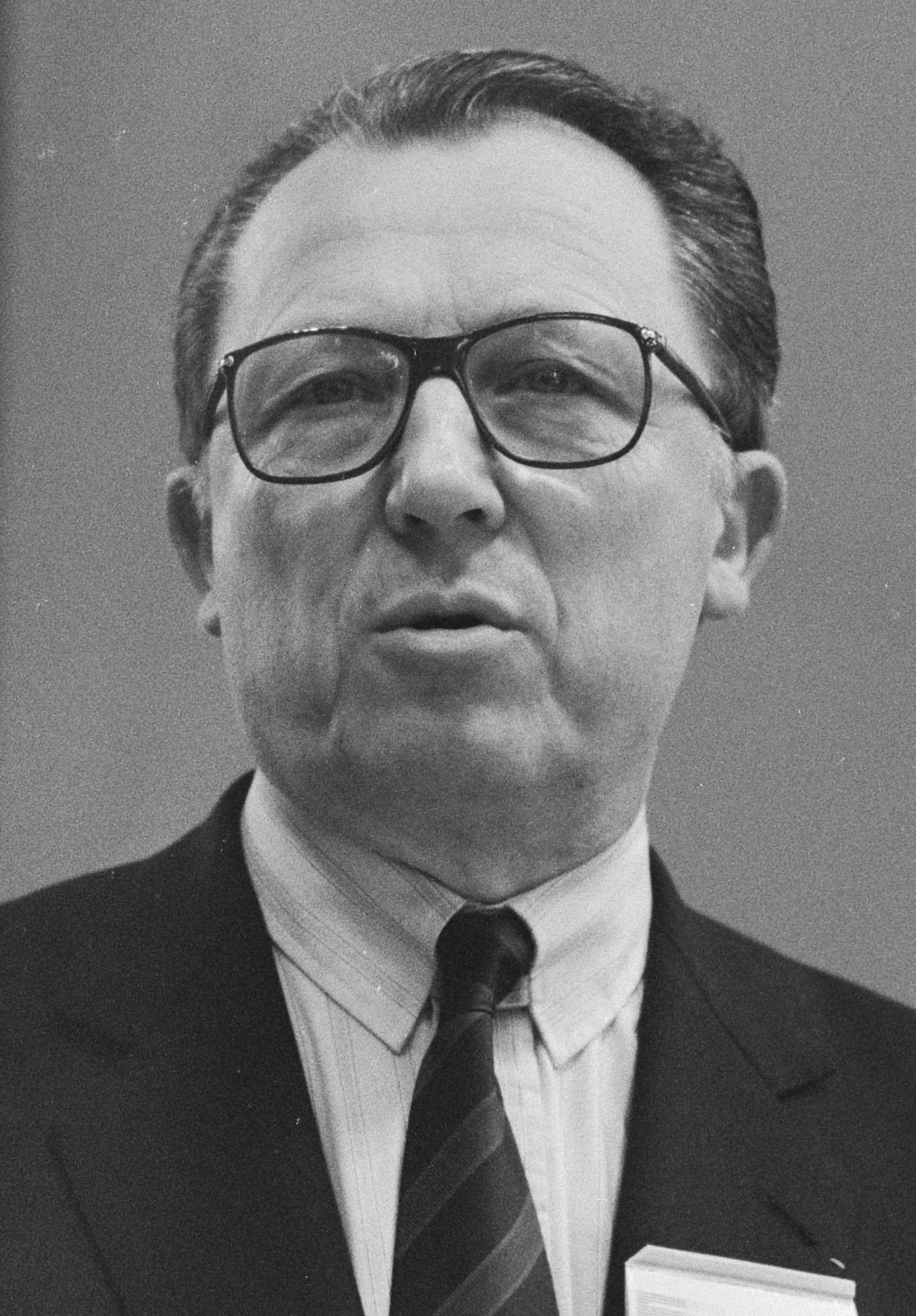
(European Union) European Union
Jacques Delors,
Commission President

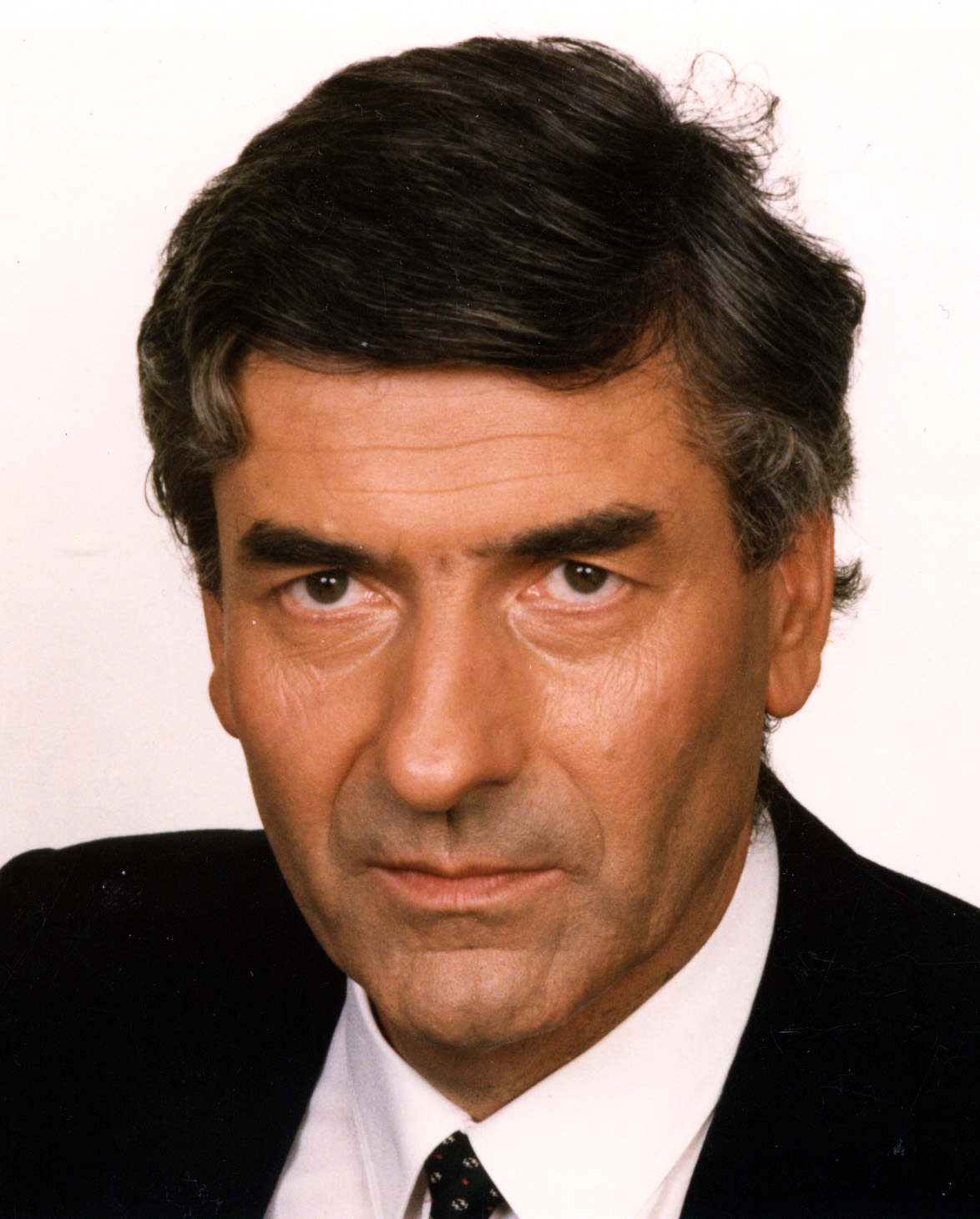
(European Union) European Union
Ruud Lubbers,
Council President

=== Guest Invitees ===
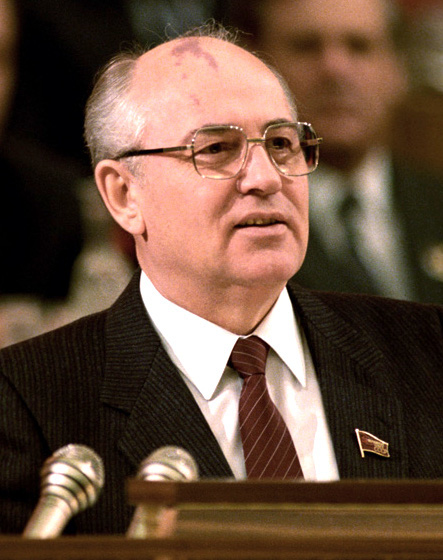
(Soviet Union) Soviet Union
Mikhail Gorbachev, President

== See also ==
- G8
- List of Soviet Union–United States summits
