= 18th G7 summit =

1992 international leader meeting in Germany

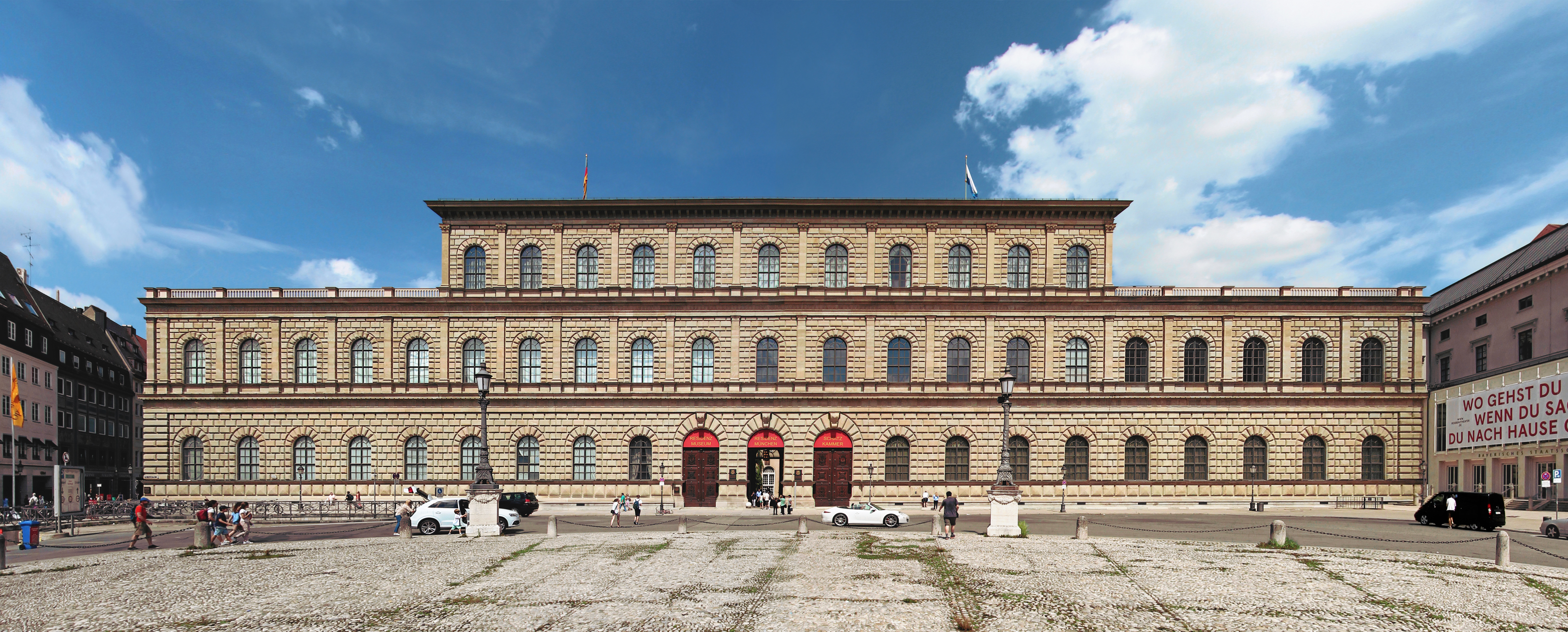
- Wittelsbach palace in Munich, the Residenz
- Host country: Germany
- Dates: 6–8 July 1992
- Cities: Munich
- Venues: Residenz
- Follows: 17th G7 summit
- Precedes: 19th G7 summit

The 18th G7 Summit was held in Munich, Germany between 6 and 8 July 1992. The venue for the summit meetings was at the Residenz palace in central Munich.

The Group of Seven (G7) was an unofficial forum which brought together the heads of the richest industrialized countries: France, Germany, Italy, Japan, the United Kingdom, the United States, Canada (since 1976), and the President of the European Commission (starting officially in 1981). The summits were not meant to be linked formally with wider international institutions; and in fact, a mild rebellion against the stiff formality of other international meetings was a part of the genesis of cooperation between France's president Valéry Giscard d'Estaing and West Germany's chancellor Helmut Schmidt as they conceived the first Group of Six (G6) summit in 1975.

== Leaders at the summit ==
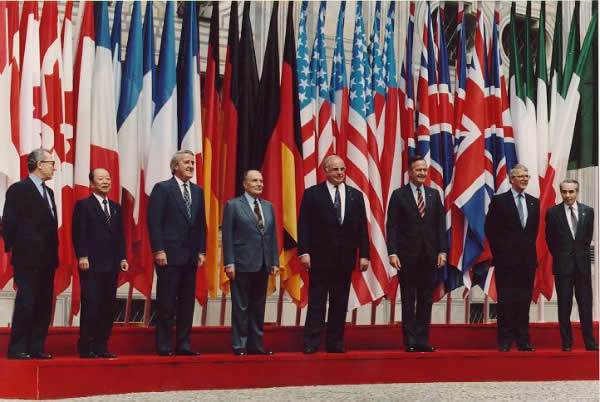
Summit leaders at the Munich Residenz: (left to right) Jacques Delors, Kiichi Miyazawa, Brian Mulroney, François Mitterrand, Helmut Kohl, George H. W. Bush, John Major, and Giuliano Amato

The G7 is an unofficial annual forum for the leaders of Canada, the European Commission, France, Germany, Italy, Japan, the United Kingdom, and the United States.

The 18th G7 summit was the first summit for Italian Prime Minister Giuliano Amato and Japanese Prime Minister Kiichi Miyazawa. It was also the last summit for Canadian Prime Minister Brian Mulroney and US President George H. W. Bush.

=== Participants ===
These summit participants are the current "core members" of the international forum:

**Core G7 members** Host state and leader are shown in bold text.
Member		Represented by	Title
(Canada)	Canada	Brian Mulroney	Prime Minister
(France)	France	François Mitterrand	President
(Germany)	**Germany**	**Helmut Kohl**	**Chancellor**
(Italy)	Italy	Giuliano Amato	Prime Minister
(Japan)	Japan	Kiichi Miyazawa	Prime Minister
(United Kingdom)	United Kingdom	John Major	Prime Minister
(United States)	United States	George H. W. Bush	President
(European Union)	European Community	Jacques Delors	Commission President
(European Union)	European Community	John Major	Council President

== Issues ==
The summit was intended as a venue for resolving differences among its members. As a practical matter, the summit was also conceived as an opportunity for its members to give each other mutual encouragement in the face of difficult economic decisions. Issues which were discussed at this summit included:

- World Economy
- United Nations Conference on Environment and Development(UNCED)
- Developing Countries
- Central and Eastern Europe
- New Independent States of the Former Soviet Union
- Safety of Nuclear Power Plants in the New Independent States of the Former Soviet Union and in Central and Eastern Europe

== Gallery of participating leaders ==
=== Core G7 participants ===
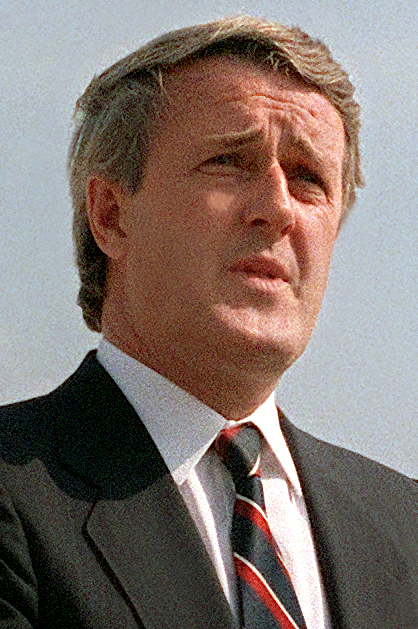
(Canada) Canada
Brian Mulroney,
Prime Minister

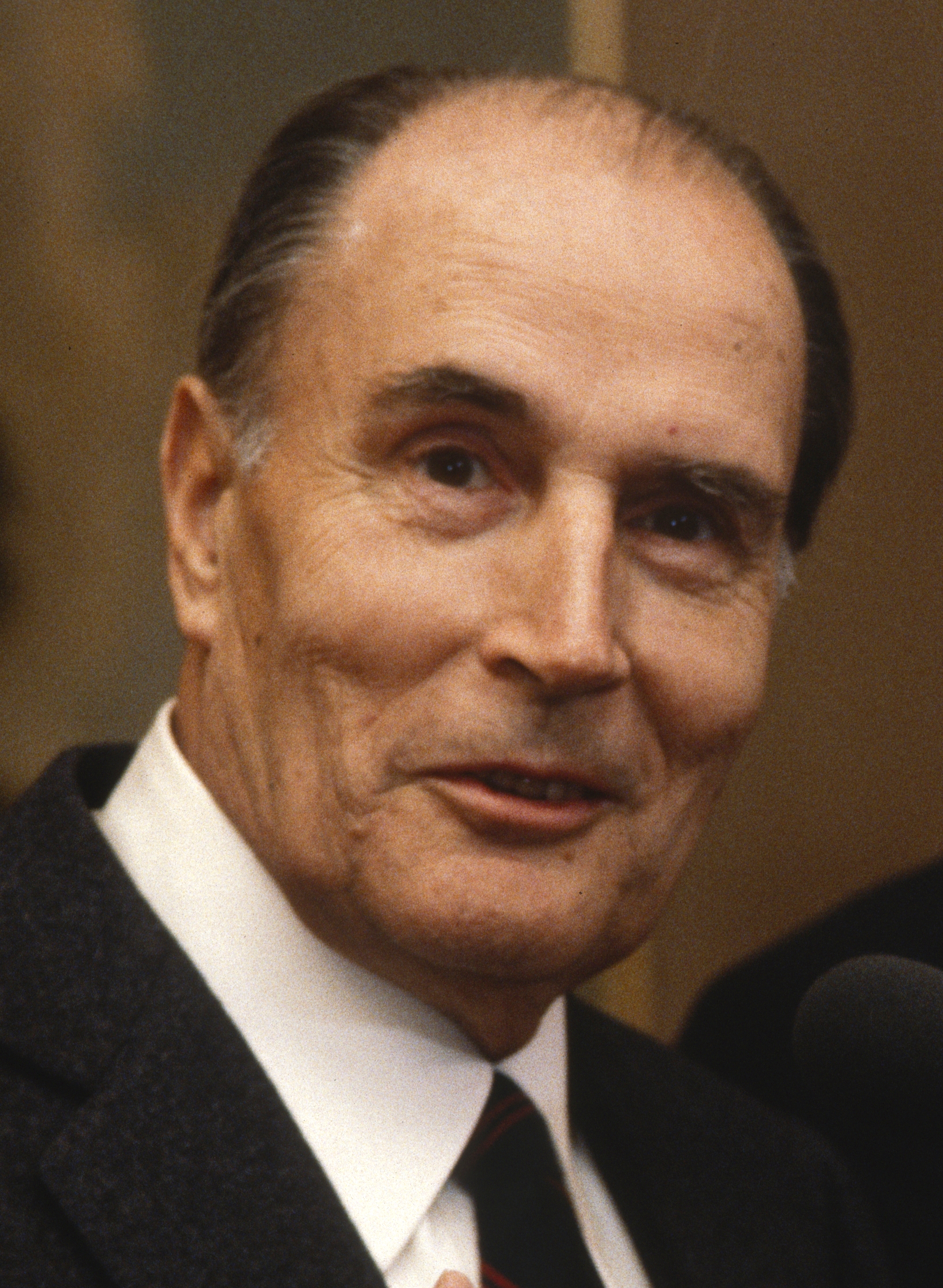
(France) France
François Mitterrand,
President

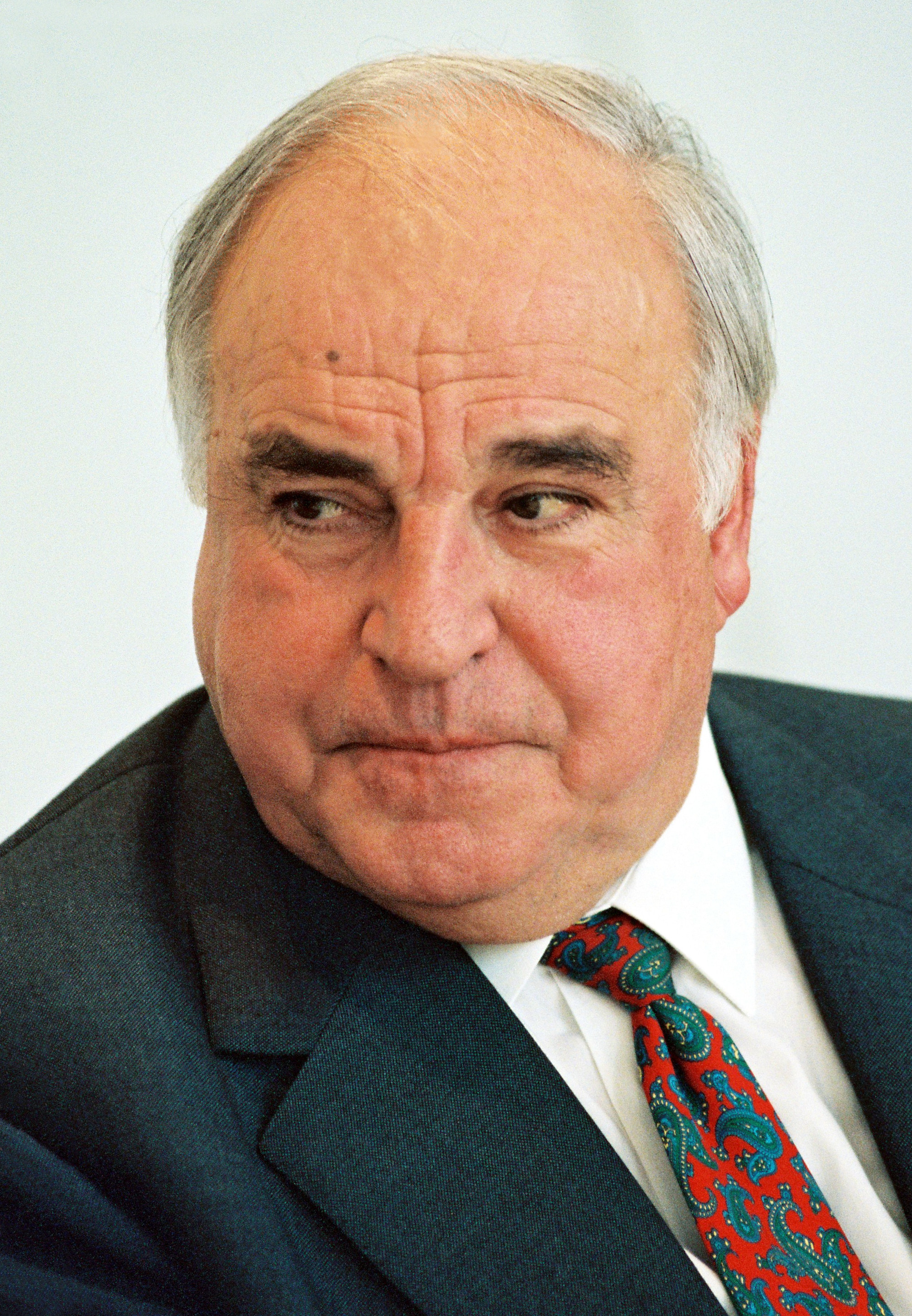
(Germany) Germany
Helmut Kohl,
Chancellor (Host)

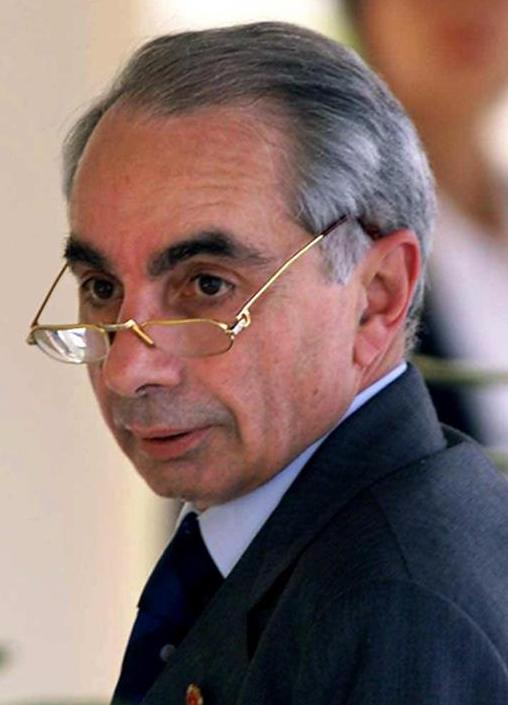
(Italy) Italy
Giuliano Amato,
Prime Minister

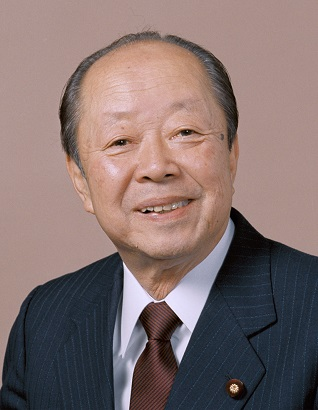
(Japan) Japan
Kiichi Miyazawa,
Prime Minister

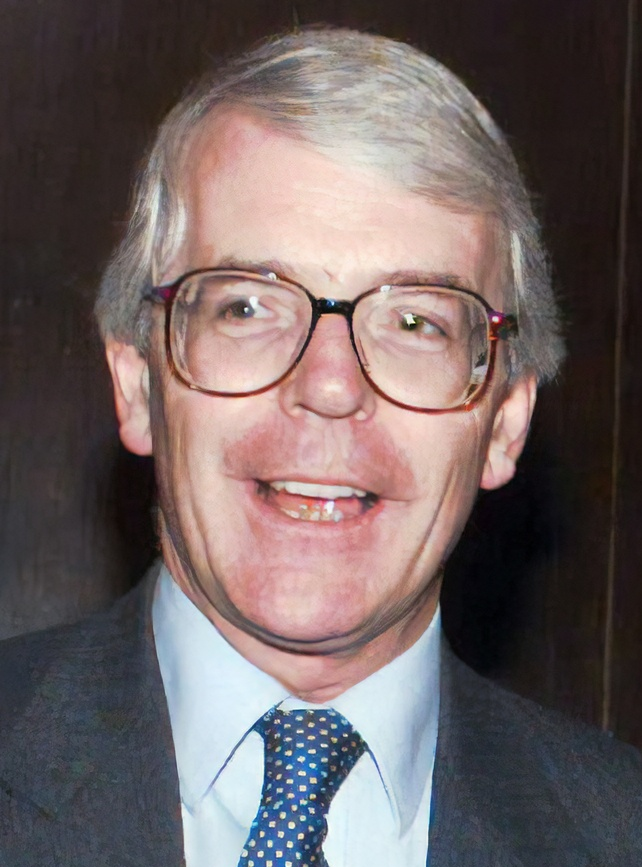
(United Kingdom) United Kingdom
John Major,
Prime Minister

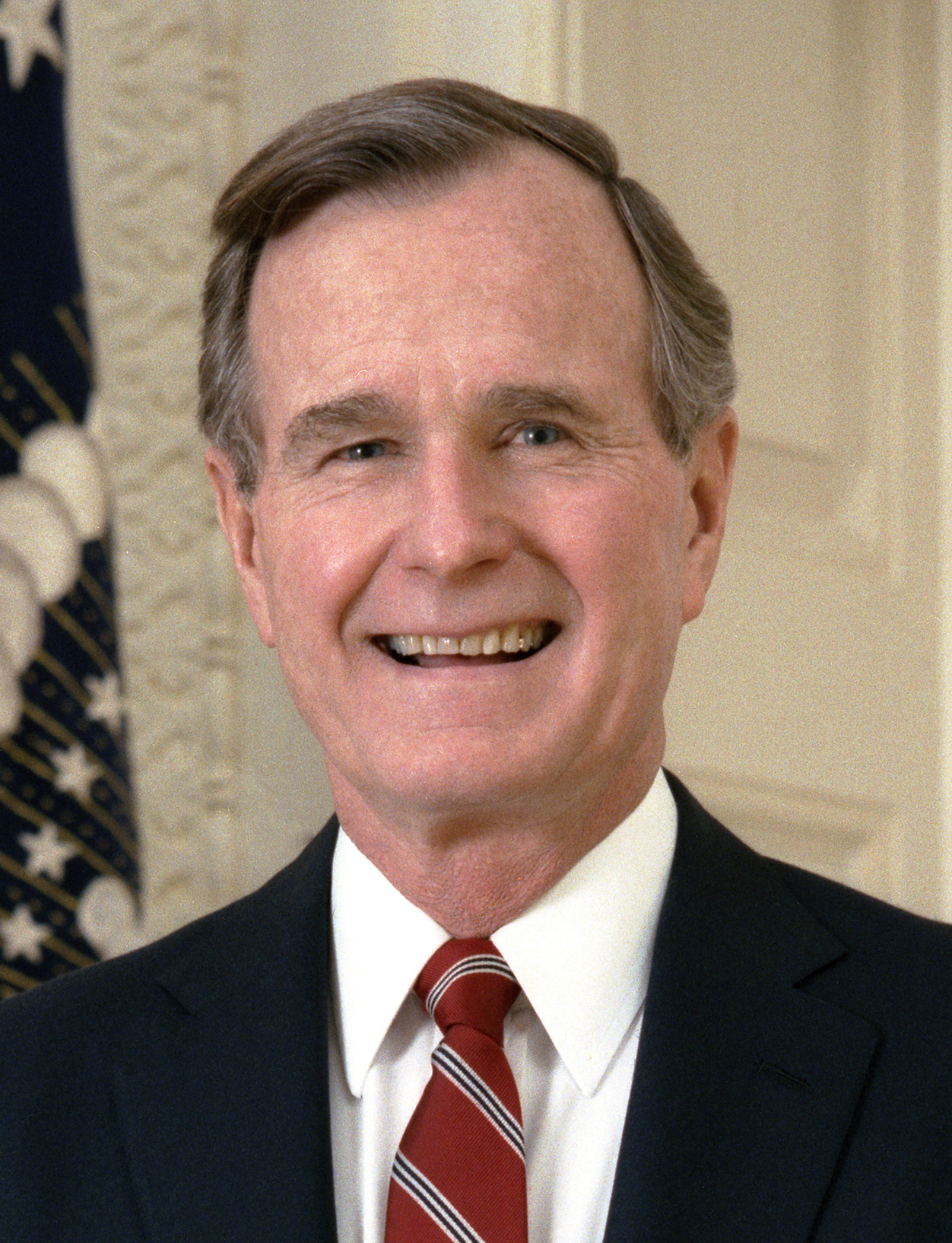
(United States) United States
George H. W. Bush,
President
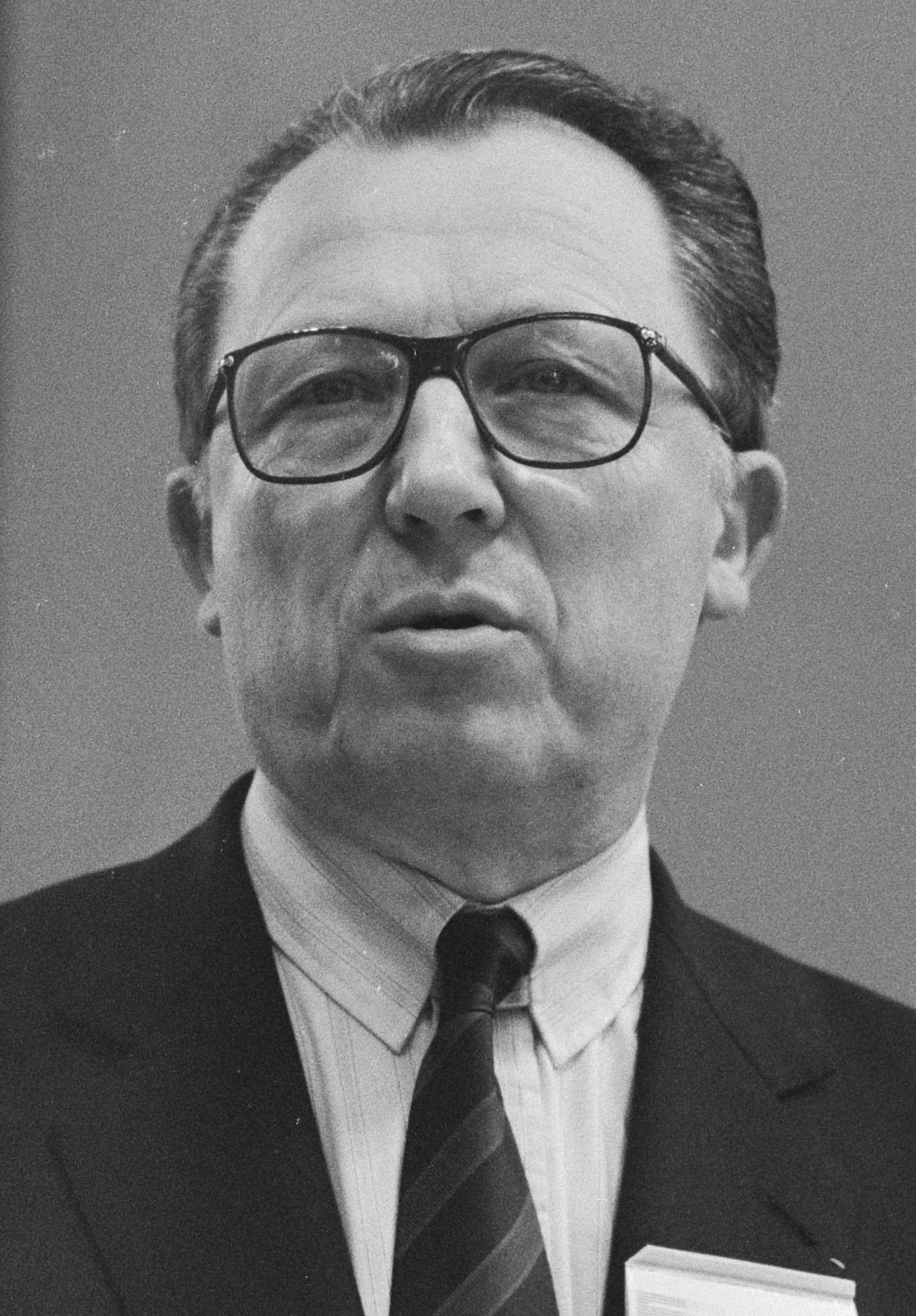
(European Union) European Union
Jacques Delors,
Commission President

== See also ==
- G8
