= Daring =

Daring can mean:

== Ships ==
- Daring-class destroyer (disambiguation), three classes of destroyer
- HMS Daring, seven vessels of the British Royal Navy
- USS Daring (AM-87), a World War II minesweeper
- SS Wallsend (1943), a cargo ship later renamed Daring
- Daring (steamboat 1909)
- Daring (keelboat), a class of keelboat raced in Cowes
- Daring (schooner), a cargo vessel wrecked and recovered in New Zealand

== Arts and entertainment ==
- Chris Daring, American country music fiddler
- Daring, surname of the main characters in The Replacements
- Daring Do, a character in My Little Pony: Friendship is Magic
- the title character of the Lieutenant Daring silent film series (also one talkie)
- Phoebe and Philip Daring, twin orphans in The Daring Twins and Phoebe Daring, mystery novels by L. Frank Baum

== Other uses ==
- Daring Club Motema Pembe, Congolese football club based in Kinshasa
- Daring, Nancowry, a village in Andaman and Nicobar Islands of India
