= Palacios (surname) =

Palacios is a Spanish surname meaning palace. It is the plural form of the habitational surname Palacio. Notable people with the name include:

- Abel Iturralde Palacios (1869–1935), Foreign Minister of Bolivia
- Adrián Palacios (born 2004), Venezuelan footballer
- Alfredo Palacios (1880–1965), Argentine politician
- Antonia Palacios (1904–2001), Venezuelan writer
- Antonio Palacios (1874–1945), Spanish architect
- Antonio Palacios Lanza (born 1952), Venezuelan chess master
- Antonio José Martínez Palacios (1902–1936), Spanish composer
- Arnold Palacios (1955–2025), 10th Governor of the Northern Mariana Islands.
- Augusto Pérez Palacios (1909–2002), Mexican architect
- Bárbara Palacios (born 1963), Venezuelan entrepreneur, Miss Universe 1986
- César Palacios (born 2004), Spanish footballer
- Claudia Palacios (born 1977), Colombian journalist and newscaster
- Eloy Palacios (1847–1919), Venezuelan sculptor
- Emilio Palacios (born 1982), Nicaraguan footballer
- Ernesto Palacios de la Prida (1943–2000), Spanish chess master
- Exequiel Palacios (born 1998), Argentine footballer
- Felipa Palacios (born 1975), Colombian track and field athlete
- Fermín Palacios, 19th-century president of El Salvador
- Helibelton Palacios (born 1993), Colombian footballer
- Isabel Palacios (born 1950), Venezuelan musician and wife of José Ignacio Cabrujas
- Isabel Palacios (scientist), winner of a 2019 Suffrage Science award
- Josh Palacios (born 1995), American baseball player
- Juan Palacios (disambiguation)
  - Juan Palacios (basketball) (born 1985), Colombian basketball player
  - Juan Palacios (boxer) (born 1980), Nicaraguan boxer
  - Juan Palacios (cyclist) (born 1962), Ecuadorian cyclist
  - Juan José Palacios (1944–2002), Spanish musician and record producer
- Karen Palacios, Venezuelan clarinetist
- Lucila Palacios (1902–1994), Venezuelan poet
- Luis Esteban Palacios, Venezuelan Chairman of the Inter-American Scout Committee
- Marco Antonio Palacios (born 1981), Mexican football player, also known as Pikolin
- Marcos Palacios (fl. 2000s–2010s), American music producer
- Miguel Asín Palacios (1871–1944), Spanish scholar and Roman Catholic priest who published Islam and the Divine Comedy in 1919
- Monica Palacios (playwright), Chicana lesbian American playwright and performer
- Mónica Palacios (politician), Ecuadorian politician
- Nicolás Palacios (1854–1931), Chilean physician and writer, best known for his racial ideas
- Odón Betanzos Palacios (1925–2007), Spanish writer
- Rafael Palacios (priest) (died 1979), Roman Catholic El Salvadoran priest
- Rafael Palacios (artist) (1905–1993), Puerto Rican-American artist and map-drawer
- Raimundo Andueza Palacios, a 19th-century president of Venezuela
- Rey Palacios (born 1962), American former baseball player
- Richie Palacios (born 1997), American baseball player
- Roberto Palacios (born 1972), Peruvian football player
- Santiago Palacios (born 1991), Mexican football (soccer) player
- Sebastián Palacios (born 1992), Argentine footballer
- Sheynnis Palacios (born 2000), Nicaraguan model, beauty pageant titleholder and Miss Universe 2023 titleholder
- Steve Palacios (born 1993), American soccer player
- Tatiana (singer) (born 1968), Mexican singer and actress known as Tatiana
- Tiago Palacios (born 2001), footballer, born in Argentina, he represents Uruguay at international level
- Tomás Palacios (born 2003), Argentine footballer
- Victoria Palacios (born 1977), Mexican race walker
- Wilson Palacios (born 1984), Honduran football player

== See also ==
- Palacios (disambiguation)
