= List of international presidential trips made by Boris Yeltsin =

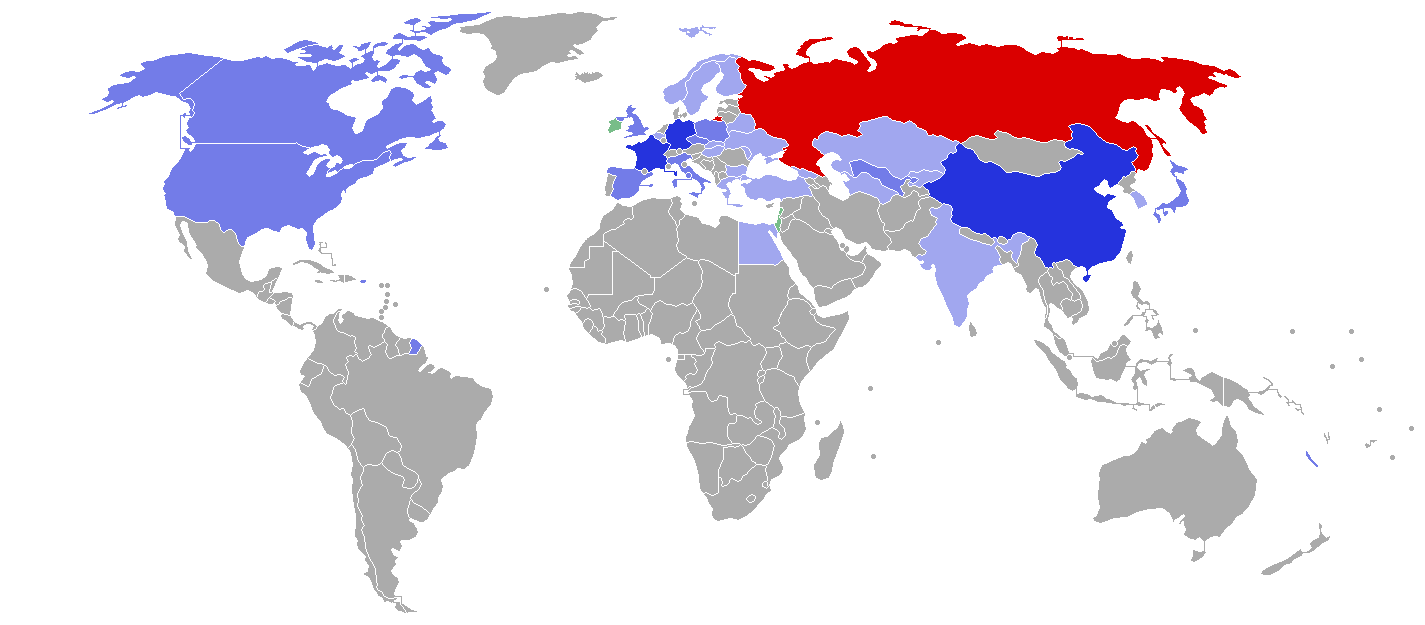
World map highlighting countries visited by Boris Yeltsin during his presidency. One visit Two visits Three visits Four visits Russia

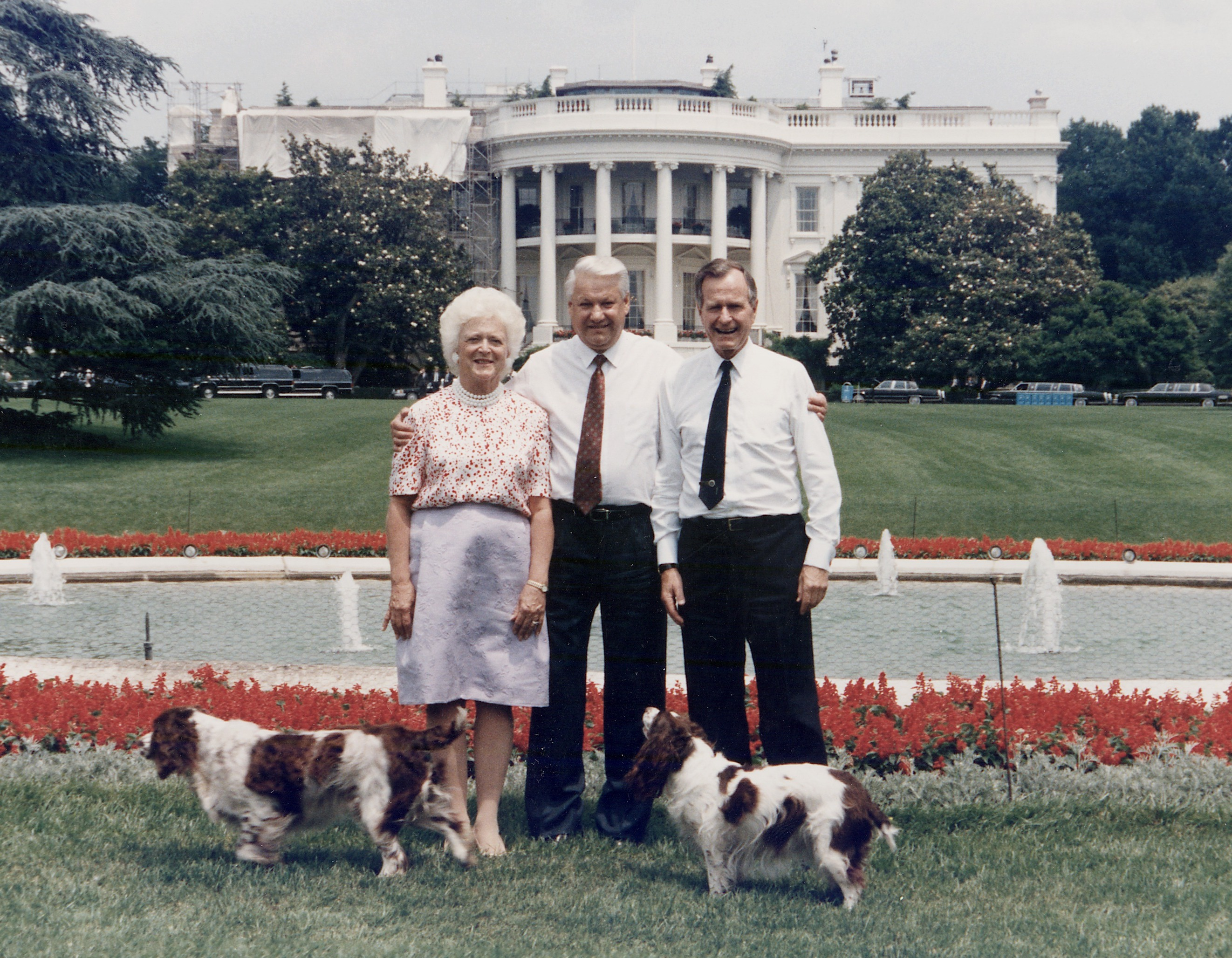
Yeltsin with George Bush at the White House, Washington, DC in 1992

This is a list of Boris Yeltsin's presidential trips during his presidency, which began with his appointment on 10 July 1991. He travelled to 50 countries internationally, in addition to many more trips made domestically.

== First term as president ==
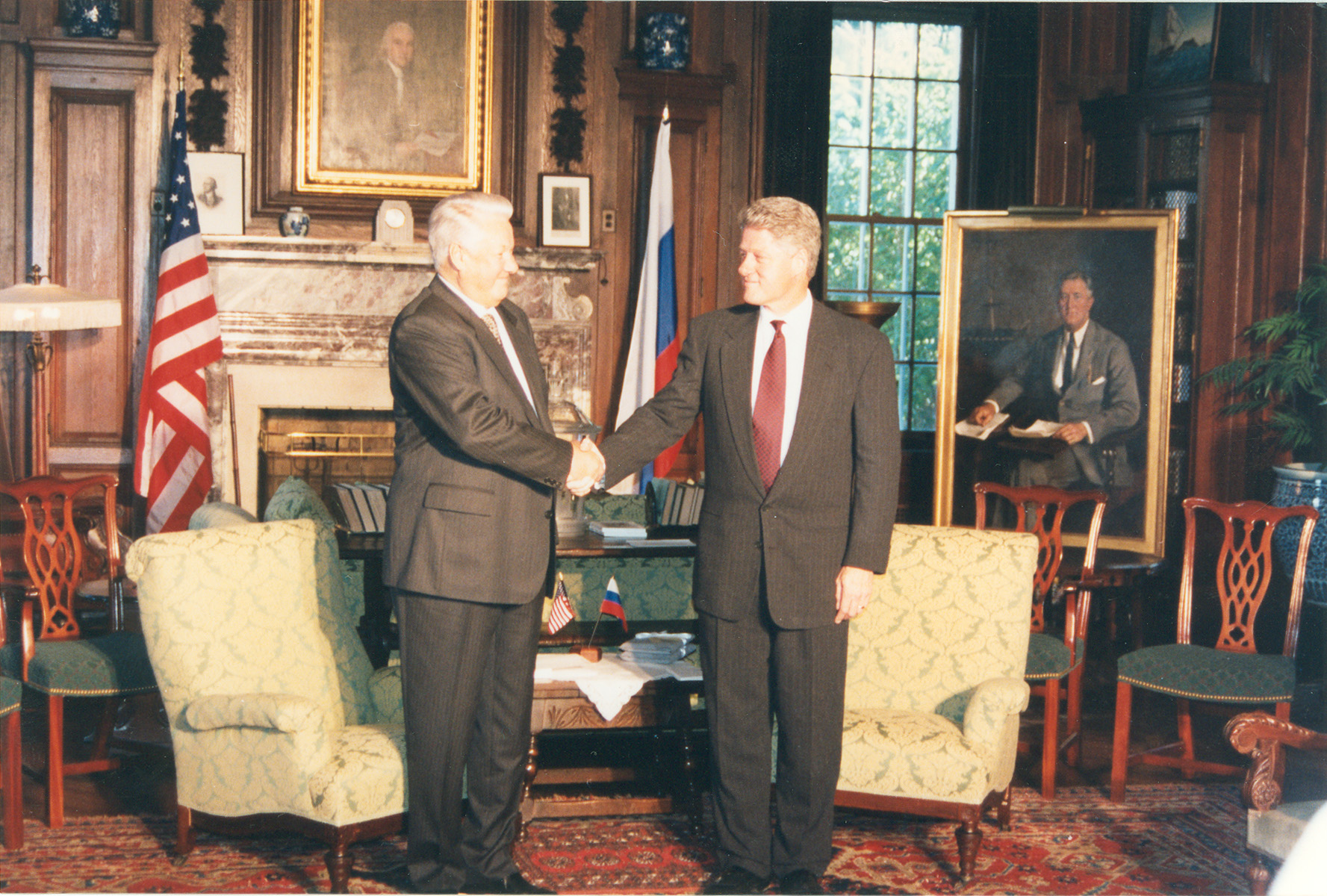
Bill Clinton with Yeltsin during a meeting at the home of Franklin D. Roosevelt on 23 October 1995

=== 1991–1996 ===
| Date(s) | Country | Locations | Description |
|---|---|---|---|
| 1991 | Germany | Bonn | |
| 1991 | Kazakhstan | Alma-Ata | State visit. |
| 1991 | Vatican City | Vatican City | State visit. |
| 1991 | France | Paris | State visit. |
| 1991 | Germany | Bonn | |
| 1992 | United States | Washington DC | |
| 1992 | United Kingdom | London | |
| 1992 | Uzbekistan | Samarkand | State visit. |
| 1992 | South Korea | Seoul | State visit. |
| 1992 | France | Paris | |
| 1992 | Canada | Ottawa, Montreal | |
| 1992 | Bulgaria | Sofia | |
| 1992 | China | Beijing | |
| 1993 | Greece | Athens | |
| 1993 | Turkmenistan | Ashgabat | State visit. |
| 1993 | Belgium | Brussels | |
| 1993 | India | Delhi | State visit. |
| 1993 | Belarus | Minsk | CIS Summit |
| 1993 | Poland | Warsaw | |
| 1993 | Czech Republic | Prague | |
| 1993 | Slovakia | Bratislava | |
| 1993 | Japan | Tokyo | |
| 1994 | Spain | Barcelona | |
| 1994 | Greece | Corfu | |
| 1994 | United Kingdom | London | |
| 1994 | Spain | Madrid | |
| 1994 | Georgia | Tbilisi | State visit. |
| 1994 | Germany | Stuttgart | Participation in the parting ceremony of the Group of Soviet Forces in Germany. |
| 1994 | United States | Washington D.C. | |
| 30 September 1994 | Ireland (Shannon incident) | Dublin | Yeltsin was scheduled for an official state visit to Ireland but failed to get off his plane when it landed at Shannon Airport. The incident embarrassed the Irish government, in particular Taoiseach Albert Reynolds, who was left standing at the foot of the stairs to Yeltsin's plane, and raised questions about Yeltsin's health and fitness to serve. |
| 1995 | Belarus | Minsk | |
| 1995 | Kazakhstan | Alma-Ata | CIS Summit |
| 1995 | Belarus | Minsk | CIS Summit |
| 1995 | United States | Washington D.C. | Participation in the 50th session of the UN General Assembly. |

== Second term as president ==
=== 1996–1999 ===
| Date(s) | Country | Locations | Description |
|---|---|---|---|
| 1996 | Belarus | Brest | Participation in the 55th anniversary of the start of the Great Patriotic War. |
| 1996 | China | Beijing | |
| 1996 | Norway | Oslo | |
| 1997 | Germany | Baden-Baden | |
| 1997 | China | Beijing | |
| 1997 | Ukraine | Kyiv | |
| 1997 | United States | Denver | G8 Summit |
| 1997 | Moldova | Chișinău | CIS Summit |
| 1997 | Sweden | Stockholm | |
| 1998 | Italy | Rome | |
| 1998 | Vatican City | Vatican City | |
| 1998 | Japan | Kanagawa | |
| 1998 | United Kingdom | Birmingham | G8 Summit |
| 1998 | Germany | Bonn | |
| 1998 | Uzbekistan | Tashkent | State visit. |
| 1999 | Germany | Cologne | G8 Summit |
| 1999 | Turkey | Istanbul | OSCE Summit |
| 1999 | China | Beijing | State visit. |

== See also ==
- List of international presidential trips made by Dmitry Medvedev
- List of international presidential trips made by Vladimir Putin
- List of international trips made by Mikhail Gorbachev
