= BAP Palacios =

BAP Palacios is the name of the following ships of the Peruvian Navy:

- BAP Palacios (F-2), ex-HMCS St. Pierre, a River-class frigate in service with Peru 1947–1966
- BAP Palacios (DM-73), ex-HMS Diana (D126), a Daring-class destroyer in service with Peru 1973–1993
- BAP Palacios (FM-56), ex-Lupo, commissioned in 2004

== See also ==
- Palacios (disambiguation)
