= Palacios =

Palacios may refer to:

- Palacios (surname)
- Palacios, Texas
- Los Palacios, Cuba
- BAP Palacios, ships of the Peruvian Navy

== See also ==
- Palacio, a surname
