= Juan Palacios =

Juan Palacios may refer to:

- Juan Palacios (basketball) (born 1985), Colombian basketball player
- Juan Palacios (boxer) (born 1980), Nicaraguan boxer
- Juan Palacios (cyclist) (born 1962), Ecuadorian cyclist
- Juan José Palacios (1944–2002), Spanish musician and record producer
