= Chris Daring =

American musician

- Born: Chris Vance; Hayti, Missouri, U.S.
- Instrument: Fiddle

Chris Daring is an American musician primarily known for her work as a performer and teacher of the Texas style of fiddling, a predominant style of fiddling in the United States. In 1996, she became the first woman to win the National Adult Old-Time Fiddle Championship. Daring's students include several champion fiddlers, and she was one of the first music teachers to work with students over the Internet, through the use of webcams and iChat or AOL Instant Messenger.

Daring was born Chris Vance in Hayti, Missouri. Her parents moved the family to the Chicago suburb of Elgin, Illinois when she was six years old. Her father became a tool and die maker and her mother eventually became an executive with Knowles Electronics. Daring's grandfather, Travis Vance, was a minor country music recording artist who performed throughout the southeastern United States. She studied classical violin from grade school through high school.

After mostly leaving the violin world behind to learn fiddling, Daring recorded an album in 1988 with the Nashville Superpickers on which she was featured as the solo artist. The Superpickers were award-winning solo musicians themselves and often provided the backup on Chet Atkins’ albums. According to the project's co-producer, this was the first time in 15 years the Superpickers name was authorized for use to someone other than Atkins. Notable Superpickers members appearing on this album included guitar player Jack Solomon and drummer Roy Yeager. Dale Morris, the album's co-producer and the group's second fiddler, was the impetus for Daring's desire to learn to fiddle and her first teacher. Chris was also taught by Dale's brother, Terry Morris.

In 1995, Daring was injured during a performance. She injured her neck and crushed the nerves in her left arm that control her left hand. As a result, she was forced to focus more on teaching than performing.

Daring has taught fiddling at the University of Colorado at Denver and the University of Southern Colorado at Pueblo (now known as Colorado State University-Pueblo). As a teacher, Daring has been designated a Master Artist in fiddling by the National Endowment for the Arts and the Colorado Council on the Arts. Many of her students have become state, regional, and national fiddling champions in their respective age groups.

Daring's second album, released in 1997, included her husband and teenage children as accompanying musicians under the name Chris Daring and the Whole Nine Yards. The group provided music during the private dinner of eight world leaders and their wives at the conclusion of the 23rd G8 summit held in Denver, Colorado in 1997.
