= SS Wallsend (1943) =

History
- Name: Empire Buttress (1943–1946); Wallsend (1946–1959); Bordagain (1959–1967); Daring (1967–1976)
- Owner: Ministry of War Transport (1943–1946); Burnett Steamship Co Ltd (1946–1959); Bordagain Shipping Co Ltd (1959–1967); Compagnia de Navigazione Pinares SA (1967–1976)
- Operator: Martyn, Martyn & Co Ltd (1943–1946); Burnett Steamship Co Ltd (1946–1959); Ramon de la Sota Jr (1959–1967); Compagnia de Navigazione Pinares SA (1967–1976)
- Port of registry: (United Kingdom) West Hartlepool (1943–1946); (United Kingdom) Newcastle upon Tyne (1946–1959); (Liberia) Monrovia (1959–1976)
- Builder: William Gray & Co Ltd, West Hartlepool
- Yard number: 1150
- Launched: 6 May 1943
- Completed: July 1943
- Out of service: May 1976
- Identification: UK Official Number 168959 (1943–1959); Liberian Official Number 1475 (1959–1976); Code Letters BFKP (1943–1959)
- Fate: Scrapped

General characteristics
- Tonnage: 2,905 GRT; 1,641 NRT
- Length: 315 ft 4 in (96.11 m)
- Beam: 46 ft 5 in (14.15 m)
- Depth: 23 ft (7.01 m)
- Propulsion: 1 x triple expansion steam engine

Wallsend was a 2,905 GRT cargo ship which was built in 1943 as Empire Buttress for the Ministry of War Transport (MoWT). Completed in July 1943, she was sold postwar and renamed Wallsend. In 1959 she was sold to Liberia and renamed Bordagain, a further change of ownership in 1967 saw her renamed Daring. She served until 1976, when she was scrapped.

== Description ==
Empire Buttress was built by William Gray & Co Ltd, West Hartlepool for the MoWT. She was yard number 1150. Empire Buttress was launched on 6 May 1943 and completed in July 1943.

The ship was 315 feet 4 inches (96.11 m) long, with a beam of 46 feet 5 inches (14.15 m) and a depth of 23 feet (7.01 m). She was propelled by a triple expansion steam engine which had cylinders of 20 inches (51 cm), 31 inches (79 cm), and 55 inches (140 cm) bore by 39 inches (99 cm) stroke. The engine was built by North East Marine Engine Co (1938) Ltd, Newcastle upon Tyne.

== Career ==
Empire Buttress was operated under the management of Martyn, Martyn & Co Ltd of Newport, Wales. Her port of registry was West Hartlepool. She was a member of a number of convoys during the Second World War.

JW 59

Convoy JW 59 departed Loch Ewe on 15 August 1944 and arrived at the Kola Inlet on 24 August. Empire Buttress had orders to sail to Arkhangelsk and Molotovsk, where she was not expected. Her eventual destination was Murmansk.

SC 141

Convoy SC 141 departed Halifax, Nova Scotia on 3 September 1943 and arrived at Liverpool on 17 September. Empire Buttress was to have sailed with this convoy, but sailed with the next convoy.

SC 142

Convoy SC 142 departed Halifax, Nova Scotia on 15 September 1943 and arrived at Liverpool on 29 September. Empire Buttress was carrying a cargo of steel and pulpwood bound for Glasgow.

In 1946, Empire Buttress was sold to the Burnett Steamship Co Ltd, Newcastle upon Tyne and was renamed Wallsend. Her port of registry was changed to Newcastle upon Tyne. On 11 October 1955, Wallsend ran aground at Hook of Holland, Netherlands. She was refloated by 13 October. In 1959, Wallsend was sold to the Bordagain Shipping Co Ltd, Liberia and was renamed Bordagain. She was operated under the management of Ramon de la Sota Jr, France. In 1967, Bordagain was sold to the Compania de Navegacion Pinares SA, Panama and was renamed Daring. She served until 1976, when she was scrapped at Split, Yugoslavia, in May of that year.

== Official Numbers and Code Letters ==
Official Numbers were a forerunner to IMO Numbers. Empire Buttress and Wallsend had the United Kingdom Official Number 168959. Bordagain and Daring had the Liberian Official Number 1475.

Empire Buttress and Wallsend used the Code Letters BFKP.
