= 24th G8 summit =

1998 international leader meeting in England

- Official logo
- Host country: United Kingdom
- Dates: 15–17 May 1998
- Cities: Birmingham
- Venues: International Convention Centre
- Follows: 23rd G8 summit
- Precedes: 25th G8 summit

The 24th G8 Summit was held in Birmingham, England, United Kingdom on 15–17 May 1998. The venue for this summit meeting was the International Convention Centre.

The Group of Seven (G7) was an unofficial forum which brought together the heads of the richest industrialized countries: France, Germany, Italy, Japan, the United Kingdom, the United States, and Canada starting in 1976. The G8, meeting for the first time in 1997, was formed with the addition of Russia. In addition, the President of the European Commission has been formally included in summits since 1981. The summits were not meant to be linked formally with wider international institutions; and in fact, a mild rebellion against the stiff formality of other international meetings was a part of the genesis of cooperation between France's president Valéry Giscard d'Estaing and Germany's chancellor Helmut Schmidt as they conceived the initial summit of the Group of Six (G6) in 1975.

== Leaders at the summit ==
Leaders of the G8 meeting at Birmingham Museum and Art Gallery, 15 May 1998

The G8 is an unofficial annual forum for the leaders of Canada, the European Commission, France, Germany, Italy, Japan, Russia, the United Kingdom, and the United States.

The 24th G8 summit was the last summit for German Chancellor Helmut Kohl and Japanese Prime Minister Ryutaro Hashimoto.

=== Participants ===
These summit participants are the current "core members" of the international forum:

**Core G8 members** Host state and leader are shown in bold text.
Member		Represented by	Title
(Canada)	Canada	Jean Chrétien	Prime Minister
(France)	France	Jacques Chirac	President
(Germany)	Germany	Helmut Kohl	Chancellor
(Italy)	Italy	Romano Prodi	Prime Minister
(Japan)	Japan	Ryutaro Hashimoto	Prime Minister
(Russia)	Russia	Boris Yeltsin	President
(United Kingdom)	**United Kingdom**	**Tony Blair**	**Prime Minister**
(United States)	United States	Bill Clinton	President
(European Union)	European Union	Jacques Santer	Commission President
(European Union)	European Union	**Tony Blair**	Council President

== Deliberations ==
The summit was intended as a venue for resolving differences among its members. As a practical matter, the summit was also conceived as an opportunity for its members to give each other mutual encouragement in the face of difficult economic decisions. Traditionally, the host country of a G8 summit sets the agenda for negotiations, which take place primarily amongst multi-national civil servants in the weeks before the summit itself, leading to a joint declaration which all countries can agree to sign.

The summit issued an "Action Program on Forests", which focused on five themes:

1. monitoring and assessment
2. national forest programmes
3. protected areas
4. private sector
5. illegal logging

and made a pledge to report back on progress in 2000. One view published in 2000 found little evidence of follow-up action or programme, but a formal report on implementation was drawn together for the Kyushu Okinawa Summit in July 2000, which included country-by-country reports on implementation.

Outside the summit, a reported assembly of around 70,000 people formed a human chain around the city, demonstrating concern regarding the indebted poverty of many poor countries and the need for international leaders to take action to remit that debt.

== Criticisms ==
For some, the G8 summit became a profit-generating event; as for example, the official G8 Summit magazines which have been published under the auspices of the host nations for distribution to all attendees since 1998.

== Gallery of participating leaders ==
=== Core G8 participants ===
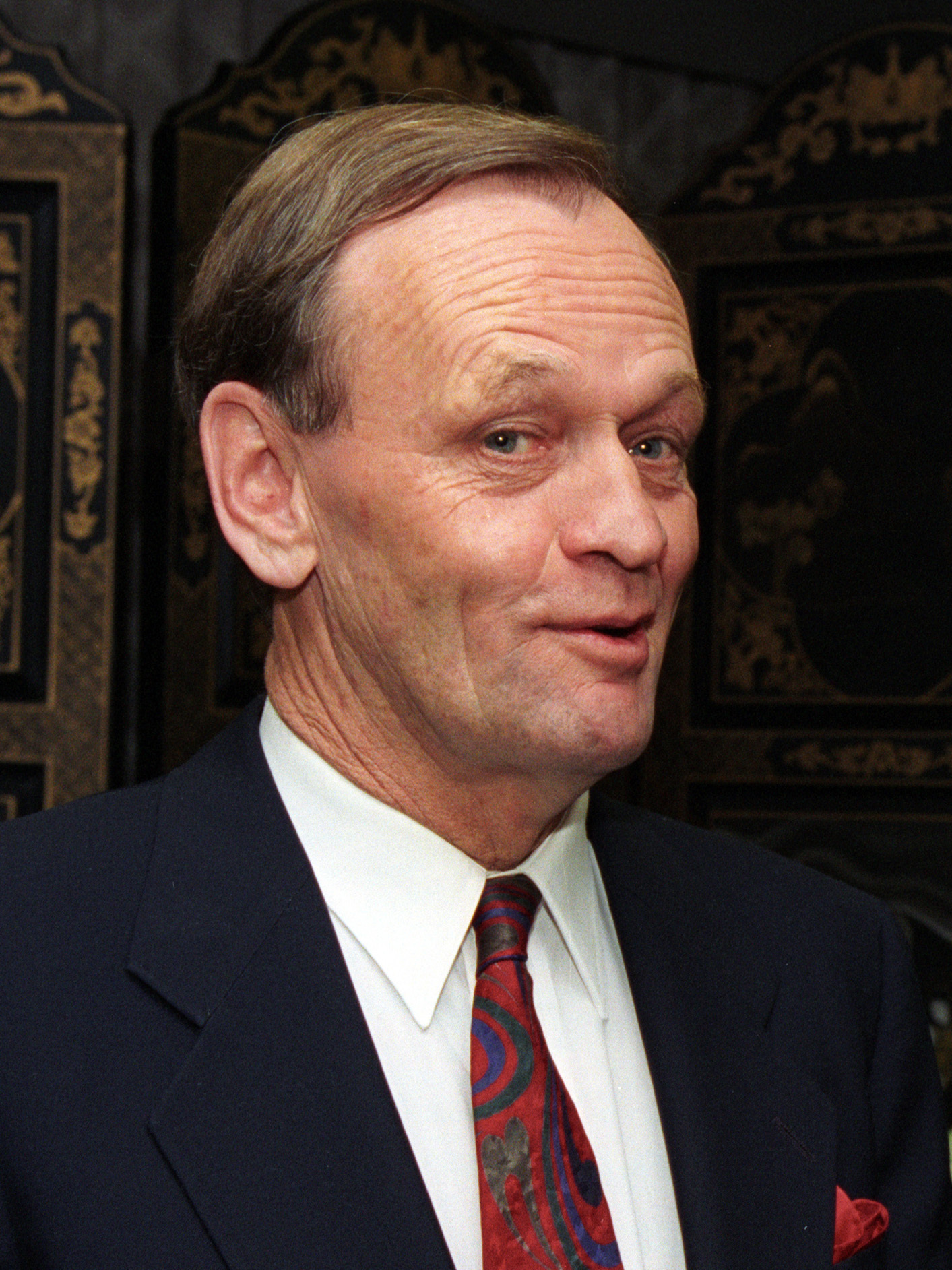
(Canada) Canada
Jean Chrétien,
Prime Minister

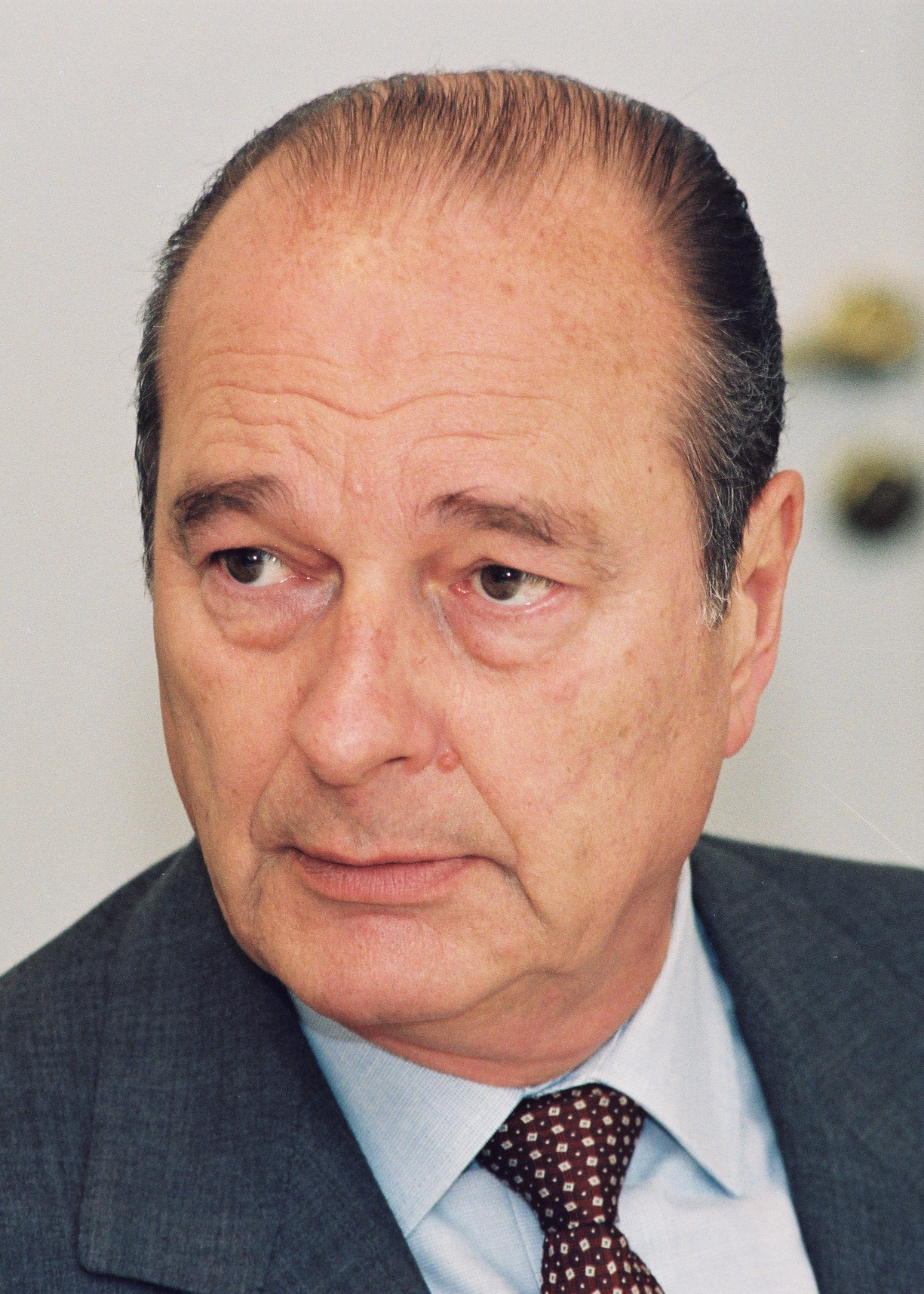
(France) France
Jacques Chirac,
President

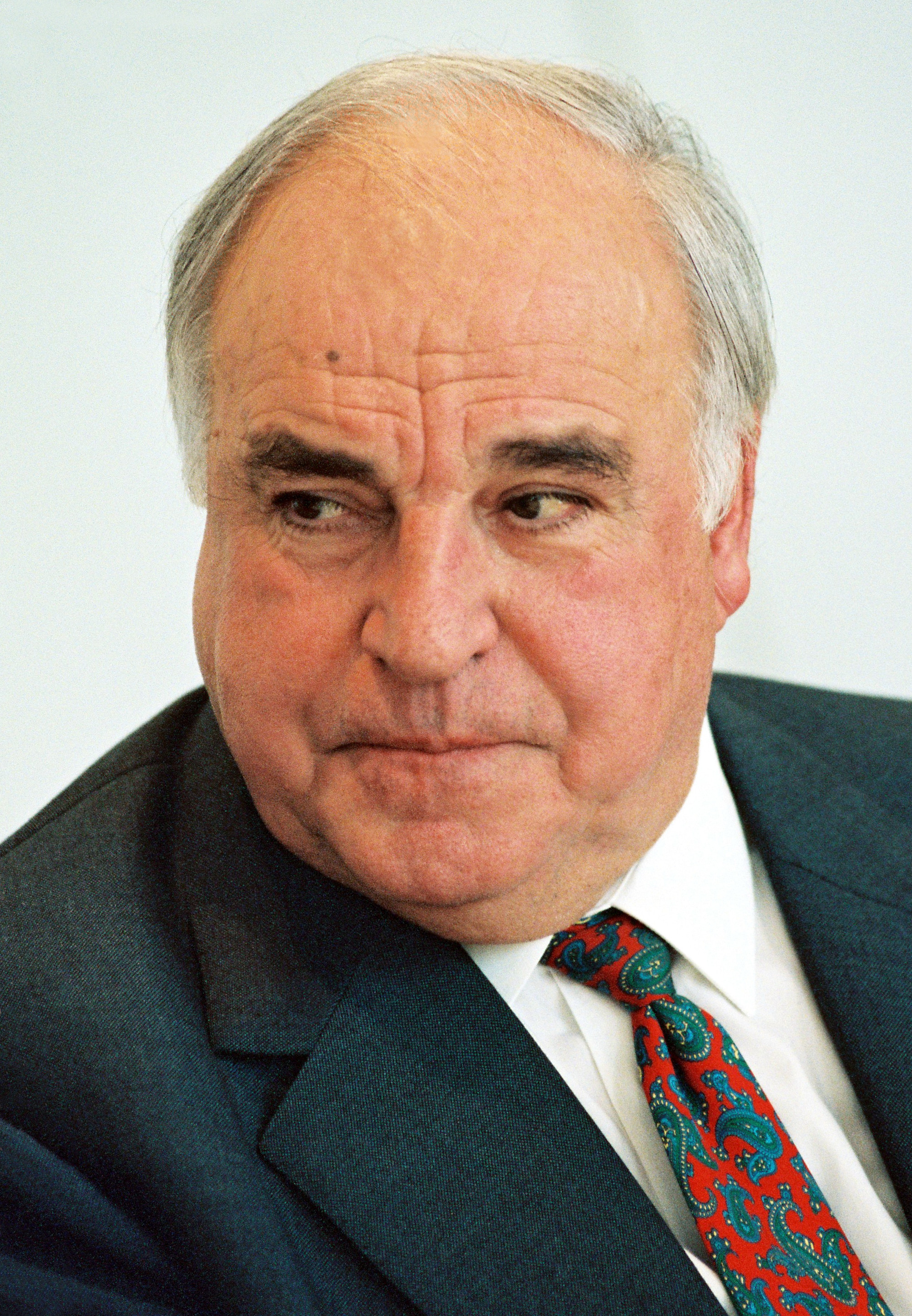
(Germany) Germany
Helmut Kohl,
Chancellor

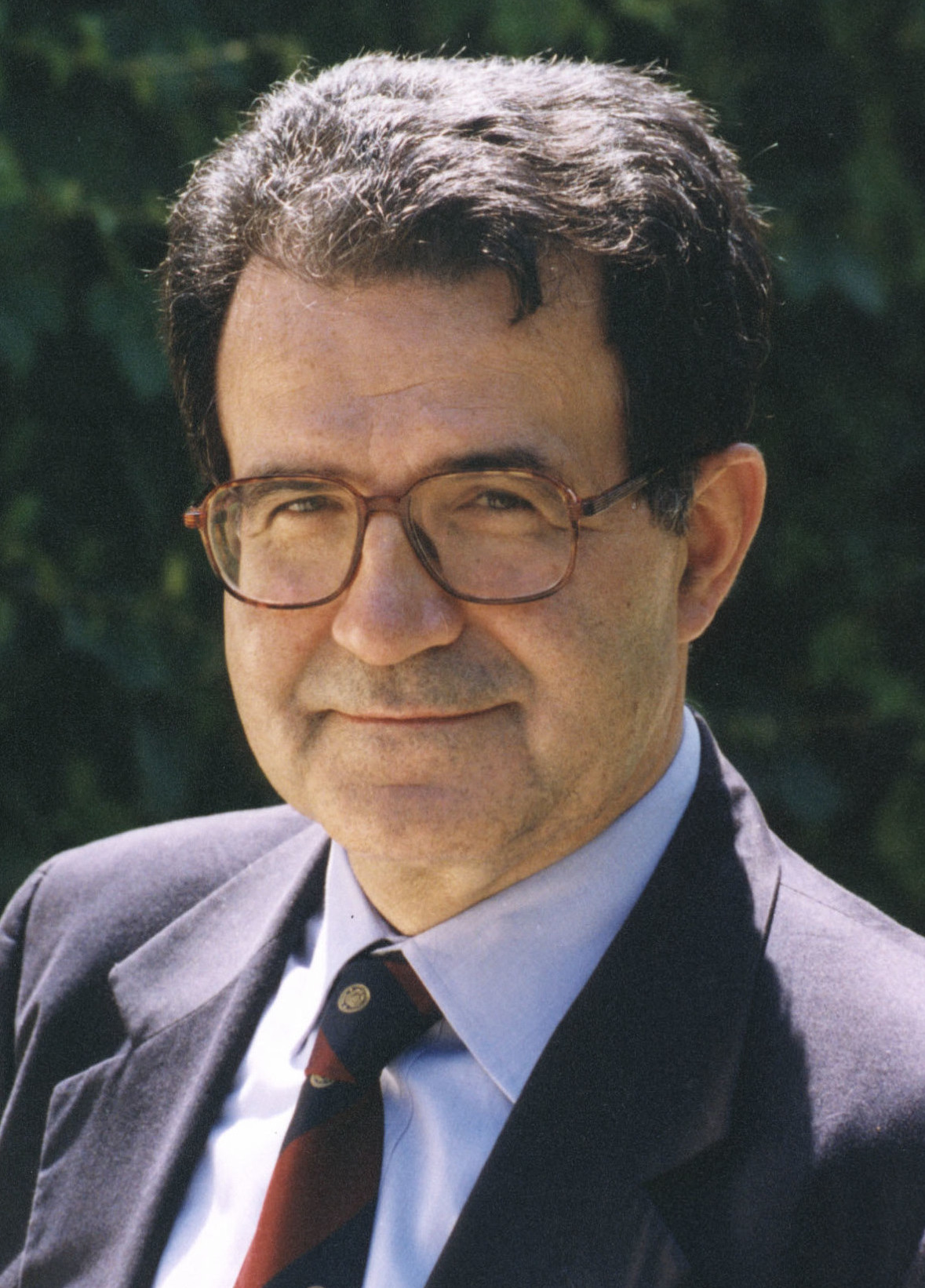
(Italy) Italy
Romano Prodi,
Prime Minister

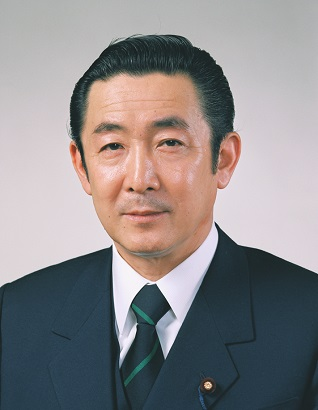
(Japan) Japan
Ryutaro Hashimoto,
Prime Minister

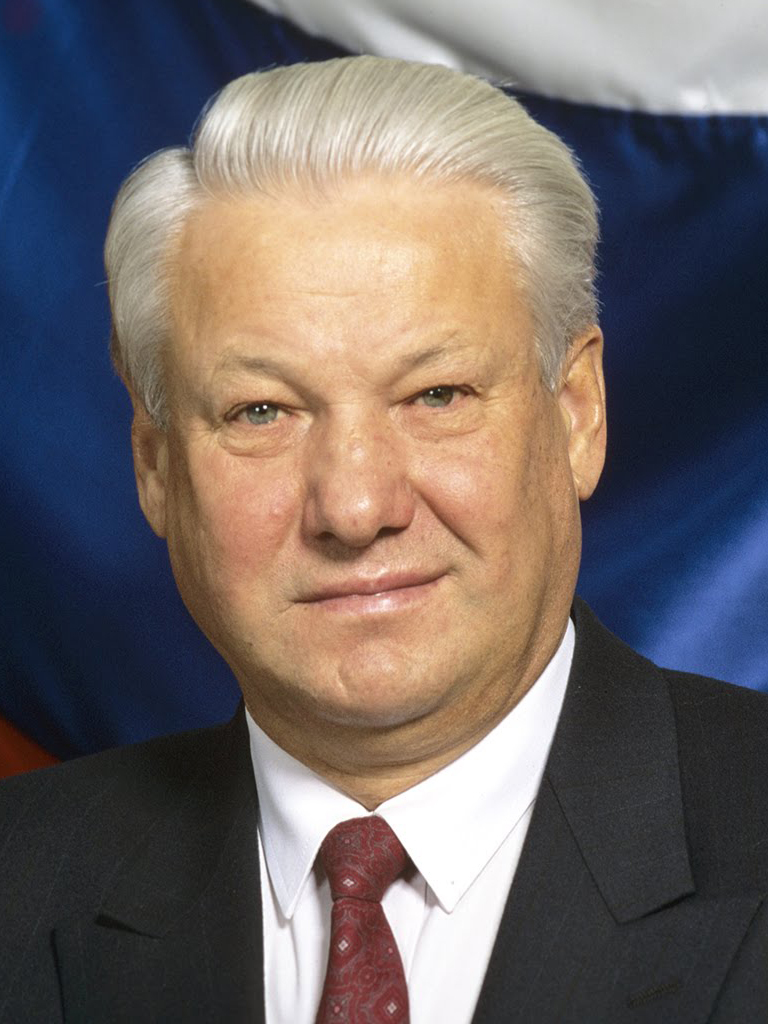
(Russia) Russia
Boris Yeltsin,
President

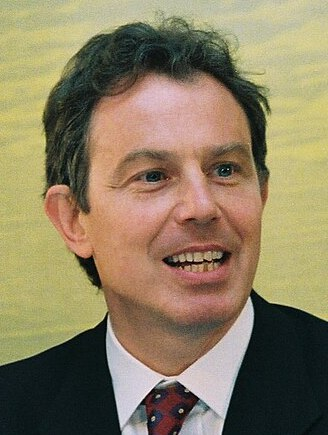
(United Kingdom) United Kingdom
Tony Blair,
Prime Minister (Host)

(United States) United States
Bill Clinton,
President

== Sources ==
- Bayne, Nicholas and Robert D. Putnam. (2000). Hanging in There: The G7 and G8 Summit in Maturity and Renewal. Aldershot, Hampshire, England: Ashgate Publishing. ISBN 0-7546-1185-X; ISBN 978-0-7546-1185-1; OCLC 43186692
- Reinalda, Bob and Bertjan Verbeek. (1998). Autonomous Policy Making by International Organizations. London: Routledge. ISBN 0-415-16486-9; ISBN 978-0-415-16486-3; ISBN 978-0-203-45085-7; ISBN 0-203-45085-X; OCLC 39013643
