= Daring-class destroyer =

Daring-class destroyer may refer to:

- Daring-class destroyer (1893), Royal Navy ships launched in 1893 and 1894
- Daring-class destroyer (1949), Royal Navy ships launched during the late 1940s and through the 1950s
- Type 45 destroyer, also known as Daring class, Royal Navy ships launched from 2006 onwards

== See also ==
- Daring (keelboat), a class of keelboat raced in Cowes
