= Daring (schooner) =

19th c. New Zealand schooner

Daring was a 17-metre (55'8") schooner, launched on 1 September 1863 in Mangawhai, New Zealand. It was wrecked twice, once in 1864, and again in 1865. Daring's wreck was excavated in December 2018 after being exposed by shifting sands.

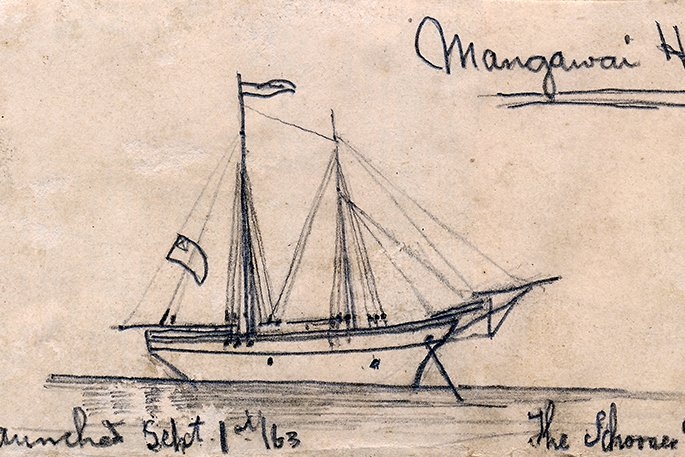
Sketch of Daring Schooner, NZ

== Construction ==
Daring was a two-masted schooner, built as a cargo vessel in Mangawhai ship yard, New Zealand. Its construction was kauri carvel plank, with Muntz metal (60% Copper, 40% Zinc) on the hull. The ship was built by a Scottish boat builder, Donald McInnes. Daring was built for John Matheson and John Rattray, of Onehunga.

== First wreck and repairs ==
On 1 June 1864, little over a year after launching, Daring stranded on the South side of the bar at the mouth of the Waikato River. The vessel was originally reported to be a total wreck, but was subsequently repaired and re-floated.

== Second wreck and total loss ==
On 22 February 1865, Daring was sailing from Taranaki to the Manukau with a cargo of grass seed. A severe gale arose when the vessel was offshore of the Kaipara Heads. It was blown on to the Rangahia Beach, near the South Head of Kaipara Harbour. The crew's attempts to keep the schooner off the beach were unsuccessful. She was left on the beach above the tide line. The crew rolled and jacked the vessel to the half tide mark, hoping to re-float her with the next full tide. A heavy gale began blowing on the morning of 23 February 1865, just before the full tide, and a heavy swell set in from the West. Daring was eventually driven back to her original position lower down the beach, and became a total loss. The ship and cargo of grass seed were uninsured.

== Re-discovery and recovery ==
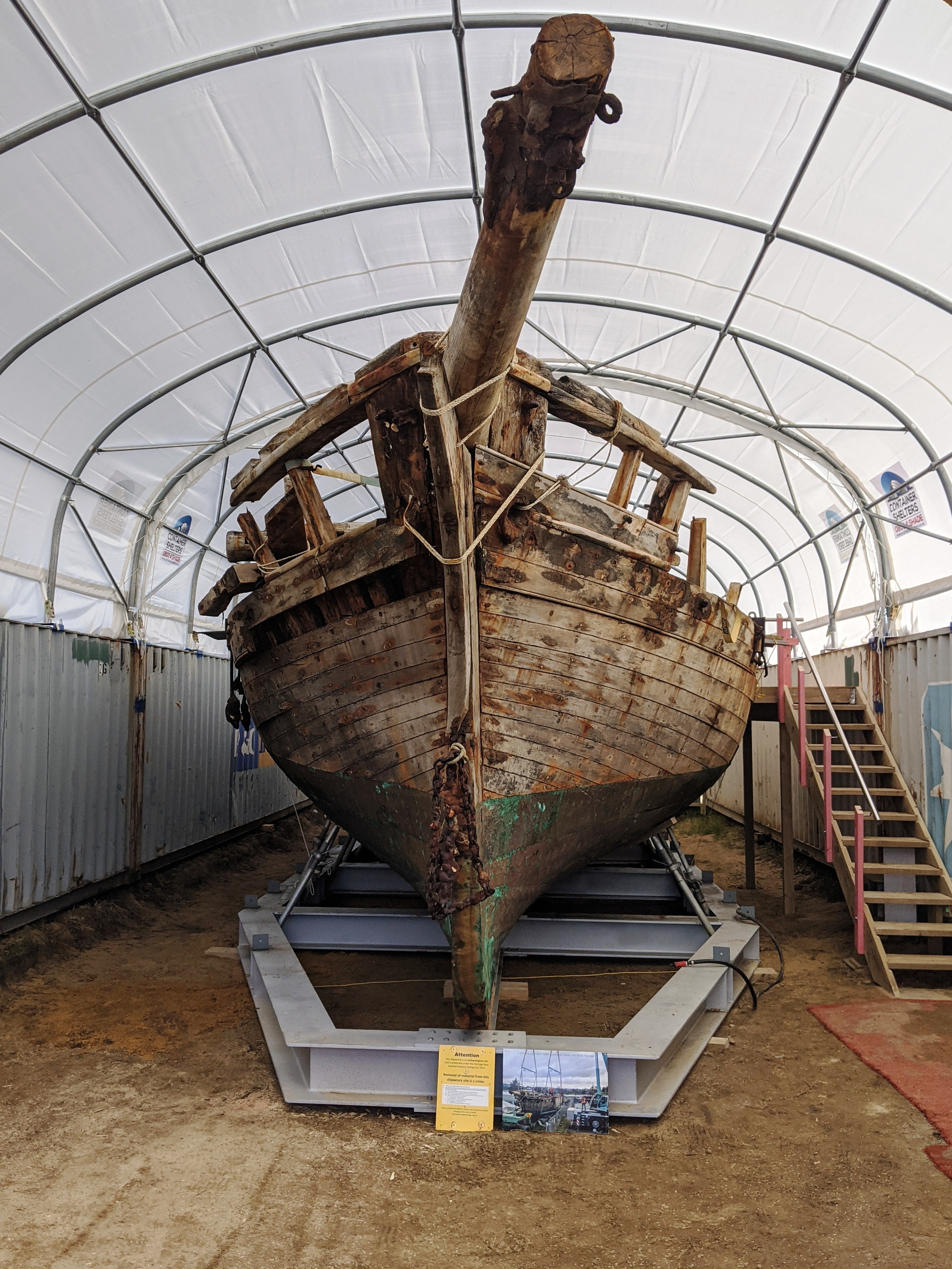
The Daring shipwreck at Mangawhai Museum

On 27 May 2017, the remains of the wreck were spotted by a local resident. The wreck had been uncovered by shifting sands having been abandoned and buried after wrecking on the beach.

After obtaining council permission, Daring was recovered on 12 December 2018 by the Daring Rescue Team, with assistance from the Classic Yacht Charitable Trust. Items abandoned with the wreck were also uncovered, including coins and a boot.

Daring was relocated to Hobsonville, pending plans for its preservation and display. As of January 2019, Daring is supported by a scaffolding frame and covered with shrink wrap while stabilisation work is undertaken. Volunteers wet the timbers daily to ensure the wood does not split.
