= Palacio =

Palacio (palace) is a Spanish habitational name. It may have originated from many places in Spain, especially in Galicia and Asturias. Notable people with the surname include:

- Agustina Palacio de Libarona (1825–1880), Argentine writer, storyteller, heroine
- Alberto Palacio, Spanish engineer
- Alfredo Palacio (1939–2025), Ecuadorian cardiologist and politician, president of Ecuador (2005–2007)
- Andy Palacio, Belizean musician
- Emilio Palacio, Ecuadorian journalist
- Ernesto Palacio, Peruvian opera singer
- Héctor Palacio, Colombian road racing cyclist
- Milt Palacio, Belizean-American basketball player
- R. J. Palacio, American writer of the 2012 children's novel Wonder
- Rodrigo Palacio, Argentinian footballer
- Thomas Palacio, Belizean victim of crime

== See also ==
- Palacios (disambiguation)
