= Juan Palacios (cyclist) =

Ecuadorian cyclist

Personal information
- Born: 6 February 1962 (age 64)

Cycling career
- Sport: Cycling

Juan Palacios (born 6 February 1962) is an Ecuadorian former cyclist. He competed in the team pursuit event at the 1980 Summer Olympics.
