= Daring (keelboat) =

Daring (Keelboat)
Development
- Designer: Arthur Robb
- Location: Cowes
- Year: 1961
- Design: One-Design
- Name: Daring (Keelboat)

Boat
- Crew: 3 - 4
- Draft: 1.35 m (4 ft 5 in)

Hull
- Type: Monohull
- Construction: GRP; Cold moulded plywood decks on older boats
- Hull weight: 2,175 kg (4,795 lb)
- LOA: 9.91 m (32.5 ft)
- LWL: 7.01 m (23.0 ft)
- Beam: 1.98 m (6 ft 6 in)

Hull appendages
- Keel: Fin keel

Rig
- Rig type: Fractional sloop

Sails
- Upwind sail area: 34.0 m^{2} (366 sq ft) plus spinnaker

The Daring is a One-Design keelboat which is based in Cowes on the Isle of Wight and races throughout the season around the Solent. Its construction is GRP, with some older yachts possessing original wooden decks.

The first Darings were designed by Arthur Robb, based on his 5.5 Metre yacht Vision which was built for and won silver in the 1956 Olympics. 35 yachts of the class were built in the years up to 1992. In 2008 a new hull mould was commissioned to match the original lines but with a redesigned ergonomic deck and cockpit. One new yacht was built and several more obtained new hulls while keeping the original name, number, rigging and keel.

To date all Darings are based in Cowes apart from three (8, Day Dreamer; 18, Deva; 20, Afroessa) sold to owners in Beirut, Cumbria and Majorca respectively. Most Darings' names begin with "D".

The season runs for approximately 80 races from April through to October, with highlights including Cowes Classics Week and Cowes Week in June and August. The Daring Class Association manages the class rules carefully to ensure affordability, uniformity and close racing. The class is not often raced against other designs of yachts, as the class racing is usually competitive and well attended, however occasionally pursuit races are competed with other classes of yacht in the Solent.

The Class Association has a number of strong affiliations, including with the International One Design fleet. This provides for the winner of Cowes Week each year to compete at Bermuda International Invitational Race Week in IODs. Further the class has links with foreign yacht clubs which will annually compete a team racing challenge in home or foreign waters. Competitors in the past have included the Royal Bermuda Yacht Club, the Royal Freshwater Bay Yacht Club in Perth, Western Australia and the Seawanhaka Corinthian Yacht Club on Long Island, USA.
