= 23rd G8 summit =

1997 international leader meeting in the US

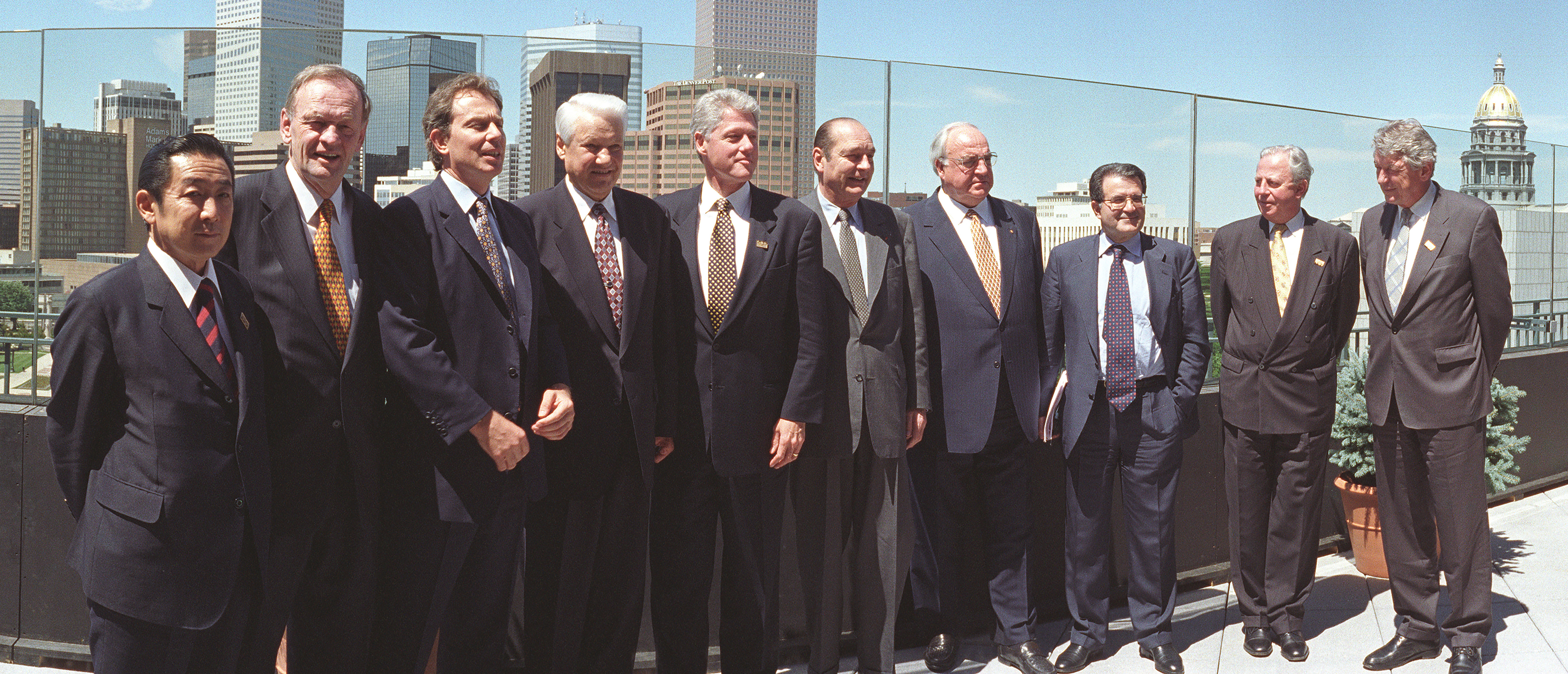
- Family photo of the G8 leaders
- Host country: United States
- Dates: June 20–22, 1997
- Cities: Denver
- Venues: Denver Public Library
- Follows: 22nd G7 summit
- Precedes: 24th G8 summit

The 23rd G8 summit was held on June 20–22, 1997 in Denver, Colorado, United States. The venue was the newly constructed Denver Public Library in downtown Denver. The locations of previous G8 summits to have been hosted by the United States include: Dorado, Puerto Rico (1976), Williamsburg, Virginia (1983), and Houston, Texas (1990).

The Group of Seven (G7) was an unofficial forum which brought together the heads of the richest industrialized countries: France, Germany, Italy, Japan, the United Kingdom, the United States, and Canada starting in 1976. The G8, meeting for the first time in 1997, was formed with the addition of Russia. In addition, the president of the European Commission has been formally included in summits since 1981. The summits were not meant to be linked formally with wider international institutions; and in fact, a mild rebellion against the stiff formality of other international meetings was a part of the genesis of cooperation between France's president Valéry Giscard d'Estaing and West Germany's chancellor Helmut Schmidt as they conceived the initial summit of the Group of Six (G6) in 1975.

== Leaders at the summit ==
The G8 is an unofficial annual forum for the leaders of Canada, the European Commission, France, Germany, Italy, Japan, Russia, the United Kingdom, and the United States.

The 23rd G8 summit was the first summit for British prime minister Tony Blair and, as it was formed with the addition of Russia, Russian president Boris Yeltsin.

=== Participants ===
These participants were the "core members" of the 23rd G8 summit:

**Core G8 members** Host state and leader are shown in bold text.
Member		Represented by	Title
(Canada)	Canada	Jean Chrétien	Prime Minister
(France)	France	Jacques Chirac	President
(Germany)	Germany	Helmut Kohl	Chancellor
(Italy)	Italy	Romano Prodi	Prime Minister
(Japan)	Japan	Ryutaro Hashimoto	Prime Minister
(Russia)	Russia	Boris Yeltsin	President
(United Kingdom)	United Kingdom	Tony Blair	Prime Minister
(United States)	**United States**	**Bill Clinton**	**President**
(European Union)	European Union	Jacques Santer	Commission President
(European Union)	European Union	Wim Kok	Council President

== Priorities ==
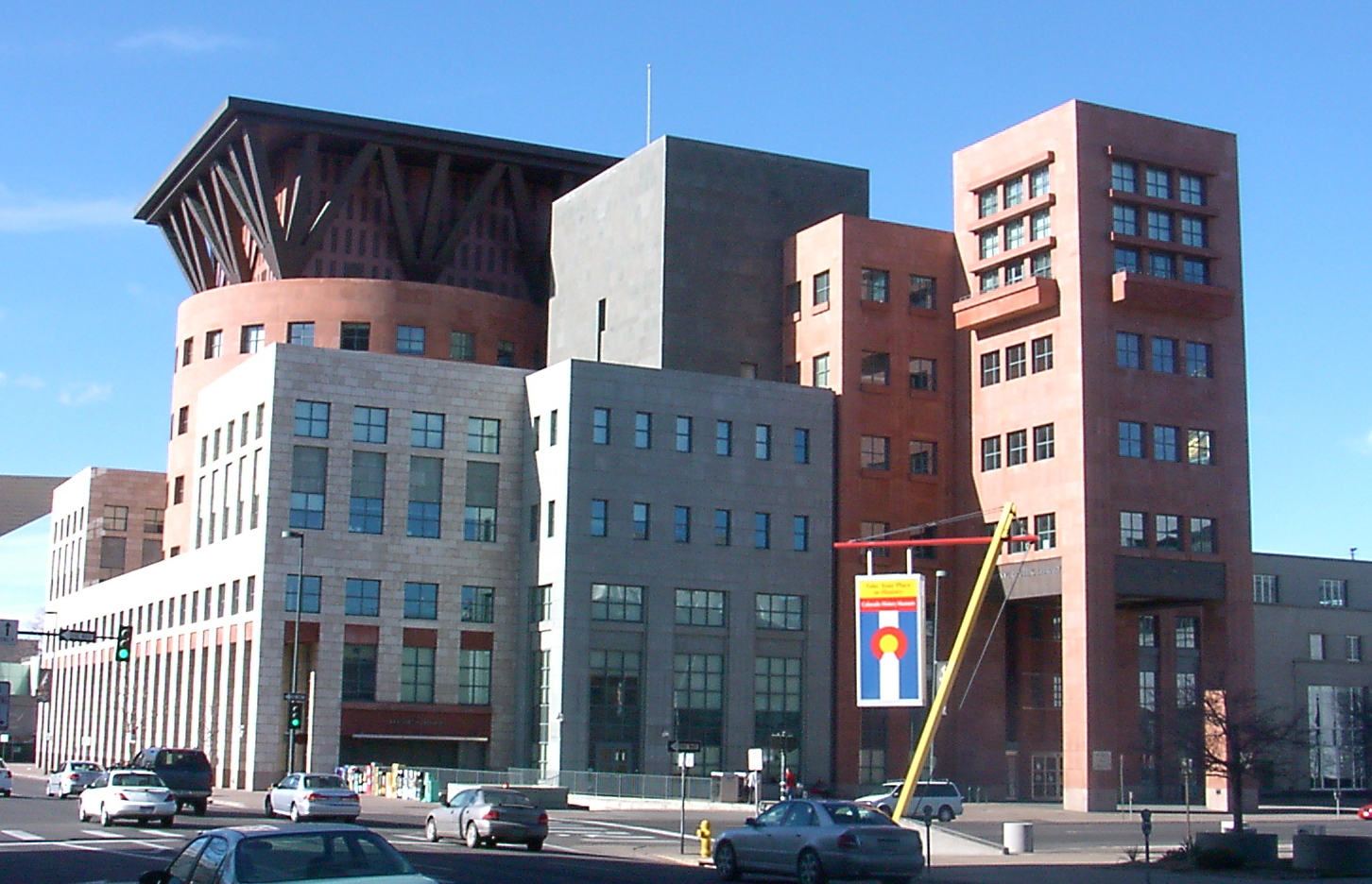
The newly built Denver Public Library

Traditionally, the host country of the G8 summit sets the agenda for negotiations, which take place primarily amongst multi-national civil servants in the weeks before the summit itself, leading to a joint declaration which all countries can agree to sign.

== Issues ==
The summit was intended as a venue for resolving differences among its members. As a practical matter, the summit was also conceived as an opportunity for its members to give each other mutual encouragement in the face of difficult economic decisions.

== Accomplishments ==
A tangible legacy of this summit is the Denver Public Library's main building, an existing library which was transformed into a "masterful composition of new forms". The library has become recognized as one of Denver's city icons. The dramatic post-modern structure was designed by architect Michael Graves. The building was initially used as the summit site; and afterward, it was opened to the public as the city's central library.

The appearance of Boris Yelsin representing Russia as part of the G8 was transformative. Yelsin himself said, "I want very much for it to be written: 'Denver conclusively agrees that the G-7 is transformed into a G-8.'"

In 1997, the summit leaders proclaimed that forests "continue to be destroyed and degraded at alarming rates;" and the G-7 called for the elimination of "illegal logging," but there is little evidence of follow-up action.

== Business opportunity ==
For some, the G8 summit became a profit-generating event; as for example, the official G8 Summit magazines which have been published under the auspices of the host nations for distribution to all attendees since 1998. The special dining opportunities for the summit attendees were created by chefs hired especially for this occasion. President Bill Clinton’s state dinner was held at The Fort Restaurant and offered buffalo, trout, and fried squash blossoms filled with wild mushrooms and rattlesnake meat.

Denver's "Summit of the Eight" planned ahead to ensure that sensitive documents wouldn't fall into the wrong hands because those attending would have the option of shredding any documents before discarding them. The summit organizers leased more than 25 new paper shredders from a Denver company that sells, services and leases the machines—and this was the largest order of its kind for the small local business.

== Gallery of participating leaders ==
=== Core G8 participants ===
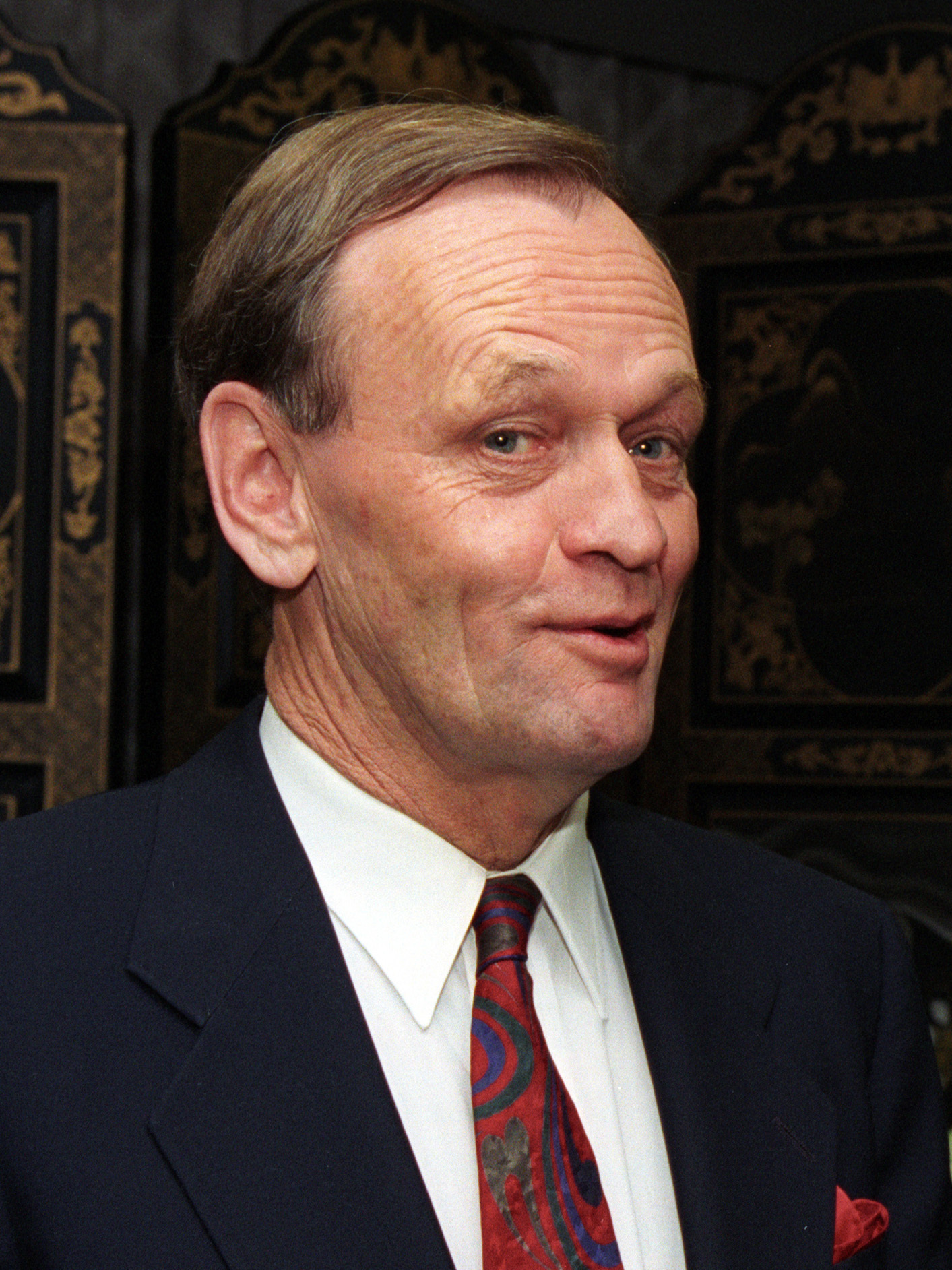
(Canada) Canada
Jean Chrétien,
Prime Minister

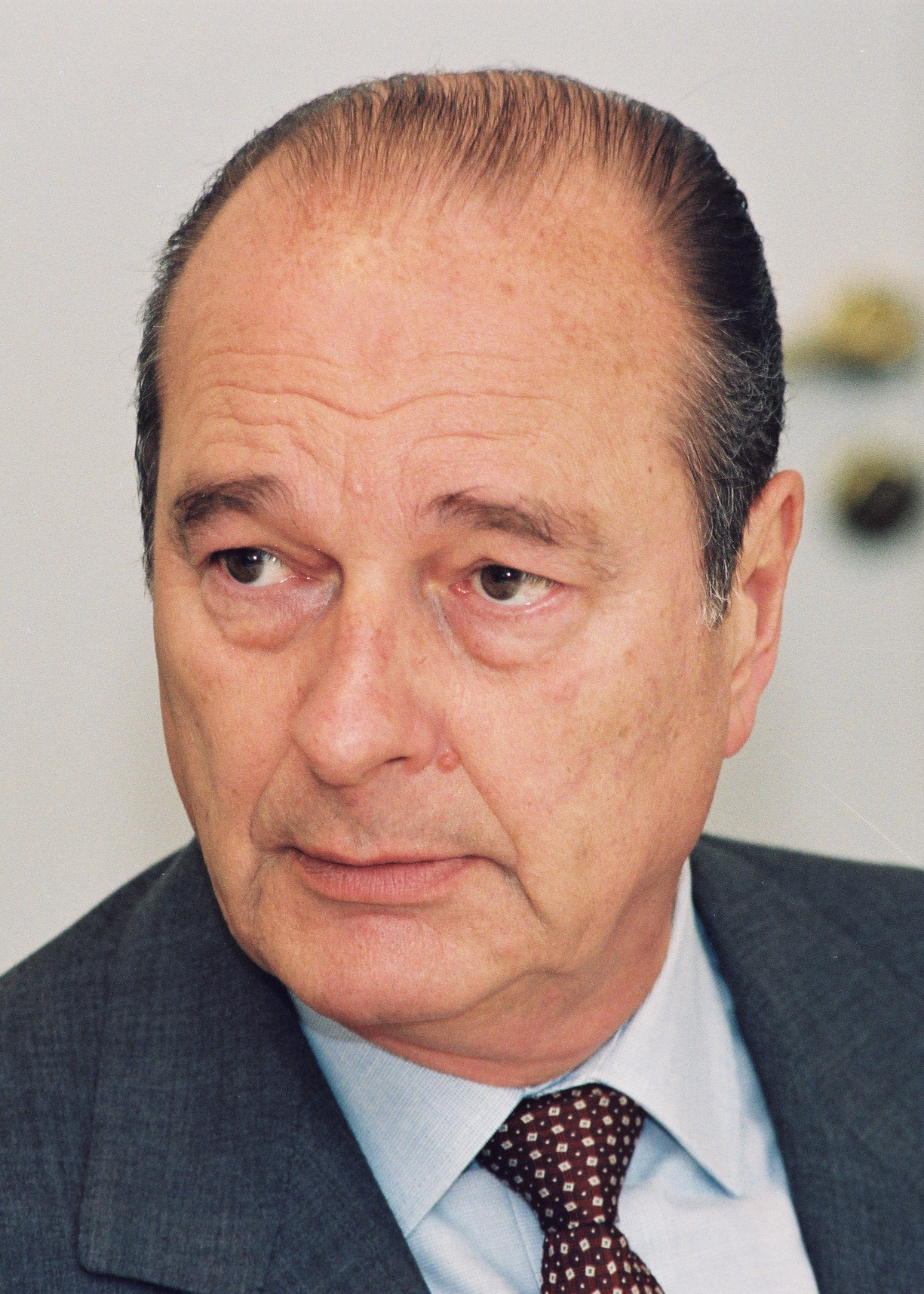
(France) France
Jacques Chirac,
President

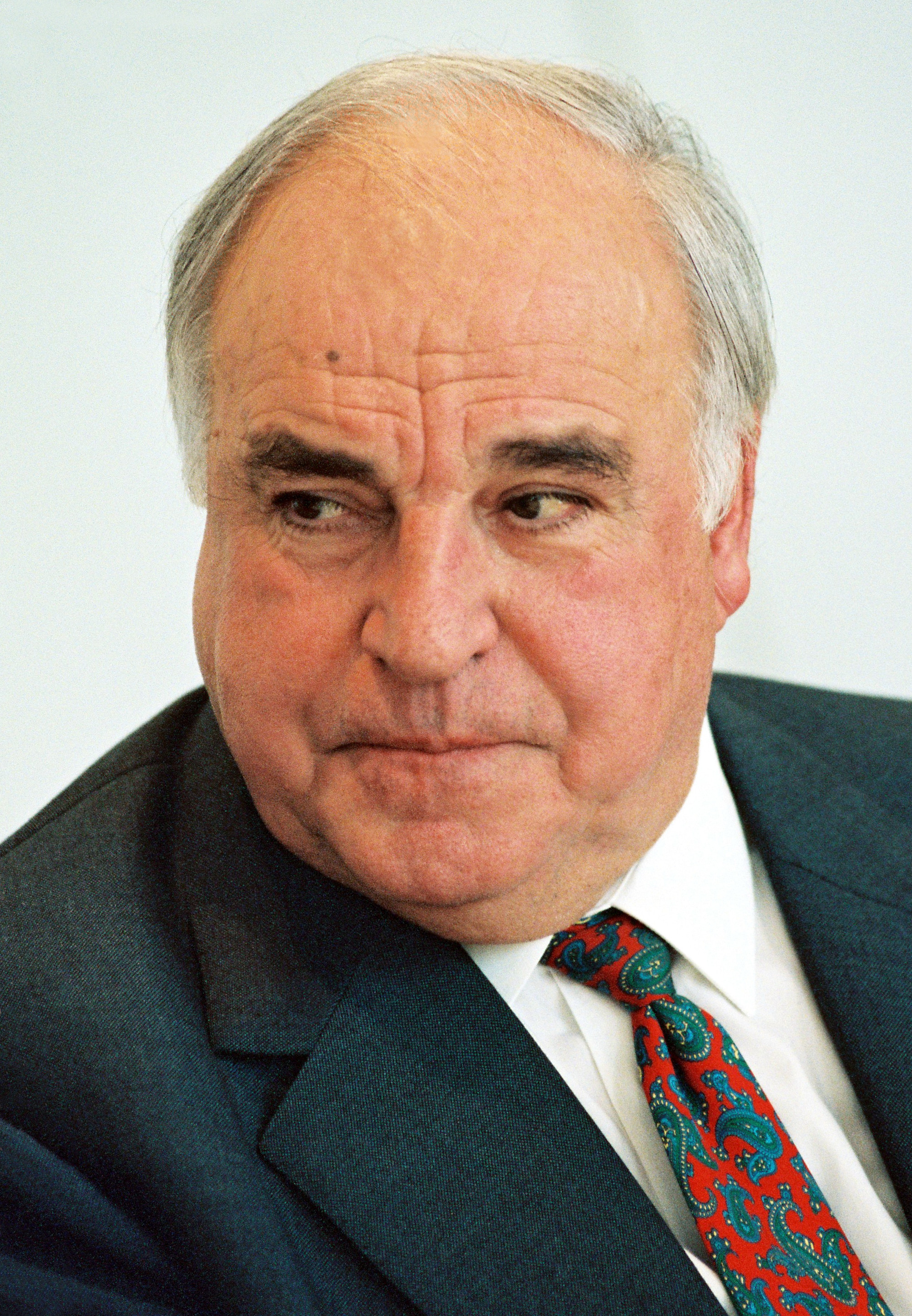
(Germany) Germany
Helmut Kohl,
Chancellor

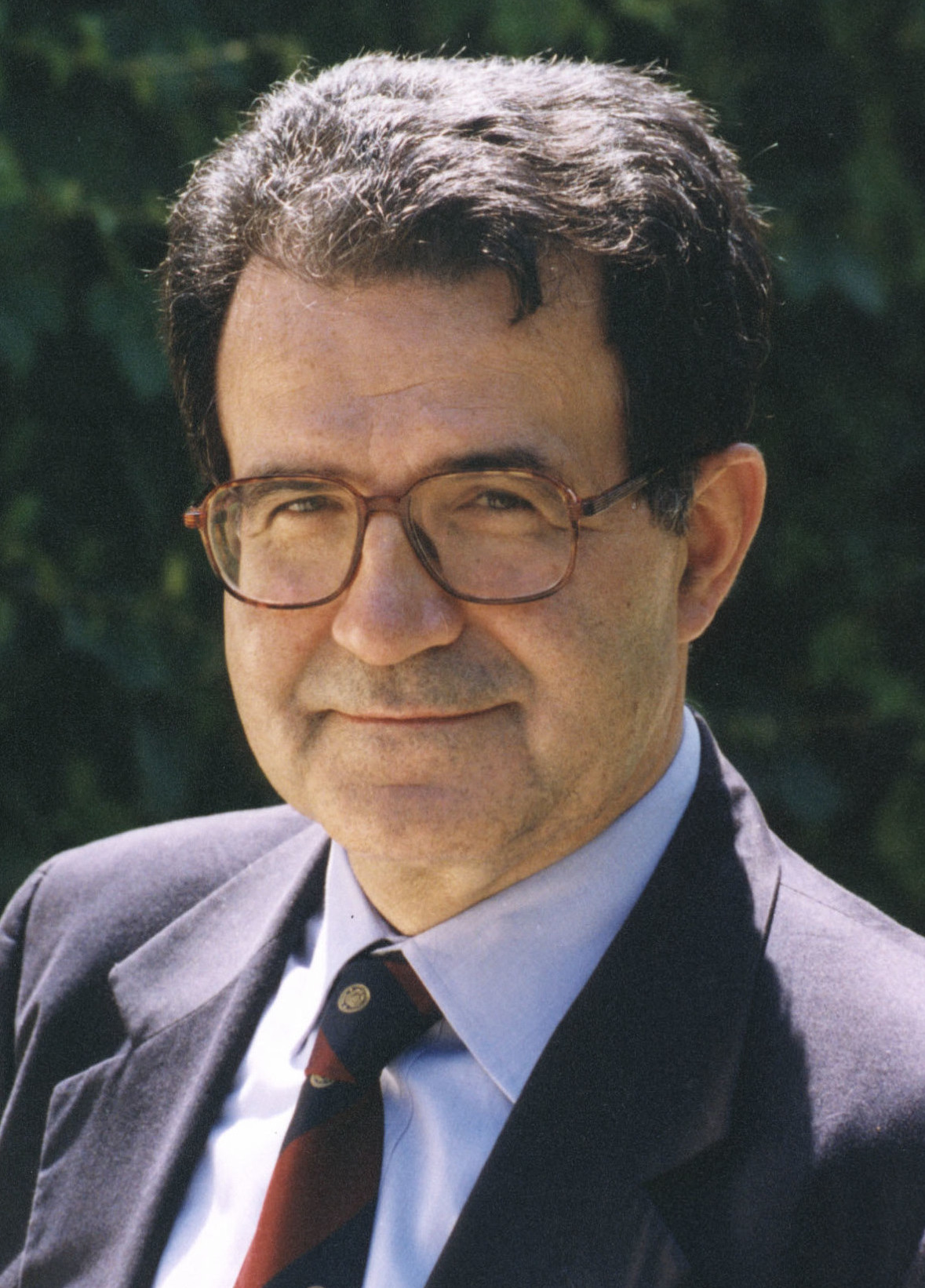
(Italy) Italy
Romano Prodi,
Prime Minister

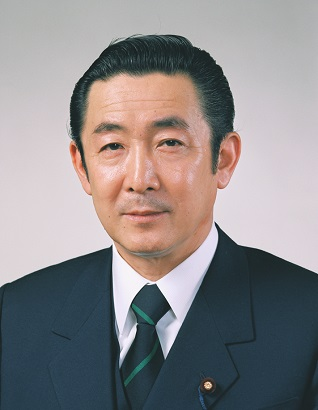
(Japan) Japan
Ryutaro Hashimoto,
Prime Minister

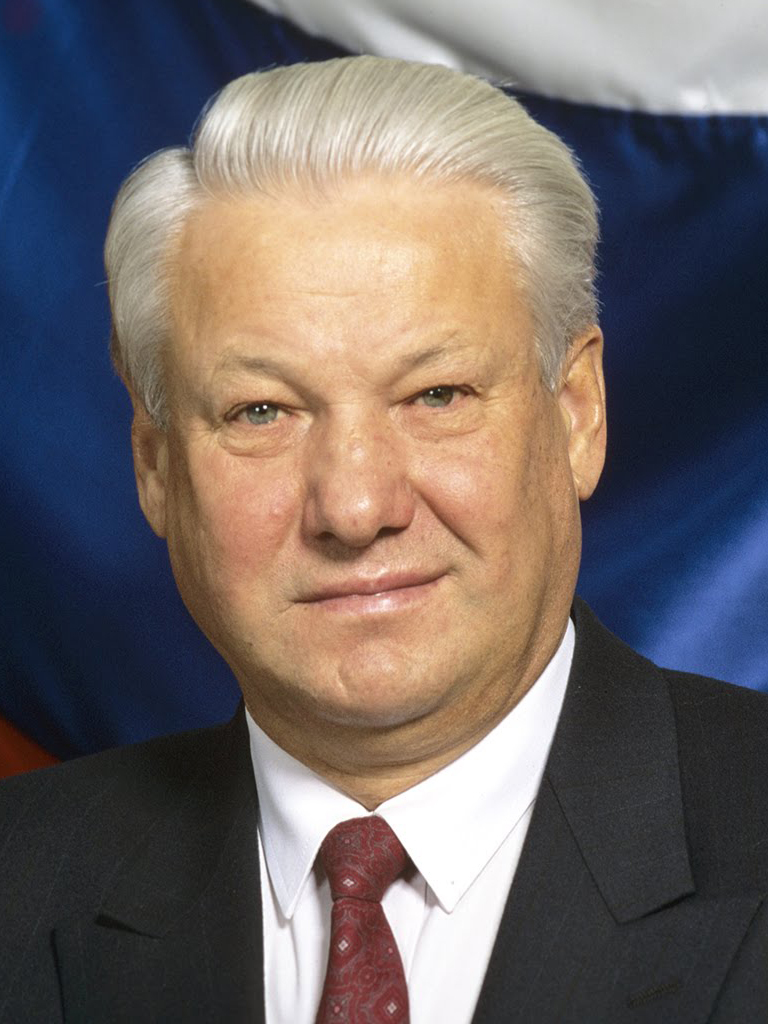
(Russia) Russia
Boris Yeltsin,
President

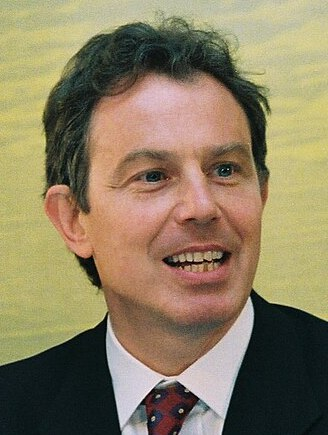
(United Kingdom) United Kingdom
Tony Blair,
Prime Minister

(United States) United States
Bill Clinton,
President (Host)
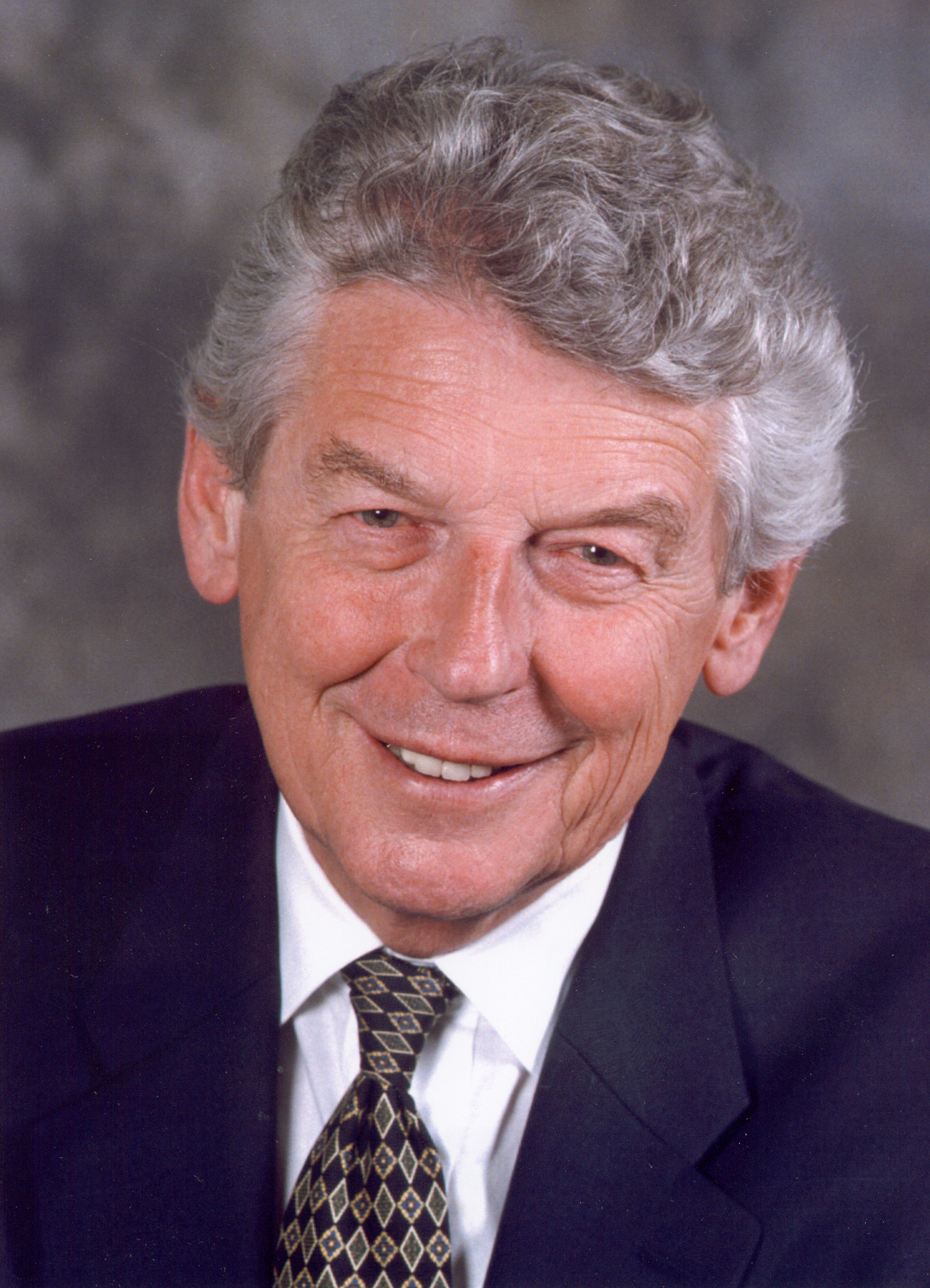
(European Union) European Union
Wim Kok,
Council President

== Sources ==
- Bayne, Nicholas and Robert D. Putnam. (2000). Hanging in There: The G7 and G8 Summit in Maturity and Renewal. Aldershot, Hampshire, England: Ashgate Publishing. ISBN 978-0-7546-1185-1; OCLC 43186692
- Reinalda, Bob and Bertjan Verbeek. (1998). Autonomous Policy Making by International Organizations. London: Routledge. ISBN 978-0-415-16486-3; ISBN 978-0-203-45085-7; OCLC 39013643
