= Foreign policy of the George W. Bush administration =

The main event by far shaping the United States foreign policy during the presidency of George W. Bush (2001–2009) was the 9/11 terrorist attacks against the United States on September 11, 2001, and the subsequent war on terror. There was massive domestic and international support for destroying the attackers. With UN approval, US and NATO forces quickly invaded the attackers' base in Afghanistan and drove them out and the Taliban government that harbored them. It was the start of a 20-year quagmire that finally ended in failure with the withdrawal of United States troops from Afghanistan.

Other interactions with foreign nations during this period included diplomatic and military initiatives in the Middle East, Africa, and elsewhere. Important economic developments that occurred during Bush's presidency include the several free-trade agreements.

The chief advisors of the president were Secretaries of State Colin Powell and Condoleezza Rice, National Security Advisor Stephen Hadley, and Vice President Dick Cheney.

== Appointments ==
Bush's 2001 foreign policy team

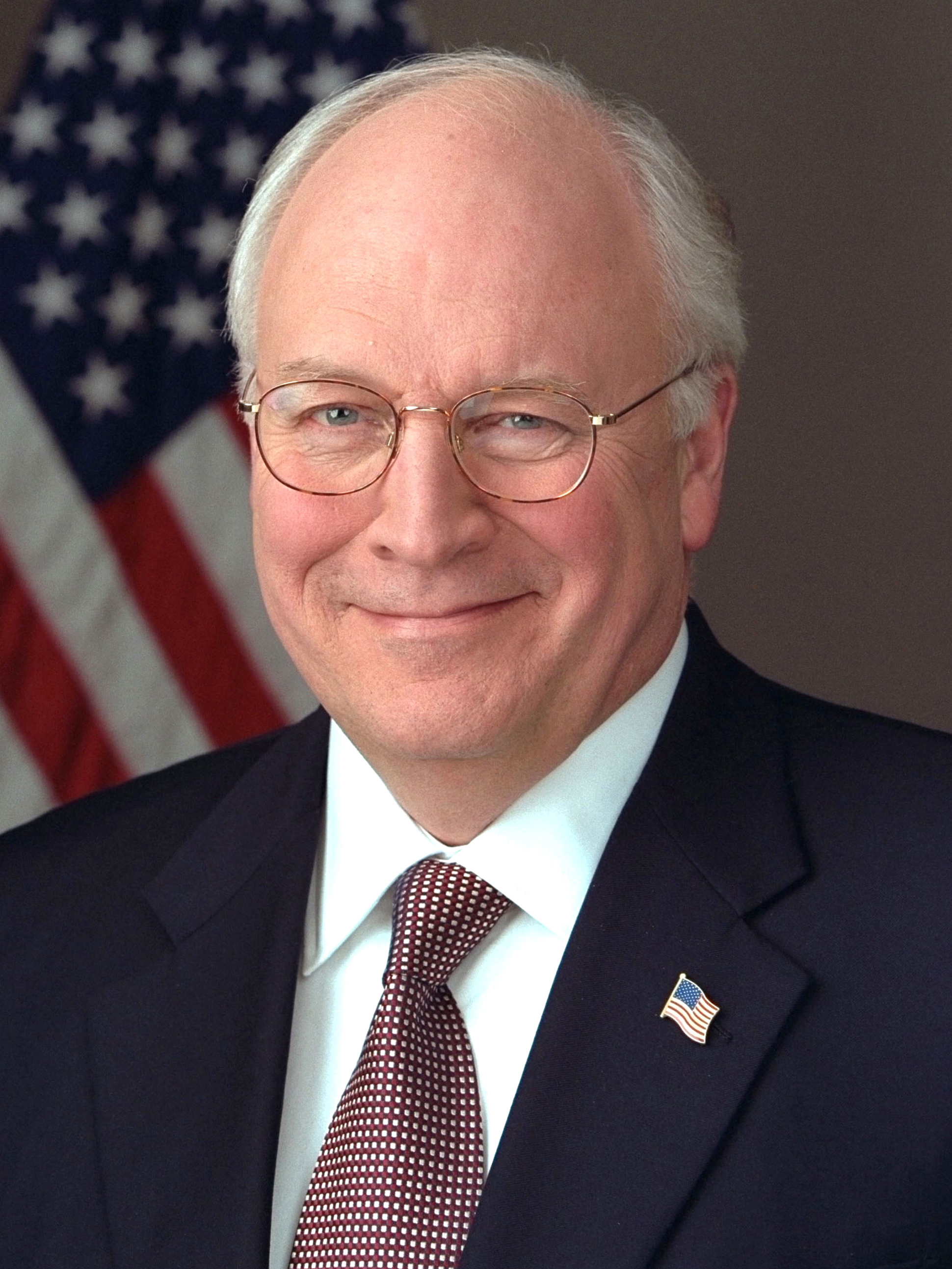
Dick Cheney

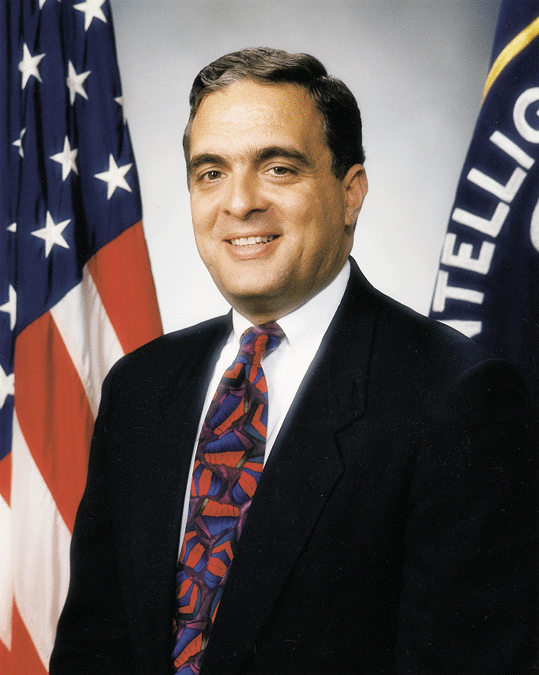
George Tenet

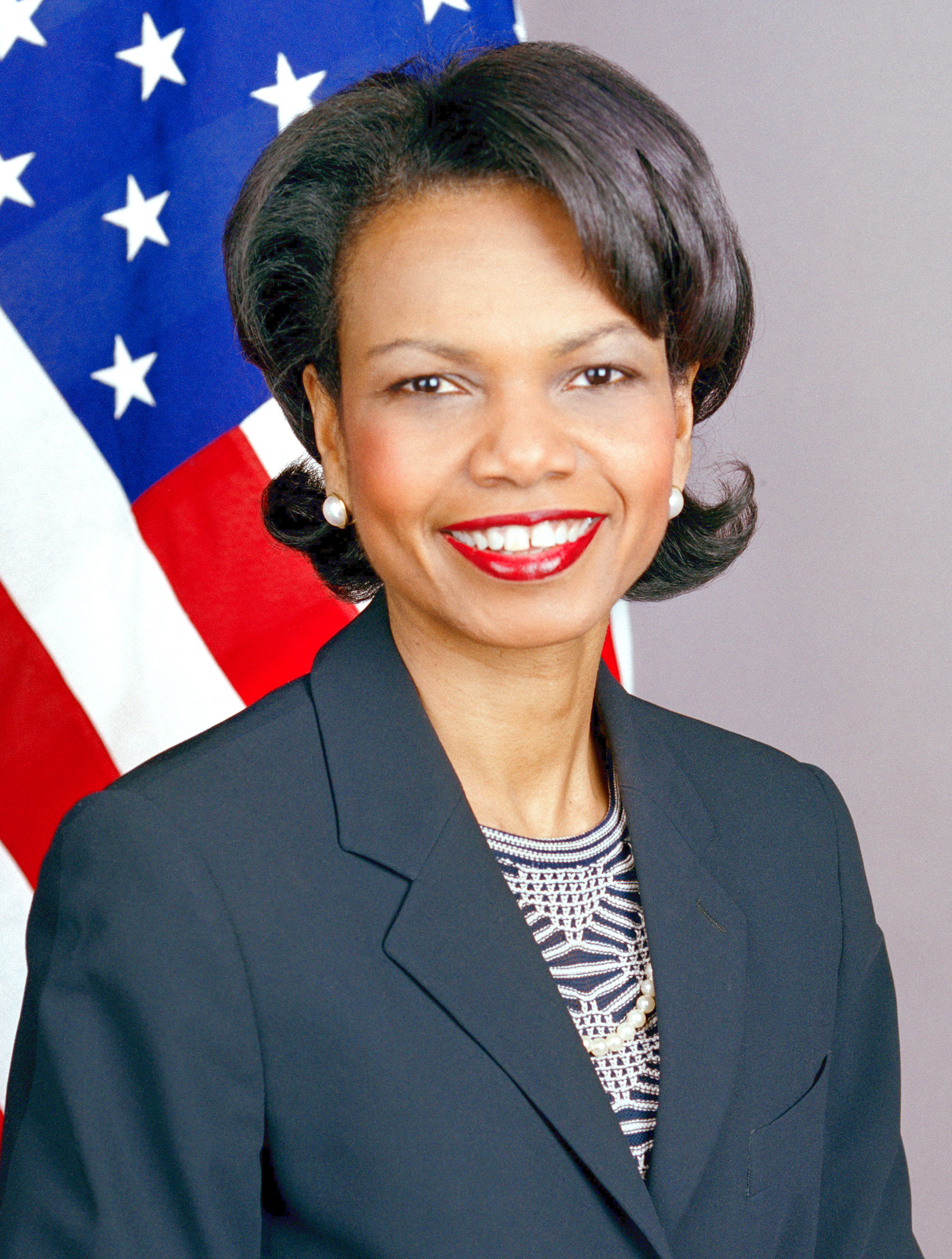
Condoleezza Rice

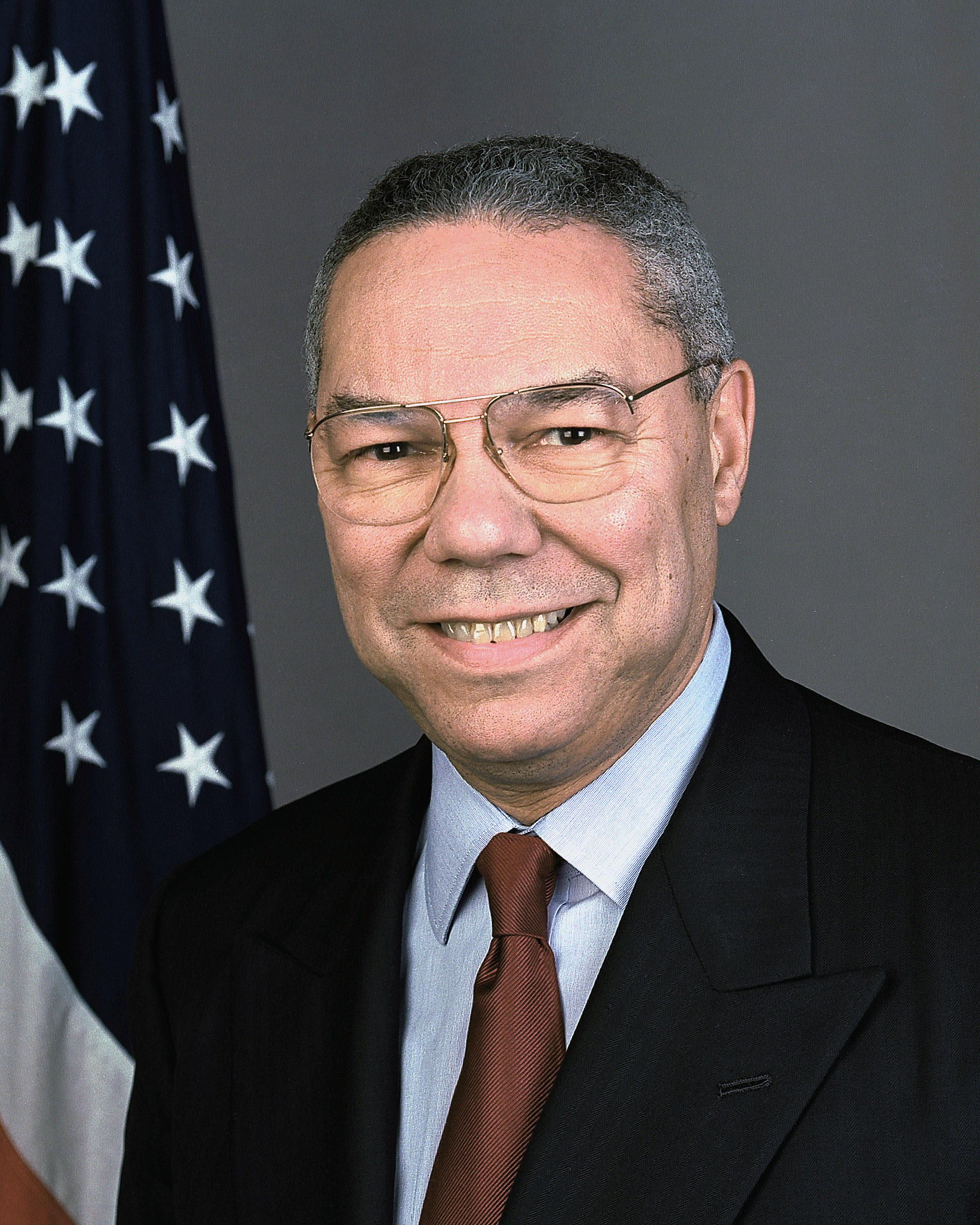
Colin Powell

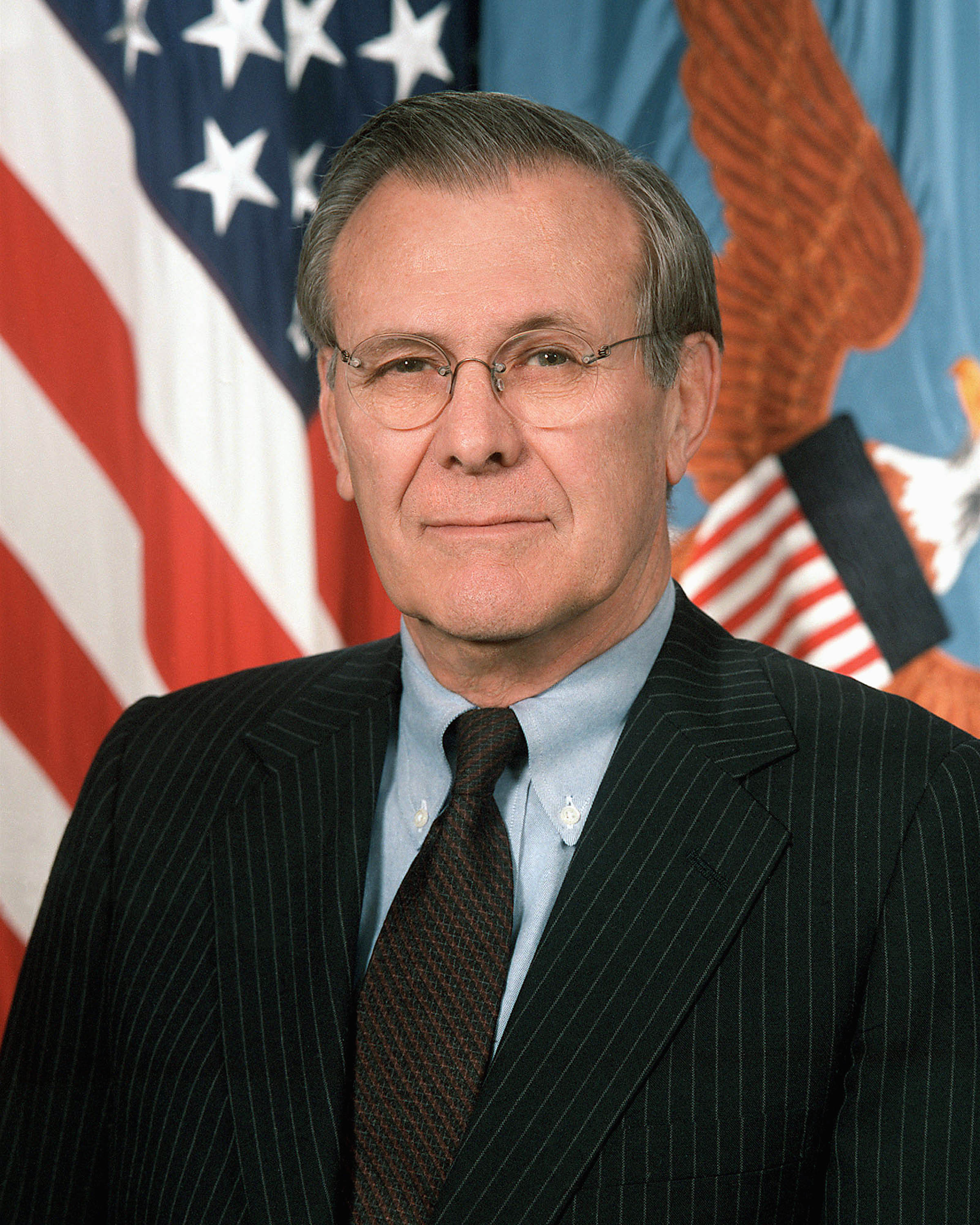
Donald Rumsfeld

George W. Bush administration foreign policy personnel
Vice President	Cheney (2001–2009)						
Secretary of State	Powell (2001–2005)			Rice (2005–2009)			
Secretary of Defense	Rumsfeld (2001–2006)					Gates (2006–2009)	
Ambassador to the United Nations	Cunningham (2001)	Negroponte (2001–2004)	Danforth (2004–2005)	Patterson (2005)	Bolton (2005–2006)	Wolff (2006–2007)	Khalilzad (2007–2009)
Director of Central Intelligence	Tenet (2001–2004)		McLaughlin (2004)	Goss (2004–2005)	Discontinued (2005–2009)		
Director of National Intelligence	Not yet created (2001–2005)				Negroponte (2005–2007)		McConnell (2007–2009)
Director of the Central Intelligence Agency	Not yet created (2001–2005)				Goss (2005–2006)	Hayden (2006–2009)	
Assistant to the President for National Security Affairs	Rice (2001–2005)			Hadley (2005–2009)			
Deputy Assistant to the President for National Security Affairs	Hadley (2001–2005)				Crouch (2005–2007)		Jeffrey (2007–2008)
Trade Representative	Zoellick (2001–2005)				Allgeier (2005)	Sapiro (2005–2006)	Schwab (2006–2009)

== Approaching foreign policy ==
George W. Bush had little experience or interest in foreign policy prior to the presidency and his decisions were guided by his advisers. In a gaffe in 2000, for example, Bush confused Afghanistan's ruling Taliban with a musical band. Bush embraced the views of Cheney and other neoconservatives, who de-emphasized the importance of multilateralism; neoconservatives believed that because the United States was the world's lone superpower, it could act unilaterally if necessary. At the same time, Bush sought to enact the less interventionist foreign policy he had promised during the 2000 campaign. Also during the 2000 presidential campaign, Bush's foreign policy platform included support for stronger economic and political relationship with Latin America, especially Mexico, and a reduction of involvement in "nation-building" and other small-scale military engagements. Oliver argues that Bush was quickly influenced by ideologues who argued for unilateral action to establish US primacy in world affairs. They included Vice President Dick Cheney, Defense Secretary Donald Rumsfeld, and National Security Advisor Condoleezza Rice, – with Secretary of State Colin Powell as a non-ideological centrist.

=== September 11 attacks ===
President Bush addresses the nation from the Oval Office, regarding the terrorist attacks, September 11, 2001

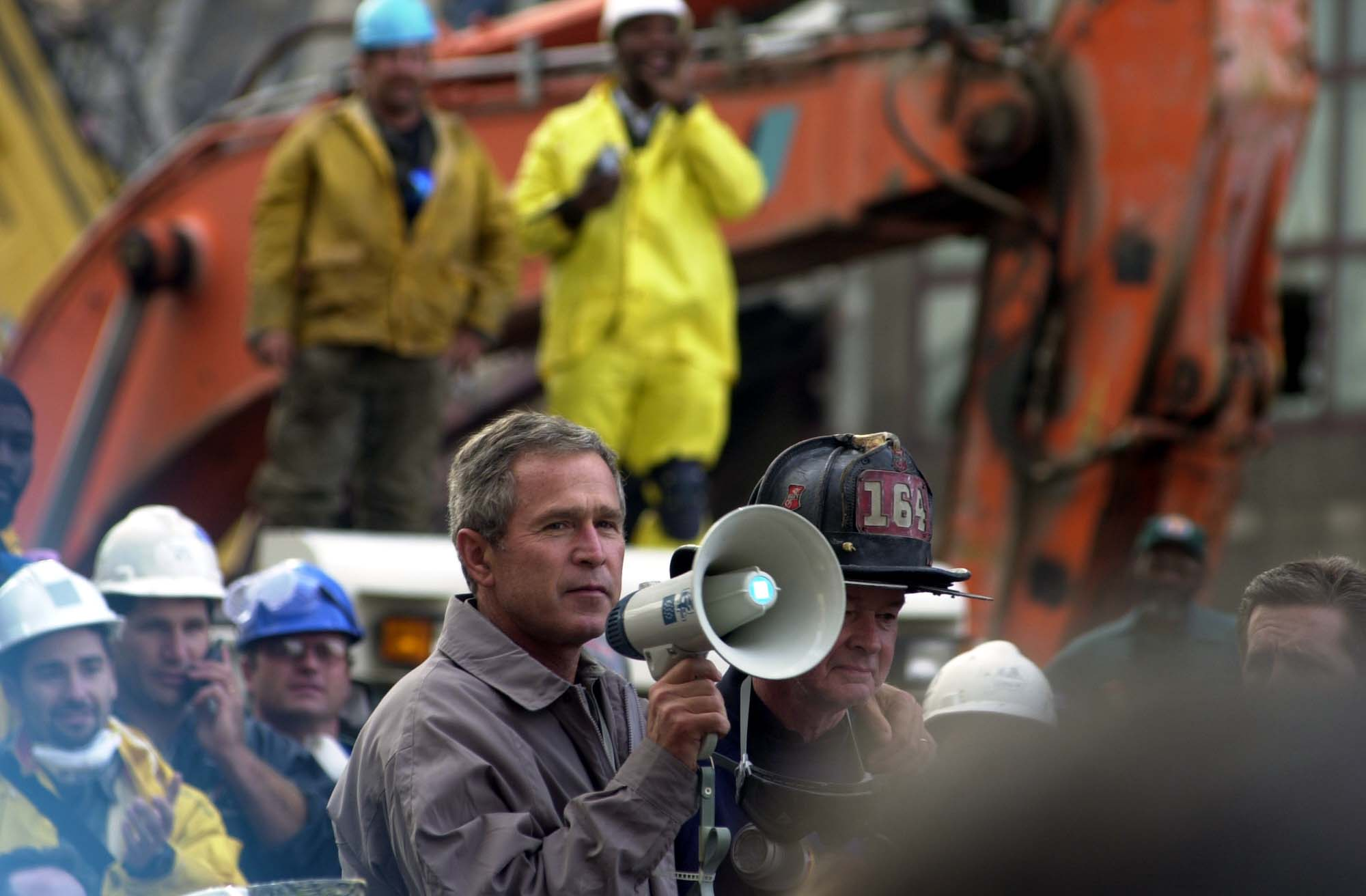
President Bush, standing with firefighter Bob Beckwith, addressing rescue workers at Ground Zero in New York, September 14, 2001

On September 11, 2001, two hijacked planes destroyed the World Trade Center in New York City, a third plane hit the Pentagon and a fourth crashed in a field in Pennsylvania after being averted by passengers from its target. These attacks were carried out by the Al-Qaeda terrorist organization led by mastermind Osama Bin Laden

On September 14, 2001, Congress passed legislation titled Authorization for Use of Military Force Against Terrorists, which was signed on September 18, 2001, by President Bush. It authorized the use of US Armed Forces against those responsible for the 9/11 attacks and those who harbored them.

The September 11 terrorist attacks were a major turning point in Bush's presidency. That evening, he addressed the nation from the Oval Office, promising a strong response to the attacks. He also emphasized the need for the nation to come together and comfort the families of the victims. Three days after the attacks, Bush visited Ground Zero and met with Mayor Rudy Giuliani, firefighters, police officers, and volunteers. To much applause, Bush addressed the gathering via a megaphone while standing in a heap of rubble: "I can hear you. The rest of the world hears you. And the people who knocked these buildings down will hear all of us soon."

President Bush delivers an address and declares "Freedom at War with Fear", September 20, 2001

In his address to a joint session of congress on September 20, 2001, President Bush condemned Osama bin Laden and his organization Al-Qaeda, and issued an ultimatum to the Taliban regime in Afghanistan, where bin Laden was operating, to "hand over the terrorists, or ... share in their fate".

Writing about changes to the US State Department in the wake of the September 11 attacks in a 2020 article in Foreign Affairs magazine, former Deputy Secretary of State William J. Burns and former Assistant Secretary of State Linda Thomas-Greenfield said, "Although the transformation of the State Department into a more expeditionary and agile institution was healthy in many respects, it was also distorting. It was tethered to a fundamentally flawed strategy—one that was too narrowly focused on terrorism and too wrapped up in magical thinking about the United States' supposed power to transform regions and societies."

=== Bush Doctrine ===
After the September 11 attacks, Bush's approval ratings increased tremendously. Bush decided to use his newfound political capital to fundamentally change U.S. foreign policy. He became increasingly focused on the possibility of a hostile country providing weapons of mass destruction (WMDs) to terrorist organizations. During his State of the Union Address in January 2002, Bush set forth what has become known as the Bush Doctrine, which held that the United States would implement a policy of preemptive military strikes against nations known to be harboring or aiding a terrorist organization hostile to the United States. Bush outlined what he called the "Axis of Evil", consisting of three nations that, he argued, posed the greatest threat to world peace due to their pursuit of weapons of mass destruction and potential to aid terrorists. The axis consisted of Iraq, North Korea and Iran. Bush also began emphasizing the importance of spreading democracy worldwide, stating in 2005 that "the survival of liberty in our land depends on the success of liberty in other land." Pursuant to this newly-interventionist policy, the Bush administration boosted foreign aid and increased defense expenditures. Defense spending rose from $304 billion in fiscal year 2001 to $616 billion in fiscal year 2008.

=== National missile defense ===
On December 13, 2001, President Bush announced the withdrawal of the United States from the 1972 Anti-Ballistic Missile Treaty, a bedrock of U.S.–Soviet nuclear stability during the Cold War era. Bush stated, "I have concluded the ABM treaty hinders our government's ability to develop ways to protect our people from future terrorist or rogue state missile attacks." According to the announcement, the withdrawal was to become effective six months from that date. The Bush administration pursued a national missile defense. The national missile defense project that Clinton introduced and Bush supported was designed to detect intercontinental ballistic missiles and destroy them in flight. Critics doubted that the project could ever work and said that it would cost US$53 billion from 2004 to 2009, being the largest single line item in the Pentagon's funding.

== Other issues ==
=== Environmental issues ===
In terms of international environmental policy, Daynes, and Sussman argues the son was less committed than the father, and neither was as successful as Bill Clinton. Many governments have criticized the failure of the United States to ratify the Kyoto Protocol, which was signed but not submitted for Senate ratification by the previous administration. Former President Bill Clinton recommended that his successor not submit the treaty for ratification until the wording was altered to reflect U.S. concerns. Bush, who was opposed to the treaty, rescinded U.S. executive approval from the proposed treaty. In 1997, prior to the Kyoto negotiations, the Byrd–Hagel Resolution passed in the U.S. Senate by a 95–0 vote. The resolution stated that the United States should not be a signatory to any protocol that did not include binding targets and timetables for developing nations as well as industrialized ones, or that seriously harm the American economy. Byron W. Daynes, and Glen Sussman conclude that Bush's policy had a "negative impact on the environment".

=== International Criminal Court ===
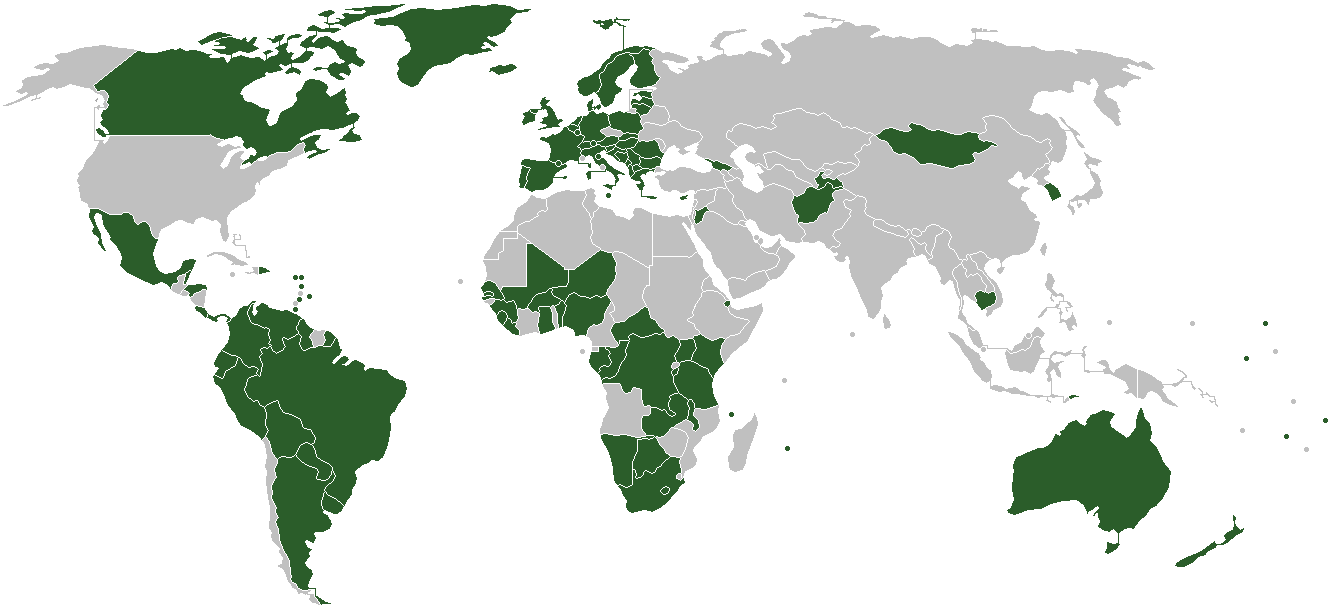
World map of ICC member states as of 2007

The International Criminal Court (ICC) came into being on July 1, 2002. The ICC is the first ever permanent, treaty based, international criminal court established to promote the rule of law and ensure that the gravest international crimes do not go unpunished.

Later that year, in August 2002, the American Servicemembers' Protection Act (ASPA) was passed by Congress with the stated intention "to protect United States military personnel and other elected and appointed officials of the United States government against criminal prosecution by an international criminal court to which the United States is not a party."

== International trips ==
Countries visited by President Bush during his time in office

The number of visits per country where he traveled are:

- One visit to Albania, Argentina, Austria, Bahrain, Benin, Botswana, Bulgaria, Chile, Croatia, Denmark, El Salvador, Estonia, Georgia, Ghana, Guatemala, Hungary, India, Kosovo, Kuwait, Liberia, Lithuania, Mongolia, Netherlands, Nigeria, Pakistan, Panama, Philippines, Portugal, Qatar, Rwanda, Senegal, Slovakia, South Africa, Spain, Sweden, Tanzania, Turkey, Uganda, Ukraine, United Arab Emirates, Uruguay, Vietnam, and the West Bank
- Two visits to Afghanistan, Australia, Belgium, Brazil, Colombia, Czech Republic, Indonesia, Ireland, Israel, Jordan, Latvia, Peru, Romania, Saudi Arabia, Singapore, Slovenia, and Thailand
- Three visits to Egypt, South Korea, and Poland
- Four visits to Canada, China, France, Iraq, and Japan
- Five visits to Germany, the United Kingdom, and Vatican City
- Six visits to Italy and Mexico
- Seven visits to Russia

== International trade ==
President Bush supported free trade policies and legislation but resorted to protectionist policies on occasion. Tariffs on imported steel imposed by the White House in March 2002 were lifted after the World Trade Organization (WTO) ruled them illegal. Bush explained that the safeguard measures had "achieved their purpose", and "as a result of changed economic circumstances", it was time to lift them. Bush used the authority he gained from the Trade Act of 2002 to push through bilateral trade agreements with several countries. Bush also sought to expand multilateral trade agreements through the WTO, but negotiations were stalled in the Doha Development Round for most of Bush's presidency. On August 31, 2004, WTO arbitrators authorized the European Union and other leading U.S. trade partners to impose economic sanctions against the United States for violation of global trade laws. The decision by the WTO was one of several cases where the U.S. was found to have been in breach of international trade rules.

However, Bush pursued and signed free trade agreements with several countries, including Australia, Bahrain, Chile, Colombia, Jordan, Morocco, Oman, Peru, Panama, Singapore, South Korea, Ukraine, and with six countries under the Central American Free Trade Agreement.

== Defense ==
=== Weapons of mass destruction ===
The Bush administration released its "National Strategy to Combat Weapons of Mass Destruction" in December 2002. The strategy includes three key elements: counterproliferation to combat the use of Weapons of Mass Destruction (WMD), strengthened nonproliferation to combat WMD proliferation, and consequence management to respond to WMD use. The classified version of this strategy reportedly reserved the right to use overwhelming force, including potentially nuclear weapons, in response to a WMD attack against the United States, its forces or allies.

In February 2004, in the context of recent revelations about clandestine nuclear programs in Iran and Libya, and the role of the A. Q. Khan network in proliferation of sensitive nuclear technology, Bush proposed seven initiatives:

1. Cooperation on law enforcement for interdiction of WMD trade, known as the Proliferation Security Initiative;
2. Passage of a UN Security Council Resolution requiring states to enact WMD-related controls, which led to UN Security Council Resolution 1540;
3. Expansion of the G8 Global Partnership to eliminate WMD and secure WMD materials worldwide;
4. Reliable access to nuclear fuel, accompanied by a ban on transfers of enrichment and reprocessing technology to countries that do not already have such facilities;
5. Making the International Atomic Energy Agency (IAEA) Additional Protocol a condition for nuclear supply, and ratification of the U.S. Additional Protocol;
6. Establishing a Special Committee of the IAEA Board of Governors on safeguards and verification to strengthen compliance and enforcement; and
7. Excluding countries under investigation for nonproliferation violations from serving on the Board or the Special Committee.

=== Defense spending ===
Of the US$2.4 trillion budgeted for 2005, about $450 billion was planned to be spent on defense. This level was generally comparable to the defense spending during the Cold War. Congress approved $87 billion for U.S. involvement in Iraq and Afghanistan in November, and had approved an earlier $79 billion package the previous spring. Most of the funds were for military operations in the two countries.

The ratio of defense spending of the U.S. and its allies to its potential adversaries, for the year 2000, was about 6 to 1.

== International organizations ==
In July 2002, Bush cut off all funding, approximately $34 million, for the United Nations Population Fund (UNFPA). This funding had been allocated by Congress the previous December. Bush claimed that the UNFPA supported forced abortions and sterilizations in China. His justification came from a group of members of Congress who oppose abortion and an anti-abortion organization called the Population Research Institute, which claimed to have obtained first-hand video taped evidence from victims of forced abortion and forced sterilization in counties where the UNFPA operates in China. This accusation has never been supported by any investigation, and has in fact been disproved by the US State Department, UK, and UN teams sent to examine UNFPA activities in China. The UNFPA points out that it "does not provide support for abortion services". Its charter includes a strong statement condemning coercion."

The Bush administration opposed the creation of the United Nations Human Rights Council to protest the repressive states among its membership.

=== UN peacekeeping ===
In the United States, the Clinton and Bush administrations started from opposite perspectives but came to adopt remarkably similar policies in support of peace operations as tools for American foreign policy. Initial positions formed by ideological concerns, were replaced by pragmatic decisions about how to support UN peace operations. Both administrations were reluctant to contribute large contingents of ground troops to UN-commanded operations, even as both administrations supported increases in the number and scale of UN missions.

The Clinton administration faced significant operational challenges. Instead of a liability, this was the tactical price of strategic success. American peace operations help transform its NATO alliance. The Bush administration started with a negative ideological attitude toward peace operations. However European and Latin American governments emphasized peace operations as strategically positive, especially regarding the use of European forces in Afghanistan and Lebanon. However American allies sometimes needed to flout their autonomy, even to the point of sacrificing operational efficiency, much to the annoyance of Washington.

== Foreign aid ==
On July 21, 2004, in a statement on the fiftieth anniversary of the Food for Peace program, Bush hailed the United States for feeding the hungry. Noting that "Millions are facing great affliction", he stated that "America has a special calling to come to their aid." After the 2004 election, however, the Bush administration told several private charities that it would not be honoring previous funding commitments. The shortfall, estimated at $100 million, forced the charities to suspend or eliminate programs that had already been approved to improve farming, education and health in order to promote self-sufficiency in poor countries.

While the United States continued to give large amounts of aid abroad, the Bush presidency was criticized for having a major impact upon the Millennium Development Goals project of the United Nations. Many nations, including key OECD members, were criticized for falling far short of their promise to give 0.7% of their GDP in order to drastically reduce poverty by the target date of 2015.

In his State of the Union Address in January 2003, Bush outlined a five-year strategy for global emergency AIDS relief, the President's Emergency Plan For AIDS Relief. The emergency relief effort was led by U.S. Ambassador Randall L. Tobias, former CEO of Eli Lilly and Global AIDS Coordinator at the Department of State. At the time of the speech, $9 billion was earmarked for new programs in AIDS relief for the 15 countries most affected by HIV/AIDS, another $5 billion for continuing support of AIDS relief in 100 countries where the U.S. already had bilateral programs established, and an additional $1 billion towards the Global Fund to Fight AIDS, Tuberculosis and Malaria. This budget represented more money contributed to fight AIDS globally than all other donor countries combined.

As the largest national economy in the world, the United States' leadership and commitment was seen as vital in addressing world poverty and ensuring implementation of the project, considered the most progressive and feasible to date for the United Nations or any other institution.

President Bush signed a multimillion-dollar aid deal with the government of Tanzania on February 17, 2008. Bush, cheering Liberians to rebound from Second Liberian Civil War that left their nation in ruins, said February 21, 2008, that the United States will keep lending a hand to make Liberia a symbol of liberty for Africa and the world. President Bush ordered the release of $200 million in emergency aid to help countries in Africa and elsewhere. Riots from Haiti to Bangladesh to Egypt over surging food prices catapulted the issue to the forefront of the world's attention.

== Criticisms and defenses ==
The Bush policies in the Middle East, especially Iraq, have come under intense criticism although there are some supporters as well. Bush supporters point to a range of more successful policies elsewhere in the world, as summarized by Hal Brands and Peter Feaver:

The administration successfully negotiated the Moscow Treaty, which codified mutually agreed upon deep cuts in the strategic arsenals. With respect to India, determined and creative engagement fostered a diplomatic breakthrough that brought New Delhi out of the 'nuclear ghetto' and fostered increased strategic cooperation with one of the world's most important rising powers. Regarding China, the Bush administration ...[maintained] generally stable relations with a rising Beijing. The administration also maintained positive ties with Japan, continuing the post-Cold War process of encouraging that country to broaden its defense and strategic horizons. And across the Asia-Pacific, the Bush administration continued to modernize US alliances and partnerships. ... The administration also established fairly productive relations with a rising Brazil in Latin America. ... [It] continued and expanded Plan Colombia, an aggressive counter-narcotics and counter-insurgency assistance plan that helped ... to reverse the trajectory of the Colombian civil war and make Bogota a key strategic partner in the region. ... In Africa, the administration's record was perhaps most transformative of all. ... Bush dramatically increased both the quantity and quality of foreign aid, doubling the aid budget and pushing forward important new reforms.

== Americas ==
=== Canada ===
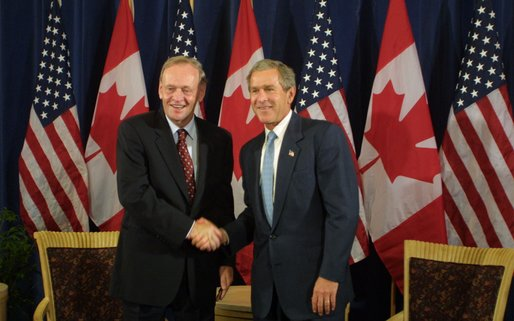
President Bush and Canadian Prime Minister Jean Chrétien, September 2002

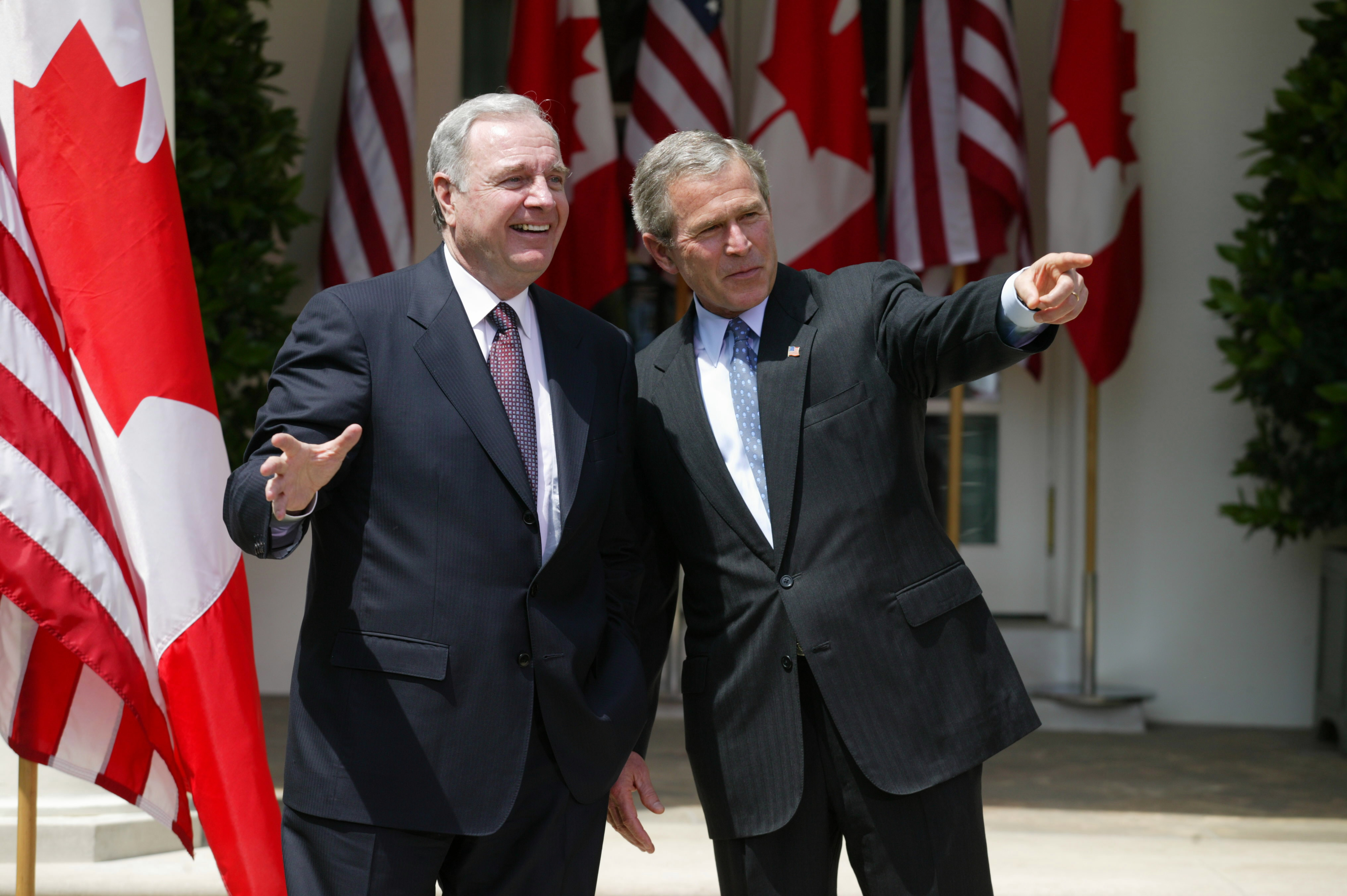
President Bush and Canadian Prime Minister Paul Martin, April 2004

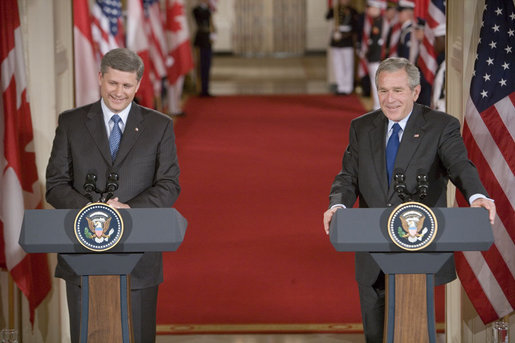
President Bush and Canadian Prime Minister Stephen Harper, July 2006

Canada's elite JTF2 unit joined American special forces in the U.S.-led coalition War in Afghanistan shortly after the al-Qaida attacks on September 11, 2001. Canadian forces joined the multinational coalition in Operation Anaconda in January 2002. On April 18, 2002, an American pilot bombed Canadian forces involved in a training exercise, killing four and wounding eight Canadians. A joint American-Canadian inquiry determined the cause of the incident to be pilot error, in which the pilot interpreted ground fire as an attack; the pilot ignored orders that he felt were "second-guessing" his field tactical decision. Canadian forces assumed a six-month command rotation of the International Security Assistance Force in 2003; in 2005, Canadians assumed operational command of the multi-national Brigade in Kandahar, with 2,300 troops, and supervises the Provincial Reconstruction Team in Kandahar, where al-Qaida forces are most active.

Relations between President Bush and Canadian Prime Minister Jean Chrétien were strained throughout their overlapping times in office. After the September 11 attacks terror attacks, Jean Chrétien publicly mused that U.S. foreign policy might be part of the "root causes" of terrorism. Some Americans criticized his "smug moralism", and Chrétien's public refusal to support the 2003 Iraq war was met with negative responses in the United States, especially among conservatives.

Prime Minister Chrétien said on October 10, 2002, that Canada would, in fact, be part of a military coalition to invade Iraq if it were sanctioned by the United Nations. However, when the United States and the United Kingdom subsequently withdrew their diplomatic efforts to gain that UN sanction, Jean Chrétien announced in Parliament on June 18, 2003, that Canada would not participate in the pending invasion. Nevertheless, he offered the US and its soldiers his moral support. However, according to classified U.S. documents released by WikiLeaks, a high-ranking Canadian official may have secretly promised to clandestinely support the invasion.

President Bush and newly elected Canadian Prime Minister Stephen Harper were thought to share warm personal relations and also close ties between their administrations. Because Bush was so unpopular among liberals in Canada (particularly in the media), this was underplayed by the Harper government.

Shortly after being congratulated by President Bush following his election victory in January 2006, Harper rebuked U.S. ambassador to Canada David Wilkins for criticizing the Conservatives' plans to assert Canada's sovereignty over the Arctic Ocean waters with military force.

=== Central American Free Trade Agreement ===
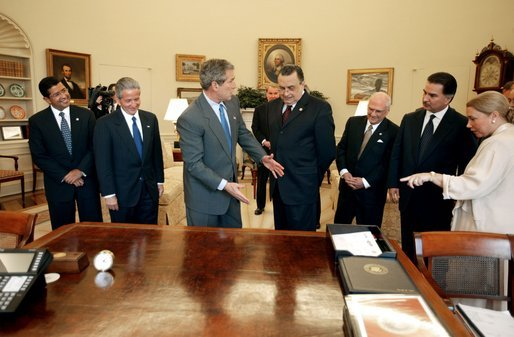
President Bush and Central American leaders, April 2003

The U.S. Senate approved the CAFTA-DR on June 30, 2005, by a vote of 54–45, and the U.S. House of Representatives approved the pact on July 28, 2005, by a vote of 217–215, with two representatives not voting. Controversy arose over this vote because it was held open 1 hour and 45 minutes longer than the normal 15 minutes in order to get some members to change their votes. For procedural reasons, the Senate took a second vote on CAFTA on July 28 and the pact garnered an additional vote from Sen. Joe Lieberman—who had been absent on June 30—in favor of the agreement. The implementing legislation became Public Law 109-053 when it was signed by Bush on August 2, 2005.

The Dominican Republic, Costa Rica, El Salvador, Guatemala, Nicaragua, and Honduras have also approved the agreement. They are all the current members of CAFTA-DR.

El Salvador became the first country to formally implement CAFTA, which went into effect on March 1, 2006, when the Organization of American States (OAS) received signed copies of the treaty. On April 1, 2006, Honduras and Nicaragua fully implemented the agreement. On May 18, 2006, the Congress of Guatemala ratified CAFTA-DR, which went into effect on July 1, 2006. The Dominican Republic implemented the agreement on March 1, 2007. In a referendum on October 7, 2007, Costa Rica narrowly backed the free trade agreement, with 51.6% voting "Yes"; the agreement took effect on January 1, 2009.

=== Chile ===
President Bush signed the United States-Chile Free Trade Agreement signed on June 6, 2003. The pact came into force on January 1, 2004. On that date, tariffs on 90% of U.S. exports to Chile and 95% of Chilean exports to the United States were eliminated. The agreement also established that Chile and the U.S. will establish duty-free trade in all products within a maximum of 12 years (2016). In 2009, bilateral trade between the United States and Chile reached US$15.4 billion, a 141% increase over bilateral trade levels before the U.S.-Chile FTA took effect. In particular, U.S. exports to Chile in 2009 showed a 248% increase over pre-FTA levels.

=== Mexico ===
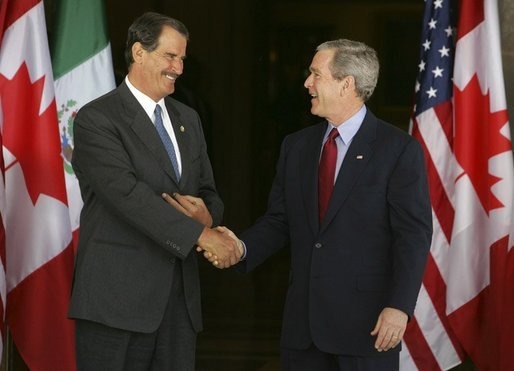
President Bush and Mexican President Vicente Fox, March 2005

During Fox's administration, Mexico pushed for "comprehensive" reform of U.S. immigration law that addressed the problem of Illegal immigration to the United States. The issue had been called "The Whole Enchilada" by Fox's administration, which stated that "immigration reform in the United States should address mutual border problems, the rights of undocumented immigrants, and the development of regions in Mexico that 'expel' migrants". However, according to former U.S. ambassador to Mexico Jeffrey Davidow, all discussions between the parties on immigration were informal.

The immigration reform that Fox sought included a guest worker plan. Fox said, "The best thing that can happen to both our countries is to have an orderly flow, a controlled flow, of migration to the United States". This reform was supported by President Bush and approved by the U.S. Senate, however, the bill was rejected by the House of Representatives. According to the Washington Post, the hopes were complicated by the recent approval of the SBI (Secure Border Initiative), a bill that includes building a 700-mile (1,100 km) triple fence between the U.S. and Mexico.

During Fox's presidency the net migration rate in Mexico increased 152% from −2.84 migrants per 1,000 inhabitants to −4.32; in the same period, population growth decreased 35% from 1.57% to 1.16%. Fox, who was said to be "proud" of Mexican immigrants in the U.S. has acknowledged the importance of remittances by both legal and illegal Mexican workers in the U.S. (now the #1 source of revenue for the country).

During the country's tenure as a rotating member of the UN Security Council, Mexico did not support the U.S-led 2003 invasion of Iraq.

=== Peru ===
On November 18, 2003, the U.S. Trade Representative, Robert Zoellick, notified Congress of the intention of the Bush administration to initiate negotiations for a free trade agreement with the countries involved in the Andean trade act. Negotiations started without Bolivia in May 2004, however, as each of the three remaining Andean countries decided to pursue bilateral agreements with the United States. After 13 rounds of negotiations, Peru and the United States concluded an agreement on December 7, 2005. Alfredo Ferrero, Peruvian Minister of Foreign Trade and Tourism, and the U.S. Trade Representative Rob Portman signed the deal on April 12, 2006, in Washington, D.C., in the presence of Peruvian President Alejandro Toledo.

The Congress of Peru debated the agreement for six hours during the night of June 27, 2006, and ratified it in the early hours of the next day. The vote was 79–14, with seven abstentions. The U.S. House of Representatives approved the agreement on November 8, 2007, with a 285–132 vote. The U.S. Senate approved the agreement on December 4, 2007, with a 77–18 vote. The implementation bills gained wide support from the Republican Party (176–16 in the House, 47–1 in the Senate) and split backing from the Democratic Party (109–116 and 29–17).

On January 16, 2009, Bush signed a proclamation To Implement the United States-Peru Trade Promotion Agreement and for Other Purposes, effective February 1, 2009.

== Asia ==
=== ASEAN ===
President Bush simultaneously improved relations with India, Japan, South Korea, China, and ASEAN. Bush confirmed that he would be attending the Association of Southeast Asian Nations (ASEAN) conference for the first time during his presidency in 2007. However, he did not attend the conference due to American opposition to the government of Myanmar at the time.

=== China ===
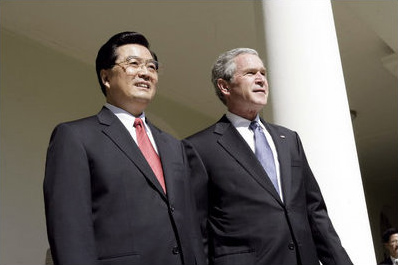
President Bush and Chinese leader Hu Jintao, April 2006

The Bush administration's policy towards China faced the difficult task of sustaining the cooperative US-China relationship in the context of China's rise. China's success in economic development since the 1979 reforms had allowed Beijing to transform growing Chinese material wealth into political and military power. Robert Zoellick, serving in Bush's cabinet as US Trade Representative and Deputy Secretary of State, once underlined that "China is big, it is growing, and it will influence the world in the years ahead. At the end of his second term, President Bush had successfully managed to establish significant elements of US-China cooperation and build a record of cooperation with a rising China while achieving US national interests. During his presidential campaign, Bush revealed his disagreement with the Clinton administration's view of China as "a competitor, not a strategic partner. While seeing China as a power in transition and asserting that if China became a friend of the US, "that friendship will steady the world. But if not, the peace we seek may not be found", Bush warned that China would be "respected as a great power ... unthreatened, but not unchecked", under his administration.

Bush became increasingly concerned about China's growing economic and political influence in the world, often labelled as 'China's rise', and its implications for US primacy and interests. President Bush believed that China's rise was an inevitable phenomenon that the United States had to manage. He strived to build a "constructive, candid, and cooperative" relationship with China. This, in Bush's viewpoint, would form a sturdy basis for the US to advance engagement with China. In fact, Bush's determination to increase cooperation with China led to "the best relations since 1972.

The Bush administration had made efforts to embed the Chinese economy in the international economic system, assist Chinese economic development and share the mutual economic benefits between the two nations. In 2001, despite a confrontation between Washington and Beijing over the downed EP-3E Aries II spy plane which collided with a Chinese fighter jet, President Bush still declared his support for China's entry into the World Trade Organization. He said, "I'm an advocate of China's entry into the WTO", stressing that "China ought to be a trading partner of ours. I think it is in our economic interests to open up the Chinese markets to U.S. products, to U.S. agricultural products".

Also, President Bush actively supported permanent normalized trade relations with China. In his view, American farmers and businessmen would gain better benefits from freer access to the large Chinese market. He therefore asked the US Congress to extend normalized trade relations with China in 2001: "Fair trade is essential not only to improving living standards for Americans but also for a strong and productive relationship with China." President Bush and his team believed that trading with China would be a good thing for the US and Chinese economies. Integrating China into the world economy would ultimately lead to the promotion of human dignity in China and the emergence of a good China. In her 2000 article entitled "Promoting the National Interest" Condoleezza Rice, Bush's Secretary of State, wrote: President Bush's efforts to build a cooperative relationship with China can also be seen in his way of maintaining frank and productive relations with Chinese leaders. In 2002–2003 the Severe Acute Respiratory Syndrome (SARS) broke out in China. There were up to 5,327 infections and 348 deaths in China. While the Chinese leadership had been criticized for its handling of the SARS outbreak, President Bush praised his Chinese counterpart for being open about this transnational epidemic. President Bush's public support for President Hu in that critical moment was highly appreciated by the Chinese president and contributed to building cooperative leader-to-leader relations between the United States and China.

In the mid-2000s, the United States focused relatively less on China issues. This approach was reinforced by the economic benefits to the United States from its relations with China, including cheaper consumer products like clothing and electronics. During this period, the United States also issued significant debt to fund its military interventions and China became the largest foreign purchaser of U.S. government debt.

President Bush called Chinese President Hu Jintao March 26, 2008, to express his concern about China's crackdown on protesters in Tibet since March 10, 2008. Bush and Hu also discussed issues including Taiwan, North Korea's denuclearization and Myanmar.

=== India ===
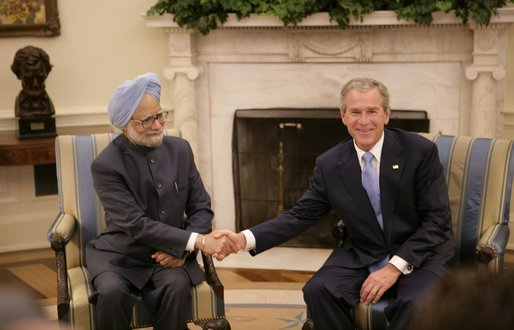
President Bush and Indian Prime Minister Manmohan Singh, July 2005

Relations with India improved significantly during Bush's tenure. In September 2001, President Bush removed sanctions which had been imposed.

During the tenure of the George W. Bush administration, relations between India and the United States were seen to have blossomed, primarily over common concerns regarding growing Islamic extremism, energy security, and climate change. Bush commented, "India is a great example of democracy. It is very devout, has diverse religious heads, but everyone is comfortable about their religion. The world needs India". Fareed Zakaria, in his book The Post-American World, described Bush as "being the most pro-Indian president in American history." Similar sentiments are echoed by Rejaul Karim Laskar, a scholar of Indian foreign policy and ideologue of India's Congress Party – the largest constituent of the UPA. According to Laskar, the UPA rule has seen a "transformation in bilateral ties with the US", as a result of which the relations now covers "a wide range of issues, including high technology, space, education, agriculture, trade, clean energy, counter-terrorism, etc.".

After the December 2004 tsunami, the US and Indian navies cooperated in search and rescue operations and in the reconstruction of affected areas.

Since 2004, Washington and New Delhi have been pursuing a "strategic partnership" that is based on shared values and generally convergent geopolitical interests. Numerous economic, security, and global initiatives – including plans for civilian nuclear cooperation – are underway. This latter initiative, first launched in 2005, reversed three decades of American non-proliferation policy. Also in 2005, the United States and India signed a ten-year defence framework agreement, with the goal of expanding bilateral security cooperation. The two countries engaged in numerous and unprecedented combined military exercises, and major US arms sales to India were concluded. An Open Skies Agreement was signed in April 2005, enhancing trade, tourism, and business via the increased number of flights, and Air India purchased 68 US Boeing aircraft at a cost of $8 billion. The United States and India also signed a bilateral Agreement on Science and Technology Cooperation in 2005. After Hurricane Katrina, India donated $5 million to the American Red Cross and sent two planeloads of relief supplies and materials to help. Then, on March 1, 2006, President Bush made another diplomatic visit to further expand relations between India and the U.S.

=== Japan ===
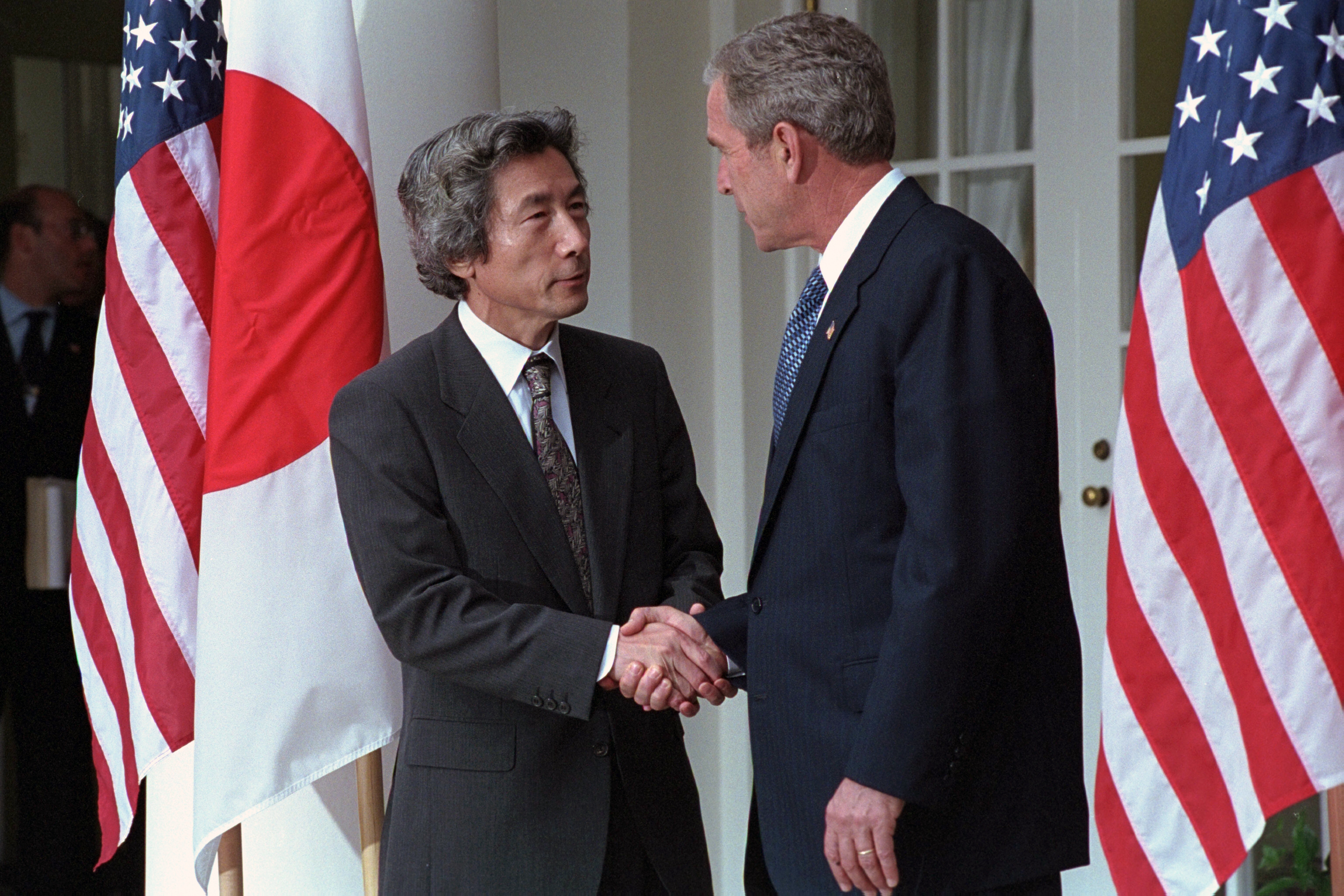
President Bush and Japanese Prime Minister Junichiro Koizumi, September 2001

During Bush's visit to Japan, In his address to the Japanese parliament in February 2002, President Bush expressed his gratitude to Japan for supporting the US in the war on terror, and asserting that the Japanese response to the terrorist threat showed the strength of the US-Japan alliance and "the indispensable role of Japan, a role that is global, and begins in Asia". President Bush also convinced members of Japan's parliament that the 21st century would be "the Pacific century", and committed to giving support to Japan. The Bush administration made important progress in deepening US-Japan security cooperation. Under Bush, bilateral security initiatives between the United States and Japan were centred on counter-terrorism cooperation. President Bush endorsed the idea that Japan should play a more active international role and praised Japan for its passage of the Anti-Terrorism Special Measures Law that allowed Japan to send refuelling tankers to the Indian Ocean to assist US-led operations in Afghanistan in 2001. On December 9, 2003, the Japanese Diet passed the Humanitarian Relief and Iraqi Reconstruction Special Measures Law that allowed Prime Minister Koizumi to dispatch the Self Defence Forces (SDF) to Iraq. In January 2004, Japan sent a total of 1,000 military personnel (including 550 Ground Self-Defence Force personnel and 450 Maritime Self-Defence Force and Air Self- Defence Force personnel) to Iraq to provide humanitarian assistance and take part in reconstruction activities. This was the first time in the post-war period Japanese troops were sent overseas without an inter- national mandate. Japan withdrew its ground forces in 2006 while a Japanese self-defence forces air division stayed in Iraq until the expiration of the UN authorisation for multilateral forces in Iraq in 2008. Indeed, under Bush, military cooperation between Washington and Tokyo in Afghanistan and Iraq became a new dimension and a symbol of their alliance.

=== North Korea ===
Bush publicly condemned Kim Jong-il of North Korea and identified North Korea as one of the three states in an "axis of evil" in his 2002 State of the Union Address. He said that "the United States of America will not permit the world's most dangerous regimes to threaten us with the world's most destructive weapons." and that "North Korea is a regime arming with missiles and weapons of mass destruction, while starving its citizens" Within months, "both countries had walked away from their respective commitments under the U.S.–DPRK Agreed Framework of October 1994." President Bush in his 2005 State of the Union Address, stated that "We're working closely with the governments in Asia to convince North Korea to abandon its nuclear ambitions" and that "In the next 4 years, my administration will continue to build the coalitions that will defeat the dangers of our time". North Korea's October 9, 2006, detonation of a nuclear device further complicated Bush's foreign policy, which centered for both terms of his presidency on "[preventing] the terrorists and regimes who seek chemical, biological, or nuclear weapons from threatening the United States and the world". Bush condemned North Korea's position, reaffirmed his commitment to "a nuclear-free Korean Peninsula", and said that "transfer of nuclear weapons or material by North Korea to states or non-state entities would be considered a grave threat to the United States", for which North Korea would be held accountable.

North Korea had developed weapons of mass destruction for several years prior to Bush's inauguration, and the Clinton administration had sought to trade economic assistance for an end to the North Korean WMD program. Though Secretary of State Powell urged the continuation of the rapprochement, other administration officials, including Vice President Cheney, were more skeptical of the good faith of the North Koreans. Bush instead sought to isolate North Korea in the hope that the regime would eventually collapse.

North Korea launched missile tests on July 5, 2006, leading to United Nations Security Council Resolution 1695. The country said on October 3, 2006 "The U.S. extreme threat of a nuclear war and sanctions and pressure compel the DPRK to conduct a nuclear test", which the Bush administration denied and denounced. Days later on October 9, 2006, North Korea followed through on its promise to test nuclear weapons. On October 14, 2006, the Security Council unanimously passed United Nations Security Council Resolution 1718, sanctioning North Korea for the test. In the waning days of his presidency, Bush attempted to re-open negotiations with North Korea, but North Korea continued to develop its nuclear programs.

On May 7, 2007, North Korea agreed to shut down its nuclear reactors immediately pending the release of frozen funds held in a foreign bank account. This was a result of a series of three-way talks initiated by the United States and including China. On September 2, 2007, North Korea agreed to disclose and dismantle all its nuclear programs by the end of 2007.

=== Singapore ===
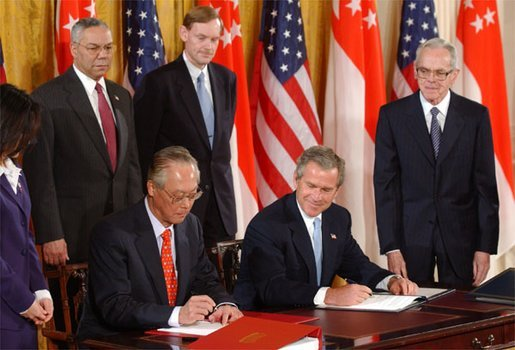
President Bush and Singaporean Prime Minister Goh Chok Tong signing the free trade agreement, May 2003

President Bush and Singaporean Prime Minister Goh Chok Tong signed a bilateral free trade agreement on May 6, 2003; the agreement entered into force on January 1, 2004. The growth of U.S. investment in Singapore and the large number of Americans living there enhance opportunities for contact between Singapore and the United States.

=== South Korea ===
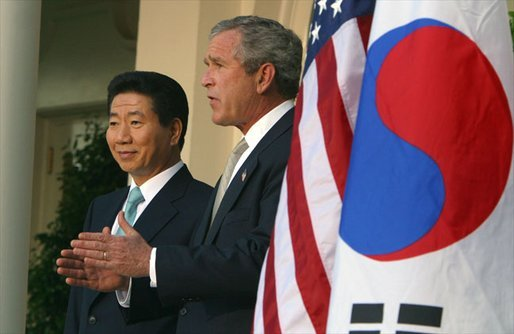
President Bush and South Korean President Roh Moo-hyun, May 2003

President Bush simultaneously improved relations with South Korea. On February 20, 2002, during President Bush's visit to South Korea, Bush and South Korean President Kim Dae-jung recognized that the South Korea-U.S. alliance is indispensable not only for stability on the Korean Peninsula but also in Northeast Asia as a whole. Furthermore, President Bush and Kim Dae-Jung expressed satisfaction that the bilateral alliance is not limited to cooperation in security matters but that the comprehensive partnership has expanded and developed to all areas, including political, economic, and diplomatic arenas. President Bush and president Kim Dae-jung exchanged views about the war against terrorism and future course of action. and Dae-Jung praised President Bush for the success in the war against terrorism under his outstanding leadership and indicated that South Korea as an ally would do its utmost to cooperate and provide full support. In December 2001, South Korea deployed troops to the U.S.-led War in Afghanistan. Afterwards, South Korea took only the role of providing medical and vocational training by assisting the United States with only two dozen volunteers working inside Bagram Air Base, north of Kabul. According to an ISAF statement, on June 30, 2008, South Korea returned, operating a small hospital near the airbase in Bagram with military and civilian personnel. In February 2004, South Korea deployed troops to Iraq as part of the coalition forces to provide support to U.S. forces in the Iraq War, which was also another boost in U.S.-ROK Relations.

=== Taiwan ===
Bush's hostile position toward China in the 2000 campaign and early months of his presidency was suddenly reversed after 9/11, and his especially friendly attitude toward Taiwan became a casualty. During his campaign Bush had warned that Clinton was too friendly with China, which he saw as a strategic competitor. Early on as president Bush increased arms sales to Taiwan, including 8 submarines. He was asked on April 25, 2001, "if Taiwan were attacked by China, do we [The U.S.] have an obligation to defend the Taiwanese?" He responded, "Yes, we do ... and the Chinese must understand that. The United States would do whatever it took to help Taiwan defend herself." He made it understood that "though we have common interests, the Chinese must understand that there will be some areas where we disagree." However, on the advice of Rice and Powell, he later explained that he was not changing America's historical relationships. The shock of 9/11 force Bush to move closer to China. Soon he was calling China a strategic partner in the war on terror and postponing deals with Taiwan.

Taiwan's leadership was increasingly nervous in the early 21st century. It had to deal with growing isolation around the world because of China's pressure on other countries. In economic terms, it was facing worsening trade relationships with major trading partners. According to Chen-Don Tso, Taiwan was unable to make free trade agreements with them. Its main goal was to reach an explicit partnership with the United States. However, repeated efforts by Taiwan especially in 2003 to 2006 were rejected by Washington, in its quest to improve relations with Beijing.

== Europe ==
=== Historical background ===
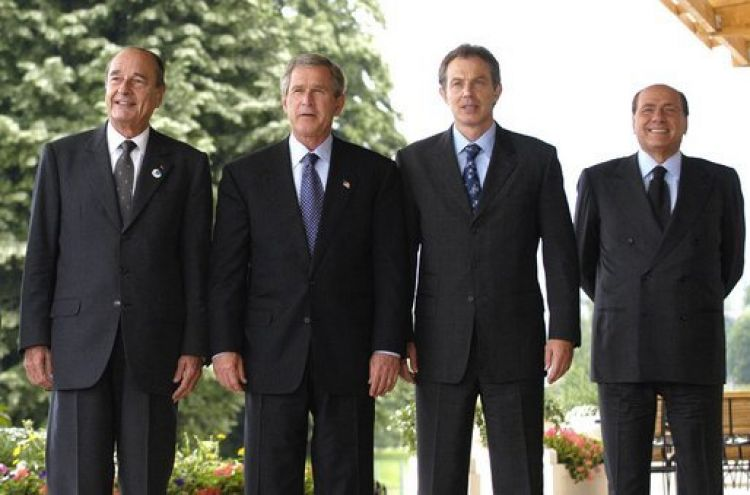
From left: French President Jacques Chirac, President Bush, British Prime Minister Tony Blair and Italian Prime minister Silvio Berlusconi at the G8 Summit at Evian, France. Chirac was against the invasion, the other three leaders were in favor of it.

President Bush made his first visit to Europe in June 2001. Bush came under criticism from European leaders for the rejection of the Kyoto Protocol, which was aimed at reducing carbon dioxide emissions that contribute to global warming. He asserted that the Kyoto Protocol is "unfair and ineffective" because it would exempt 80 percent of the world and "cause serious harm to the U.S. economy". Post September 11, President Bush worked closely with his NATO allies in Europe, to fight against the Taliban and Al-Qaeda, in Afghanistan. However, after the 2003 Invasion of Iraq, relations were strained with France and Germany, who strongly opposed the invasion. But President Bush had an excellent relationship with Tony Blair of Britain and Silvio Berlusconi of Italy, which took part in the wars in both Iraq and Afghanistan. Bush began his second term with an emphasis on improving strained relations with European nations. Bush lauded the pro-democracy struggles in Georgia and Ukraine. However, Nursultan Nazarbayev of Kazakhstan and Ilham Aliyev of Azerbaijan, both undemocratically elected and fiercely autocratic, received official state visits to the White House, along with increased economic and military assistance. The President had encouraged both leaders to hold free and fair elections early on in his second term, but in fact neither leader carried out significant reforms.

=== Belarus ===
President Bush signed the Belarus Democracy Act of 2004 on October 20, 2004, to impose sanctions on the Belarus government of Alexander Lukashenko. The law expresses the sense of Congress that the Belarusian authorities should not receive various types of non-humanitarian financial aid from the U.S. It also calls for the President to report to Congress on arms sales by Belarus to state sponsors of terrorism and on the personal wealth and assets of senior Belarus officials. President Bush said in his signing statement of October 20, 2004, "will work with our allies and partners to assist those seeking to return Belarus to its rightful place among the Euro-Atlantic community of democracies."

In June 2006, President Bush issued executive order to freeze the US assets of hard-line Belarus President Alexander Lukashenko and nine other individuals deemed obstacles to democracy in the former Soviet republic. "There is simply no place in a Europe whole and free for a regime of this kind", Bush said in a letter to the US Congress announcing his executive order, which affects assets held in the United States or by US financial institutions.

On December 8, 2006, the United States House of Representatives passed, and (following Senate enactment) on January 12, 2007, President Bush signed into law, the Belarus Democracy Reauthorization Act of 2006, a statute amending and updating the act.

=== Czech Republic ===
President Bush enjoyed a strong relationship with President of the Czech Republic Vaclav Havel. On January 30, 2003, Havel signed The letter of the eight supporting the U.S. led 2003 invasion of Iraq. Havel also deployed Czech forces in the Iraq War as part the Coalition forces in May 2003.

Havel's successor Václav Klaus, also deployed Czech forces in the U.S. led coalition War in Afghanistan in 2004.

=== Denmark ===
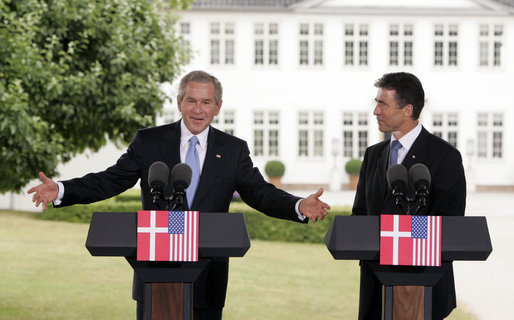
President Bush and Danish Prime Minister Anders Fogh Rasmussen, July 2005

President Bush and Danish Prime Minister Anders Fogh Rasmussen enjoyed a strong friendship. Denmark with Rasmussen, deployed forces to the U.S.-led war in Afghanistan in 2001 as part of NATO forces in the International Security Assistance Force. Rasmussen strongly supported the 2003 Iraq War and was one of the signatories of The letter of the eight on January 30, 2003. As in most European countries he faced considerable opposition, both in the parliament and in the general population. Subsequent opinion polls suggested the Danish population's opinion was split on the issue. One vocal protester managed to get into the Danish parliament during the period before the war, where he poured red paint on the prime minister while yelling "Du har blod på dine hænder" (literally: "You have blood on your hands"). A member of the Danish parliament for the socialist Red-Green Alliance, Pernille Rosenkrantz-Theil, stated that it was a reaction she might have made under the circumstances, although she later denounced such behaviour. Denmark was one of only five countries to take part in the actual invasion operations (the others being the U.S., UK, Poland and Australia) though the contingent mainly consisted of two minor warships and staff and radio units that were never involved in actual combat. In the months after the initial phase of the war, Danish troops participated in the multi-national force stationed in Iraq. Approximately 550 Danish troops were stationed in Iraq from 2004 and into 2007, first at "Camp Dannevang" and later at "Camp Einherjer", both near Basra. When the contingent of troops left around August 2007, it was not replaced and Denmark shifted its focus to non-military support around Baghdad. The official reason provided is that the Iraqi government should now be able to handle security in the Basra area. Critics of Rasmussen argued that the withdrawal was motivated by decreasing domestic support for the war.

=== France ===
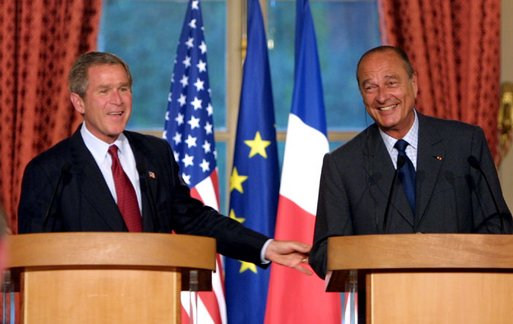
President Bush and French President Jacques Chirac, May 2002

France with President Jacques Chirac deployed French forces to NATO's U.S. led-coalition war in Afghanistan in 2001, but relations with France became strained after Chirac emerged as a leading voice against Bush and Tony Blair in 2003 during the organization and deployment of American and British forces participating in a military coalition to forcibly remove the government of Iraq controlled by the Ba'ath Party under the leadership of Saddam Hussein. Despite British and American pressure, Chirac threatened to veto, at that given point, a resolution in the UN Security Council that would authorise the use of military force to rid Iraq of alleged weapons of mass destruction, and rallied other governments to his position. "Iraq today does not represent an immediate threat that justifies an immediate war", Chirac said on March 18, 2003. French foreign minister Dominique de Villepin acquired much of his popularity for his speech against the war at the United Nations (UN).

=== Germany ===
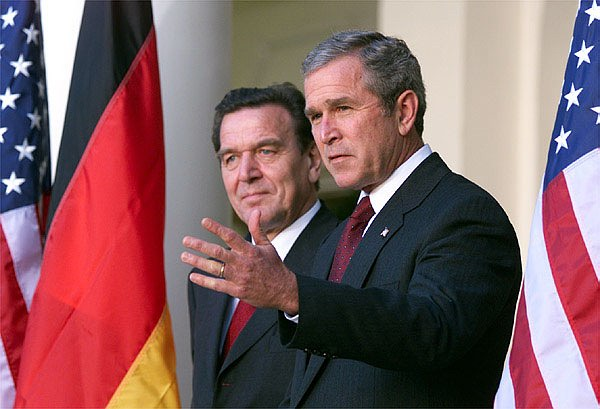
President Bush and German Chancellor Gerhard Schröder, October 2001

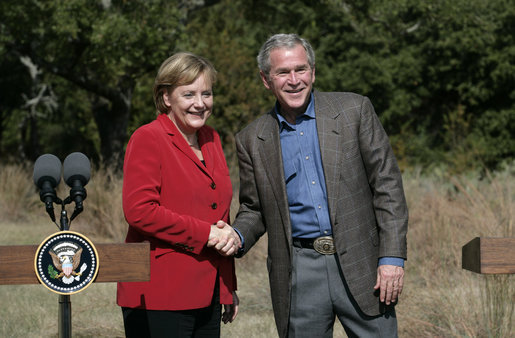
President Bush and German Chancellor Angela Merkel, November 2007

German Chancellor Gerhard Schröder sent forces to Afghanistan as part of NATO operations of the U.S. led war in Afghanistan because due to Germany having a long experience with terrorism itself, Schröder declared solidarity with the United States after the September 11 attacks in 2001. When Schröder left office, Germany had 2,000 troops in Afghanistan, the largest contingent from any nation other than the United States, UK, France, Canada and after two years Afghanistan.

However, relations with Germany became strained, after Schröder later spoke out strongly against the 2003 invasion of Iraq and refused any military assistance in that enterprise. Schröder's stance caused political friction between the US and Germany, in particular because he used this topic for his 2002 election campaign. Schröder's stance set the stage for alleged anti-American statements by members of the SPD. The parliamentary leader of the SPD, Ludwig Stiegler, compared Bush to Julius Caesar while Schröder's Minister of Justice, Herta Däubler-Gmelin, likened Bush's foreign policy to that of Adolf Hitler. Schröder's critics accused him of enhancing, and campaigning on, anti-American sentiments in Germany. After his 2002 re-election, Schröder and Bush rarely met and their animosity was seen as a widening political gap between the US and Europe. Bush stated in his memoirs that Schröder initially promised to support the Iraq war but changed his mind with the upcoming German elections and public opinion strongly against the invasion, to which Schröder responded saying that Bush was "not telling the truth". When asked in March 2003 if he were at all self-critical about his position on Iraq, Schröder replied, "I very much regret there were excessive statements" from himself and former members of his government (which capitalised on the war's unpopularity).

=== Italy ===
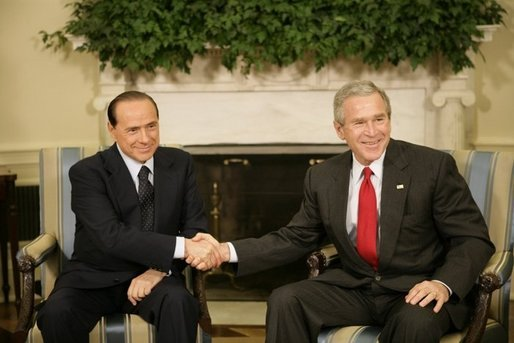
President Bush and Italian Prime Minister Silvio Berlusconi, October 2005

President Bush enjoyed a strong relationship with Italian Prime Minister Silvio Berlusconi. Italy, with Berlusconi in office, became a solid ally of the United States due to his support in deploying Italian troops in the War in Afghanistan and the Iraq War following the 2003 invasion of Iraq in the war on terror. On January 30, 2003, Berlusconi signed The letter of the eight supporting US. policy on Iraq.

Berlusconi, in his meetings with United Nations Secretary-General Kofi Annan and President Bush, said that he pushed for "a clear turnaround in the Iraqi situation" and for a quick handover of sovereignty to the government chosen by the Iraqi people. Italy had some 3,200 troops deployed in Southern Iraq, the third largest contingent there after the American and British forces. When Romano Prodi became Prime Minister, Italian troops were gradually withdrawn from Iraq in the second half of 2006 with the last soldiers leaving the country in December of that year.

=== NATO ===
In November 2002, at a NATO summit Bush stated "Our NATO alliance faces dangers very different from those it was formed to confront. Yet, never has our need for collective defense been more urgent. The Soviet Union is gone, but freedom still has enemies. We're threatened by terrorism, bred within failed states, it's present within our own cities. We're threatened by the spread of chemical and biological and nuclear weapons which are produced by outlaw regimes and could be delivered either by missile or terrorist cell. For terrorists and terrorist states, every free nation is a potential target, including the free nations of Europe".

Bush then stated "To meet all of this century's emerging threats from terror camps in remote regions to hidden laboratories of outlaw regimes, NATO must develop new military capabilities. NATO forces must become better able to fight side by side. Those forces must be more mobile and more swiftly deployed. The allies need more special operations forces, better precision strike capabilities, and more modern command structures. Few NATO members will have state-of-the-art capabilities in all of these areas; I recognize that. But every nation should develop some. Ours is a military alliance, and every member must make a military contribution to that alliance. For some allies, this will require higher defense spending. For all of us, it will require more effective defense spending, with each nation adding the tools and technologies to fight and win a new kind of war".

Bush then stated "The United States proposes the creation of a NATO response force that will bring together well-equipped, highly ready air, ground and sea forces from NATO allies – old and new. This force will be prepared to deploy on short notice wherever it is needed. A NATO response force will take time to create and we should begin that effort here in Prague. Yet, security against new threats requires more than just new capabilities. Free nations must accept our shared obligations to keep the peace. The world needs the nations of this continent to be active in the defense of freedom; not inward-looking or isolated by indifference. Ignoring dangers or excusing aggression may temporarily avert conflict, but they don't bring true peace".

=== Poland ===
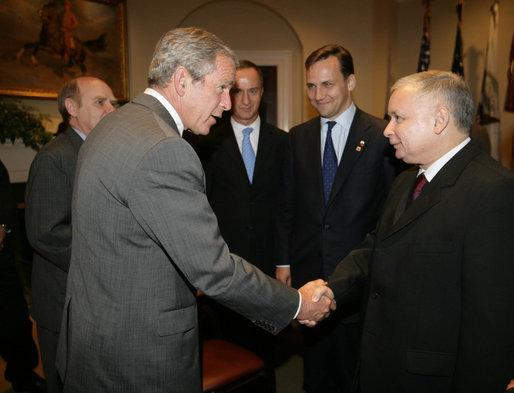
President Bush and Polish Prime Minister Jarosław Kaczyński, 2007

President Bush enjoyed a strong relationship with Poland, As well as Poland deploying its forces in supporting the global war on terror, Operation Enduring Freedom in Afghanistan, and coalition efforts in Iraq (where Polish contingent was one of the largest). Polish Prime Minister Leszek Miller's government, together with President Kwaśniewski, made a decision in March 2003 to join the coalition of the willing and deploy Polish troops to Iraq, targeting at overthrowing Saddam Hussein's government. Leszek Miller was also a co-signatory of "the letter of 8", signed by eight European prime ministers, supporting the US position on Iraq. Already in 2002 Miller gave permission to the U.S. government to run a secret CIA prison at Stare Kiejkuty military training center, three hours North of Warsaw. Years later he is facing accusations of acting anti-constitutionally by having tolerated the imprisonment and torture of prisoners.

=== Russia ===
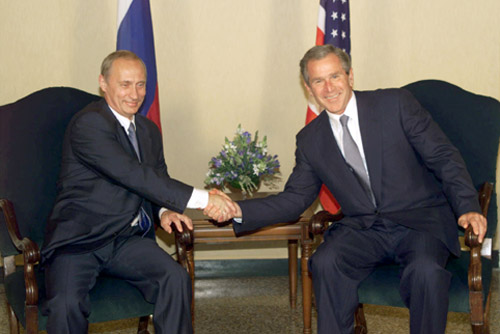
President Bush and Russian President Vladimir Putin, July 2001

A planned missile defense system in Eastern Europe poses no threat to Russia, Bush, said April 1, 2008, responding to concerns that the U.S. might use interceptor missiles for offensive purposes. His comments came before he left Kyiv for a NATO summit in Bucharest, Romania, that is expected to highlight divisions over the plan. Russian President Vladimir Putin and Bush failed to resolve their differences over U.S. plans for the planned missile defense system based in Poland and the Czech Republic, on their meeting in the Russian Black Sea resort of Sochi on April 6, 2008, but said they had agreed a "strategic framework" to guide future U.S.-Russian relations, in which Russia and the U.S. said they recognized that the era in which each had considered the other to be a "strategic threat or enemy" was over. Before leaving April 1, 2008, for Bucharest, Bush told that Russia will not be able to veto Georgia's or Ukraine's inclusion into NATO. Bush said that both countries should be able to take part in NATO's Membership Action Plan, which is designed to help aspiring countries meet the requirements of joining the alliance. Bush added that Ukraine already contributes to NATO missions, specifically in Iraq, Afghanistan and Kosovo. Ukraine also has demonstrated a commitment to democracy. Bush denied that the United States might ease off on membership plans for Ukraine and Georgia if Russia acquiesces on the missile shield.

=== Spain ===
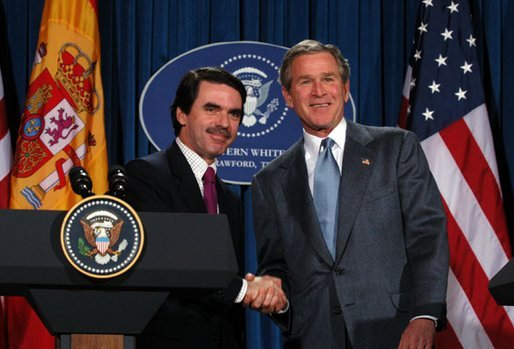
President Bush and Spanish Prime Minister José María Aznar, February 2003

Spanish Prime Minister José María Aznar actively supported Bush in the war on terrorism by first deploying Spanish forces in the U.S.-led coalition War in Afghanistan in 2001. Aznar then met with Bush in a private meeting before 2003 invasion of Iraq to discuss the situation of in the United Nations Security Council. The Spanish newspaper El País leaked a partial transcript of the meeting. Aznar actively encouraged and supported the Bush administration's foreign policy and the U.S. invasion of Iraq in 2003, and was one of the signatories of The letter of the eight defending it on the basis of secret intelligence allegedly containing evidence of the Iraqi government's nuclear proliferation. Aznar then deployed Spanish forces to the Iraq War as part of Multi-National Force – Iraq coalition forces. The majority of the Spanish population, including some members of Aznar's Partido Popular, were against the war.

After the Spanish general election in 2004, in which the Spanish socialists received more votes than expected as a result, besides other issues, of the government's handling of the 2004 Madrid train bombings, José Luis Rodríguez Zapatero succeeded Aznar as Prime Minister. Before being elected, Zapatero had opposed the American policy in regard to Iraq pursued by Aznar. During the electoral campaign Zapatero had promised to withdraw the troops if control in Iraq was not passed to the United Nations after June 30 (the ending date of the initial Spanish military agreement with the multinational coalition that had overthrown Saddam Hussein). On April 19, 2004, Zapatero announced the withdrawal of the 1300 Spanish troops in Iraq.

The decision aroused international support worldwide, though the American Government claimed that the terrorists could perceive it as "a victory obtained due to 11 March 2004 Madrid train bombings". John Kerry, then Democratic party candidate for the American presidency, asked Zapatero not to withdraw the Spanish soldiers. Some months after withdrawing the troops, the Zapatero government agreed to increase the number of Spanish soldiers in Afghanistan and to send troops to Haiti to show the Spanish Government's willingness to spend resources on international missions approved by the UN.

=== United Kingdom ===
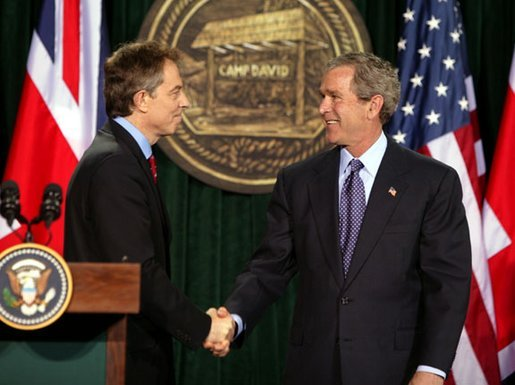
President Bush and British Prime Minister Tony Blair, March 2003

President Bush and British Prime Minister Tony Blair enjoyed a strong relationship. On September 20, 2001, during his address to a joint session of congress, President Bush declared "America has no truer friend than Great Britain". Blair deployed British forces to NATO's war in Afghanistan, second only to the US in sending forces. Blair then took the lead (against the opposition of France, Canada, Germany, China, and Russia) in advocating the invasion of Iraq in 2003 and Blair was also one of the signatories of The letter of the eight on January 30, 2003. Again Britain under Blair was second only to the US in sending forces to Iraq. Both sides wound down after 2009, and withdrew their last troops in 2011. President Bush and Prime Minister Blair provided sustained mutual political and diplomatic support and won votes in Congress and parliament against their critics at home.

== Greater Middle East ==
=== Afghanistan ===
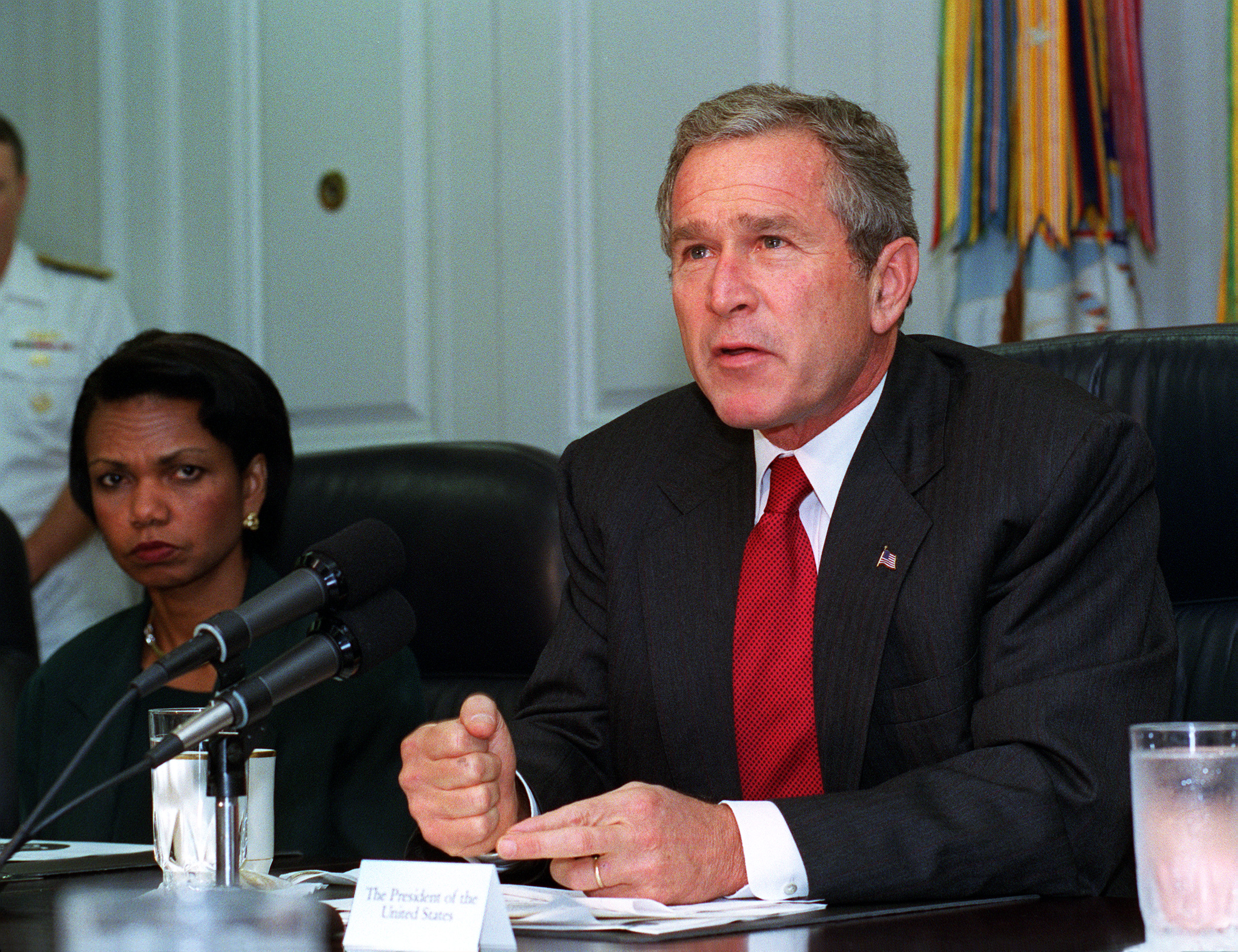
President Bush addressing the media at the Pentagon, September 17, 2001

In his address to a joint session of congress on September 20, 2001, President Bush condemned Osama bin Laden and his organization Al-Qaeda, and issued an ultimatum to the Taliban regime in Afghanistan, where bin Laden was operating, to "hand over the terrorists, or ... share in their fate".

On October 7, 2001, the US led a NATO invasion of Afghanistan, instigating the global war on terror and what became the early phase of the US led-coalition War in Afghanistan. President Bush confirmed the strikes in his address to the nation, Bush stated that "Taliban military sites and terrorist training grounds would be targeted". "Food, medicine and supplies would be dropped to the starving and suffering men, women and children of Afghanistan". NATO forces scoured the region for 9/11 alleged mastermind Osama Bin Laden and his terrorist network Al-Qaeda and drove the fundamentalist Islamic Taliban regime, which was sheltering and providing sanctuary for Bin Laden and Al-Qaeda, from power. However once Bin Laden left Afghanistan and took up sanctuary in Pakistan, Bush said that he was "not that concerned about him" as the Al-Qaeda leader continued to plot attacks against America.

The main goals of the war were to defeat the Taliban, drive al-Qaeda out of Afghanistan, and capture key al-Qaeda leaders. In December 2001, the Pentagon reported that the Taliban had been defeated, but cautioned that the war would go on to continue weakening Taliban and al-Qaeda leaders. Later that month the UN had installed the Afghan Transitional Administration chaired by Hamid Karzai. the U.S. under the Bush administration supported the new government of Karzai by maintaining a high level of troops to establish the authority of his government as well as combat Taliban insurgency. Both Afghanistan and the United States resumed diplomatic ties in late 2001. In 2002, based on UNICEF figures, Nicholas Kristof reported that "our invasion of Afghanistan may end up saving one million lives over the next decade" as the result of improved healthcare and greater access to humanitarian aid.

Efforts to kill or capture al-Qaeda leader Osama bin Laden failed as he escaped a battle in December 2001 in the mountainous region of Tora Bora, which the Bush administration later acknowledged to have resulted from a failure to commit enough U.S. ground troops. It was not until May 2011, two years after Bush left office, that bin Laden was killed by U.S. forces under the Obama administration. Ayman al-Zawahiri, Bin laden's second-in-command, took charge of al-Qaeda until he was killed in a targeted drone strike under the Biden administration.

Despite the initial success in driving the Taliban from power in Kabul, by early 2003 the Taliban was regrouping, amassing new funds and recruits. The 2005 failure of Operation Red Wings showed that the Taliban had returned. In 2006, the Taliban insurgency appeared larger, fiercer and better organized than expected, with large-scale allied offensives such as Operation Mountain Thrust attaining limited success. As a result, in March 2007, the Bush administration deployed another more than 3,500 troops to Afghanistan to expand the fight against the Taliban.

In June 2004, United States Forces began Drone strikes in Pakistan during the administration of President Bush, along the Federal Tribal Areas against Taliban and Al-Qaeda militants.

Major criticisms started to emerge from international human rights organizations about the United States policy of detaining alleged Taliban and Al-Qaeda combatants and refusing to grant these detainees their rights as prisoners of war as detailed in the Geneva Conventions. Other allegations stated that numerous captured Taliban fighters possessed no link to either Al-Qaeda or the Taliban. Instead these fighters had the misfortune of being forcibly recruited into the Taliban military during the American invasion. The practice of impressment was systematic of the Taliban regime which would raid villages for able bodied men to serve on the front lines for a specific time period.

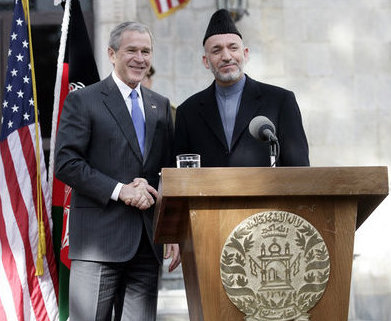
President Bush and Afghan President Hamid Karzai, March 2006

In 2005, the United States and Afghanistan signed a strategic partnership agreement committing both nations to a long-term relationship. On March 1, 2006, Bush along with his wife Laura made a visit to Afghanistan where they greeted US soldiers, met with Afghan officials and later appeared at a special inauguration ceremony at the U.S. Embassy.

The United States under the Bush administration took the leading role in the overall reconstruction of Afghanistan by providing billions of dollars to the Afghan National Security Forces, building national roads, government and educational institutions.

President Bush and his administration labelled the detainees as "unlawful combatants" deemed to pose a threat to the U.S. or to have information about terrorist structures, plans and tactics. The administration has said that such detainees can be held for "as long as necessary". Critics claim that anyone accused of a crime has a right to a fair trial and question whether people like Mullah Abdul Salam Zaeef, the former Taliban ambassador to Pakistan, can be called an "unlawful combatant". In the case of Zaeef, they claim he cannot be a "combatant" because he was crippled during the Soviet occupation and that he wasn't "unlawful" because he was ambassador of his country. The Bush administration and its supporters claim that the war against America by Al-Qaeda is ongoing, that it is unconventional, and that the "battlefield" extends into the U.S. itself. According to the declassified April 2006 National Intelligence Estimate, "United States-led counterterrorism efforts have seriously damaged the leadership of Al-Qaeda and disrupted its operations; however, we judge that al-Qa'ida will continue to pose the greatest threat to the Homeland and US interests abroad by a single terrorist organization. We also assess that the global jihadist movement—which includes Al-Qaeda, affiliated and independent terrorist groups, and emerging networks and cells—is spreading and adapting to counterterrorism efforts."

On September 6, 2006, President Bush confirmed, for the first time, that the CIA had held "high-value detainees" for interrogation in secret prisons around the world. He also announced that fourteen Al-Qaeda senior captives, including Khalid Sheikh Mohammed, were being transferred from CIA custody, to military custody, at Guantanamo Bay detention camp and that these fourteen captives could now expect to face charges before Guantanamo military commissions.

Although the Bush administration released over 100 detainees and authorized military tribunals for the rest, the legal framework governing them has been slow in the making. According to Human Rights Watch, as of January 2004, "the public still [did] not know who the detainees are, what they [had] allegedly done, and whether and when they will be charged with crimes or released. There [had] been no hearings to determine the legal status of detainees and no judicial review—in short, no legal process at all." In February 2002 the United States began releasing several dozen detainees to their home countries, including many British and Pakistani nationals. The British detainees were briefly investigated and cleared of any British charges within 24 hours of their arrival.

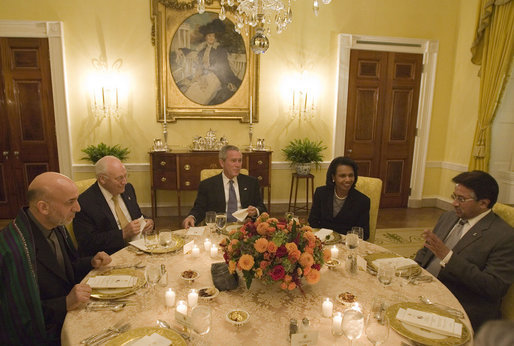
President Bush sits with Vice President Dick Cheney and Secretary of State Condoleezza Rice as they host a working dinner at the White House with President Hamid Karzai (left) of the Islamic Republic of Afghanistan, and President Pervez Musharraf, of the Islamic Republic of Pakistan, September 27, 2006. White House photo by Eric Draper.

The domestic political equation changed in the U.S. after the September 11, 2001, attacks, bolstering the influence of the neoconservative faction of the administration and throughout Washington. The conflict in Afghanistan, and the events that had launched the war, coincided with a reassessment of foreign policy by the administration, which President Bush articulated in his first State of the Union Address on January 29, 2002. Previously, September 11 had underscored the threat of attacks from terrorist groups like Al-Qaeda, as opposed to nation-states, and U.S. military intervention in Afghanistan targeted the ruling Taliban militia for having harbored al-Qaeda sponsor Osama bin Laden. Now speaking of an "axis of evil" comprising Iran, North Korea, and Iraq in his address to Congress, Bush claimed that he was preparing to open a new front in the U.S. global "war on terrorism".

=== Bahrain ===
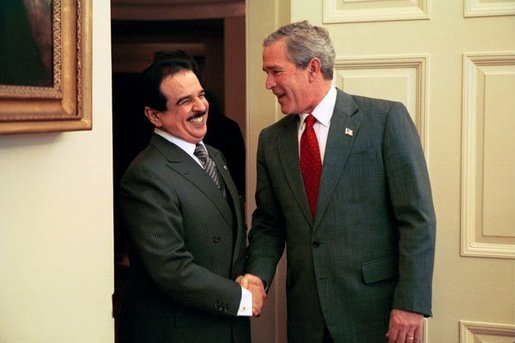
President Bush and King Hamad bin Isa Al Khalifa of Bahrain, November 2004

President Bush designated Bahrain a Major non-NATO ally in 2002. President Bush signed the Bahrain–United States Free Trade Agreement into law on January 11, 2006. The FTA was implemented on August 1, 2006, and will reduce certain barriers of trade between the two countries.

=== Egypt ===
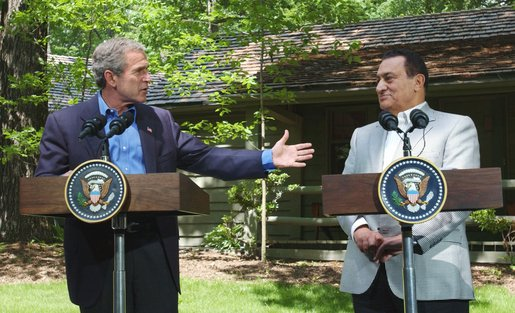
President Bush and Egyptian President Hosni Mubarak, June 2002

President Bush enjoyed relations with Egypt under President Hosni Mubarak, However, later on Egyptian–American relations have become a little tense. This is due to a great extent to the Egyptian unwillingness to send troops to Afghanistan and Iraq in peace stabilization missions. Egypt strongly backed the U.S. in its war against international terrorism after the September 11 attacks of 2001 but refused to send troops to Afghanistan during the war and after it. Egypt also opposed U.S. military intervention of March 2003 in Iraq through their membership in the African Union and the Arab League, continued to oppose U.S. occupation of the country after the war and further refused to comply with U.S. requests to send troops to the country even under a UN umbrella.

President Mubarak spoke out against the 2003 invasion of Iraq, arguing that the Israeli–Palestinian conflict should have been resolved first. He also said the war would cause "100 Bin Ladens". However, as president he did not support an immediate US withdrawal from Iraq because he believed it would probably lead to chaos.

The issue of participation in the post-war construction efforts in Iraq has been controversial in Egypt and in the Arab world as a whole. Opponents say that the war was illegal and it is necessary to wait until Iraq has legal representative government to deal with it. On the other hand, supporters of participation argued that the responsibility to protect Iraqis and to help them in time of crisis should prevail and guide the Egyptian action in Iraq, despite the fact that the Iraqis do not agree.

US officials quoted in USA Today described Egyptian security and military as having shared "valuable intelligence" and providing other "useful counterterrorism assistance", in the 1980, 90s and "particularly in the decade since the 9/11 attacks". Under President Hosni Mubarak and his intelligence chief Omar Suleiman, the U.S. has had "an important partnership" in counterterrorism.

=== Iran ===
In his 2002 State of the Union Address, Bush labeled Iran as a member of the "Axis of Evil", where he stated "Iran aggressively pursues these weapons and exports terror, while an unelected few repress the Iranian people's hope for freedom". Bush also accused Iran of aiding terrorist organizations. In June 2005, Bush issued Executive Order 13382 freezing the assets of individuals connected with Iran's nuclear program. In 2006, Iran re-opened three of its nuclear facilities, potentially allowing it to begin the process of building a nuclear bomb. After the resumption of the Iranian nuclear program, many within the U.S. military and foreign policy community speculated that Bush might attempt to impose regime change on Iran. This was evident in the Iran Freedom and Support Act legislation bill signed by President Bush on September 30, 2006, that appropriated $10 million and directed the President of the United States to spend that money in support of "pro-democracy groups" opposed to the Iranian government. Opponents claimed the bill was a first step towards a US-led invasion of the country. In December 2006, the United Nations Security Council unanimously passed Resolution 1737, which imposed sanctions on Iran in order to curb its nuclear program.

There has been much controversy surrounding Iran and its nuclear program in the past few years. The controversy centers on the Iranian enrichment of uranium. Iran officials have stated that they are enriching the uranium to fuel civilian reactors as permitted under the Nuclear Non-Proliferation Treaty and other international agreements, but the processes that Iran has been developing to reprocess and enrich uranium are also critical components for the development of a nuclear weapon.

Since there exists some circumstantial evidence that Iran, classified by the U.S. as a state sponsor of terrorism, may have intentions of pursuing a weapons program, the Iranian nuclear program became a major foreign policy of the United States.

=== Iraq ===
Beginning with his State of the Union Address on January 29, 2002, President Bush began publicly focusing attention on Iraq, which he labeled as part of an "axis of evil" allied with terrorists and posing "a grave and growing danger" to U.S. interests through possession of weapons of mass destruction. Bush declared, "Iraq continues to flaunt its hostility toward America and to support terror." Announcing that he would possibly take action to topple the Iraqi government, he claimed, "The Iraqi regime has plotted to develop anthrax, and nerve gas, and nuclear weapons for over a decade." and claimed "This is a regime that has already used poison gas to murder thousands of its own citizens, leaving the bodies of mothers huddled over their dead children". and that "This is a regime that agreed to international inspections, then kicked out the inspectors". and that "This is a regime that has something to hide from the civilised world".

In the latter half of 2002, CIA reports contained assertions of Saddam Hussein's intent of reconstituting nuclear weapons programs, not properly accounting for Iraqi biological and chemical weapons, and that some Iraqi missiles had a range greater than allowed by the UN sanctions. Contentions that the Bush administration manipulated or exaggerated the threat and evidence of Iraq's weapons of mass destruction capabilities would eventually become a major point of criticism for the president.

Bush began formally making his case to the international community for an invasion of Iraq on September 12, 2002, in his address to the United Nations General Assembly.

In October 2002, Congress passed a legislation titled the Authorization for Use of Military Force Against Iraq signed by President Bush on October 16, 2002. authorizing the use of the United States Armed Forces against Saddam Hussein's Iraq government.

On November 20, 2002, at a NATO summit in Prague, Czech Republic, President Bush and President of the Czech Republic Vaclav Havel held a joint news conference, where Bush stated "It's very important for our NATO nations as well as all free nations to work collectively to see to it that Saddam Hussein disarms", "However, should he choose not to disarm, the United States will lead a coalition of the willing to disarm him and at that point in time, all our nations will be able choose whether or not they want to participate."

In late 2002 and early 2003, Bush urged the United Nations to enforce Iraqi disarmament mandates, precipitating a diplomatic crisis. In November 2002, Hans Blix and Mohamed ElBaradei led UN weapons inspectors in Iraq, but were advised by the U.S. to depart the country four days prior to the U.S. invasion, despite their requests for more time to complete their tasks. The U.S. initially sought a UN Security Council resolution authorizing the use of military force but dropped the bid for UN approval due to vigorous opposition from several countries. The Bush administration's claim that the Iraq War was part of the war on terror had been questioned and contested by political analysts.

In his State of the Union Address on January 28, 2003, President Bush declared Saddam Hussein was the worst, and "a brutal dictator, with a history of reckless aggression, with ties to terrorism, with great potential wealth, will not be permitted to dominate a vital region and threaten the United States." In this context, Bush also said, "The British government has learned that Saddam Hussein recently sought significant quantities of uranium from Africa".

Although no agreement on authorizing force could be found within the United Nations Security Council, the war was ultimately launched in March 2003, after Bush, in a speech on March 17, 2003, effectively had set out a declaration of his objectives as "assuring [the] national security" of the United States, and "no more poison factories, no more executions of dissidents, no more torture chambers and rape rooms". Bush also issued an ultimatum stating, "Saddam Hussein and his sons must leave Iraq within 48 hours. Their refusal to do so will result in military conflict, commenced at a time of our choosing."

President Bush addresses the world about U.S. intentions regarding Saddam Hussein and Iraq, March 17, 2003

President Bush addresses the nation from the Oval Office, to announce the beginning of Operation Iraqi Freedom, March 19, 2003

President Bush in his address to the nation from the Oval Office on March 19, 2003, officially announced the beginning of the invasion of Iraq, here he stated "On my orders, coalition forces have begun striking selected targets of military importance to undermine Saddam Hussein's ability to wage war. These are opening stages of what will be a broad and concerted campaign. More than 35 countries are giving crucial support from the use of naval and air bases, to help with intelligence and logistics, to the deployment of combat units. Every nation in this coalition has chosen to bear the duty and share the honor of serving in our common defense". The military action was dubbed "Operation Iraqi Freedom".

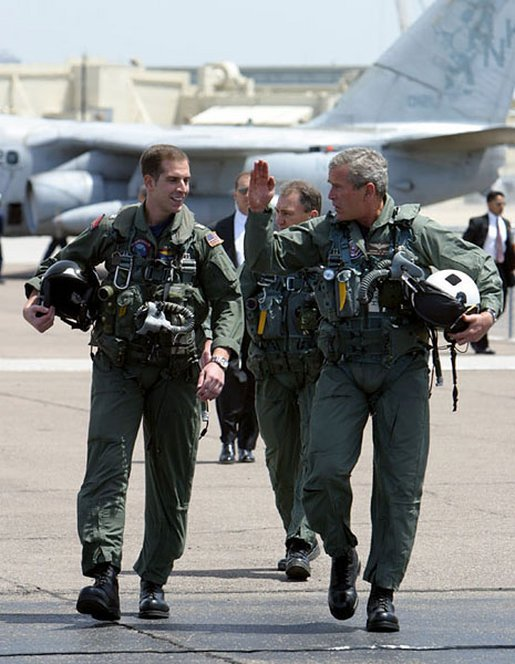
President Bush, with Naval Flight Officer Lieutenant Ryan Philips, after landing on the USS Abraham Lincoln prior to his Mission Accomplished speech, May 1, 2003

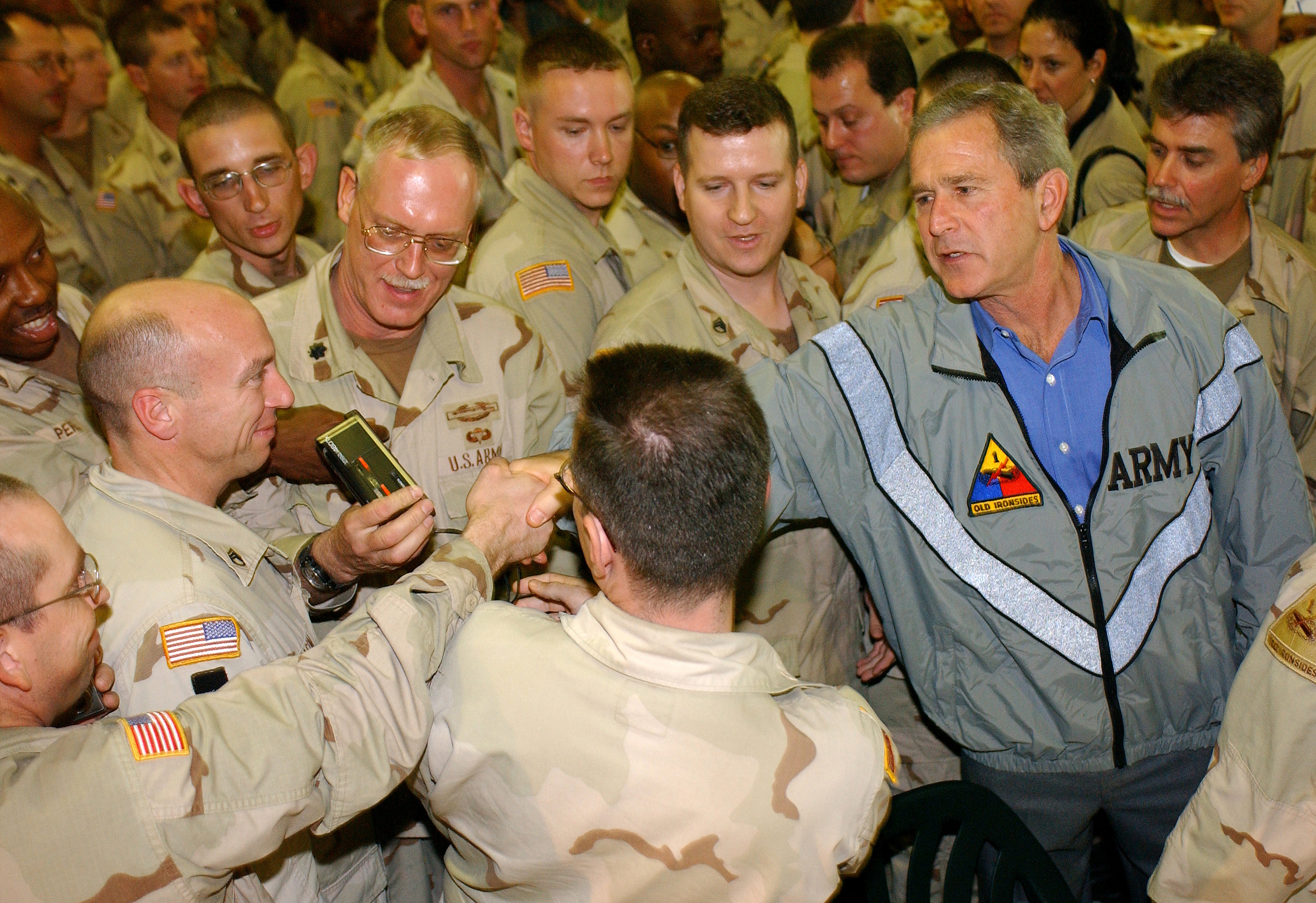
President Bush paying a surprise visit to Baghdad International Airport, November 27, 2003

More than 20 nations (most notably the United Kingdom), designated the "coalition of the willing" joined the United States in invading Iraq. They launched the invasion on March 20, 2003. The Iraqi military was quickly defeated. The capital, Baghdad, fell on April 9, 2003, which resulted in the overthrow of Saddam Hussein's Ba'athist regime 24 year rule. On May 1, Bush declared the end of major combat operations in Iraq. The initial success of U.S. operations increased his popularity, but the U.S. and allied forces faced a growing insurgency led by sectarian groups; Bush's "Mission Accomplished" speech was later criticized as premature. President Bush then appointed Paul Bremer Presidential Envoy to Iraq on May 9, 2003, and administrator of the Coalition Provisional Authority, his appointment declared him subject to the "authority, direction and control" of Secretary of Defense Donald Rumsfeld. On December 14, 2003, President Bush announced the capture of Saddam Hussein, after U.S. forces captured him in Operation Red Dawn and said that Saddam would "face the justice he denied to millions. For the Ba'athist holdouts responsible for the violence, there will be no return to the corrupt power and privilege they once held". From 2004 until 2007, the situation in Iraq deteriorated further, with some observers arguing that there was a full-scale civil war in Iraq. Bush's policies met with criticism, including demands domestically to set a timetable to withdraw troops from Iraq. The 2006 report of the bipartisan Iraq Study Group, led by James Baker, concluded that the situation in Iraq was "grave and deteriorating". While Bush admitted there were strategic mistakes made in regards to the stability of Iraq, he maintained he would not change the overall Iraq strategy. According to Iraq Body Count, some 251,000 Iraqis have been killed in the civil war following the U.S.-led invasion, including at least 163,841 civilians as of 2016.

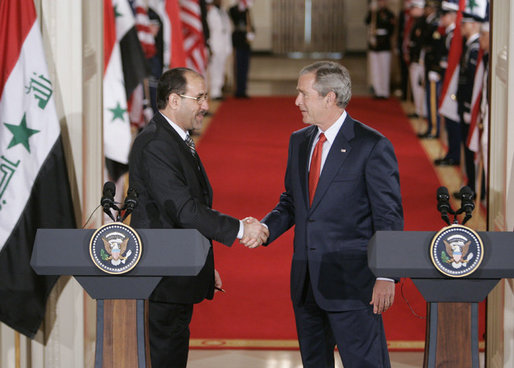
President Bush and Iraqi Prime Minister Nouri al-Maliki, July 2006

In January 2005, free, democratic elections were held in Iraq for the first time in 50 years. According to Iraqi National Security Advisor Mowaffak al-Rubaie, "This is the greatest day in the history of this country." Bush praised the event as well, saying that the Iraqis "have taken rightful control of their country's destiny". This led to the election of Jalal Talabani as president and Nouri al-Maliki as Prime Minister of Iraq. A referendum to approve a constitution in Iraq was held in October 2005, supported by most Shiites and many Kurds.

In June 2006, President Bush announced the death of Abu Musab al-Zarqawi, the leader of Al-Qaeda in Iraq, after U.S. forces killed him in an airstrike and stated that through his every action Zarqawi sought to defeat America and its coalition partners by turning Iraq into a safe haven for al-Qaeda. Bush also stated, "Now Zarqawi has met his end and this violent man will never murder again."

On January 10, 2007, Bush announced a surge of 21,500 more troops for Iraq, as well as a job program for Iraqis, more reconstruction proposals, and $1.2 billion (equivalent to $1.9 billion in 2025) for these programs. On January 23, 2007, in the 2007 State of the Union Address, Bush announced "deploying reinforcements of more than 20,000 additional soldiers and Marines to Iraq". On May 1, 2007, Bush used his second-ever veto to reject a bill setting a deadline for the withdrawal of U.S. troops, saying the debate over the conflict was "understandable" but insisting that a continued U.S. presence there was crucial.

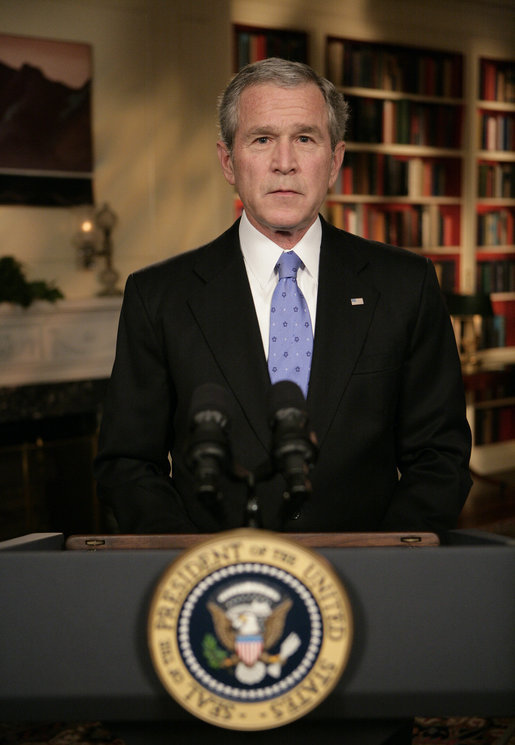
President Bush announces the new strategy on Iraq from the White House Library, January 10, 2007

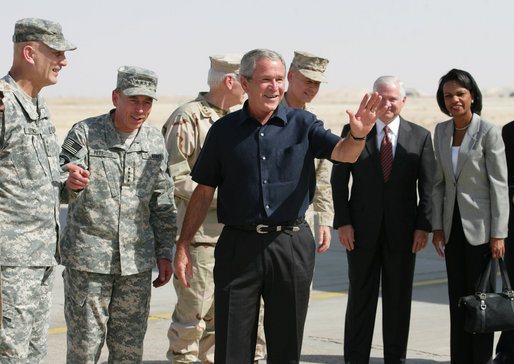
President Bush and a group of high-ranking generals and advisers at Al Asad Airbase in Iraq, September 2007

Bush "shoeing" incident in Baghdad, December 2008

In March 2008, Bush praised the Iraqi government's "bold decision" to launch the Battle of Basra against the Mahdi Army, calling it "a defining moment in the history of a free Iraq". He said he would carefully weigh recommendations from his commanding General David Petraeus and Ambassador Ryan Crocker about how to proceed after the end of the military buildup in the summer of 2008. He also praised the Iraqis' legislative achievements, including a pension law, a revised de-Baathification law, a new budget, an amnesty law, and a provincial powers measure that, he said, set the stage for the Iraqi elections. By July 2008, American troop deaths had reached their lowest number since the war began, and due to increased stability in Iraq, Bush announced the withdrawal of additional American forces. During his last visit in Iraq in December 2008, Iraqi journalist Muntadhar al-Zaidi threw both of his shoes to Bush amid official press conference with Iraqi Prime Minister Nouri al-Maliki. Al-Zaidi yelled the strikes on Bush as "farewell kiss" and "for the widows and orphans and all those killed in Iraq."

In March 2010, Center for Public Integrity released a report that President Bush's administration had made more than 900 false pretenses in a two-year period about alleged threat of Iraq against the United States, as his rationale to engage war in Iraq. Senior war crimes prosecutor Benjamin B. Ferencz has suggested that Bush should be tried in the International Criminal Court for '269 war crime charges' related to the Iraq War.

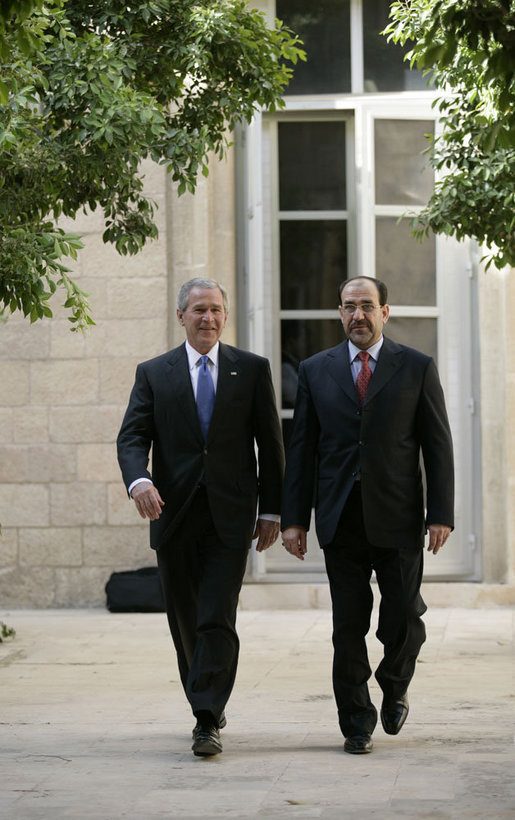
President Bush walks with Iraqi Prime Minister Nouri al-Maliki at the U.S. Embassy in Baghdad, Iraq, June 13, 2006. During his unannounced trip to Iraq, President Bush thanked the Prime Minister, telling him, "I'm convinced you will succeed, and so will the world."

Criticism also came from the governments of many countries, notably from many on the United Nations Security Council, who argued that the war broke international law. (Article VI of the U.S. Constitution states that "all Treaties made, or which shall be made, under the Authority of the United States, shall be the supreme Law of the Land" and that "all executive and judicial Officers, both of the United States and of the several States, shall be bound by Oath or Affirmation, to support this Constitution", while Article III states that the judicial power of the US Supreme Court extends to "all ... Treaties made". This makes a violation of international law also a violation of the "supreme Law of The Land" of America, and withholds immunity from government officials, including the president.) See Worldwide government positions on war on Iraq and The UN Security Council and the Iraq war. For its part, the U.S. administration soon presented a list of countries called the coalition of the willing which supported its position. A later aspect of the criticism has been the death toll in Iraq; over 100,000 Iraqi civilians and 4000 U.S. soldiers have been killed since the beginning of the war mainly during the ensuing insurgency and civil war. In 2004, public assertions by Bush's former Secretary of the Treasury Paul O'Neill and counter-terrorism expert Richard Clarke raised questions about the credibility of the Bush administration's pre-war claims. Both presented evidence that questioned how focused the Bush administration was on combating Al-Qaeda (which was operating out of Afghanistan, not Iraq) before September 11. Specifically, O'Neill presented classified and unclassified documents indicating that planning for a war with Iraq and the subsequent occupation began at the first National Security Council meeting and continued with each meeting. Clarke presented testimony and witnesses concerning how Bush and much of his cabinet tried to find excuses to attack Iraq immediately after September 11, such as associating it with September 11, claiming that Saddam Hussein possessed weapons of mass destruction, and claiming that Iraq posed an imminent threat, which implied that a war against Iraq would be legal by Article 51 of the U.N. Charter.

Testimony at the National Commission on Terrorist Attacks Upon the United States (ongoing during March 2004) has included claims of how much of the Bush administration's immediate post-9/11 emphasis on Iraq was appropriate and proportional to the overall picture of terrorism, especially in light of the administration's subsequent decision to pursue military action in Afghanistan first, the fact that organizations accused of 9/11 are in Afghanistan, not Iraq, and that no links have been found between these organizations and Saddam Hussein. The commission's report is expected to be released before the presidential election. On June 16, 2004, the USA's 9/11 Commission filed an initial report on its findings, stating that it found "no credible evidence" of a "collaborative relationship" between pre-invasion Iraq and Al-Qaeda or of Iraqi involvement in the 9/11 attacks.

The inability of the U.S. to find weapons of mass destruction in Iraq has led to greater domestic criticism of the administration's Iraq policy. Several of the statements that Bush and his administration made leading up to the war in Iraq, especially those involving claims of Iraqi weapons of mass destruction, have been criticized as misleading or inaccurate. Particularly controversial was Bush's claim in the 2003 State of the Union Address that British Intelligence had discovered that Iraq was seeking to buy uranium from Africa. Officials and diplomats disputed the evidence for this claim, especially after a document describing an attempted purchase from Niger, which was presented to the United Nations Security Council by Colin Powell, was found to be a forgery. This led to a public embarrassment for George Tenet, the director of the CIA, as well as the Valerie Plame scandal. Much criticism on these issues has come from political opponents of Bush. The Iraq war was a significant issue in the 2004 Democratic primary, including the campaigns of Howard Dean, John Kerry, Al Sharpton, and Dennis Kucinich.

However, State Department documents declassified in 2006 cite hundreds of weapons of mass destruction found in Iraq. Nonetheless, it was soon quickly revealed that the particular weapons in question were WMD Saddam had obtained during the Iran-Iraq war, which had long since become stale and non-functional

On March 24, 2004, Bush joked about the weapons of mass destruction issue at the annual White House Correspondents' Dinner. While showing slides of himself searching the Oval Office, he joked, "those weapons of mass destruction have got to be somewhere ... nope, no weapons over there ... maybe under here?" Some found it tasteless of him to be joking about the issue. Others defended the joke as being in line with the self-deprecatory sort of humor that has come to be expected of presidents when they speak at that event.

On September 26, 2006, Bush declassified the key judgments of the April 2006 National Intelligence Estimate. The estimate, titled Trends in Global Terrorism: Implications for the United States, states the following: "We assess that the Iraq jihad is shaping a new generation of terrorist leaders and operatives; perceived jihadist success there would inspire more fighters to continue the struggle elsewhere. The Iraq conflict has become the 'cause celebre' for jihadists, breeding a deep resentment of US involvement in the Muslim world and cultivating supporters for the global jihadist movement. Should jihadists leaving Iraq perceive themselves, and be perceived, to have failed, we judge fewer fighters will be inspired to carry on the fight."

On December 1, 2008, during an interview with ABC World News, Bush stated "The biggest regret of all the presidency has to have been the intelligence failure in Iraq. A lot of people put their reputations on the line and said the weapons of mass destruction is a reason to remove Saddam Hussein". "I think I was unprepared for war. In other words, I didn't campaign and say, 'Please vote for me, I'll be able to handle an attack' ... I didn't anticipate war." and on early withdrawal of troops, "It was a tough call, particularly, since a lot of people were advising for me to get out of Iraq, or pull back in Iraq".

On December 14, 2008, during a joint press conference with Iraqi Prime Minister Nouri al-Maliki, Bush was publicly insulted when an Iraqi reporter threw his shoes at the President as Bush and al-Maliki were about to shake hands. The offender, later identified as television correspondent Muntadar al-Zeidi, leapt from his chair and quickly hurled first one shoe and then the other at the president, who was about 20 feet away. Bush successfully dodged both projectiles which were aimed at his head. Zeidi worked for Al-Baghdadia television, an Iraqi-owned station based in Cairo. He was wrestled to the ground by security officials and then hauled away, moaning as they left the room. "So what if the guy threw a shoe at me?" Bush said, comparing the action to political protests in the United States. Al-Baghdadia's Baghdad manager told the Associated Press he had no idea what prompted his reporter to go on the attack. The Iraqi government has demanded an on-air apology from his employer.

=== Israel ===
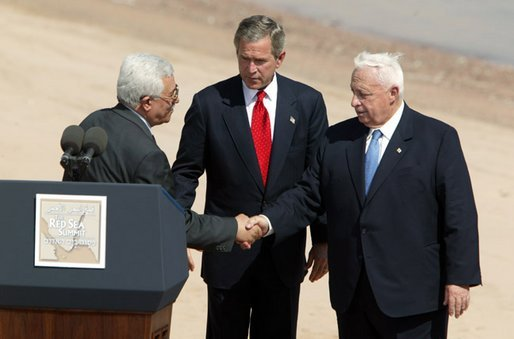
Mahmoud Abbas, President Bush, and Israeli Prime Minister Ariel Sharon after reading statement to the press during the closing moments of the Red Sea Summit in Aqaba, Jordan, June 4, 2003

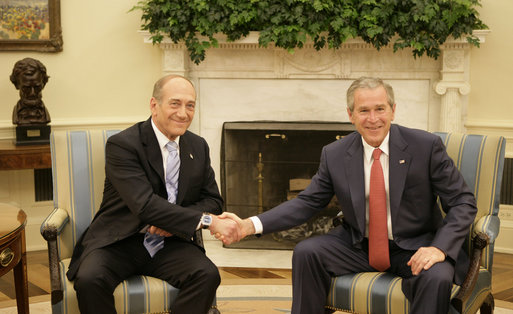
President Bush and Israeli Prime Minister Ehud Olmert, May 2006

President Bush and Israeli Prime Minister Ariel Sharon established good relations in their March and June 2001 meetings. On October 4, 2001, shortly after the September 11 attacks, Sharon accused the Bush administration of appeasing the Palestinians at Israel's expense in a bid for Arab support for the US anti-terror campaign. The White House said that the remark was unacceptable. Rather than apologize for the remark, Sharon said that the United States failed to understand him. Also, the United States criticized the Israeli practice of assassinating Palestinians believed to be engaged in terrorism, which appeared to some Israelis to be inconsistent with the US policy of pursuing Osama bin Laden "dead or alive".

In 2003, in the middle of the Second Intifada and a sharp economic downturn in Israel, the US provided Israel with $9 billion in conditional loan guarantees made available through 2011 and negotiated each year at the US–Israel Joint Economic Development Group.

President Bush noted in an April 14, 2002, Memorandum which came to be called "the Bush Roadmap" (and which established the parameters for subsequent Israel-Palestinian negotiations) the need to take into account changed "realities on the ground, including already existing major Israeli population centers", as well as Israel's security concerns, asserting that "It is unrealistic to expect that the outcome of final status negotiations will be full and complete return to the armistice lines of 1949." He later emphasized that, within these parameters, details of the borders were subjects for negotiations between the parties.

Bush had maintained a desire to resume the peace process in Israel, and had openly proclaimed his desire for a Palestinian state to be created before 2005. He outlined a road map for peace in cooperation with Russia, the European Union, and the United Nations, which featured compromises that had to be made by both sides before Palestinian statehood could become a reality.

One particular proposal was his insistence on new Palestinian leadership; a stance that saw the appointment of the first ever Palestinian Prime Minister on April 29, 2003. Bush had denounced Palestine Liberation Organization leader Yasser Arafat for continued support of violence and militant groups. The road map for peace stalled within months after more violence and the resignation of the new Palestinian Prime Minister, Mahmoud Abbas.

By the end of 2003, neither side had done what was outlined in the plan. In April 2004 Bush announced that he endorsed Israeli Prime Minister Ariel Sharon's plan to disengage from the Gaza Strip but retain Jewish settlements in the West Bank. He also announced agreement with Sharon's policy of denying the right of return. This led to condemnation from Palestinian President Yasser Arafat, Arab and European governments and was a major departure from previous U.S. foreign policy in the region. Egyptian President Hosni Mubarak commented Bush's policies had led to an 'unprecedented hatred' of Arabs for the U.S.

During the 2006 Lebanon War, On July 14, 2006, the US Congress was notified of a potential sale of $210 million worth of jet fuel to Israel. The Defense Security Cooperation Agency noted that the sale of the JP-8 fuel, should it be completed, will "enable Israel to maintain the operational capability of its aircraft inventory", and that "The jet fuel will be consumed while the aircraft is in use to keep peace and security in the region". It was reported on July 24 that the United States was in the process of providing Israel with "bunker buster" bombs, which would allegedly be used to target the leader of Lebanon's Hezbollah guerilla group and destroy its trenches.

American media also questioned whether Israel violated an agreement not to use cluster bombs on civilian targets. Although many of the cluster bombs used were advanced M-85 munitions developed by Israel Military Industries, Israel also used older munitions purchased from the US. Evidence during the conflict, hitting civilian areas, although the civilian population had mostly fled. Israel asserts that civilian damage was unavoidable, as Hezbollah ensconced itself in highly populated areas. Simultaneously, indiscriminate Hezbollah rocket fire turned many of its northern towns into virtual ghost towns, in violation of international law. Many bomblets remained undetonated after the war, causing hazard for Lebanese civilians. Israel said that it had not violated any international law because cluster bombs are not illegal and were used only on military targets.

On July 15, 2006, the United Nations Security Council again rejected pleas from Lebanon that it call for an immediate ceasefire between Israel and Lebanon. The Israeli newspaper Haaretz reported that the US was the only member of out the 15-nation UN body to oppose any council action at all.

On July 19, 2006, the Bush administration rejected calls for an immediate ceasefire. Secretary of State Condoleezza Rice said that certain conditions had to be met, not specifying what they were. John Bolton, US Ambassador to the United Nations, rejected the call for a ceasefire, on the grounds that such an action addressed the conflict only superficially: "The notion that you just declare a ceasefire and act as if that is going to solve the problem, I think is simplistic."

On July 26, 2006, foreign ministers from the US, Europe, and the Middle East that met in Rome vowed "to work immediately to reach with the utmost urgency a ceasefire that puts an end to the current violence and hostilities". However, the US maintained strong support for the Israeli campaign, and the conference's results were reported to have fallen short of Arab and European leaders' expectations.

After the 2006 Lebanon war ended, President Bush said that Hezbollah was responsible for starting the war, and that the group suffered a defeat at the hands of Israel. He dismissed claims of victory by Hezbollah leaders, asking: "how can you claim victory when at one time you were a state within a state, safe within southern Lebanon, and now you're going to be replaced by a Lebanese Army and an international force?" In his 2010 memoir, Decision Points, Bush wrote that Israel had weakened Hezbollah and secured its northern border, but that Israel's "shaky military performance" cost it international credibility. He also said that Israel "mishandled its opportunity", and that some of the sites it attacked were of "questionable military value".

In September 2008, The Guardian reported that the U.S. vetoed Israeli Prime Minister Ehud Olmert's plan to bomb Iranian nuclear facilities the previous May.

=== Jordan ===
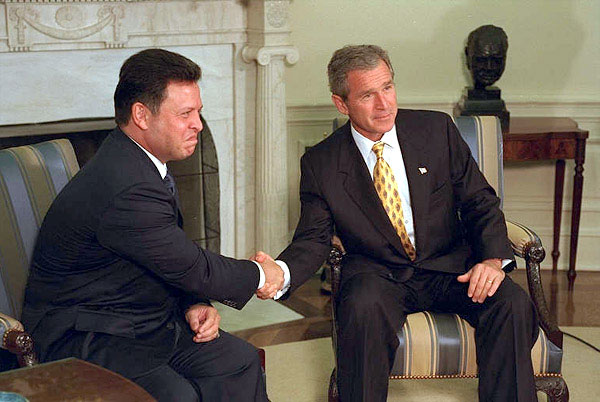
President Bush and King Abdullah II of Jordan, September 2001

On September 28, 2001, President Bush signed the Jordan–United States Free Trade Agreement and it was the first free trade agreement (FTA) the United States signed with an Arab country (and the fourth FTA overall behind Israel, Canada, and Mexico). However, King Abdullah advised Washington against the 2003 Iraq War, but later allegedly gave the invading coalition some degree of covert and tacit support, despite the overwhelming opinion of his own public. The Jordanian government publicly opposed the war against Iraq. The King stressed to the United States and European Union that a diplomatic solution, in accordance with UN Security Council (UNSC) resolutions 1284 (1999) and 1409 (2002), was the only appropriate model for resolving the conflict between Iraq and the UN. In August 2002 he told the Washington Post that an attempt to invade Iraq would be a "tremendous mistake" and that it could "throw the whole area into turmoil".

=== Kuwait ===
Kuwait was the only major regional ally that supported the U.S.-led 2003 Invasion of Iraq, because Kuwait had hostility towards Saddam's Iraq stemmed from the events surrounding the first Persian Gulf War. The public appeared to consider Saddam to be as much of a threat in 2003 as he was in the past, and were particularly interested in attempts to repatriate many Kuwaiti citizens who had disappeared during the Gulf War, and were presumably languishing in Iraqi jails up until Saddam's fall from power. Kuwait also allowed the U.S. to launch the 2003 invasion of Iraq from the U.S. military bases stationed in Kuwait. However, Kuwait did not deploy forces to the Iraq War. In 2004, President Bush designated Kuwait as a Major non-NATO ally

=== Lebanon ===
President Bush stated Lebanon "can serve as a great example (to other countries) of what is possible" in the Middle East".

In April 2006, following a meeting at the White House with Lebanese Prime Minister Fuad Siniora, Mr. Bush said that the United States "strongly supports a free and independent and sovereign Lebanon". He recalled the 2005 Cedar Revolution, in which hundreds of thousands of Lebanese protested against and forced the withdrawal of Syrian troops from their country.

Prime Minister Siniora stated "We took great joy in seeing the Cedar Revolution. We understand that the hundreds of thousands of people who took to the street to express their desire to be free required courage, and we support the desire of the people to have a government responsive to their needs and a government that is free, truly free."

President Bush recalled Lebanon's "great tradition" of serving "as a model of entrepreneurship and prosperity". He also called for a full investigation into the February 2005 assassination of former Lebanese Prime Minister Rafic Hariri, which helped spur the Cedar Revolution.

Prime Minister Siniora said the United States "has been of great support" to Lebanon, which has gone through "major changes" in the past year-and-a-half" and that "Lebanon has really been committing itself that we want the change to happen to in a democratic and a peaceful manner, but at the same time, to really stay course on course; that we are there to meet the expectations of the people to have a united, liberal, free country, and, at the same time, prosperous economy. ... The United States has been of great support to Lebanon. I am really convinced that President Bush and the United States will stand beside Lebanon to have Lebanon stay as a free, democratic, united, and sovereign state."

"Out of the tough times [Lebanon] has been through", said President Bush, "will rise a state that shows that it's possible for people of religious difference to live side-by-side in peace; to show that it's possible for people to put aside past histories to live together in. ... peace and hope and opportunity."

=== Libya ===
After its public announcement on December 19, 2003, Libya announced its intention to rid itself of WMD and MTCR-class missile programs. the Gaddafi government cooperated with the U.S., the U.K., the International Atomic Energy Agency, and the Organization for the Prohibition of Chemical Weapons toward these objectives. Libya also signed the IAEA Additional Protocol and has become a State Party to the Chemical Weapons Convention.

In recognition of these actions, the U.S. under the Bush administration began the process of normalizing relations with Libya. The U.S. terminated the applicability of the Iran and Libya Sanctions Act to Libya and President Bush signed an Executive Order on September 20, 2004, terminating the national emergency with respect to Libya and ending IEEPA-based economic sanctions. This action had the effect of unblocking assets blocked under the Executive Order sanctions. Restrictions on cargo aviation and third-party code-sharing have been lifted, as have restrictions on passenger aviation. Certain export controls remain in place.

U.S. diplomatic personnel reopened the U.S. Interest Section in Tripoli on February 8, 2004. In the same month, the U.S. State Department lifted the 23-year travel ban on Libya. The U.S. Interest Section was upgraded to a U.S. Liaison Office on June 28, 2004, and to a full embassy on May 31, 2006. The establishment in 2005 of an American School in Tripoli demonstrates the increased presence of Americans in Libya, and the continuing normalization of bilateral relations. Libya re-established its diplomatic presence in Washington with the opening of an Interest Section on July 8, 2004, which was subsequently upgraded to a Liaison Office in December 2004 and to a full embassy on May 31, 2006.

On May 15, 2006, the US State Department announced its intention to rescind Libya's designation as a state sponsor of terrorism in recognition of the fact that Libya had met the statutory requirements for such a move: it had not provided any support for acts of international terrorism in the preceding six-month period, and had provided assurances that it would not do so in the future. On June 30, 2006, the U.S. rescinded Libya's designation as a state sponsor of terrorism. In July 2007, Mr. Gene Cretz was nominated by President Bush as ambassador to Libya. The Foreign Relations Committee of the U.S. Senate held Cretz's confirmation hearing on Wednesday, September 25, 2008. The Libyan government satisfied its responsibility and paid the remaining amount of money it owed (total of $1.5 billion) to the victims of several acts of terrorism on Friday, October 31, 2008. That same year, the United States and Libya also signed a bilateral Agreement on Science and Technology Cooperation.

=== Morocco ===
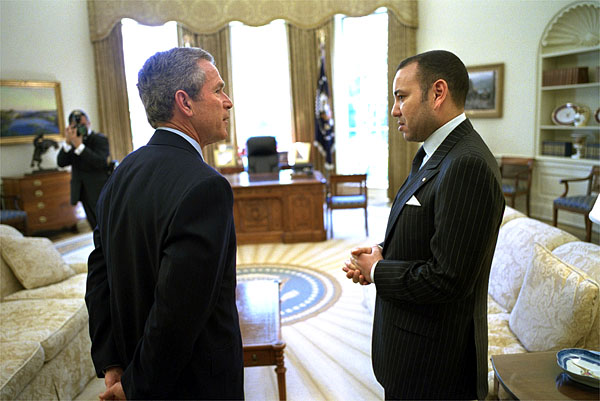
President Bush and King Mohammed VI of Morocco, April 2002

In the 21st century, both countries have become close allies in the global "war on terror". Morocco was among the first Arab and Islamic states to denounce the September 11, 2001, terrorist attacks in the United States and declare solidarity with the American people in fighting terrorism. After the September 11 attacks, Morocco has been instrumental in supporting the United States. For example, King Mohammed VI presided over a mass service in support of the victims of the September 11 attacks. Additionally, security cooperation between the two countries is well developed. King Mohammed VI collaborates with U.S. intelligence and security officials in providing intelligence and preventing terrorist attacks in the Straits of Gibraltar. In January 2004, during the Bush administration, Morocco was designated a major non-NATO ally as a reward for its collaboration. Morocco remains one of America's oldest and closest allies, a status affirmed by Morocco's zero-tolerance policy towards Al-Qaeda and their affiliated groups. Morocco also assisted the U.S. Central Intelligence Agency with questioning al-Qaeda members captured in Afghanistan, Iraq, and elsewhere

Morocco also plays a pivotal role in the Trans-Saharan Counterterrorism Initiative to contain Salafist groups in the Saharan and in the Sahel regions of West Africa. Likewise, when Casablanca was the victim of terrorist bombings on May 16, 2003, the U.S. government offered Morocco the full resources of its military and intelligence community. Furthermore, the CIA has utilized Morocco as a source for recruiting Arabic-speaking spies.

The United States and Morocco signed a Free Trade Agreement (FTA) on June 15, 2004, which went into effect on January 1, 2006. The Kingdom of Morocco submitted an official statement on the matter for a U.S. House of Representatives congressional hearing in June 2007. It read, in part, "Morocco is pleased to see that the United States has over the last several years very substantially increased its engagement in the Maghreb. Morocco is a longtime partner of the United States and our experience with your great nation over the last two centuries has persuaded us that there is much that we can accomplish together. The FTA between Morocco and USA is a great opportunity for US companies to increase their market shares". The FTA also stipulates broad labor protections for both countries, with a dual focus on transparency, and maintaining said protections while promoting economic growth. The explicitly defined protections laid out in the Labor section of the agreement are essentially the general rights promoted by the International Labor Organization in their 1998 declaration; however, the Labor section also provides a framework by which the countries may cooperate to extend labor rights further. The developments listed as potentially pursuable include the establishment of "social safety net programs", regulation of "working conditions", and "timely" creation of "labor market statistics". In 2008, U.S. direct investment in Morocco was about 7%, and U.S. aid to Morocco was about 4%. In 2017, US direct investment in Morocco had risen to 21.4%.

=== Oman ===
On November 15, 2004, the Bush administration notified the U.S. Congress of its intent to sign a trade agreement with the Middle Eastern Sultanate of Oman. On January 19, 2006, the two countries signed the U.S.-Oman Free Trade Agreement (OFTA), which was part of the Bush administration's strategy to create a US - Middle East Free Trade Area (MEFTA) by 2013.

On June 29, 2006, the U.S. Senate passed OFTA by a vote of 60–34, the fewest "aye" votes in the Senate of any trade bill other than CAFTA. On July 20, 2006, the U.S. House of Representatives passed OFTA by a vote of 221–205, with 7 abstentions. For procedural reasons, the Senate took a second vote on September 19, 2006, and the bill's implementing bill was passed 62–32, with 6 abstentions. In all, the Senate approved the bill 63–37, since all senators voted either "aye" or "nay" in one of the two votes.

President Bush signed the bill into law on September 26, 2006. And on December 29, 2008, signed the proclamation to implement the agreement with effective date of January 1, 2009.

=== Qatar ===
President Bush visited Qatar in June 2003, where he met with Emir Hamad bin Khalifa Al Thani. then Visited U.S. Central Command headquarters and addressed U.S. military personnel, becoming the first U.S. president to visit the country.

=== Saudi Arabia ===
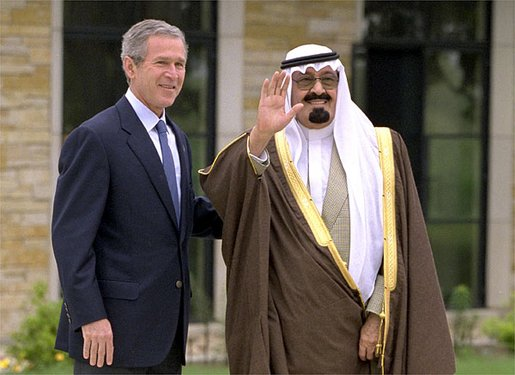
President Bush and Saudi Crown Prince Abdullah, April 2002. Saudi Arabia is a key U.S. ally in the Middle East.

President Bush had close and strong relations with senior members of the Saudi royal family. Saudi Arabia engaged the Washington, D.C., lobbying firm of Patton Boggs as registered foreign agents in the wake of the public relations disaster when knowledge of the identities of suspected hijackers became known. They also hired the PR and lobbying firm Qorvis for $14 million a year. Qorvis engaged in a PR frenzy that publicized the "9/11 Commission finding that there was 'no evidence that the Saudi government as an institution or senior Saudi officials individually funded [Al Qaeda]'—while omitting the report's conclusion that 'Saudi Arabia has been a problematic ally in combating Islamic extremism.'"

According to at least one journalist (John R. Bradley), the ruling Saudi family was caught between depending for military defense on the United States, while also depending for domestic support on the Wahhabi religious establishment, which as a matter of religious doctrine "ultimately seeks the West's destruction", including that of its ruler's purported ally—the US. During the Iraq War, Saudi Foreign Minister Prince Saud Al-Faisal, criticized the U.S.-led invasion as a "colonial adventure" aimed only at gaining control of Iraq's natural resources. But at the same time, Bradley writes, the Saudi government secretly allowed the US military to "essentially" manage its air campaign and launch special operations against Iraq from inside Saudi borders, using "at least three" Saudi air bases.

The two nations cooperated and shared information about al-Qaeda (Alsheikh 2006) and leaders from both countries continue to meet to discuss their mutual interests and bilateral relations.

Saudi Arabia and the U.S. are strategic allies,

=== Syria ===
Bush expanded economic sanctions on Syria. In 2003, Bush signed the Syria Accountability Act, which expanded sanctions on Syria. In May 2004, a new comprehensive set of economic sanctions were enacted under the Bush administration by Executive Order 13338. Overall, There were a total of seven of executive orders enacted by President Bush to implement sanctions on Syria, which include Executive Orders 13315, 13224, 13382, 13338, 13399, 13441, and 13460. These sanctions are imposed on certain Syrian citizens or entities due to their participation in terrorism, acts of public corruption, or their destabilizing activities in Iraq and Lebanon.

In early 2007, the Treasury Department, acting on a June 2005 executive order, froze American bank accounts of Syria's Higher Institute of Applied Science and Technology, Electronics Institute, and National Standards and Calibration Laboratory. Bush's order prohibits Americans from doing business with these institutions suspected of helping spread weapons of mass destruction and being supportive of terrorism. Under separate executive orders signed by Bush in 2004 and later 2007, the Treasury Department froze the assets of two Lebanese and two Syrians, accusing them of activities to "undermine the legitimate political process in Lebanon" in November 2007. Those designated included: Assaad Halim Hardan, a member of Lebanon's parliament and current leader of the Syrian Socialist National Party; Wi'am Wahhab, a former member of Lebanon's government (Minister of the Environment) under Prime Minister Omar Karami (2004–2005); Hafiz Makhluf, a colonel and senior official in the Syrian General Intelligence Directorate and a cousin of Syrian President Bashar al-Assad; and Muhammad Nasif Khayrbik, identified as a close adviser to Assad.

=== United Arab Emirates ===
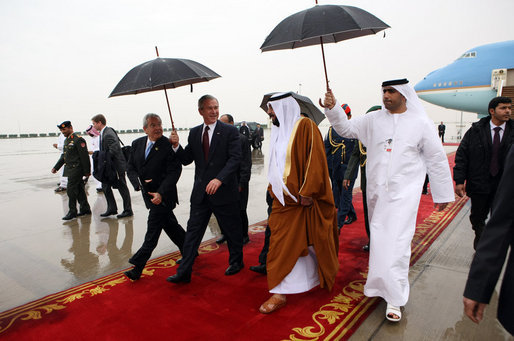
President Bush and UAE President Khalifa bin Zayed Al Nahyan at Abu Dhabi International Airport, January 2008

According to Richard A. Clarke, then US National Coordinator for Security, Infrastructure Protection and Counter-terrorism and a contributor in the 9/11 Commission Report, the UAE is the United States best counter-terrorism ally in the Gulf. According to previous US ambassador to UAE Richard G. Olson, Deputy Commander of the UAE Armed Forces Mohammed bin Zayed Al Nahyan structured the UAE Armed forces to be closely aligned with the US military.

The United Arab Emirates Armed Forces is the only Arab country to commit military troops for humanitarian aid missions in the US-led War in Afghanistan when it deployed its forces of 170 soldiers serving in Tarin Kowt province in March 2008.

== Oceania ==
=== Australia ===
President Bush and Australian Prime Minister John Howard on September 10, 2001. Howard was in Washington during the September 11 attacks.

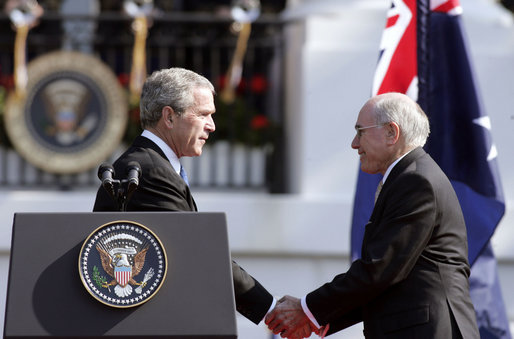
President Bush and Australian Prime Minister John Howard, May 2006

President Bush and Australian Prime Minister John Howard maintained a strong friendship. Following the September 11 attacks, in which eleven Australian citizens were also killed, there was an enormous outpouring of sympathy from Australia for the United States. Prime Minister Howard became one of Bush's strongest international supporters, and supported the United States in the invasion of Afghanistan in 2001 by invoking the ANZUS treaty and the invasion of Iraq in 2003, by deploying Australian forces in both wars.

In 2004 the Bush administration "fast tracked" a free trade agreement with Australia. The Sydney Morning Herald called the deal a "reward" for Australia's contribution of troops to the Iraq invasion.

=== New Zealand ===
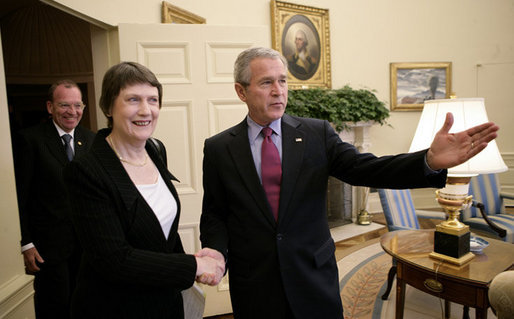
President Bush and New Zealander Prime Minister Helen Clark, March 2007

Relations with New Zealand under the Bush administration improved and became increasingly closer especially after Prime Minister Helen Clark visited the White House on March 22, 2007. Following the 9/11 attacks, Prime Minister Clark contributed New Zealand military forces to the War in Afghanistan.

== Sub-Saharan Africa ==
Time stated that Africa is the "triumph of American foreign policy" and is the "Bush Administration's greatest achievement".

=== Humanitarian aid ===
President Bush worked to reduce the HIV/AIDS epidemics in Africa, stop the spread of malaria, and rebuild broken nations from their genocidal pasts. One of the most notable programs initiated by Bush is the PEPFAR (President's Emergency Plan for AIDS Relief) Program, which was a commitment of $15 billion over five years (2003–2008) from the United States to fight the global HIV/AIDS pandemic. As of September 2007, the program estimated that it had supported the provision of antiretroviral treatment to approximately 1,445,500 people, mostly in Africa. Alternate Delegate to the United Nations Kelly Craft advised the US Ambassador to the UN on US engagement in Africa. Craft also gave a speech to the UN General Assembly on the investment the U.S. and other nations were making to fight HIV/AIDS in Africa and malaria in Africa, and promote development there.

Bush also initiated programs that put more than 29 million of Africa's poorest children into schools. Bush provided "huge overt support" in Liberia to stabilize the country, and increasingly effective aid and trade backing good governance have helped improve health and provide education, skills, and jobs on the continent. He also supported agricultural independence in Africa, reducing Chinese mercantilism on the continent that had been overwhelming the farmers. Beninese cotton farmers urged him to "stand fast on his opposition to the pork-belly politics of the farm bill that is winding its disgraceful way through Congress" on his last visit to Africa. Finally, he was steadfast in changing the Doha round of World Trade Organization talks so it will favor the poor in Africa.

=== Sudan/Darfur conflict ===
On October 13, 2006, President Bush signed the Darfur Peace and Accountability Act imposing sanctions against people responsible for genocide and war crimes in Sudan. It enables the Bush administration to deny Sudan's government access to oil revenues. Furthermore, to the signing of the law, Bush signed another executive order that confirms the existing sanctions but eases some on parts of southern Sudan. It also includes exceptions to facilitate the flow of humanitarian aid to Darfur. On the other side the order toughens some sanctions, including a provision that bars any American from engaging in oil-related transactions in Sudan. The order comes as the Bush administration's new special envoy for Sudan, Andrew Natsios, began a trip to Sudan, where he plans to meet with government officials and visit war-torn Darfur.

In response to the Government of Sudan's continued complicity in unabated violence occurring in Darfur, Bush imposed new economic sanctions on Sudan in May 2007. These sanctions blocked assets of Sudanese citizens implicated in the Darfur violence, and also sanctioned additional companies owned or controlled by the Government of Sudan. Sanctions continue to underscore U.S. efforts to end the suffering of the millions of Sudanese affected by the crisis in Darfur. Sudan has often accused the U.S. of threatening its territorial integrity by supporting referendums in the South and in Darfur.

=== Zimbabwe ===
In March 2003, President Bush issued an executive order, where he imposed targeted sanctions on the Government of Zimbabwe, including financial and visa measures, sanctions against selected individuals including Zimbabwean President Robert Mugabe and 76 other high-ranking government officials, a ban on transfers of defence items and services, and a suspension of non-humanitarian government-to-government assistance. "Over the course of more than two years, the government of Zimbabwe has systematically undermined that nation's democratic institutions, employing violence, intimidation, and repressive means including legislation to stifle opposition to its rule", Bush said in the order. Bush also said the situation in Zimbabwe "endangers the southern African region" and threatens to undermine democratic reforms throughout the continent. Despite strained political relations, the United States continued as a leading provider of humanitarian assistance to the people of Zimbabwe, providing about $400,000,000 in humanitarian assistance from 2002 to 2007, most of it being food aid. In January 2005, Secretary of State Condoleezza Rice of the Bush administration identified Zimbabwe as one of the states in outposts of tyranny due to the Zimbabwean Government of Robert Mugabe's increased assault on human rights and the rule of law.

In July 2008, President Bush signed another executive order to widen the sanctions against individuals and organizations in Zimbabwe associated with what he calls the "illegitimate" regime of President Robert Mugabe after the controversial 2008 Zimbabwean general election.

== See also ==
- List of international presidential trips made by George W. Bush
- List of international trips made by Colin Powell as United States Secretary of State
- List of international trips made by Condoleezza Rice as United States Secretary of State
- Condoleezza Rice as Secretary of State
  - Duty: Memoirs of a Secretary at War by Robert M. Gates
- Foreign policy of Tony Blair
- Views on the 2003 invasion of Iraq
- International relations since 1989
