= List of international presidential trips made by George W. Bush =

This is a list of international presidential trips made by George W. Bush, the 43rd president of the United States. George W. Bush made 49 international trips to 73 countries (in addition to visiting the West Bank) during his presidency, which began on January 20, 2001 and ended on January 20, 2009.

Bush visited six continents: Africa, Asia, Australia, Europe, North America, and South America. On one of his two trips to Sub-Saharan Africa, he visited three of the poorest countries in the world at the time: Liberia, Rwanda, and Benin. He also made a secret trip to Iraq on Thanksgiving Day 2003 to dine with the troops. His father had made a similar visit to the U.S. troops in Saudi Arabia in 1990. On November 15–20, 2006, Bush made the third round the world presidential flight (after Johnson and Nixon).

== Summary ==
The number of visits per country where President Bush travelled are:

- One visit to Albania, Argentina, Austria, Bahrain, Benin, Botswana, Bulgaria, Chile, Croatia, Denmark, El Salvador, Estonia, Georgia, Ghana, Guatemala, Hungary, India, Kosovo, Kuwait, Liberia, Lithuania, Mongolia, Netherlands, Nigeria, Pakistan, Panama, Philippines, Portugal, Qatar, Rwanda, Senegal, Slovakia, South Africa, Spain, Sweden, Tanzania, Turkey, Uganda, Ukraine, United Arab Emirates, Uruguay, Vietnam, and the West Bank
- Two visits to Afghanistan, Australia, Belgium, Brazil, Colombia, Czech Republic, Indonesia, Ireland, Israel, Jordan, Latvia, Peru, Romania, Saudi Arabia, Singapore, Slovenia, and Thailand
- Three visits to Egypt, South Korea, and Poland
- Four visits to Canada, China, France, Iraq, and Japan
- Five visits to Germany, the United Kingdom and Vatican City
- Six visits to Italy and Mexico
- Seven visits to Russia

Map of international trips made by George W. Bush as president: United States 7 visits 6 visits 5 visits 4 visits 3 visits 2 visits 1 visit

== First term (2001–2005) ==
=== 2001 ===
	Country	Areas visited	Dates	Details	Image
1	Mexico	San Cristóbal	February 16	Met with President Vicente Fox; discussed trade, energy, migration, educational opportunities, and the battle against the illegal drug trade.	
2	Canada	Quebec City	April 20–22	Attended the 3rd Summit of the Americas.	
3	Spain	Madrid	June 12–13	Met with King Juan Carlos I at the Royal Palace of Madrid and later with Prime Minister José María Aznar at the Palace of Moncloa. The President stayed at the Hotel Miguel Angel during his overnight visit.	
3	Belgium	Brussels	June 13–14	Attended the NATO Summit Meeting. Met with King Albert II and Prime Minister Guy Verhofstadt. The President visited Chocolatier Mary during his visit.	
3	Sweden	Gothenburg	June 14–15	Attended the U.S.-EU Summit Meeting. Met with King Carl XVI Gustaf and Prime Minister Göran Persson, becoming the first U.S. president to visit the country. The President stayed at the Radisson Blu Scandinavia Hotel during his overnight visit.	
3	Poland	Warsaw	June 15–16	State Visit. Met with President Aleksander Kwaśniewski at the Presidential Palace and Prime Minister Jerzy Buzek. The President delivered a foreign policy speech in front of faculty and students at Warsaw University during his visit. He also participated in a wreath-laying ceremony at the Tomb of the Unknown Soldier in Piłsudski Square. The President stayed at the Warsaw Marriott Hotel during his overnight visit.	
3	Slovenia	Kranj	June 16	Attended the summit meeting with Russian president Vladimir Putin. Also met with Prime Minister Janez Drnovšek.	
4	United Kingdom	London, Chequers, Halton, Brize Norton	July 18–20	President and Mrs. Bush arrived in London on the evening of July 18. On July 19, the President met with M.P. William Hague, Leader of the Conservative Party, at Winfield House. President and Mrs. Bush later attended an event for children at the British Museum. The President also visited the Churchill War Rooms museum. In the afternoon, President and Mrs. Bush participated in an arrival ceremony at Buckingham Palace and attended a luncheon hosted by Queen Elizabeth. They later traveled to Chequers to meet with Prime Minister Tony Blair and his wife Cherie before spending the night at the prime minister's country estate.	
4	Italy	Genoa, Castel Gandolfo, Rome	July 20–24	Attended the 27th G8 summit. Met with Pope John Paul II. Also met with Prime Minister Silvio Berlusconi and President Carlo Azeglio Ciampi.	
4	Kosovo	Camp Bondsteel	July 24	Addressed U.S. military personnel.	
5	China	Shanghai	October 18–21	Attended APEC Summit Meeting.	

=== 2002 ===
	Country	Areas visited	Dates	Details	Image
6	Japan	Tokyo	February 16–19	Met with Emperor Akihito and Prime Minister Junichiro Koizumi. Addressed the Diet.	
6	South Korea	Seoul, Dorasan, Osan	February 19–21	Met with President Kim Dae-jung. Visited the Korean Demilitarized Zone. Addressed U.S. military personnel.	
6	China	Beijing	February 21–22	Met with President Jiang Zemin and Premier Zhu Rongji.	
7	Mexico	Monterrey	March 21–22	Attended the International Conference on Financing for Development. Met with President Vicente Fox.	
7	Peru	Lima	March 23–24	Met with the presidents Alejandro Toledo of Peru, Andrés Pastrana Arango of Colombia, and Jorge Quiroga of Bolivia, and with the vice president Pedro Pinto Rubianes of Ecuador.	
7	El Salvador	San Salvador	March 24	Attended the Summit Meeting of Presidents of the Central American Republics.	
8	Germany	Berlin	May 22–23	Met with Chancellor Gerhard Schröder. Addressed the Bundestag.	
8	Russia	Moscow, Saint Petersburg	May 23–26	Summit meeting with President Vladimir Putin. Signed Strategic Offensive Reductions Treaty.	
8	France	Paris, Sainte-Mère-Église, Colleville	May 26–27	Met with President Jacques Chirac. Delivered a Memorial Day address in Normandy.	
8	Italy	Rome	May 27–28	Met with President Carlo Azeglio Ciampi and Prime Minister Silvio Berlusconi. Attended the NATO Summit Meeting and inaugurated the NATO-Russia Council.	
8	Vatican City	Apostolic Palace	May 28	Audience with Pope John Paul II.	
9	Canada	Kananaskis	June 25–27	Attended the 28th G8 summit.	
10	Mexico	Los Cabos	October 26–27	Attended the APEC Summit Meeting.	
11	Czech Republic	Prague	November 19–22	Attended the NATO and EAPC Summit Meetings.	
11	Russia	Saint Petersburg	November 22	Met with President Vladimir Putin.	
11	Lithuania	Vilnius	November 22–23	Met with the Presidents of the Baltic states, becoming the first U.S. president to visit the country.	
11	Romania	Bucharest	November 23	Met with President Ion Iliescu.	

=== 2003 ===
	Country	Areas visited	Dates	Details	Image
12	Portugal	Terceira Island	March 16	Discussed the Iraq crisis with British prime minister Tony Blair, Spanish prime minister José María Aznar and Portuguese prime minister José Manuel Barroso.	
13	United Kingdom	Belfast, Hillsborough	April 7–8	Met with Prime Minister Tony Blair to discuss the reconstruction of Iraq. Also met with Taoiseach Bertie Ahern and Northern Irish political leaders.	
14	Poland	Kraków, Oświęcim	May 31	Met with President Aleksander Kwaśniewski and Prime Minister Leszek Miller. Visited Nazi-German Auschwitz concentration camp.	
14	Russia	Saint Petersburg	May 31 – June 1	Met with President Vladimir Putin. Attended ceremonies commemorating the city's 300th anniversary.	
14	France	Evian-les-Bains	June 1–2	Attended the 29th G8 summit. Met with Chinese president Hu Jintao.	
14	Egypt	Sharm El Sheikh	June 2–3	Attended the "Red Sea Summit" with the leaders of Bahrain, Egypt, Jordan and Saudi Arabia, and with Palestinian Authority Prime Minister Mahmoud Abbas.	
14	Jordan	Aqaba	June 4	Attended meetings with Israeli prime minister Ariel Sharon and Palestinian prime minister Mahmoud Abbas. Met with King Abdullah II.	
14	Qatar	Doha	June 4–5	Met with Emir Hamad bin Khalifa Al Thani. Visited U.S. Central Command headquarters and addressed U.S. military personnel, becoming the first U.S. president to visit the country.	
15	Senegal	Dakar, Gorée Island	July 8	Met with President Abdoulaye Wade.	
15	South Africa	Pretoria	July 8–11	Met with President Thabo Mbeki.	
15	Botswana	Gaborone	July 10	Met with President Festus Mogae. Toured Mokolodi Nature Reserve.	
15	Uganda	Kampala	July 11	Met with President Yoweri Museveni.	
15	Nigeria	Abuja	July 11–12	Met with President Olusegun Obasanjo at Aso Villa. The President and Mrs. Bush also visited Abuja National Hospital and participated in a roundtable discussion with medical staff and beneficiaries of HIV/AIDS mother-to-child transmission prevention programs. The President and Mrs. Bush stayed overnight at Nicon Hilton Hotel.	
16	Japan	Tokyo	October 17–18	Met with Prime Minister Junichiro Koizumi. In the evening, President and Mrs. Bush attended a dinner hosted by the Prime Minister at Akasaka Palace. The President and Mrs. Bush stayed overnight at the U.S. Ambassador's residence.	
16	Philippines	Manila	October 18	Addressed a joint session of the Philippine Congress and met with President Gloria Macapagal Arroyo. On the evening on October 18, President and Mrs. Bush attended a state dinner in their honor at Malacanang Palace.	
16	Thailand	Bangkok	October 18–21	Attended the APEC Summit Meeting. Arrived late in the evening on October 18. On October 19, the President met with Prime Minister Thaksin Chinnawat of Thailand and President Hu Jintao of China on the sidelines of the APEC conference. In the evening of October 19, the President and Mrs. Bush attended a state dinner hosted by King Phumiphon Adunyadet and Queen Sirikit at the Grand Palace. On October 20, the President met with President Roh Moo-hyun of South Korea and President Vicente Fox of Mexico on the sidelines of the APEC conference. In the evening, the President and Mrs. Bush attended a gala dinner and closing ceremonies at the Royal Thai Navy Convention Hall. President and Mrs. Bush stayed at the Grand Hyatt Erawan Bangkok during their visit.	
16	Singapore	Singapore	October 21–22	Met with Prime Minister Goh Chok Tong. In the evening, the President met with President Sellapan Rama Nathan and his wife Urmila Nandey at The Istana. The President and Mrs. Bush stayed overnight at the Shangri-La Hotel during their visit.	
16	Indonesia	Denpasar	October 22	Met with President Megawati Sukarnoputri and Muslim religious leaders during a brief stopover at the Patra Bali Airport Resort and Villa adjacent to Bali Airport.	
16	Australia	Canberra	October 22-23	Met with Prime Minister John Howard. Addressed joint meeting of Parliament.	
17	United Kingdom	London, Sedgefield	November 18–21	Main article: State visit by George W. Bush to the United Kingdom State Visit. Met with Queen Elizabeth II and Prime Minister Tony Blair.	
18	Iraq	Baghdad	November 27	The President travelled in secret from his ranch in Texas to Andrews Air Force Base, where reporters were told not to use their devices or leak news of the trip, and then to Iraq. Met with members of the Coalition Provisional Authority and the Iraqi Governing Council, becoming the first U.S. president to visit the country. Addressed U.S. military personnel.	

=== 2004 ===
	Country	Areas visited	Dates	Details	Image
19	Mexico	Monterrey	January 12–13	Attended the Special Summit of the Americas.	
20	Italy	Rome	June 4–5	Met with President Carlo Azeglio Ciampi and Prime Minister Silvio Berlusconi.	
20	Vatican City	Apostolic Palace	June 4	Met with Pope John Paul II.	
20	France	Paris, Colleville, Caen, Arromanches	June 5–6	Met with President Jacques Chirac. Attended the 60th anniversary of D-Day ceremonies.	
21	Ireland	Shannon, Dromoland Castle	June 25–26	Attended the U.S.-EU Summit Meeting. Met with Taoiseach Bertie Ahern.	
21	Turkey	Ankara, Istanbul	June 26–29	Met with President Ahmet Necdet Sezer and Prime Minister Recep Tayyip Erdoğan. Attended the NATO Summit meeting.	
22	Chile	Santiago	November 19–22	Attended the APEC Summit Meeting.	
22	Colombia	Cartagena	November 22	Met with President Álvaro Uribe.	
23	Canada	Ottawa, Gatineau, Halifax	November 30 – December 1	Met with Lieutenant Governor of Nova Scotia Myra Freeman and Prime Minister Paul Martin. The President spent the night at Lornado, the official residence of the U.S. ambassador in Ottawa, before traveling to Halifax to thank Canadians for their hospitality in hosting stranded Americans on September 11, 2001.	

== Second term (2005–2009) ==
=== 2005 ===
	Country	Areas visited	Dates	Details	Image
24	Belgium	Brussels	February 20–23	Attended the NATO and EU Summit Meetings.	
24	Germany	Mainz, Wiesbaden	February 23	Met with Chancellor Gerhard Schröder. Visited U.S. military personnel.	
24	Slovakia	Bratislava	February 23–24	Attended the summit meeting with Russian president Vladimir Putin, becoming the first U.S. president to visit the country. Also met with Prime Minister Mikuláš Dzurinda.	
25	Vatican City	St. Peter's Basilica	April 6–8	Attended the funeral of Pope John Paul II.	
25	Italy	Rome	April 6–8	Met with President Carlo Azeglio Ciampi and Prime Minister Silvio Berlusconi.	
26	Latvia	Riga	May 6–7	Met with the Presidents of the Baltic states.	
26	Netherlands	Maastricht, Valkenburg, Margraten	May 7–8	Met with Prime Minister Jan Peter Balkenende. Delivered address at the Netherlands American Cemetery, marking the 60th anniversary of the end of World War II in Europe.	
26	Russia	Moscow	May 8–9	Met with President Vladimir Putin. Attended the 60th anniversary of VE Day ceremonies.	
26	Georgia	Tbilisi	May 9–10	Met with President Mikheil Saakashvili, becoming the first U.S. president to visit the country.	
27	Denmark	Kastrup, Fredensborg, Copenhagen	July 5–6	Met with Queen Margrethe II and Prime Minister Anders Fogh Rasmussen.	
27	United Kingdom	Auchterarder	July 6–8	Attended the 31st G8 summit.	
28	Argentina	Mar del Plata	November 3–5	Attended the 4th Summit of the Americas. Met with President Nestor Kirchner.	
28	Brazil	Brasília	November 5–6	Met with President Luiz Inácio Lula da Silva.	
28	Panama	Panama City	November 6–7	Met with President Martín Torrijos.	
29	Japan	Kyoto	November 15–16	Met with Prime Minister Junichiro Koizumi.	
29	South Korea	Pusan, Gyeongju, Osan	November 16–20	Attended the APEC Summit Meeting. Met with Russian President Vladimir Putin. Addressed U.S. military personnel.	
29	China	Beijing	November 20–21	Met with President Hu Jintao and Premier Wen Jiabao.	
29	Mongolia	Ulaanbaatar	November 21	Met with President Nambaryn Enkhbayar and Prime Minister Tsakhiagiin Elbegdorj, becoming the first U.S. president to visit the country.	

=== 2006 ===
	Country	Areas visited	Dates	Details	Image
30	Ireland	Shannon	February 28	Met with U.S. Marines who were en route to Iraq.	
30	Afghanistan	Bagram, Kabul	March 1	Met with President Hamid Karzai. Dedicated new U.S. Embassy. Addressed U.S. military personnel.	
30	India	New Delhi, Hyderabad	March 1–3	Met with Prime Minister Manmohan Singh. Signed U.S.-India Civil Nuclear Agreement.	
30	Pakistan	Islamabad	March 3–4	Met with President Pervez Musharraf.	
31	Mexico	Cancún, Chichen-Itza	March 30–31	Attended the 2nd North American Leaders' Summit with President Vicente Fox and Canadian prime minister Stephen Harper; visited the Chichen-Itza archaeological site.	
32	Iraq	Baghdad	June 13	Met with Prime Minister Nouri al-Maliki. Addressed U.S. military personnel.	
33	Austria	Vienna	June 20–21	Attended the U.S.-EU Summit Meeting.	
33	Hungary	Budapest	June 21–22	Met with President László Sólyom and Prime Minister Ferenc Gyurcsány. Attended the 50th anniversary of the Hungarian Uprising.	
34	Germany	Stralsund, Trinwillershagen	July 12–14	Met with Chancellor Angela Merkel.	
34	Russia	Saint Petersburg	July 14–17	Attended the 32nd G8 summit. Met with Chinese President Hu Jintao, Brazilian President Luiz Inácio Lula da Silva and Indian Prime Minister Manmohan Singh.	
35	Russia	Moscow	November 15	Met with President Vladimir Putin.	
35	Singapore	Singapore	November 16–17	Met with the chairman of the Singapore Council of Presidential Advisers, J. Y. Pillay and Prime Minister Lee Hsien Loong. Addressed National University of Singapore.	
35	Vietnam	Hanoi, Ho Chi Minh City	November 17–20	Attended the APEC Summit Meeting.	
35	Indonesia	Jakarta, Bogor	November 20	Met with President Susilo Bambang Yudhoyono.	
36	Estonia	Tallinn	November 27–28	Met with President Toomas Hendrik Ilves, becoming the first U.S. president to visit the country.	
36	Latvia	Riga	November 28–29	Attended the NATO Summit Meeting.	
36	Jordan	Amman	November 29–30	Met with King Abdullah II and Iraqi Prime Minister Nouri al-Maliki.	

=== 2007 ===
	Country	Areas visited	Dates	Details	Image
37	Brazil	São Paulo	March 8–9	Met with President Luiz Inácio Lula da Silva.	
37	Uruguay	Montevideo	March 9–11	Met with President Tabaré Vázquez.	
37	Colombia	Bogotá	March 11	Met with President Álvaro Uribe.	
37	Guatemala	Guatemala City, Santa Cruz Balanyá, Iximche	March 11–12	Informal visit; met with President Óscar Berger; visited the Iximche archaeological site.	
37	Mexico	Mérida, Uxmal	March 12–14	Met with President Felipe Calderón; visited the Uxmal archaeological site.	
38	Czech Republic	Prague	June 4–5	Met with President Václav Klaus and Prime Minister Mirek Topolánek. Addressed Conference on Democracy and Security.	
38	Germany	Heiligendamm	June 5–8	Attended the 33rd G8 summit. Met with Chinese President Hu Jintao.	
38	Poland	Gdańsk, Jurata	June 8	Met with President Lech Kaczyński.	
38	Italy	Rome	June 8–10	Met with President Giorgio Napolitano and Prime Minister Romano Prodi.	
38	Vatican City	Apostolic Palace	June 9	Audience with Pope Benedict XVI.	
38	Albania	Tirana	June 10	Met with President Alfred Moisiu and Prime Minister Sali Berisha, becoming the first U.S. president to visit the country.	
38	Bulgaria	Sofia	June 10–11	Met with President Georgi Parvanov and Prime Minister Sergei Stanishev.	
39	Canada	Montebello	August 20–21	Attended North American Leaders' Summit with Prime Minister Stephen Harper and Mexican president Felipe Calderón.	
40	Iraq	Al Asad Airbase	September 3	Met with Gen. David Petraeus, Secretary of State Condoleezza Rice, Secretary of Defense Robert Gates, senior U.S. officials, Iraqi political leaders. Addressed U.S military personnel.	
40	Australia	Sydney	September 3–8	Attended the APEC Summit Meeting.	

=== 2008 ===
	Country	Areas visited	Dates	Details	Image
41	Israel	Tel Aviv, Jerusalem	January 9–11	Met with Prime Minister Ehud Olmert and President Shimon Peres. Visited Yad Vashem.	
41	Palestinian National Authority	Ramallah, Bethlehem	January 10	Met with President Mahmoud Abbas. Visited the Church of the Nativity.	
41	Kuwait	Kuwait City, Camp Arifjan	January 11–12	Attended Roundtable on Democracy and Development. Met with Gen. David Petraeus and United States Ambassador to Iraq Ryan Crocker. Addressed U.S. military personnel.	
41	Bahrain	Manama	January 12–13	Met with King Hamad bin Isa Al Khalifa. Addressed U.S. military personnel, becoming the first U.S. president to visit the country.	
41	United Arab Emirates	Abu Dhabi, Dubai	January 13–14	Met with President Khalifa bin Zayed Al Nahyan and Prime Minister Mohammed bin Rashid Al Maktoum, becoming the first U.S. president to visit the country.	
41	Saudi Arabia	Riyadh, Al-Janadriyah	January 14–16	Met with King Abdullah.	
41	Egypt	Sharm El Sheikh	January 16	Met with President Hosni Mubarak.	
42	Benin	Porto-Novo	February 16	Met with President Yayi Boni, becoming the first U.S. president to visit the country.	
42	Tanzania	Dar es Salaam, Arusha	February 16–19	Met with President Jakaya Kikwete. Signed Millenimum Challenge agreement.	
42	Rwanda	Kigali	February 19	Met with President Paul Kagame. Dedicated new U.S. Embassy.	
42	Ghana	Accra	February 19–21	Met with President John Kufuor.	
42	Liberia	Monrovia	February 21	Met with President Ellen Johnson Sirleaf.	
43	Ukraine	Kyiv	April 1	Met with President Viktor Yushchenko and Prime Minister Yulia Tymoshenko.	
43	Romania	Bucharest	April 2–4	Attended the NATO Summit Meeting.	
43	Croatia	Zagreb	April 4–5	Met with President Stjepan Mesić.	
43	Russia	Sochi	April 5–6	Met with President Vladimir Putin and President-elect Dmitry Medvedev.	
44	Israel	Tel Aviv, Jerusalem, Masada	May 14–16	Met with President Shimon Peres and Prime Minister Ehud Olmert. Addressed the Knesset. Attended Israel's 60th anniversary. Visited the Masada fortification site.	
44	Saudi Arabia	Riyadh, al-Janadriyah	May 16–17	Met with King Abdullah.	
44	Egypt	Sharm El Sheikh	May 17–18	Met with President Hosni Mubarak, King Abdullah II of Jordan, Palestinian Authority president Mahmoud Abbas and Prime Minister Salam Fayyad, Afghan president Hamid Karzai and Pakistani prime minister Yousaf Raza Gillani. Addressed the World Economic Forum.	
45	Slovenia	Ljubljana	June 9–10	Met with President Danilo Türk and Prime Minister Janez Janša. Attended the EU-US Summit Meeting.	
45	Germany	Meseberg	June 10–11	Met with Chancellor Angela Merkel.	
45	Italy	Rome	June 11–13	Met with President Giorgio Napolitano and Prime Minister Silvio Berlusconi.	
45	Vatican City	Apostolic Palace	June 13	Met with Pope Benedict XVI.	
45	France	Paris	June 13–15	Met with President Nicolas Sarkozy. Addressed the OECD. Attended wreath-laying ceremonies at the Suresnes American Cemetery and Memorial and Mémorial de la France combattante.	
45	United Kingdom	London, Belfast	June 15–16	Met with Queen Elizabeth II at Windsor Castle. Met with Prime Minister Gordon Brown and Quartet Representative Tony Blair. In Belfast, met with First Minister Peter Robertson and Deputy First Minister Martin McGuinness.	
46	Japan	Tōyako	July 6–9	Attended the 34th G8 summit. Met with Tanzanian president Kikwete, Indian prime minister Manmohan Singh, Chinese president Hu Jintao and South Korean president Lee Myung-bak.	
47	South Korea	Seoul	August 5–6	Met with President Lee Myung-bak. Addressed U.S. military personnel.	
47	Thailand	Bangkok	August 6–7	Met with Prime Minister Samak Sundaravej.	
47	China	Beijing	August 7–11	Attended the opening ceremonies of the Olympic Games. Met with President Hu Jintao and Russian Prime Minister Vladimir Putin.	
48	Peru	Lima	November 21–23	Attended the APEC Summit Meeting.	
49	Iraq	Baghdad	December 14	Met with President Jalal Talabani and Prime Minister Nouri al-Maliki. Signed Strategic Framework and Security Agreements. Visited U.S. military personnel.	
49	Afghanistan	Kabul	December 14–15	Met with President Hamid Karzai. Visited U.S. military personnel.	
49	United Kingdom	RAF Mildenhall	December 15	Stopped during return to Washington D.C.. Met with military personnels.	

== Multilateral meetings ==
Multilateral meetings of the following intergovernmental organizations took place during George W. Bush's presidency (2001–2009).

Group	Year							
Group	2001	2002	2003	2004	2005	2006	2007	2008
APEC	October 20–21 (China) Shanghai	October 26–27 (Mexico) Los Cabos	October 20–21 (Thailand) Bangkok	November 20–21 (Chile) Santiago	November 18–19 (South Korea) Busan	November 18–19 (Vietnam) Hanoi	September 8–9 (Australia) Sydney	November 22–23 (Peru) Lima
G8	July 21–22 (Italy) Genoa	June 26–27 (Canada) Kananaskis	June 1–2 (France) Évian-les-Bains	June 8–10 (United States) Sea Island	July 6–8 (United Kingdom) Auchterarder	July 15–17 (Russia) Saint Petersburg	June 6–8 (Germany) Heiligendamm	July 7–9 (Japan) Tōyako
NALS	none	none	none	none	March 23 (United States) Waco	March 31 (Mexico) Cancún	August 20–21 (Canada) Montebello	April 21–22 (United States) New Orleans
NATO	June 13 (Belgium) Brussels	May 28 (Italy) Rome	none	June 28–29 (Turkey) Istanbul	February 25 (Belgium) Brussels	November 28–29 (Latvia) Riga	none	April 2–4 (Romania) Bucharest
NATO	June 13 (Belgium) Brussels	November 21–22 (Czech Republic) Prague	none	June 28–29 (Turkey) Istanbul	February 25 (Belgium) Brussels	November 28–29 (Latvia) Riga	none	April 2–4 (Romania) Bucharest
SOA (OAS)	April 20–22 (Canada) Quebec City	none	none	January 12–13 (Mexico) Monterrey	November 4–5 (Argentina) Mar del Plata	none	none	none
Others	U.S.–EU Summit; June 14–15 (Sweden) Gothenburg	Central American Summit; March 24 (El Salvador) San Salvador	Red Sea Summit; June 2–3 (Egypt) Sharm El Sheikh	U.S.–EU Summit; June 25–26 (Republic of Ireland) Dromoland Castle	none	U.S.–EU Summit; June 20–21 (Austria) Vienna	none	U.S.–EU Summit; June 9–10 (Slovenia) Ljubljana
Others	U.S.–EU Summit; June 14–15 (Sweden) Gothenburg	Central American Summit; March 24 (El Salvador) San Salvador	Red Sea Summit; June 2–3 (Egypt) Sharm El Sheikh	U.S.–EU Summit; June 25–26 (Republic of Ireland) Dromoland Castle	none	U.S.–EU Summit; June 20–21 (Austria) Vienna	none	G20 Summit; November 14–15 (United States) Washington

== See also ==
- Foreign policy of the George W. Bush administration
- Foreign policy of the United States
- List of international trips made by Colin Powell as United States Secretary of State
- List of international trips made by Condoleezza Rice as United States Secretary of State
