= List of international trips made by Colin Powell as United States Secretary of State =

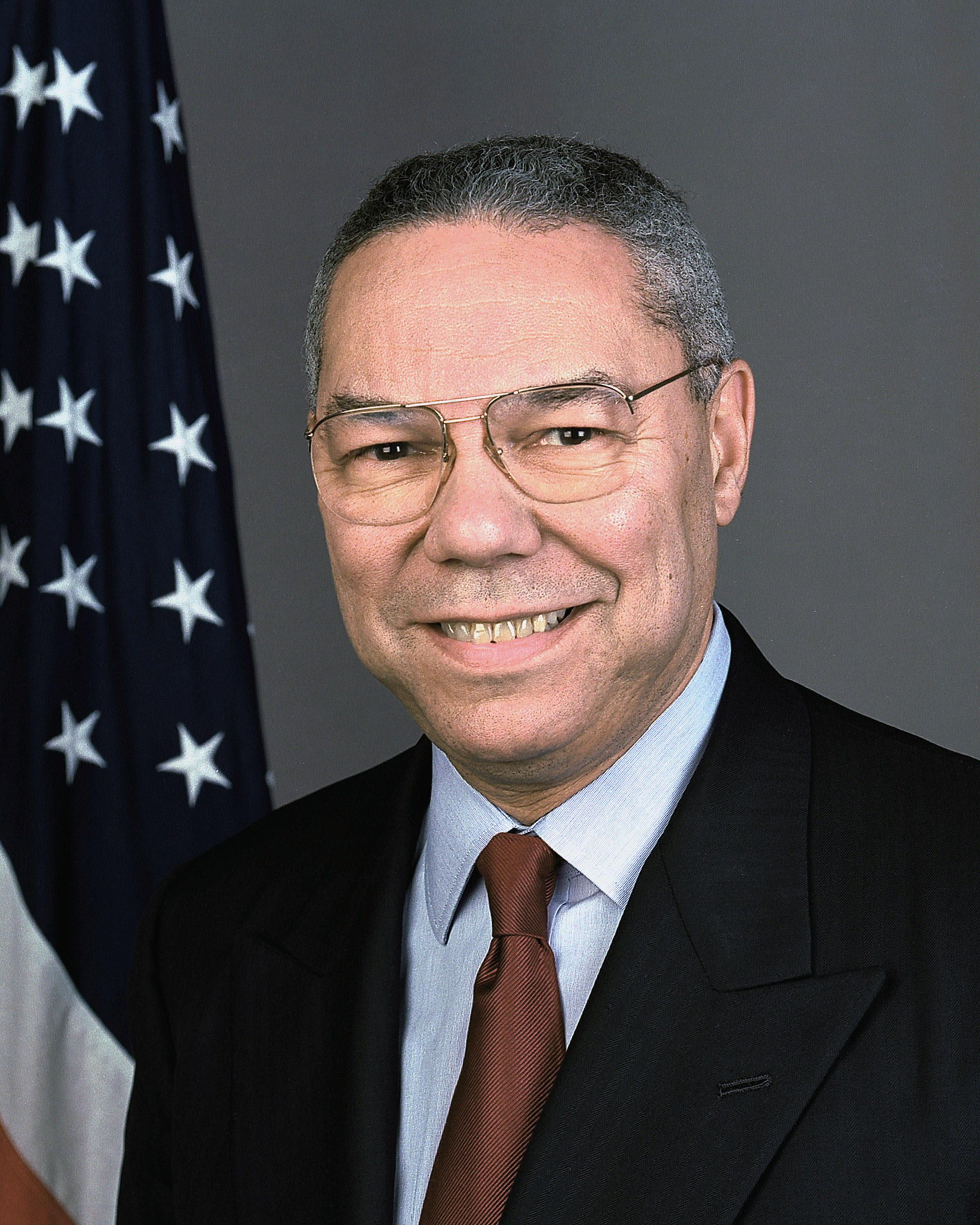
Official portrait of Colin Powell as Secretary of State, 2001

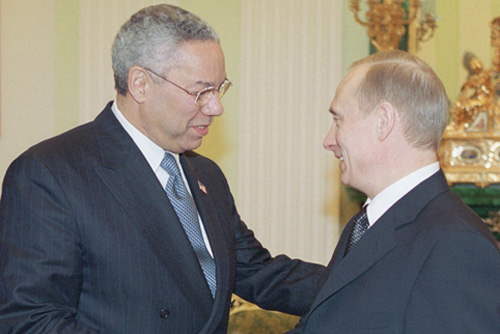
Secretary Powell with Russian president Vladimir Putin in the Kremlin, 2001

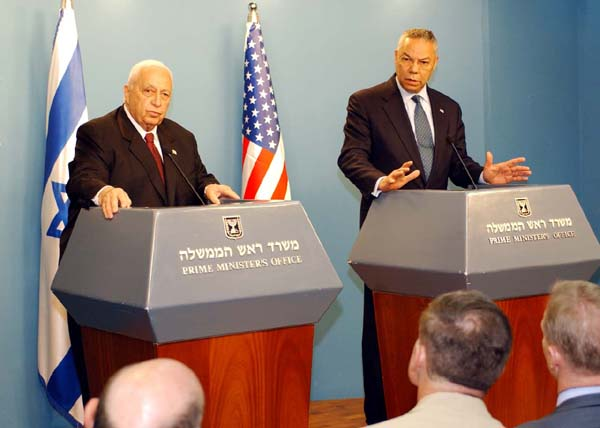
Secretary Powell with Israeli prime minister Ariel Sharon in Jerusalem, 2003

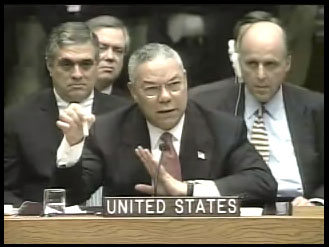
Secretary Powell holds a vial of anthrax while speaking to the United Nations Security Council

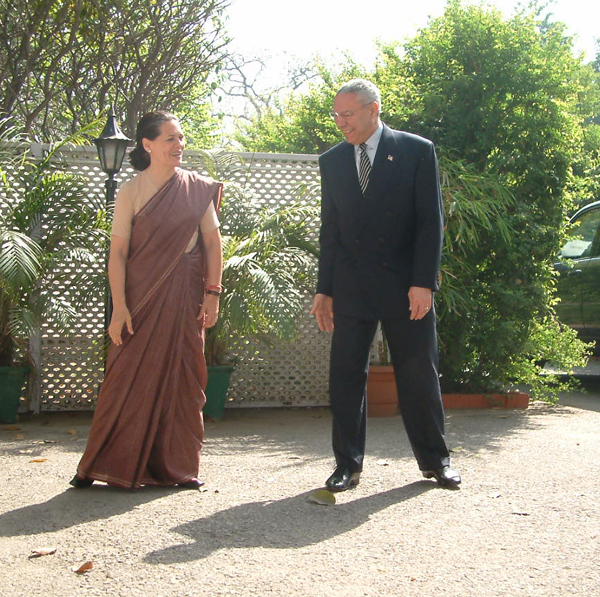
Secretary Powell meets with Indian opposition leader Sonia Gandhi in New Delhi

This is a list of international visits undertaken by Colin Powell (in office 2001–2005) while serving as the 65th United States secretary of state. The list includes both private travel and official state visits. The list includes only foreign travel which he made during his tenure in the position.

== Summary ==
The number of visits per country or territory where Secretary Powell traveled are:

- One visit to Albania, Algeria, Angola, Argentina, Australia, Bahamas, Bangladesh, Barbados, Botswana, Brazil, Brunei, Cambodia, Cape Verde, Colombia, Czech Republic, Denmark, Ecuador, El Salvador, Gabon, Georgia, Greenland, Grenada, Honduras, Iceland, Kazakhstan, Lithuania, Macedonia, Malaysia, Maldives, Mali, Nepal, Nicaragua, Nigeria, Oman, Philippines, Qatar, Senegal, Serbia and Montenegro, Singapore, Slovenia, Sri Lanka, Sudan, Sweden, Tunisia, Ukraine, Uzbekistan and Vietnam
- Two visits to Afghanistan, Bosnia and Herzegovina, Bulgaria, Chile, Haiti, Hungary, Ireland, Lebanon, Netherlands, Panama, Peru, Romania, Switzerland and Uganda
- Three visits to Indonesia, Iraq, Kenya, Morocco, Poland, South Africa, Syria, Thailand, the United Kingdom and Vatican City
- Four visits to India, Italy, Pakistan, Saudi Arabia and South Korea
- Five visits to Canada, China, Germany, Japan, Kuwait and Spain
- Six visits to France, Mexico and Russia
- Seven visits to Israel, Jordan and the Palestinian National Authority
- Eight visits to Belgium
- Nine visits to Egypt

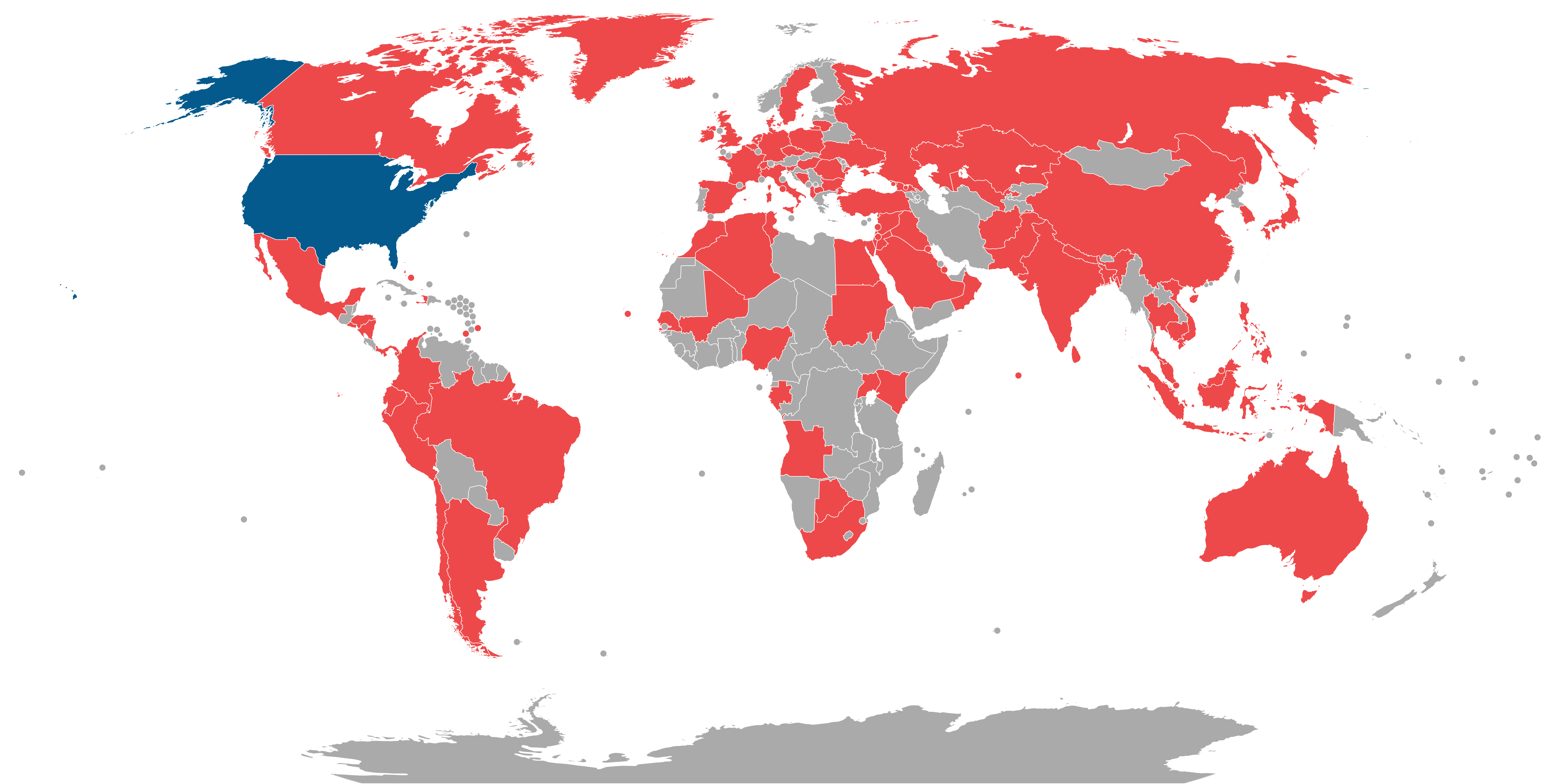
World map highlighting countries visited by Colin Powell as Secretary of State, 2001–2005: United States Countries visited No visits

== Table ==
	Country	Locations	Details	Dates
1	Mexico	San Cristóbal	Accompanied President Bush to a meeting with President Fox.	February 16, 2001
2	Egypt	Cairo	Met with senior Egyptian officials and with Russian Foreign Minister Ivanov.	February 24, 2001
2	Israel	Tel Aviv, Jerusalem	Met with Prime Minister-elect Sharon and senior Israeli officials.	February 24–25, 2001
2	Palestinian National Authority	Ramallah	Met with Chairman Arafat.	February 25, 2001
2	Jordan	Amman	Met with King Abdullah II.	February 25, 2001
2	Kuwait	Kuwait City	Attended ceremonies commemorating the 10th anniversary of the liberation of Kuwait.	February 25–26, 2001
2	Saudi Arabia	Riyadh	Met with senior Saudi officials.	February 26, 2001
2	Syria	Damascus	Met with President Bashar Assad and senior Syrian officials.	February 26, 2001
2	Belgium	Brussels	Met with NATO Foreign Ministers.	February 26–27, 2001
3	France	Paris	Met with Contact Group Foreign Ministers, with Russian Foreign Minister Ivanov and with President Chirac.	April 11–12, 2001
3	Macedonia	Skopje	Met with the foreign ministers of Croatia, Hungary, Bosnia, Slovenia, Romania, Albania, Greece, and Turkey, and with Macedonian political leaders. Later met with the UN Administrator for Kosovo and with Kosovo political leaders.	April 12–13, 2001
3	Bosnia and Herzegovina	Sarajevo	Met with the Collective Presidency, Bosnian political leaders, and with NATO and OSCE officials.	April 13, 2001
3	Ireland	Shannon	Stopped en route return to Washington.	April 13, 2001
4	Canada	Quebec City	Accompanied President Bush to the Summit of the Americas.	April 20–22, 2001
5	Mali	Bamako	Met with President Konaré and toured the Malaria Research and Training Center at the University of Mali.	May 23–24, 2001
5	South Africa	Pretoria	Met with President Mbeki and delivered an address at Witwatersrand University.	May 24–25, 2001
5	Kenya	Nairobi	Met with President Moi, Kenyan civil and political leaders, and UN and NGO representatives.	May 25–27, 2001
5	Uganda	Kampala	Met with President Museveni and Ugandan political leaders.	May 27–28, 2001
5	Hungary	Budapest	Attended North Atlantic Council ministerial meetings.	May 28–30, 2001
6	Spain	Madrid	Accompanied President Bush.	June 12–13, 2001
6	Belgium	Brussels	Accompanied President Bush to NATO Summit Meeting.	June 13–14, 2001
6	Sweden	Gothenburg	Accompanied President Bush to U.S.–EU Summit Meeting.	June 14–15, 2001
6	Poland	Warsaw	Accompanied President Bush during a State Visit.	June 15–16, 2001
6	Slovenia	Ljubljana	Accompanied President Bush to meetings with President Kučan, Prime Minister Drnovšek, and Russian President Putin.	June 16, 2001
7	Egypt	Alexandria	Met with President Mubarak and Foreign Minister Maher.	June 27, 2001
7	Israel	Jerusalem	Met with Prime Minister Sharon and Foreign Minister Peres.	June 27–28, 2001
7	Palestinian National Authority	Ramallah	Met with Chairman Arafat.	June 28, 2001
7	Jordan	Amman	Met with King Abdullah II.	June 29, 2001
7	France	Paris	Met with Saudi Arabian Crown Prince Abdullah.	June 29, 2001
8	Italy	Rome	Attended G-8 Foreign Ministers' Meeting.	July 17–19, 2001
9	Japan	Tokyo	Met with Prime Minister Koizumi and senior officials.	July 23–24, 2001
9	Vietnam	Hanoi	Attended ASEAN Regional Forum and Post–Ministerial Conference.	July 24–27, 2001
9	South Korea	Seoul	Met with President Kim Dae-jung and senior officials.	July 27–28, 2001
9	China	Beijing	Met with President Jiang Zemin and senior officials	July 28–29, 2001
9	Australia	Canberra	Attended Australia–U.S. Ministerial Meeting.	July 29–30, 2001
10	Peru	Lima	Attended OAS General Assembly meeting.	September 10–11, 2001
11	Pakistan	Islamabad	Discussed cooperation against terrorism with President Musharraf and senior officials.	October 15–16, 2001
11	India	New Delhi	Discussed cooperation against terrorism with Prime Minister Vajpayee and senior officials.	October 16–17, 2001
11	China	Shanghai	Attended APEC Summit Meeting.	October 17–21, 2001
12	Romania	Bucharest	Attended OSCE Ministerial Council Meeting.	December 4–5, 2001
12	Turkey	Ankara	Met with Foreign Minister Cem and senior officials.	December 5, 2001
12	Belgium	Brussels	Attended NATO Ministerial Meeting; addressed EU Justice and Home Affairs Council.	December 5–7, 2001
12	Uzbekistan	Tashkent	Met with President Karimov and senior officials.	December 7–8, 2001
12	Kazakhstan	Astana	Met with President Nazarbayev and senior officials.	December 8–9, 2001
12	Russia	Moscow	Met with President Putin, Foreign Minister Ivanov, and senior officials.	December 9–10, 2001
12	Germany	Berlin	Met with Chancellor Schröder and Foreign Minister Fischer.	December 10–11, 2001
12	France	Paris	Met with President Chirac and Foreign Minister Védrine.	December 11, 2001
12	United Kingdom	London	Met with Prime Minister Blair and Foreign Secretary Straw.	December 11, 2001
13	Pakistan	Islamabad	Met with President Musharraf and senior officials. Returned to Pakistan after visiting Afghanistan.	January 15–17, 2002
13	Afghanistan	Kabul	Met with leaders of the Afghan Interim Authority. Announced the upgrading of the U.S. Liaison Office to Embassy status.	January 17, 2002
13	India	New Delhi	Met with Prime Minister Vajpayee, Foreign Minister Singh, and senior officials.	January 17–18, 2002
13	Nepal	Kathmandu	Met with Prime Minister Deuba and senior officials.	January 18, 2002
13	Japan	Tokyo	Attended the International Conference on Reconstruction Assistance to Afghanistan.	January 19–21, 2002
14	Bahamas	Nassau	Attended a meeting of CARICOM Foreign Ministers	February 6–7, 2002
15	Japan	Tokyo	Accompanied President Bush.	February 18–19, 2002
15	South Korea	Seoul	Accompanied President Bush.	February 19–21, 2002
15	China	Beijing	Accompanied President Bush.	February 21–22, 2002
16	Mexico	Monterrey	Accompanied President Bush to the UN Conference on International Development.	March 21–22, 2002
16	Peru	Lima	Accompanied President Bush to meetings with the Presidents of Peru, Colombia, and Bolivia, and the Vice President of Ecuador.	March 22–23, 2002
16	El Salvador	San Salvador	Accompanied President Bush to meetings with Central American heads of state.	March 24, 2002
17	Morocco	Casablanca	Met with senior Moroccan and Saudi officials.	April 8–9, 2002
17	Egypt	Cairo	Met with President Mubarak and Foreign Minister Maher.	April 9, 2002
17	Spain	Madrid	Attended U.S.–EU Ministerial Meeting. Met with UN Secretary-General Annan and Russian Foreign Minister Ivanov. Signed Defense Cooperation agreements with Spain.	April 9–11, 2002
17	Jordan	Amman	Met with King Abdullah II and Foreign Minister Muasher.	April 11–12, 2002
17	Israel	Tel Aviv, Jerusalem, Safed	Met with Prime Minister Sharon, Foreign Minister Peres, and senior Israeli officials.	April 12–15, 2002
17	Palestinian National Authority	Ramallah	Met with Chairman Arafat.	April 14, 2002
17	Lebanon	Beirut	Met with President Lahoud, Prime Minister Hariri and Foreign Minister Hammoud.	April 15, 2002
17	Syria	Damascus	Met with President Assad and Foreign Minister Sharaa.	April 15, 2002
17	Israel	Jerusalem	Continued meetings with Israeli officials and Palestinian representatives.	April 16–17, 2002
17	Palestinian National Authority	Ramallah	Met with Chairman Arafat.	April 17, 2002
17	Egypt	Cairo	Met with the Foreign Ministers of Egypt and Jordan.	April 17, 2002
18	Canada	Gander	Gave an interview en route to Iceland.	May 13, 2002
18	Iceland	Reykjavík	Attended NATO Foreign Ministers' Meeting and meetings of the NATO–Ukraine Commission and Euro–Atlantic Partnership Council. Also met with Russian Foreign Minister Ivanov.	May 13–15, 2002
19	Germany	Berlin	Accompanied President Bush.	May 22–23, 2002
19	Russia	Moscow, Saint Petersburg	Accompanied President Bush to a Summit Meeting.	May 23–26, 2002
19	France	Paris	Accompanied President Bush.	May 26–28, 2002
19	Italy	Rome	Accompanied President Bush to a NATO Summit Meeting and the inauguration of the NATO–Russia Council.	May 28, 2002
19	Vatican City State	Vatican City	Met with Secretary of State Sodano.	May 28, 2002
20	Barbados	Bridgetown	Attended OAS General Assembly and signed the Inter–American Convention Against Terrorism.	June 2–3, 2002
21	Canada	Whistler	Attended a G-8 Foreign Ministers' Meeting.	June 12–13, 2002
22	India	New Delhi	Met with Prime Minister Vajpayee and senior officials.	July 26–28, 2002
22	Pakistan	Islamabad	Met with President Musharraf and senior officials.	July 28, 2002
22	Thailand	Bangkok	Met with Foreign Minister Sathirathai.	July 28–29, 2002
22	Malaysia	Kuala Lumpur	Met with Prime Minister Mahathir and Foreign Minister Albar.	July 29–30, 2002
22	Singapore	Singapore	Met with Prime Minister Goh Chok Tong.	July 30, 2002
22	Brunei	Bandar Seri Begawan	Attended ASEAN Regional Forum and Post–Ministerial Conference. Met with North Korean foreign minister Paek Nam-sun.	July 30 – August 1, 2002
22	Indonesia	Jakarta	Met with President Sukarnoputri and senior officials.	August 2, 2002
22	Philippines	Manila, Cebu	Met with President Arroyo and senior officials.	August 2–3, 2002
23	South Africa	Johannesburg	Attended the World Summit on Sustainable Development.	September 3–5, 2002
23	Angola	Luanda	Met with President dos Santos and attended a meeting of the Joint Commission for the Implementation of the Lusaka Protocols.	September 5, 2002
23	Gabon	Libreville	Met with President Bongo and Foreign Minister Ping. Visited Pongara National Park.	September 5–6, 2002
23	Cape Verde	Praia	Met with Foreign Minister Sousa.	September 6, 2002
24	Mexico	Los Cabos	Attended APEC Ministerial and Summit Meetings.	October 23–26, 2002
26	Canada	Ottawa	Met with Foreign Minister Graham.	November 14, 2002
27	Czech Republic	Prague	Accompanied President Bush to the NATO Summit meeting.	November 19–22, 2002
27	Russia	Saint Petersburg	Accompanied President Bush to a meeting with President Putin.	November 22, 2002
27	Lithuania	Vilnius	Accompanied President Bush to a meeting with the presidents of the Baltic States.	November 22–23, 2002
27	Romania	Bucharest	Accompanied President Bush to a meeting with President Iliescu.	November 23, 2002
28	Mexico	Mexico City	Attended a meeting of the U.S.–Mexico Binational Commission.	November 25–26, 2002
29	Colombia	Bogotá	Met with President Uribe and Foreign Minister Barcos.	December 3–4, 2002
30	Switzerland	Davos	Attended the World Economic Forum.	January 25–26, 2003
31	Japan	Tokyo	Met with senior Japanese officials.	February 22–23, 2003
31	China	Beijing	Met with President Jiang Zemin and senior Chinese officials.	February 23–24, 2003
31	South Korea	Seoul	Attended the inauguration of President Roh Moo-hyun.	February 24–25, 2003
32	Turkey	Ankara	Discussed the conflict in Iraq and economic aid with senior Turkish officials.	April 1–2, 2003
32	Serbia and Montenegro	Belgrade	Met with Serbian President Marović and Prime Minister Živković.	April 2, 2003
32	Belgium	Brussels	Discussed the conflict in Iraq with NATO, EU, and Russian Foreign Ministers.	April 2–3, 2003
33	United Kingdom	Belfast, Hillsborough	Accompanied President Bush to meetings with Prime Minister Blair and with Irish prime minister Ahern and Northern Irish political leaders.	April 7–8, 2003
34	Spain	Madrid	Met with Prime Minister Aznar and Foreign Minister Palacio.	May 1–2, 2003
34	Albania	Tirana	Signed the Adriatic Charter of Partnership with the Foreign Ministers of Albania, Croatia, and Macedonia.	May 2, 2003
34	Syria	Damascus	Met with President Assad and Foreign Minister Sharaa.	May 2–3, 2003
34	Lebanon	Beirut	Met with President Lahoud and Foreign Minister Obeid.	May 3, 2003
35	Israel	Jerusalem	Met with Prime Minister Sharon and senior Israeli officials; attended a Quartet working group meeting.	May 10–12, 2003
35	Palestinian National Authority	Jericho	Met with Prime Minister Abbas.	May 11, 2003
35	Egypt	Cairo	Met with President Mubarak and Foreign Minister Maher.	May 12, 2003
35	Jordan	Amman	Met with King Abdullah II and senior Jordanian officials.	May 12–13, 2003
35	Saudi Arabia	Riyadh	Met with Crown Prince Abdullah and visited the Vinnell Compound after a terrorist attack.	May 13, 2003
35	Russia	Moscow	Met with President Putin and Foreign Minister Ivanov.	May 13–15, 2003
35	Bulgaria	Sofia	Met with Prime Minister Saxe-Coburg-Gotha and Foreign Minister Passy; commemorated the 100th anniversary of U.S.–Bulgaria relations.	May 15, 2003
35	Germany	Berlin	Met with Chancellor Schröder and Foreign Minister Fischer.	May 15–16, 2003
36	France	Paris	Attended a G-8 Foreign Ministers' Meeting.	May 22–23, 2003
37	Poland	Kraków	Accompanied President Bush.	May 30–31, 2003
37	Russia	Saint Petersburg	Accompanied President Bush.	May 31 – June 1, 2003
37	Italy	Rome	Met with Foreign Minister Frattini.	June 1–2, 2003
37	Vatican City State	Vatican City	Briefed Pope John Paul II on the Middle East Summit and relief efforts in Iraq.	June 2, 2003
37	Egypt	Sharm el-Sheikh	Accompanied President Bush to meetings with the leaders of Bahrain, Egypt, Jordan and Saudi Arabia, and with Palestinian prime minister Abbas.	June 2–4, 2003
37	Jordan	Aqaba	Accompanied President Bush to meetings with Israeli prime minister Sharon and Palestinian prime minister Abbas.	June 4, 2003
37	Qatar	Doha	Accompanied President Bush.	June 4–5, 2003
38	Chile	Santiago de Chile	Attended OAS General Assembly meeting and met with President Lagos.	June 8–10, 2003
38	Argentina	Buenos Aires	Met with President Kirchner.	June 10, 2003
39	Cambodia	Phnom Penh	Attended ASEAN Regional Forum meeting.	June 17–19, 2003
39	Bangladesh	Dhaka	Met with Prime Minister Zia and senior officials.	June 19, 2003
39	Jordan	Shuneh, Suweima, Petra	Attended the World Economic Forum, met with Quartet representatives, and visited Petra.	June 19–23, 2003
39	Israel	Jerusalem	Met with Prime Minister Sharon and senior Israeli officials.	June 20, 2003
39	Palestinian National Authority	Jericho	Met with Prime Minister Abbas and senior Palestinian officials.	June 20, 2003
40	Senegal	Dakar, Gorée	Accompanied President Bush.	July 8, 2003
40	South Africa	Pretoria	Accompanied President Bush.	July 8–11, 2003
40	Botswana	Gaborone	Accompanied President Bush.	July 10, 2003
40	Uganda	Kampala	Accompanied President Bush.	July 11, 2003
40	Nigeria	Abuja	Accompanied President Bush.	July 11–12, 2003
41	Switzerland	Geneva	Met with UN Secretary-General Annan and the foreign ministers of the Permanent Members of the Security Council.	September 13, 2003
41	Kuwait	Kuwait City	Stopped en route to Iraq.	September 14, 2003
41	Iraq	Baghdad, Halabja	Met with U.S. military and civilian authorities and with the Iraqi Governing Council; also met with Kurdish leaders in Halabja.	September 14–15, 2003
41	Kuwait	Kuwait City	Met with Foreign Minister Sabah.	September 15, 2003
42	Thailand	Bangkok	Attended the APEC Summit Meeting.	October 17–21, 2003
42	Kenya	Nairobi, Naivasha	Attended Sudanese peace talks and met with President Kibaki.	October 21–22, 2003
42	Egypt	Sharm el-Sheikh	Met with President Mubarak.	October 22, 2003
42	Spain	Madrid	Attended the International Conference for the Reconstruction of Iraq.	October 22–24, 2003
43	Panama	Panama City	Attended a ceremony honoring the centennial of Panamanian independence. Greeted Taiwanese president Chen Shui-bian.	November 3, 2003
43	Nicaragua	Managua	Met with President Bolaños.	November 3–4, 2003
43	Honduras	Tegucigalpa	Met with President Maduro.	November 4, 2003
44	Belgium	Brussels	Met with EU Foreign Ministers.	November 18, 2003
44	United Kingdom	London	Accompanied President Bush on a State Visit.	November 18–20, 2003
45	Netherlands	Maastricht	Attended an OSCE Meeting.	December 2, 2003
45	Tunisia	Tunis	Met with President Ben Ali.	December 2, 2003
45	Morocco	Marrakesh	Met with King Mohammed VI and Foreign Minister Benaissa.	December 2–3, 2003
45	Algeria	Algiers	Met with President Bouteflika and Foreign Minister Belkhadem.	December 3, 2003
45	Belgium	Brussels	Attended NATO Ministerial meeting.	December 3–4, 2003
46	Mexico	Monterrey	Accompanied President Bush to the Special Summit of the Americas.	January 12–13, 2004
47	Georgia	Tbilisi	Attended the inauguration of President Saakashvili and met with former president Shevardnadze.	January 24–25, 2004
47	Russia	Moscow	Met with President Putin and Foreign Minister Ivanov.	January 25–27, 2004
48	India	New Delhi	Met with Prime Minister Vajpayee and Foreign Minister Sinha.	March 15–17, 2004
48	Afghanistan	Kabul	Met with President Karzai and with U.S. military and civilian officials.	March 17, 2004
48	Pakistan	Islamabad	Met with President Musharraf and Foreign Minister Kasuri.	March 17–18, 2004
48	Kuwait	Kuwait City	Met with Amir Jabir al-Sabah, Prime Minister Sabah, and Foreign Minister Sabah.	March 18–20, 2004
48	Iraq	Baghdad	Met with members of the Coalition Provisional Authority and the Iraqi Governing Council.	March 19, 2004
48	Saudi Arabia	Riyadh	Met with Crown Prince Abdullah and Foreign Minister Prince Saud.	March 19, 2004
49	Spain	Madrid	Attended memorial service for victims of the March 11 bombings.	March 24, 2004
50	Germany	Berlin	Attended International Conference on Afghanistan.	March 31 – April 1, 2004
50	Belgium	Brussels	Attended NATO Ministerial and NATO–Russian Council meetings.	April 1–2, 2004
51	Haiti	Port-au-Prince	Met with Prime Minister Latortue.	April 5, 2004
52	Germany	Berlin	Attended OSCE Conference on Anti–Semitism	April 28–29, 2004
52	Denmark	Copenhagen	Met with Prime Minister Rasmussen and Foreign Minister Møller.	April 29, 2004
53	Jordan	Amman, Shuneh	Attended the World Economic Forum.	May 15–16, 2004
54	Vatican City State	Vatican City	Accompanied President Bush.	June 4, 2004
54	Italy	Rome	Accompanied President Bush.	June 4–5, 2004
54	France	Paris, Colleville, Arromanches, Caen	Accompanied President Bush.	June 5–6, 2004
54	Ecuador	Quito	Attended OAS General Assembly meeting.	June 7, 2004
55	Ireland	Shannon	Accompanied President Bush to the U.S.–EU Summit meeting.	June 25–26, 2004
55	Turkey	Ankara, Istanbul	Accompanied President Bush to the NATO Summit meeting in Istanbul.	June 26–29, 2004
55	Sudan	Khartum, El Fasher, Abu Shouk	Met with President Bashir and Foreign Minister Ismail. Visited a refugee camp in the Darfur region.	June 29–30, 2004
55	Maldives	Malé	Met with Foreign Minister Jameel.	July 1, 2004
55	Indonesia	Jakarta	Attended the ASEAN Regional and Post–Ministerial meetings.	July 1–2, 2004
55	Hungary	Budapest	Met with Foreign Minister Kovács and addressed a conference of Hungarian ambassadors.	July 26–27, 2004
55	Egypt	Cairo	Met with President Mubarak, Prime Minister Nazif, and Foreign Minister Gheit.	July 27–28, 2004
55	Saudi Arabia	Jeddah	Met with Crown Prince Abdullah, Foreign Minister Prince Saud and Iraqi Prime Minister Allawi.	July 28–29, 2004
55	Kuwait	Kuwait City	Met with Foreign Minister Sabah.	July 29–31, 2004
55	Iraq	Baghdad	Met with President Yawer and Deputy Prime Minister Salih. Returned to Kuwait afterwards.	July 30, 2004
55	Bosnia and Herzegovina	Sarajevo	Discussed Euro–Atlantic integration.	July 31, 2004
55	Poland	Warsaw	Met with Foreign Minister Cimoszewicz and attended ceremonies commemorating the 60th anniversary of the Warsaw Uprising.	July 31 – August 1, 2004
56	Greenland	Igaliku	Signed an updated agreement for the defense of Greenland.	August 6, 2004
57	Panama	Panama City	Attended the inauguration of President Martin Torrijos.	September 1, 2004
58	Brazil	Brasília, São Paulo	Met with President Lula da Silva and Foreign Minister Amorim and addressed the American Chamber of Commerce.	October 4–6, 2004
58	Grenada	St. George's	Assessed damage from hurricane Ivan.	October 6, 2004
59	Japan	Tokyo	Met with Prime Minister Koizumi and Foreign Minister Machimura.	October 23–24, 2004
59	China	Beijing	Met with President Hu and senior Chinese officials.	October 24–25, 2004
59	South Korea	Seoul	Met with President Roh and Foreign Minister Ban.	October 25–26, 2004
60	Mexico	Mexico City	Attended U.S.–Mexico Binational Commission meeting.	November 8–9, 2004
61	Chile	Santiago de Chile	Attended APEC Ministerial meetings and accompanied President Bush to the APEC Summit meeting.	November 17–21, 2004
61	Israel	Jerusalem	Met with Prime Minister Sharon and Foreign Minister Shalom.	November 21–22, 2004
61	Palestinian National Authority	Jericho	Met with Prime Minister Qureia, acting President Fattouh, and former prime minister Abbas.	November 22, 2004
61	Egypt	Sharm el-Sheikh	Attended a conference on assistance to Iraq.	November 22–23, 2004
62	Canada	Ottawa	Accompanied President Bush.	November 30, 2004
63	Haiti	Port-au-Prince	Met with President Alexandre, Prime Minister Latortue, and political leaders.	December 1, 2004
64	Bulgaria	Sofia	Attended OSCE meeting.	December 6–8, 2004
64	Belgium	Brussels	Attended North Atlantic Council, NATO–Russia and Euro–Atlantic Partnership Council meetings.	December 8–10, 2004
64	Netherlands	The Hague	Attended US–EU Ministerial meeting.	December 10, 2004
64	Morocco	Rabat	Attended Forum for the Future meeting.	December 10–11, 2004
65	Oman	Masqat	Met with Foreign Minister bin Abdallah.	January 3, 2005
65	Thailand	Bangkok, Phuket	Assessed tsunami damage and relief efforts.	January 3–4, 2005
65	Indonesia	Jakarta, Banda Aceh	Assessed tsunami damage and relief efforts. Attended ASEAN Leaders' Special Meeting on Tsunami Relief.	January 4–7, 2005
65	Sri Lanka	Colombo, Galle	Assessed tsunami damage and relief efforts.	January 7, 2005
65	Kenya	Nairobi	Attended the signing of the Sudan Comprehensive Peace Agreement.	January 7–9, 2005
66	Ukraine	Kyiv	Attended the inauguration of President Yushchenko.	January 22–23, 2005
