= List of presidential trips made by George W. Bush (2005) =

This is a list of presidential trips made by George W. Bush during 2005, the fifth year of his presidency as the 43rd president of the United States. International trips are highlighted in blue.

This list excludes trips made within Washington, D.C., the U.S. federal capital in which the White House, the official residence and principal workplace of the president, is located. It also excludes the capital's immediate surroundings in Maryland and Virginia, such as Andrews Air Force Base in Maryland, where the president typically boards Air Force One for all trips outside the area. Also excluded are trips to Camp David, the country residence of the president, and to the Bush family's Prairie Chapel Ranch near Crawford and Walker's Point Estate in Kennebunkport, Maine.

== January ==
State or country	Areas visited	Dates	Details
Illinois	Collinsville	January 5	Spoke on medical liability reform at the Gateway Center.
Michigan	Clinton Township	January 7	Spoke on asbestos litigation reform at the Macomb Community College Macomb Center for the Performing Arts.
Florida	Jacksonville	January 14	Visited Florida Community College at Jacksonville South Campus.
Ohio	Cleveland	January 27	Toured the Cleveland Clinic to view a demonstration of health care information technology.
West Virginia	White Sulphur Springs	January 28	Spoke to the Congress of Tomorrow luncheon at The Greenbrier.

== February ==
State or country	Areas visited	Dates	Details
North Dakota	Fargo	February 3	Took questions on Social security reform at North Dakota State University's Bison Sports Arena.
Montana	Great Falls	February 3	Took questions on Social Security reform at the Four Seasons Arena.
Nebraska	Omaha	February 3–4	Took questions on Social Security reform at Qwest Center Omaha.
Arkansas	Little Rock	February 4	Took questions on Social Security reform at the Robinson Center.
Florida	Tampa	February 4	Took questions on Social Security reform at the Tampa Convention Center.
Michigan	Detroit	February 8	Spoke to the Detroit Economic Club at Cobo Center.
North Carolina	Raleigh	February 10	Took questions on Social Security reform at the BTI Center for the Performing Arts.
Pennsylvania	Blue Bell	February 10	Took questions on Social Security reform at the Montgomery County Community College.
New Hampshire	Portsmouth	February 16	Took questions on Social Security reform at the Pease International Tradeport.
Belgium	Brussels	February 20–23	Attended the NATO and EU Summit Meetings.
Germany	Mainz, Wiesbaden	February 23	Met with Chancellor Gerhard Schröder. Visited U.S. military personnel.
Slovakia	Bratislava	February 23–24	Attended the summit meeting with Russian president Vladimir Putin, becoming the first U.S. president to visit the country. Also met with Prime Minister Mikuláš Dzurinda.

== March ==
State or country	Areas visited	Dates	Details
New Jersey	Newark, Westfield	March 4	Took questions on Social Security reform at the Westfield Armory.
Indiana	South Bend, Notre Dame	March 4	Took questions on Social Security reform at the University of Notre Dame's Joyce Center.
Pennsylvania	Pittsburgh	March 7	Spoke at the Community College of Allegheny County Allegheny Campus.
Ohio	Columbus	March 9	Spoke on energy policy at the Franklin County Veterans Memorial after touring Battelle Memorial Institute.
Kentucky	Louisville	March 10	Took questions on Social Security reform at the Kentucky Center for the Performing Arts.
Alabama	Montgomery	March 10	Took questions on Social Security reform at Auburn University.
Tennessee	Memphis	March 10–11	Took questions on Social Security reform at the Cannon Center for the Performing Arts.
Louisiana	Shreveport	March 11	Took questions on Social Security reform at the Centenary College of Louisiana's Gold Dome.
Florida	Pensacola, Orlando	March 18	Took questions on Social Security reform at Pensacola Junior College and the Lake Nona YMCA Family Center.
Arizona	Tucson	March 21	Visited the Morris K. Udall Recreation Center. Took questions on Social Security reform at the Tucson Convention Center alongside Senator John McCain.
Colorado	Denver	March 21	Took questions on Social Security reform at the Wings Over the Rockies Air and Space Museum alongside Senator John McCain.
New Mexico	Albuquerque	March 21	Toured the Bear Canyon Senior Center. Took questions on Social Security reform at the Kiva Auditorium.
Texas	Waco	March 23	Hosted Mexican president Vicente Fox and Canadian prime minister Paul Martin at Baylor University's Armstrong Browning Library & Museum before taking them to his ranch at Crawford.
Texas	Fort Hood	March 27	Attended Easter Sunday services at the 4th Infantry Division Memorial Chapel.
Iowa	Cedar Rapids	March 30	Took questions on Social Security reform at Kirkwood Community College.

== April ==
State or country	Areas visited	Dates	Details
West Virginia	Parkersburg	April 5	Visited Bureau of the Public Debt offices. Took questions on Social Security reform at West Virginia University at Parkersburg.
Vatican City	St. Peter's Basilica	April 6–8	Attended the funeral of Pope John Paul II.
Italy	Rome	April 6–8	Met with President Carlo Azeglio Ciampi and Prime Minister Silvio Berlusconi.
Texas	Fort Hood	April 12	Met with military personnel and families of servicemembers killed in action in Iraq.
Ohio	Cleveland, Mentor, Kirtland	April 15	Visited a local business, Yours Truly Restaurant. Took questions on Social Security reform at Lakeland Community College.
South Carolina	Columbia	April 18	Visited the Rockaway Athletic Club. Spoke on Social Security reform at the South Carolina State House.
Illinois	Springfield	April 19	Dedicated the Abraham Lincoln Presidential Library and Museum at its opening.
Tennessee	Knoxville	April 22	Spoke about Earth Day at McGhee Tyson Air National Guard Base, after weather forced the cancellation of his intended visit to Great Smoky Mountains National Park.
Texas	Galveston	April 26	Took questions on Social Security reform at the University of Texas Medical Branch's William C. Levin Hall.

== May ==
State or country	Areas visited	Dates	Details
Mississippi	Canton	May 3	Took questions on Social Security reform at a Nissan North America plant.
Latvia	Riga	May 6–7	Met with the Presidents of the Baltic states.
Netherlands	Maastricht, Valkenburg, Margraten	May 7–8	Met with Prime Minister Jan Peter Balkenende. Delivered address at the Netherlands American Cemetery, marking the 60th anniversary of the end of World War II in Europe.
Russia	Moscow	May 8–9	Met with President Vladimir Putin. Attended the 60th anniversary of VE Day ceremonies.
Georgia	Tbilisi	May 9–10	Met with President Mikheil Saakashvili, becoming the first U.S. president to visit the country.
Virginia	West Point	May 16	Toured Virginia BioDiesel refinery.
Wisconsin	Milwaukee	May 19	Took questions on Social Security reform at the Milwaukee Art Museum. Visited offices of OnMilwaukee.com.
Michigan	Grand Rapids	May 21	Gave the commencement address at Calvin College.
New York	Rochester, Greece	May 24	Took questions on Social Security reform at the Greece Athena Middle and High School Performing Arts Center.
Maryland	Annapolis	May 27	Gave the commencement address at the United States Naval Academy.

== June ==
State or country	Areas visited	Dates	Details
Kentucky	Hopkinsville	June 2	Took questions on Social Security reform at Hopkinsville Christian County Conference and Convention Center.
Missouri	St. Louis	June 2	Spoke at a fundraising reception for Senator Jim Talent at the Millennium Hotel St. Louis.
Florida	Fort Lauderdale	June 6	Attended the opening of the 35th General Assembly of the Organization of American States at the Broward County Convention Center.
Ohio	Columbus	June 9	Spoke about the Patriot Act at the Ohio State Highway Patrol Academy.
Pennsylvania	Bryn Mawr, University Park	June 14	Took questions on Social Security reform at Pennsylvania State University's Eisenhower Auditorium.
Minnesota	Minneapolis, Maple Grove	June 17	Met with volunteers participating in a training session on Medicare enrollment and spoke about the Medicare Modernization Act at Maple Grove Community Center.
Maryland	Lusby	June 22	Toured Calvert Cliffs Nuclear Power Plant.
North Carolina	Fort Bragg	June 28	Met with military personnel and families of servicemembers killed in action in Iraq and Afghanistan at the Watters Center for Family Life and Religious Education. Gave a national address on the status of the Iraq War.

== July ==
State or country	Areas visited	Dates	Details
West Virginia	Morgantown	July 4	Celebrated Independence Day at West Virginia University.
Denmark	Kastrup, Fredensborg, Copenhagen	July 5–6	Met with Queen Margrethe II and Prime Minister Anders Fogh Rasmussen.
United Kingdom	Gleneagles	July 6–8	Attended the 31st G8 summit.
Indiana	Indianapolis	July 14	Spoke at the Indiana Black Expo Corporate Luncheon at the RCA Dome.
North Carolina	Belmont, Dallas	July 15	Spoke about the Dominican Republic–Central America Free Trade Agreement at Gaston College.
Maryland	Baltimore	July 20	Viewed a U.S. Customs and Border Protection demonstration at the Dundalk Marine Terminal.
Georgia	Atlanta	July 22	Visited the Wesley Woods Center. Spoke at the Boisfeuillet Jones Atlanta Civic Center.

== August ==
State or country	Areas visited	Dates	Details
Texas	Grapevine	August 3	Received the Thomas Jefferson Freedom Award from the American Legislative Exchange Council at the Gaylord Texan Resort Hotel & Convention Center.
New Mexico	Albuquerque	August 8	Signed the Energy Policy Act of 2005 at Sandia National Laboratories.
Illinois	Chicago, Montgomery	August 10	Signed the Safe, Accountable, Flexible, Efficient Transportation Equity Act at a Caterpillar Inc. facility.
Texas	Waco	August 13	Attended the Little League Baseball Southwest Regional Championship at Marvin Norcross Stadium.
Utah	Salt Lake City	August 22	Addressed the Veterans of Foreign Wars National Convention at the Salt Palace.
Idaho	Donnelly, Nampa	August 22–24	Stayed at the Tamarack Resort. Spoke on the War on Terror at the Idaho Center.
Arizona	Glendale, El Mirage	August 29	Took questions on Medicare policy at the Pueblo El Mirage RV Resort and Country Club.
California	Ontario, Coronado, San Diego	August 29–30	Took questions on Medicare policy at the James L. Brulte Senior Center. Commemorated the 60th anniversary of V-J Day at Naval Air Station North Island.

== September ==
State or country	Areas visited	Dates	Details
Alabama	Mobile	September 2	Toured the damage from Hurricane Katrina four days earlier.
Mississippi	Biloxi	September 2	Toured the damage from Hurricane Katrina.
Louisiana	New Orleans	September 2	Toured the damage from Hurricane Katrina.
Alabama	Mobile	September 5	Toured the damage from Hurricane Katrina.
Louisiana	Baker, Baton Rouge	September 5	Met people displaced by Hurricane Katrina at the Bethany World Prayer Center.
Mississippi	Poplarville	September 5	Toured the damage from Hurricane Katrina at Pearl River Community College.
Louisiana	New Orleans	September 11–12	Boarded the USS Iwo Jima during Joint Task Force Katrina.
Mississippi	Gulfport	September 12	Toured the damage from Hurricane Katrina at Twenty-Eighth Street Elementary School.
New York	New York	September 13–14	Stayed at the Waldorf-Astoria Hotel. Attended the opening of the 60th United Nations General Assembly. Signed the Nuclear Terrorism Convention.
Mississippi	Pascagoula	September 15	Toured the Chevron oil refinery after it was damaged by Hurricane Katrina.
Louisiana	New Orleans	September 15	Boarded the USS Iwo Jima during Joint Task Force Katrina. Visited Jackson Square.
Mississippi	Gulfport	September 20	Toured the damage from Hurricane Katrina at Prime Outlets Gulfport.
Louisiana	New Orleans	September 20	Boarded the USS Iwo Jima during Joint Task Force Katrina. Toured temporary employee housing at the Folgers coffee plant.
Colorado	Colorado Springs	September 23–24	Briefed at Peterson Air Force Base on preparations for incoming Hurricane Rita.
Texas	Austin, San Antonio, Universal City	September 24–25	Visited the Texas Emergency Operations Center. Briefed at the Air Education and Training Command headquarters at Randolph Air Force Base on Hurricane Rita.
Louisiana	Baton Rouge	September 25	Visited the Federal Emergency Management Agency Joint Field Office responding to Hurricane Rita.
Texas	Beaumont	September 27	Toured the damage from Hurricane Rita.
Louisiana	Lake Charles	September 27	Toured the damage from Hurricane Rita.

== October ==
State or country	Areas visited	Dates	Details
Louisiana	New Orleans, Covington	October 10–11	Toured the damage from Hurricane Katrina. Participated in a Habitat for Humanity building project.
Mississippi	Pass Christian	October 11	Visited DeLisle Elementary School as it recovered from Hurricane Katrina.
California	Los Angeles, Simi Valley	October 20	Spoke at a Republican National Committee reception. Toured the Ronald Reagan Presidential Library.
Florida	Pompano Beach, Miami	October 27	Toured the damage from Hurricane Wilma.
Virginia	Norfolk	October 28	

== November ==
State or country	Areas visited	Dates	Details
Argentina	Mar del Plata	November 3–5	Attended the 4th Summit of the Americas. Met with President Nestor Kirchner.
Brazil	Brasília	November 5–6	Met with President Luiz Inácio Lula da Silva.
Panama	Panama City	November 6–7	Met with President Martín Torrijos.
Virginia	Richmond	November 7	Campaigned for Jerry Kilgore in 2005 Virginia gubernatorial election.
Pennsylvania	Avoca, Tobyhanna	November 11	Observed Veterans Day at the Tobyhanna Army Depot.
Alaska	Anchorage	November 14	Met with military personnel and families of servicemembers killed in action in Iraq and Afghanistan at Elmendorf Air Force Base during a stopover on the way to Japan.
Japan	Kyoto	November 15–16	Met with Prime Minister Junichiro Koizumi.
South Korea	Pusan, Gyeongju, Osan	November 16–20	Attended the APEC Summit Meeting. Met with Russian President Vladimir Putin. Addressed U.S. military personnel.
China	Beijing	November 20–21	Met with President Hu Jintao and Premier Wen Jiabao.
Mongolia	Ulaanbaatar	November 21	Met with President Nambaryn Enkhbayar and Prime Minister Tsakhiagiin Elbegdorj, becoming the first U.S. president to visit the country.
Arizona	Tucson, Phoenix	November 28–29	Spoke about Mexican border policies at Davis-Monthan Air Force Base. Attended a fundraising reception for Jon Kyl at the Arizona Biltmore Resort.
Texas	El Paso	November 29	Toured a segment of the Mexican border.
Colorado	Denver	November 29	Attended a fundraising luncheon for Marilyn Musgrave at the Comfort Inn Downtown.
Maryland	Annapolis, Baltimore	November 30	Spoke at the United States Naval Academy. Campaigned for Michael Steele for Senate at M&T Bank Stadium.

== December ==
State or country	Areas visited	Dates	Details
North Carolina	Greensboro, Kernersville	December 5	Spoke at John Deere-Hitachi Construction Machinery Corporation facility.
Minnesota	Minneapolis	December 9	Attended a fundraising reception for Mark Kennedy for the 2006 Senate election at the Hilton Minneapolis.
Pennsylvania	Philadelphia	December 12	Addressed the local World Affairs Council at the Park Hyatt Philadelphia.
