= List of presidential trips made by George W. Bush (2001) =

This is a list of presidential trips made by George W. Bush during 2001, the first year of his presidency as the 43rd president of the United States. International trips are highlighted in blue.

This list excludes trips made within Washington, D.C., the U.S. federal capital in which the White House, the official residence and principal workplace of the president, is located. It also excludes the capital's immediate surroundings in Maryland and Virginia, such as Andrews Air Force Base in Maryland, where the president typically boards Air Force One for all trips outside the area. Also excluded are trips to Camp David, the country residence of the president, and to the Bush family's Prairie Chapel Ranch near Crawford and Walker's Point Estate in Kennebunkport, Maine.

== January ==
No presidential trips

== February ==
State or country	Areas visited	Dates	Details
Virginia	Williamsburg	February 2	Attended the Republican Congressional Retreat at Kingsmill Resort.
Pennsylvania	Farmington	February 4	Attended a Democratic congressional retreat at Nemacolin Woodlands Resort.
Georgia	Fort Stewart	February 12	Addressed troops.
Virginia	Norfolk	February 13	Addressed troops at Norfolk Naval Air Station.
West Virginia	Charleston	February 14	Visited the West Virginia Army National Guard emergency operations center to watch a simulated emergency flood response exercise.
Mexico	San Cristóbal	February 16	Met with President Vicente Fox; discussed trade, energy, migration, educational opportunities, and the battle against the illegal drug trade.
Oklahoma	Oklahoma City	February 19	Spoke at the dedication and opening of the Oklahoma City National Memorial Museum, where he met with families of the victims of the Oklahoma City bombing.
Ohio	Columbus	February 20	Visited Sullivant Elementary School.
Missouri	St. Louis	February 20	Visited Moline Elementary School. Met with Archbishop Justin Rigali. Held a "tax family reunion" at Kirkwood Community Center to promote the proposed Economic Growth and Tax Relief Reconciliation Act of 2001.
Tennessee	Townsend	February 21	Visited Townsend Elementary School.
Pennsylvania	Beaver	February 28	Met with Bishop Donald Wuerl. Toured a local business, Control Concepts Corporation.
Nebraska	Omaha	February 28	Spoke at Mancuso Hall.
Iowa	Council Bluffs	February 28	Attended a leadership forum at the Old Carnegie Library.
Arkansas	Little Rock, North Little Rock	February 28–March 1	Visited Lakewood Elementary School.

== March ==
State or country	Areas visited	Dates	Details
Georgia	Atlanta	March 1	Visited the Fernbank Museum of Natural History. Attended a leadership forum at Children's Healthcare of Atlanta at Egleston.
Virginia	Hampton, Newport News	March 4	Attended the christening of the USS Ronald Reagan at Northrop Grumman Newport News.
Illinois	Chicago	March 6	Toured the Chicago Mercantile Exchange.
North Dakota	Fargo	March 8	Spoke at Bison Sports Arena at North Dakota State University.
South Dakota	Sioux Falls	March 8	Spoke at Joe Foss Field.
Louisiana	Lafayette	March 9	Spoke at Lafayette Regional Airport.
Florida	Panama City	March 12	Visited Tyndall Air Force Base. Met with the local Rotary club and Chamber of Commerce at Marina Civic Center.
New Jersey	Plainfield, East Brunswick	March 14	Toured the Grace Episcopal Church Youth Entertainment Academy. Addressed the New Jersey Chamber of Commerce at the East Brunswick Hilton.
Florida	Orlando	March 21	Addressed the American College of Cardiology convention at the Orange County Convention Center, and a Seniors First luncheon at the Sociedad Cubana de Orlando community center.
Maine	Portland	March 23	Addressed the local Chamber of Commerce at Merrill Auditorium.
Missouri	Kansas City	March 26	Toured a local business, Bajan Industries.
Montana	Billings	March 26	Visited a Tractor Supply Company warehouse. Spoke at the MetraPark Expo and Convention Center.
Michigan	Kalamazoo	March 27	Spoke at the Western Michigan University Student Recreation Center.

== April ==
State or country	Areas visited	Dates	Details
Delaware	Wilmington	April 3	Toured the H. Fletcher Brown Boys and Girls Club.
Wisconsin	Milwaukee	April 6	Announced funding for repair of the damaged Hoan Bridge alongside Secretary of Transportation Norman Mineta upon arrival at General Mitchell International Airport. Threw out one of the ceremonial first pitches on Major League Baseball Opening Day at the new Miller Park stadium.
North Carolina	Concord, Greenville	April 11	Visited Concord Middle School. Spoke at Dowdy–Ficklen Stadium at East Carolina University.
Connecticut	Waterbury, New Britain	April 18	Visited B.W. Tinker Elementary School. Spoke at the Welte Auditorium at Central Connecticut State University.
Canada	Quebec City	April 20–22	Attended the 3rd Summit of the Americas.
Louisiana	New Orleans	April 25	Spoke at Zephyr Field.
Arkansas	Little Rock	April 25	Campaigned for Tim Hutchinson in the 2002 Senate election at the Statehouse Convention Center.
Texas	Houston	April 26	Attended a "Celebration of Reading" at the Wortham Theater Center.
Texas	Austin	April 27	Spoke at the opening of the Bob Bullock Texas State History Museum.

== May ==
State or country	Areas visited	Dates	Details
Pennsylvania	Philadelphia	May 14	Announced Project Safe Neighborhoods in a speech at the Pennsylvania Convention Center. Met with Cardinal Anthony Bevilacqua.
Minnesota	St. Paul	May 17	Spoke about his administration's National Energy Policy report at the RiverCentre.
Iowa	Nevada	May 17	Spoke about energy policy at the Iowa Energy Center.
Pennsylvania	Conestoga	May 18	Spoke about energy policy at the Safe Harbor Dam.
Indiana	Notre Dame	May 20	Gave the commencement address at the University of Notre Dame at the Joyce Center.
Connecticut	New Haven	May 21	Gave the commencement address at Yale University.
Ohio	Cleveland	May 24	Spoke at the Our Lady of Angels/St. Joseph Center.
Maryland	Annapolis	May 25	Gave the commencement address at the United States Naval Academy at Navy–Marine Corps Memorial Stadium.
Arizona	Mesa	May 28	Observed Memorial Day at the Champlin Fighter Museum.
California	Los Angeles, Camp Pendleton, Three Rivers	May 28–30	Spoke to troops of the 1st Marine Division at Marine Corps Base Camp Pendleton. Met with Governor Gray Davis at the Westin Century Plaza Hotel to discuss the state's ongoing energy crisis. Addressed the Los Angeles World Affairs Council at the hotel. Visited Sequoia National Park and spoke at the Giant Forest Museum.

== June ==
State or country	Areas visited	Dates	Details
Massachusetts	Boston	June 1	Attended the funeral of Congressman Joe Moakley at St. Brigid's Church.
Florida	Florida City, Miami, Tampa	June 4–5	Visited Everglades National Park and spoke at the Royal Palm Visitor Center. Met with Hispanic community leaders at the Omni Colonnade Hotel in Miami. Met with Archbishop John Favalora. Celebrated the passage of the Economic Growth and Tax Relief Reconciliation Act of 2001 in an event at Legends Field. Visited a Habitat for Humanity building site in Tampa.
Virginia	Bedford	June 6	Attended the opening of the National D-Day Memorial.
Iowa	Dallas Center	June 8	Celebrated the passage of the Economic Growth and Tax Relief Reconciliation Act in an event on a local farm belonging to Tom and Judy Barrett.
Nebraska	Omaha	June 8	Threw out the first pitch at Game 1 of the 2001 College World Series at Johnny Rosenblatt Stadium.
Spain	Madrid	June 12–13	Met with King Juan Carlos I at the Royal Palace of Madrid and later with Prime Minister José María Aznar at the Palace of Moncloa. The President stayed at the Hotel Miguel Angel during his overnight visit.
Belgium	Brussels	June 13–14	Attended the NATO Summit Meeting. Met with King Albert II and Prime Minister Guy Verhofstadt. The President visited Chocolatier Mary during his visit.
Sweden	Gothenburg	June 14–15	Attended the U.S.-EU Summit Meeting. Met with King Carl XVI Gustaf and Prime Minister Göran Persson, becoming the first U.S. president to visit the country. The President stayed at the Radisson Blu Scandinavia Hotel during his overnight visit.
Poland	Warsaw	June 15–16	State Visit. Met with President Aleksander Kwaśniewski at the Presidential Palace and Prime Minister Jerzy Buzek. The President delivered a foreign policy speech in front of faculty and students at Warsaw University during his visit. He also participated in a wreath-laying ceremony at the Tomb of the Unknown Soldier in Piłsudski Square. The President stayed at the Warsaw Marriott Hotel during his overnight visit.
Slovenia	Kranj	June 16	Attended the summit meeting with Russian president Vladimir Putin. Also met with Prime Minister Janez Drnovšek.
Alabama	Birmingham	June 21	Visited a YMCA day camp at Oak Mountain State Park. Campaigned for Jeff Sessions in the 2002 Senate election at the Birmingham–Jefferson Convention Complex.
Michigan	Detroit	June 25	Addressed the 69th annual meeting of the United States Conference of Mayors at the Detroit Marriott at the Renaissance Center.

== July ==
State or country	Areas visited	Dates	Details
Pennsylvania	Philadelphia	July 4	Celebrated Independence Day and the 225th anniversary of the signing of the Declaration of Independence at Independence Hall. Visited Greater Exodus Baptist Church and attended a nearby block party.
New York	New York	July 10	Presided over a naturalization ceremony at Ellis Island. Posthumously presented the Congressional Gold Medal to Cardinal John O'Connor at St. Patrick's Cathedral.
Maryland	Baltimore	July 13	Spoke about Medicare reform at Johns Hopkins Hospital.
United Kingdom	London, Chequers, Halton, Brize Norton	July 18–20	President and Mrs. Bush arrived in London on the evening of July 18. On July 19, the President met with M.P. William Hague, Leader of the Conservative Party, at Winfield House. President and Mrs. Bush later attended an event for children at the British Museum. The President also visited the Churchill War Rooms museum. In the afternoon, President and Mrs. Bush participated in an arrival ceremony at Buckingham Palace and attended a luncheon hosted by Queen Elizabeth. They later traveled to Chequers to meet with Prime Minister Tony Blair and his wife Cherie before spending the night at the prime minister's country estate.
Italy	Genoa, Castel Gandolfo, Rome	July 20–24	Attended the 27th G8 summit. Met with Pope John Paul II. Also met with Prime Minister Silvio Berlusconi and President Carlo Azeglio Ciampi.
UNMIK	Camp Bondsteel	July 24	Addressed U.S. military personnel.

== August ==
State or country	Areas visited	Dates	Details
Texas	Waco	August 7	Golfed at Ridgewood Country Club.
Texas	Waco	August 8	Participated in a Habitat for Humanity building project, during which he sustained a minor injury to his finger.
Texas	Meridian	August 13	Golfed at the Bosque Valley Golf Club.
Colorado	Estes Park, Denver	August 14	Visited Rocky Mountain National Park, where he attended a YMCA picnic. Attended a Major League Baseball game at Coors Field. Spoke at a fundraising dinner for Wayne Allard and Governor Bill Owens at the Adam's Mark Hotel.
New Mexico	Albuquerque	August 15	Visited Griegos Elementary School. Addressed the Hispano Chamber of Commerce at the ribbon-cutting of the Barelas Job Opportunity Center. Spoke at a fundraising dinner for Senator Pete Domenici at the Sheraton Old Town Hotel.
Wisconsin	Milwaukee, Menomonee Falls	August 20	Addressed the Veterans of Foreign Wars Convention at the Midwest Express Center. Toured the Harley-Davidson Pilgrim Road Powertrain Operations facility.
Missouri	Independence, Kansas City	August 20–21	Visited Truman High School. Took questions from the public at a Target store on Madison Avenue in Kansas City.
Texas	Waco	August 23	Golfed at Ridgewood Country Club.
Pennsylvania	West Mifflin, South Williamsport	August 26	Toured the Mon Valley Works–Irvin Plant. Inducted into the Peter J. McGovern Little League Museum Hall of Excellence in an event at Howard J. Lamade Stadium.
Texas	San Antonio, Waco	August 29	Addressed the American Legion convention at the Henry B. González Convention Center. Spoke at the dedication of the Mission San José grist mill. The last use of SAM 27000 as Air Force One was to bring the President to Texas State Technical College – Waco on this day; the plane was later donated to the Ronald Reagan Presidential Library.

== September ==
State or country	Areas visited	Dates	Details
Wisconsin	Kaukauna, Green Bay	September 3	Observed Labor Day at the Northern Wisconsin Regional Council of Carpenters Training Center in Kaukauna. Spoke at Austin Straubel International Airport.
Michigan	Detroit	September 3	Observed Labor Day by attending a barbecue held by Teamsters Joint Council 43.
Ohio	Toledo	September 6	Traveled with Mexican president Vicente Fox; both presidents spoke at the University of Toledo's John F. Savage Hall.
Florida	Jacksonville, Longboat Key, Sarasota	September 10–11	Visited Justina Road Elementary School in Jacksonville on the afternoon of September 10, where a leadership forum was held. Stayed overnight at the Colony Beach and Tennis Resort on Longboat Key. Visited Emma E. Booker Elementary School in Sarasota the next morning, where he was informed of the September 11 attacks. Left before speaking at the school due to the attacks.
Louisiana	Bossier City	September 11	Stopped at Barksdale Air Force Base as a secure location during the September 11 attacks.
Nebraska	Omaha	September 11	Stopped at Offutt Air Force Base as a secure location during the September 11 attacks.
New York	New York	September 14	Visited the World Trade Center site in the wake of the attacks. Met with families of missing or deceased first responders at the Javits Convention Center.
Illinois	Chicago	September 27	Spoke about the Air Transportation Stabilization Board at O'Hare International Airport.

== October ==
State or country	Areas visited	Dates	Details
New York	New York	October 3	Spoke at Federal Hall National Memorial. Visited Hernando De Soto Elementary School, PS 130, in Little Italy. Met with Governor George Pataki, Mayor Rudy Giuliani, and firefighters of FDNY Engine Company 55.
Maryland	Emmitsburg	October 7	Spoke at the National Fallen Firefighters Memorial as 101 names of firefighters killed in the September 11 attacks were added to the memorial.
California	Sacramento, Fairfield	October 17	Spoke at the California Business Association Breakfast at the Sacramento Memorial Auditorium. Stopover at Travis Air Force Base before departing for China.
China	Shanghai	October 18–21	Attended APEC Summit Meeting.
Maryland	Glen Burnie	October 24	Toured the Dixie Printing and Packaging Corporation factory.
New York	New York	October 30	Threw out the first pitch for Game 3 of the 2001 World Series at Yankee Stadium.

== November ==
State or country	Areas visited	Dates	Details
Georgia	Atlanta	November 8	Toured the Centers for Disease Control and Prevention headquarters amid the 2001 anthrax attacks, and addressed the nation on the subject from the Georgia World Congress Center.
New York	New York	November 10–11	Attended the opening of the 56th United Nations General Assembly. Stayed at the Waldorf-Astoria Hotel. Attended a Veterans Day prayer breakfast at the Park Avenue Armory.
Kentucky	Fort Campbell	November 21	Met with troops on the day before Thanksgiving.

== December ==
State or country	Areas visited	Dates	Details
Pennsylvania	Philadelphia	December 1	Attended the Army–Navy Game at Veterans Stadium, where he participated in the opening coin toss.
Florida	Orlando	December 4	Spoke at the Operation Paycheck Center, an unemployment aid program of the state of Florida. Took questions at the Orange County Convention Center.
Virginia	Norfolk	December 7	Observed National Pearl Harbor Remembrance Day, the 60th anniversary of the attack on Pearl Harbor, on the deck of the USS Enterprise.
Maryland	New Windsor	December 8	Viewed the first shipment of America's Fund for Afghan Children relief packages at the Brethren Service Center.
South Carolina	Charleston	December 11	Spoke to troops at the McAlister Field House at The Citadel Military College.
