= NATO summit =

Summit meeting comprising heads of state and heads of government of NATO member countries

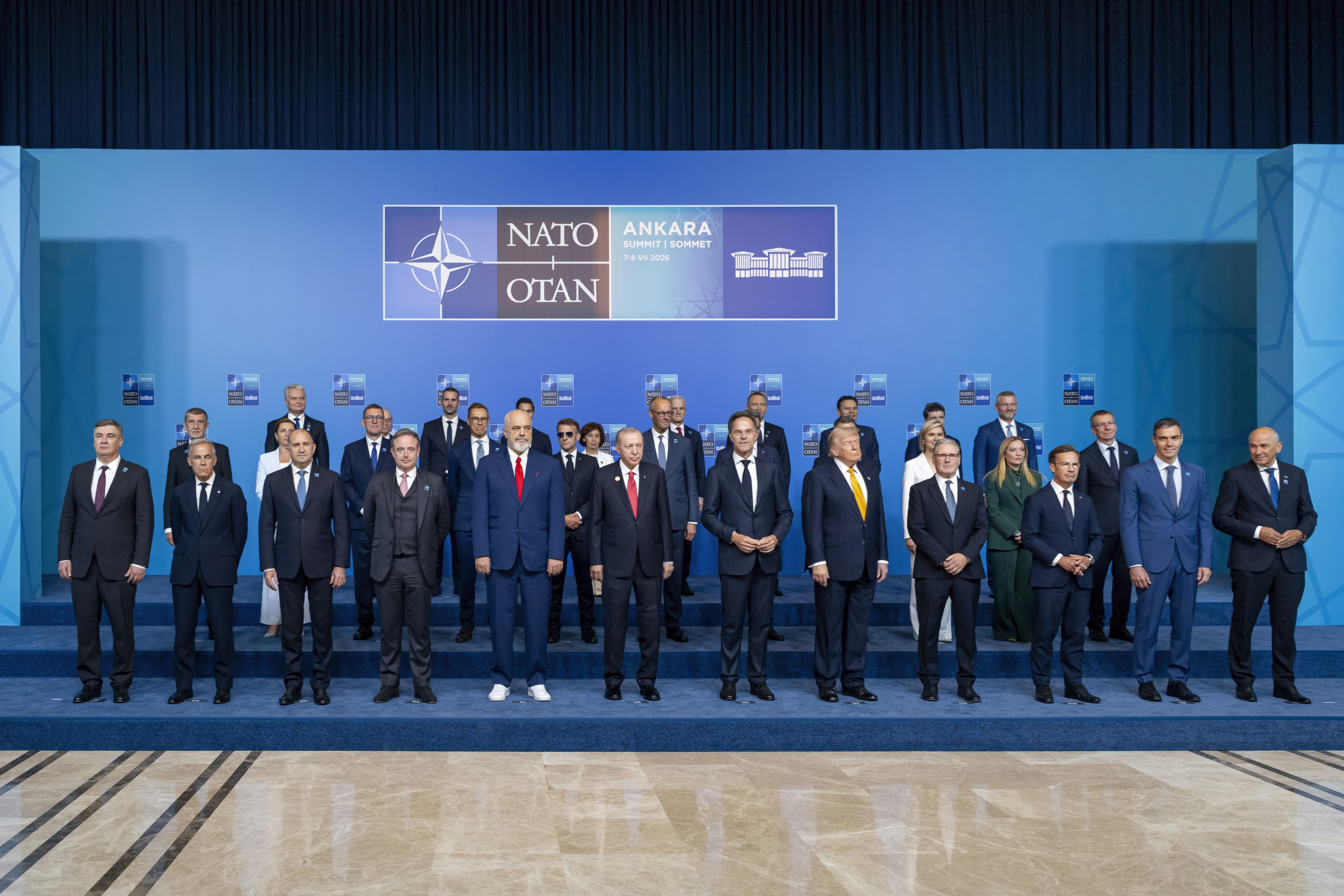
2026 Ankara summit of NATO, formal meeting of the heads of state and heads of government of the North Atlantic Treaty Organization.

A NATO summit is a summit meeting that is regarded as a periodic opportunity for heads of state and heads of government of NATO member countries to evaluate and provide strategic direction for Alliance activities.

NATO summits are not regular meetings like the more frequent NATO ministerial meetings, but rather are important junctures in the alliance's decision-making process on the highest level. Summits are often used to introduce new policy, invite new members into the alliance, launch major new initiatives, and build partnerships with non-NATO countries.

== Participating countries ==
Current NATO member states:

- Albania
- Belgium
- Bulgaria
- Canada
- Croatia
- Czech Republic
- Denmark
- Estonia
- Finland
- France
- Germany
- Greece
- Hungary
- Iceland
- Italy
- Latvia
- Lithuania
- Luxembourg
- Montenegro
- Netherlands
- North Macedonia
- Norway
- Poland
- Portugal
- Romania
- Slovakia
- Slovenia
- Spain
- Sweden
- Turkey
- United Kingdom
- United States

The non-NATO states and organisations currently participating:

- Armenia
- Australia
- Austria
- Azerbaijan
- Bosnia and Herzegovina
- Cyprus
- European Union
- Georgia
- Ireland
- Japan
- Jordan
- Malta
- Moldova
- New Zealand
- Philippines
- Singapore
- South Korea
- Switzerland
- Thailand
- Ukraine

== List of NATO summits ==
NATO summits
Year	Date	Country	City	Host leader
1957	16–19 December	France	Paris	President René Coty
1974	26 June	Belgium	Brussels	Prime Minister Leo Tindemans
1975	29–30 May	Belgium	Brussels	Prime Minister Leo Tindemans
1977	10–11 May	United Kingdom	London	Prime Minister James Callaghan
1978	30–31 May	United States	Washington, D.C.	President Jimmy Carter
1982	10 June	West Germany	Bonn	Chancellor Helmut Schmidt
1985	21 November	Belgium	Brussels	Prime Minister Wilfried Martens
1988	2–3 March	Belgium	Brussels	Prime Minister Wilfried Martens
1989	29–30 May	Belgium	Brussels	Prime Minister Wilfried Martens
1989	4 December	Belgium	Brussels	Prime Minister Wilfried Martens
1990	5–6 July	United Kingdom	London	Prime Minister Margaret Thatcher
1991	7–8 November	Italy	Rome	Prime Minister Giulio Andreotti
1994	10–11 January	Belgium	Brussels	Prime Minister Jean-Luc Dehaene
1997	27 May	France	Paris	President Jacques Chirac
1997	8–9 July	Spain	Madrid	Prime Minister José María Aznar
1999	23–25 April	United States	Washington, D.C.	President Bill Clinton
2002	21–22 November	Czech Republic	Prague	Prime Minister Vladimír Špidla
2004	28–29 June	Turkey	Istanbul	Prime Minister Recep Tayyip Erdoğan
2005	22 February	Belgium	Brussels	Prime Minister Guy Verhofstadt
2006	28–29 November	Latvia	Riga	Prime Minister Aigars Kalvītis
2008	2–4 April	Romania	Bucharest	President Traian Băsescu
2009	3–4 April	France; Germany	Strasbourg; Kehl	President Nicolas Sarkozy; Chancellor Angela Merkel
2010	19–20 November	Portugal	Lisbon	Prime Minister José Sócrates
2012	20–21 May	United States	Chicago	President Barack Obama
2014	4–5 September	United Kingdom	Newport and Cardiff	Prime Minister David Cameron
2016	8–9 July	Poland	Warsaw	President Andrzej Duda
2018	11–12 July	Belgium	Brussels	Secretary General Jens Stoltenberg
2021	14 June	Belgium	Brussels	Secretary General Jens Stoltenberg
2022	29–30 June	Spain	Madrid	Prime Minister Pedro Sánchez
2023	11–12 July	Lithuania	Vilnius	President Gitanas Nausėda
2024	9–11 July	United States	Washington, D.C.	President Joe Biden
2025	24–25 June	Netherlands	The Hague	Prime Minister Dick Schoof
2026	7–8 July	Turkey	Ankara	President Recep Tayyip Erdoğan
2027	TBD	Albania	Tirana	Prime Minister Edi Rama

=== Extraordinary summits and meetings ===
Year	Date	Country	City	Type	Context	Host leader
2001	13 June	Belgium	Brussels	Special meeting	Formalisation of "Membership Action Plans"	Secretary General George Robertson
2002	28 May	Italy	Rome	NATO–Russia summit	Upgrading of Russia–NATO relations to NATO–Russia Permanent Joint Council.	Prime Minister Silvio Berlusconi
2015	28 July	Belgium	Brussels	Special meeting	Activation of Article 4 by Turkey following the Suruç bombing.	Secretary General Jens Stoltenberg
2017	25 May	Belgium	Brussels			Prime Minister Charles Michel
2019	3–4 December	United Kingdom	Watford			Prime Minister Boris Johnson
2022	25 February	Virtual summit		Extraordinary summit	Activation of Article 4 by eight Eastern European states following the Russian invasion of Ukraine.	Secretary General Jens Stoltenberg
2022	24 March	Belgium	Brussels	Extraordinary summit	Russian invasion of Ukraine	Secretary General Jens Stoltenberg

== See also ==
- EU summit
- G7 summit
