= List of international trips made by Condoleezza Rice as United States Secretary of State =

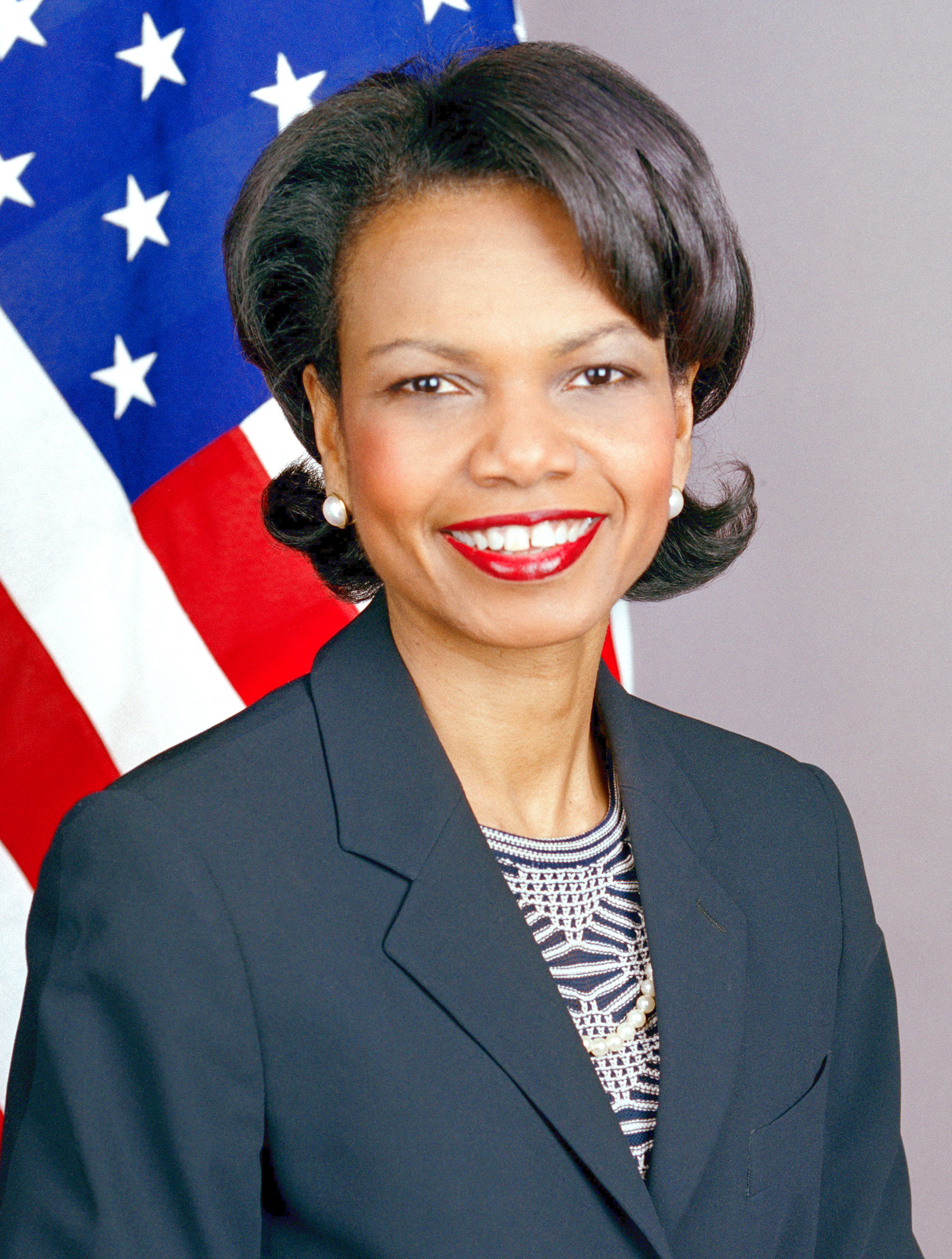
Official portrait of Condoleezza Rice as Secretary of State, 2005

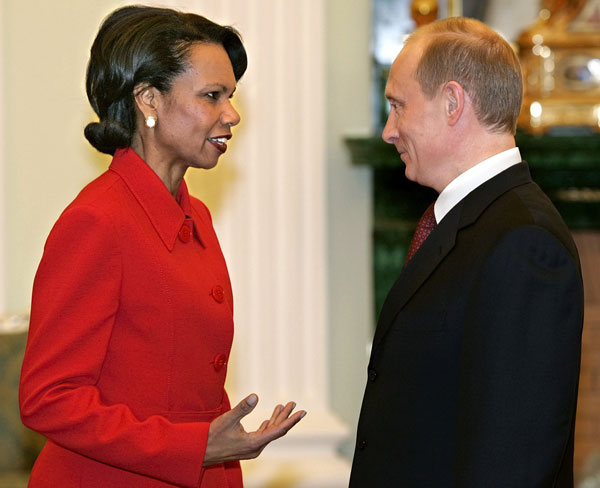
Secretary Rice with Russian President Vladimir Putin in the Kremlin, 2005

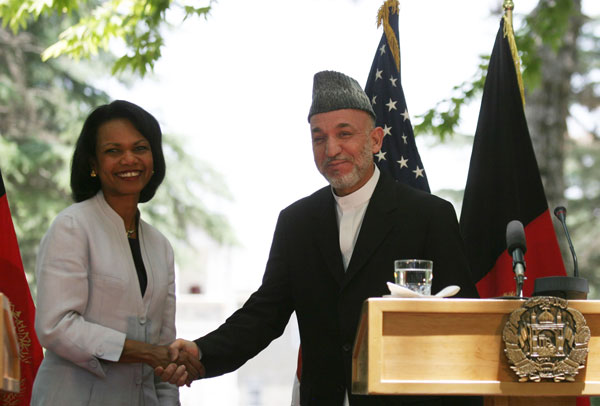
Secretary Rice with Afghan President Hamid Karzai in Kabul, 2006

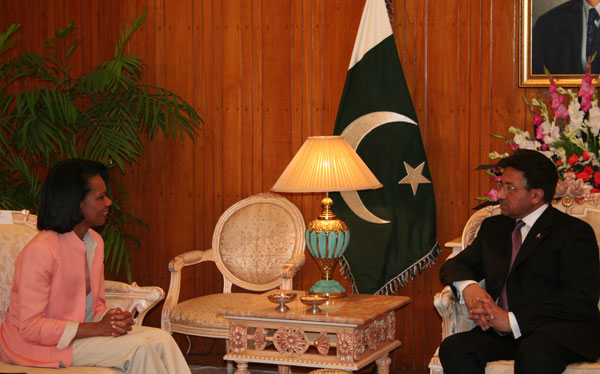
Secretary Rice with Pakistani President Pervez Musharraf in Islamabad, 2006

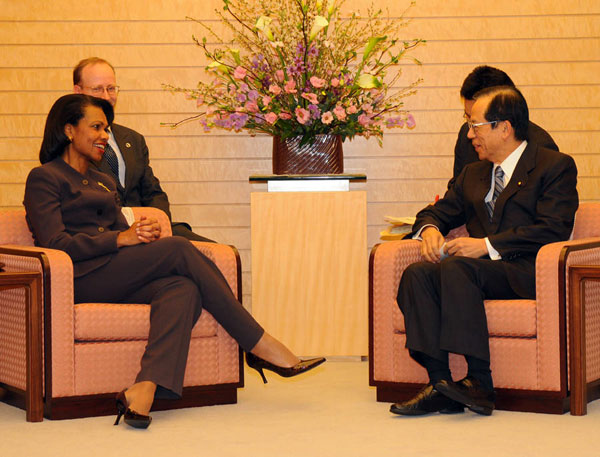
Secretary Rice with Japanese Prime Minister Yasuo Fukuda at the Kantei, 2008

This is a list of international visits undertaken by Condoleezza Rice (in office 2005–2009) while serving as the 66th United States secretary of state. The list includes both private travel and official state visits. The list includes only foreign travel which she made during her tenure in the position.

== Summary ==
The number of visits per country or territory where Secretary Rice traveled are:

- One visit to Algeria, Argentina, Bahamas, Benin, Croatia, Czech Republic, Denmark, El Salvador, Estonia, Ethiopia, Ghana, Greece, Guatemala, Haiti, Hungary, Iceland, Kenya, Kyrgyzstan, Libya, Lithuania, Luxembourg, Malaysia, Mongolia, Morocco, Netherlands, New Zealand, Norway, Peru, Rwanda, Samoa, Senegal, Singapore, Slovakia, Spain, Sudan, Sweden, Switzerland, Tajikistan, Tanzania, Thailand, Tunisia, Uruguay and Vietnam
- Two visits to Bulgaria, Indonesia, Ireland, Italy, Kazakhstan, Latvia, Liberia, Panama, Poland, Portugal, Romania, Ukraine and Vatican City
- Three visits to Australia, Austria, Bahrain, Canada, Chile, Colombia, Georgia, Mexico, Turkey and the United Arab Emirates
- Four visits to India, Kuwait and Lebanon
- Five visits to Afghanistan, Brazil, Japan and Pakistan
- Six visits to China, Jordan and South Korea
- Eight visits to Belgium and Saudi Arabia
- Nine visits to France
- Ten visits to Germany, Iraq and Russia
- Eleven visits to Egypt
- Thirteen visits to the United Kingdom
- Twenty-one visits to the Palestinian National Authority
- Twenty-five visits to Israel

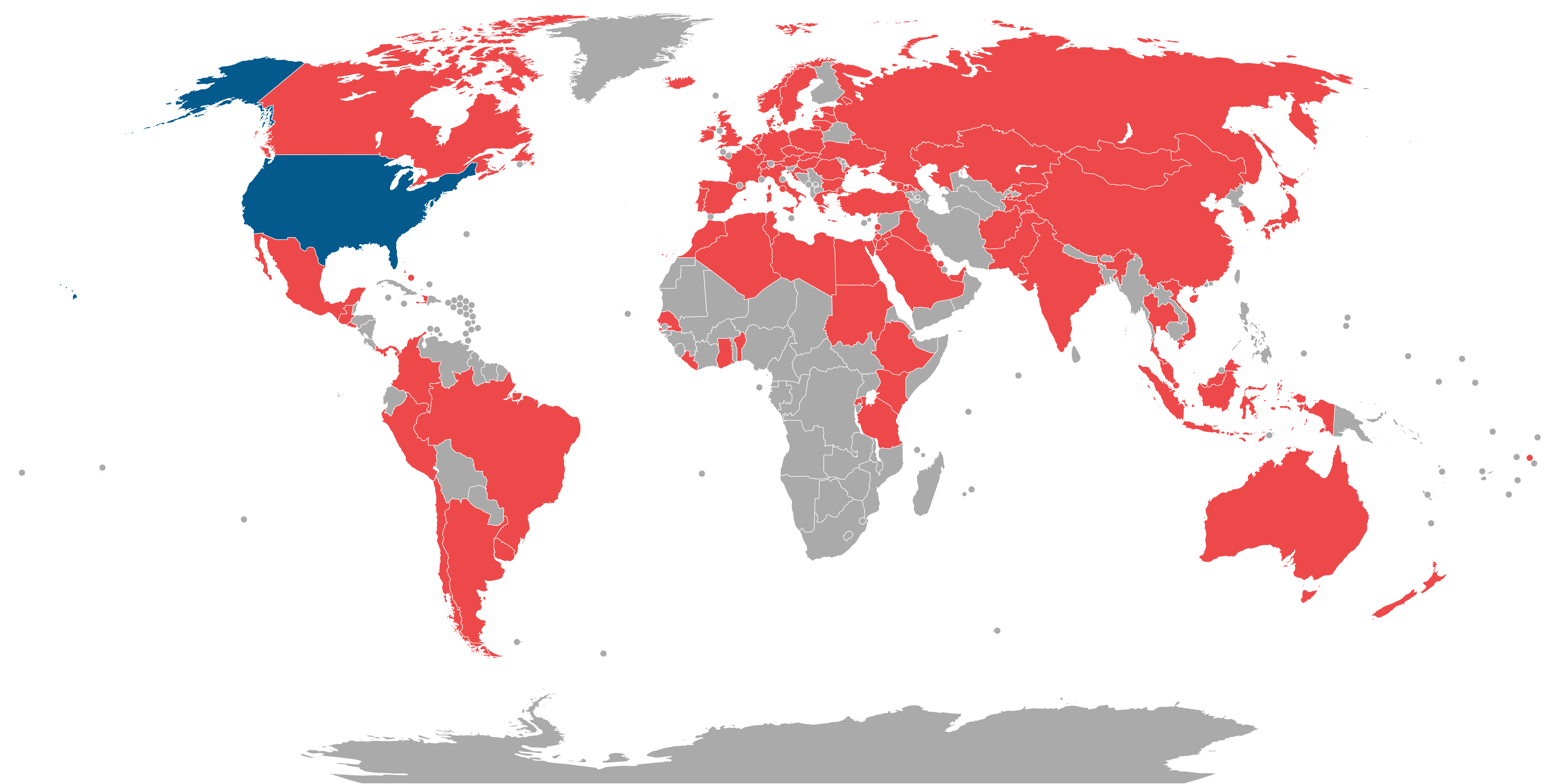
World map highlighting countries visited by Condoleezza Rice as Secretary of State, 2005–2009: United States Countries visited No visits

== Table ==
	Country	Locations	Details	Dates
1	United Kingdom	London	Met with Prime Minister Blair and Foreign Secretary Straw.	February 4, 2005
1	Germany	Berlin	Met with Chancellor Schröder.	February 4–5, 2005
1	Poland	Warsaw	Met with Prime Minister Belka and Foreign Minister Rotfeld.	February 5, 2005
1	Turkey	Ankara	Met with Foreign Minister Gül and Russian Foreign Minister Lavrov.	February 5–6, 2005
1	Israel	Jerusalem	Met with Prime Minister Sharon and Foreign Minister Shalom.	February 6–7, 2005
1	Palestinian National Authority	Ramallah	Met with Prime Minister Abbas.	February 7, 2005
1	Italy	Rome	Met with Foreign Minister Fini.	February 7–8, 2005
1	Vatican City State	Vatican City	Met with Cardinal Sodano.	February 8, 2005
1	France	Paris	Met with President Chirac and Foreign Minister Barnier; addressed the Institute of political sciences.	February 8–9, 2005
1	Belgium	Brussels	Attended a NATO Foreign Ministers' Meeting.	February 9, 2005
1	Luxemburg	Luxembourg	Met with senior EU officials.	February 9, 2005
2	Belgium	Brussels	Accompanied President Bush to the NATO and EU Summit Meetings.	February 20–23, 2005
2	Germany	Mainz, Wiesbaden	Accompanied President Bush to meeting with Chancellor Schröder.	February 23, 2005
2	Slovakia	Bratislava	Accompanied President Bush to meeting with Russian President Putin.	February 23–24, 2005
3	United Kingdom	London	Attended the London Meeting on Supporting the Palestinian Authority.	February 28 – March 1, 2005
4	Mexico	Mexico City	Met with senior Mexican officials.	March 10, 2005
5	India	New Delhi	Met with Foreign Minister Singh and senior Indian officials.	March 15–16, 2005
5	Pakistan	Islamabad	Met with President Musharraf and senior Pakistani officials.	March 16–18, 2005
5	Afghanistan	Kabul	Met with President Karzai and Afghan political leaders; addressed U.S. military personnel.	March 17, 2005
5	Japan	Tokyo	Met with Foreign Minister Machimura and senior Japanese officials.	March 18–19, 2005
5	South Korea	Seoul	Met with Foreign Minister Ban and addressed U.S. military personnel.	March 19–20, 2005
5	China	Beijing	Met with President Hu, Premier Wen, and senior Chinese officials.	March 20–21, 2005
7	Vatican City State	Vatican City	Attended the funeral of Pope John Paul II.	April 6–9, 2005
8	Russia	Moscow	Met with President Putin, Foreign Minister Lavrov, and senior Russian officials.	April 19–20, 2005
8	Lithuania	Vilnius	Attended a NATO Foreign Ministers' Meeting and meetings of the NATO–Russia Council and the NATO–Ukraine Commission.	April 20–21, 2005
9	Brazil	Brasília	Met with President da Silva and Foreign Minister Amorim.	April 26–27, 2005
9	Colombia	Bogotá	Met with President Uribe and Foreign Minister Barco.	April 27–28, 2005
9	Chile	Santiago de Chile	Attended the Communities of Democracies Ministerial Meeting.	April 28–29, 2005
9	El Salvador	San Salvador	Met with President Saca.	April 29, 2005
10	Latvia	Riga	Accompanied President Bush to meetings with the Presidents of the Baltic States.	May 6–7, 2005
10	Netherlands	Maastricht, Margraten	Accompanied President Bush.	May 7–8, 2005
10	Russia	Moscow	Accompanied President Bush.	May 8–9, 2005
10	Georgia	Tbilisi	Accompanied President Bush.	May 9–10, 2005
11	Kuwait	Camp Doha	Stopped en route to Iraq.	May 15, 2005
11	Iraq	Irbil, Baghdad	Met with Kurdish political leaders, and with U.S. and Iraqi officials.	May 15, 2005
12	Ireland	Shannon	Stopped while en route to the Middle East.	June 17, 2005
12	Israel	Jerusalem	Met with Prime Minister Sharon and senior Israeli officials.	June 17–19, 2005
12	Palestinian National Authority	Ramallah	Met with Prime Minister Abbas.	June 18, 2005
12	Jordan	Amman	Met with Foreign Minister Qasrawi.	June 19–20, 2005
12	Egypt	Sharm el-Sheikh, Cairo	Met with President Mubarak, Foreign Minister Aboul Ghait, and political leaders; gave a speech at the American University in Cairo.	June 20, 2005
12	Saudi Arabia	Riyadh	Met with Crown Prince Abdullah and senior Saudi officials.	June 20–21, 2005
12	Belgium	Brussels	Attended the International Conference on Iraq.	June 21–22, 2005
12	United Kingdom	London	Attended a meeting of G-8 Foreign Ministers.	June 22–23, 2005
13	China	Beijing	Met with President Hu, Foreign Minister Li and senior Chinese officials.	July 9–10, 2005
13	Thailand	Phuket, Ban Bang Sak	Met with Foreign Minister Suphamongkhon and Deputy Prime Minister Sathirathai and assessed tsunami relief aid.	July 10–11, 2005
13	Japan	Tokyo	Met with Foreign Minister Machimura.	July 11–12, 2005
13	South Korea	Seoul	Met with Foreign Minister Ban Ki-moon.	July 12–13, 2005
14	Senegal	Dakar	Attended the U.S.–Sub-Saharan Africa Trade and Economic Cooperation Forum.	July 19–20, 2005
14	Sudan	Khartum, Al-Fasher	Met with President al-Bashir and visited a refugee camp in Darfur.	July 20–21, 2005
14	Israel	Jerusalem	Met with Prime Minister Sharon and senior Israeli officials.	July 21–23, 2005
14	Lebanon	Beirut	Met with Prime Minister Seniora and Lebanese political leaders. Laid a wreath on the grave of former Prime Minister Hariri.	July 22, 2005
14	Palestinian National Authority	Ramallah	Met with Prime Minister Abbas and Palestinian officials.	July 23, 2005
15	Haiti	Port-au-Prince	Met with Interim President Alexandre and Interim Prime Minister Latortue.	September 27, 2005
16	Ireland	Shannon	Stopped en route to Central Asia.	October 10, 2005
16	Kyrgyzstan	Bishkek	Met with President Bakiyev, addressed coalition military personnel, signed agreement concerning access to the Manas airfield.	October 11–12, 2005
16	Afghanistan	Kabul	Met with President Karzai.	October 12, 2005
16	Pakistan	Islamabad	Met with President Musharraf and Prime Minister Aziz. Discussed disaster relief.	October 12, 2005
16	Kazakhstan	Astana	Met with President Nazarbayev and made a speech at Eurasian National University.	October 12–13, 2005
16	Tajikistan	Dushanbe	Met with President Rakhmanov.	October 13, 2005
16	France	Paris	Met with President Chirac and Foreign Minister Douste-Blazy.	October 13–14, 2005
16	Russia	Moscow	Met with President Putin and Foreign Minister Lavrov.	October 14–15, 2005
16	United Kingdom	London	Met with Prime Minister Blair and Foreign Secretary Straw.	October 15–16, 2005
17	Canada	Ottawa	Met with Prime Minister Martin and Foreign Minister Pettegrew.	October 24–25, 2005
18	Argentina	Mar del Plata	Accompanied President Bush to the Summit of the Americas.	November 3–5, 2005
18	Brazil	Brasília	Accompanied President Bush to a meeting with President Lula da Silva.	November 5–6, 2005
17	Iraq	Mosul, Baghdad	Met with Prime Minister Jafari and with Iraqi political leaders.	November 11, 2005
17	Bahrain	Manama	Attended the Forum for the Future.	November 11–13, 2005
17	Saudi Arabia	Jeddah	Attended a Strategic Dialogue meeting and met with Foreign Minister Prince Saud.	November 12–13, 2005
17	Israel	Jerusalem	Attended the Saban Forum meeting and a memorial service for the late Prime Minister Rabin; took part in negotiating a border crossing agreement with the Palestinian Authority.	November 13–15, 2005
17	Jordan	Amman	Met with King Abdullah II and visited the site of a terrorist bombing.	November 14, 2005
17	Palestinian National Authority	Ramallah	Met with President Abbas and negotiated a border crossing agreement with Israel.	November 14, 2005
18	South Korea	Busan	Attended APEC Ministerial and Summit meetings.	November 16–19, 2005
18	China	Beijing	Accompanied President Bush.	November 19–21, 2005
18	Mongolia	Ulaanbaatar	Accompanied President Bush.	November 21, 2005
19	Germany	Berlin	Met with Chancellor Merkel.	December 5–6, 2005
19	Romania	Bucharest	Met with President Băsescu and signed a military base access agreement.	December 6, 2005
19	Ukraine	Kyiv	Met with President Yushchenko and addressed students at Shevchenko University.	December 6–7, 2005
19	Belgium	Brussels	Attended NATO Ministerial Meeting and meetings of the European–Atlantic Council and the NATO–Ukraine Commission.	December 7–9, 2005
20	Liberia	Monrovia	Attended the inauguration of President Johnson-Sirleaf.	January 16, 2006
21	France	Paris	Headed the U.S. delegation to the International Conference for Support to Lebanon.	January 24–25, 2006
22	United Kingdom	London	Attended a Middle East Quartet Foreign Ministers' meeting and the London Conference on Afghanistan.	January 30 – February 1, 2006
23	Egypt	Cairo	Met with Foreign Minister Aboul Gheit, President Mubarak and Egyptian dissidents.	February 21–22, 2006
23	Saudi Arabia	Riyadh	Met with King Abdullah and Foreign Minister Prince Saud.	February 22–23, 2006
23	Lebanon	Beirut	Met with Prime Minister Siniora and Lebanese political leaders.	February 23, 2006
23	United Arab Emirates	Abu Dhabi	Met with senior officials and the Gulf Cooperation Council Foreign Ministers.	February 23–24, 2006
24	Afghanistan	Bagram, Kabul	Accompanied President Bush.	March 1, 2006
24	India	New Delhi	Accompanied President Bush.	March 1–3, 2006
24	Pakistan	Islamabad	Accompanied President Bush.	March 3–4, 2006
25	Chile	Valparaíso, Santiago, Viña del Mar	Attended the inauguration of President Bachelet.	March 10–12, 2006
25	Brazil	Rio de Janeiro	Stopped en route to Indonesia.	March 12, 2006
25	Indonesia	Jakarta	Met with President Yudhoyono and Foreign Minister Wirajuda. Addressed Indonesia Council on World Affairs.	March 13–15, 2006
25	Australia	Sydney, Melbourne	Met with Foreign Minister Downer and held Trilateral Strategic Dialogue with Australia and Japan.	March 15–18, 2006
26	Bahamas	Nassau	Attended CARICOM Foreign Ministers' Meeting.	March 21–22, 2006
27	Germany	Berlin	Met with Chancellor Merkel and with the Foreign Ministers of the Permanent members of the UN Security Council.	March 29–31, 2006
27	France	Paris	Met with President Chirac.	March 31, 2006
27	United Kingdom	Blackburn, Liverpool	Met with British Foreign Secretary Straw and gave several public addresses.	March 31 – April 2, 2006
27	Iraq	Baghdad	Travelled with British Foreign Secretary Straw and met with Iraqi political leaders.	April 2–3, 2006
28	Greece	Athens	Met with Foreign Minister Bakoyannis.	April 25, 2006
28	Turkey	Ankara	Met with Foreign Minister Gül.	April 25–26, 2006
28	Iraq	Baghdad	Met with Prime Minister-designate al-Maliki and with Iraqi political leaders.	April 26–27, 2006
28	Bulgaria	Sofia	Attended NATO Ministerial Meeting and signed Defense Cooperation Agreement.	April 27–28, 2006
29	Austria	Vienna	Discussed the Iranian nuclear crisis with the Foreign Ministers of the Permanent members of the UN Security Council and Germany.	May 31 – June 3, 2006
30	Austria	Vienna	Accompanied President Bush to the U.S.–EU Summit.	June 20–21, 2006
30	Hungary	Budapest	Accompanied President Bush.	June 21–22, 2006
31	United Kingdom	Prestwick	Stopped en route to Pakistan.	June 27, 2006
31	Pakistan	Islamabad	Met with President Musharraf and Foreign Minister Kasuri	June 27–28, 2006
31	Afghanistan	Kabul	Met with President Karzai.	June 28, 2006
31	Russia	Moscow	Attended a G-8 Foreign Ministers' Meeting.	June 29–30, 2006
32	France	Paris	Attended a P5+1 ministerial meeting.	July 12, 2006
32	Germany	Stralsund, Trinwillershagen	Accompanied President Bush to meetings with Chancellor Merkel.	July 12–14, 2006
32	Russia	Saint Petersburg	Attended the G-8 Economic Summit.	July 14–17, 2006
33	Lebanon	Beirut	Met with Lebanese political leaders.	July 24, 2006
33	Israel	Jerusalem	Met with Prime Minister Olmert and Foreign Minister Livni.	July 24–25, 2006
33	Palestinian National Authority	Ramallah	Met with President Abbas.	July 25, 2006
33	Italy	Rome	Attended a meeting of the Lebanon Core Group.	July 25–26, 2006
33	Malaysia	Kuala Lumpur	Attended ASEAN Foreign Ministers and Regional Forum Meetings.	July 26–29, 2006
33	Israel	Jerusalem	Met with senior Israeli officials.	July 29–31, 2006
34	Canada	Halifax, Stellarton	Commemorated 9/11/01 and met with Foreign Minister MacKay.	September 11–12, 2006
35	Saudi Arabia	Jeddah	Met with King Abdullah and Foreign Minister Prince Saud.	October 2–3, 2006
35	Egypt	Cairo	Met with President Mubarak and the Foreign Ministers of Egypt, Jordan, and the Gulf Cooperation Council.	October 3–4, 2006
35	Israel	Jerusalem	Met with Prime Minister Olmert and Foreign Minister Livni.	October 4–5, 2006
35	Palestinian National Authority	Ramallah	Met with President Abbas.	October 4, 2006
35	Iraq	Baghdad, Irbil	Met with Prime Minister al-Maliki and with Kurdistan Region President Barzani.	October 5–6, 2006
35	United Kingdom	London	Attended a P5+1 Foreign Ministers' meeting.	October 6, 2006
36	Japan	Tokyo	Met with Prime Minister Abe and Foreign Minister Asō.	October 18–19, 2006
36	South Korea	Seoul	Met with President Roh and Foreign Minister Ban.	October 19–20, 2006
36	China	Beijing	Met with Foreign Minister Li.	October 20–21, 2006
36	Russia	Moscow	Met with President Putin and Foreign Minister Lavrov.	October 21–22, 2006
37	Vietnam	Hanoi, Ho Chi Minh City	Attended the APEC Cooperation Forum Ministerial Meeting and accompanied President Bush.	November 15–20, 2006
37	Indonesia	Bogor	Accompanied President Bush.	November 20, 2006
38	Estonia	Tallinn	Accompanied President Bush.	November 28, 2006
38	Latvia	Riga	Attended NATO Summit meeting.	November 28–29, 2006
38	Jordan	Dead Sea	Accompanied President Bush to meetings with King Abdullah II and Iraqi Prime Minister al-Maliki. Attended Forum for the Future.	November 29–30, 2006
38	Palestinian National Authority	Jericho	Met with President Abbas.	November 30, 2006
38	Israel	Jerusalem	Met with Prime Minister Olmert and Foreign Minister Livni.	November 30, 2006
39	Israel	Jerusalem	Met with Foreign Minister Livni and Defense Minister Peretz.	January 13–14, 2007
39	Palestinian National Authority	Ramallah	Met with President Abbas.	January 14, 2007
39	Jordan	Amman	Met with King Abdullah II.	January 14, 2007
39	Israel	Jerusalem	Met with Prime Minister Olmert.	January 14–15, 2007
39	Egypt	Luxor	Met with President Mubarak and Foreign Minister Aboul Gheit. Proposed an Israeli–Palestinian summit meeting.	January 15, 2007
39	Saudi Arabia	Riyadh	Met with King Abdullah and Foreign Minister Prince Saud.	January 15–16, 2007
39	Kuwait	Kuwait City	Met with the Foreign Ministers of Egypt, Jordan, and the Gulf Cooperation Council.	January 16–17, 2007
39	Germany	Berlin	Met with Foreign Minister Steinmeir and Chancellor Merkel.	January 17–18, 2007
39	United Kingdom	London	Met with Prime Minister Blair.	January 18–19, 2007
40	Iraq	Baghdad	Met with Prime Minister al-Maliki and addressed U.S. Mission personnel.	February 17, 2007
40	Israel	Jerusalem	Met with Prime Minister Olmert and Foreign Minister Livni. Met with Prime Minister Olmert and Palestinian President Abbas on February 19.	February 17–20, 2007
40	Palestinian National Authority	Ramallah	Met with President Abbas	February 18, 2007
40	Germany	Berlin	Attended a Quartet meeting and met with Foreign Minister Steinmeier and Chancellor Merkel.	February 20–21, 2007
41	Canada	Ottawa	Attended Security and Prosperity Partnership of North America Meeting.	February 23, 2007
42	Brazil	São Paulo	Accompanied President Bush. Signed memorandum of understanding on biofuels cooperation.	March 8–9, 2007
42	Uruguay	Montevideo, Colonia del Sacramento	Accompanied President Bush.	March 9–11, 2007
42	Colombia	Bogotá	Accompanied President Bush.	March 11, 2007
42	Guatemala	Guatemala City	Accompanied President Bush.	March 11–12, 2007
42	Mexico	Mérida	Accompanied President Bush.	March 12–13, 2007
43	Egypt	Aswan	Met with President Mubarak and with the Arab Quartet Foreign Ministers.	March 24–25, 2007
43	Israel	Jerusalem	Met with Prime Minister Olmert and Foreign Minister Livni.	March 25–27, 2007
43	Palestinian National Authority	Ramallah	Met with President Abbas.	March 25, 2007
43	Jordan	Amman	Met with King Abdullah II.	March 26, 2007
44	Norway	Oslo	Attended NATO Foreign Ministers' and NATO–Russia Council Meetings.	April 25–26, 2007
45	Egypt	Sharm el-Sheikh	Attended the International Compact with Iraq meeting. Met with Syrian Foreign Minister al-Moualem.	May 1–4, 2007
46	Russia	Moscow	Met with President Putin and Foreign Minister Lavrov.	May 14–15, 2007
47	Germany	Potsdam	Attended a G-8 Foreign Ministers' Meeting.	May 30–31, 2007
47	Austria	Vienna	Attended the Women's Empowerment Strategy Group and the Roundtable on Networking for Peace and Security in the Middle East.	May 31 – June 1, 2007
47	Spain	Madrid	Met with President Zapatero and Foreign Minister Moratinos.	June 1, 2007
48	Panama	Panama City	Attended OAS General Assembly Meeting.	June 4, 2007
49	France	Paris	Met with President Sarkozy, Foreign Minister Kouchner, and Lebanese Prime Minister Siniora. Attended a meeting of the International Contact Group on Sudan/Darfur.	June 24–26, 2007
50	Portugal	Lisbon	Attended a Quartet Principals' meeting.	July 19–20, 2007
51	Egypt	Sharm el-Sheikh	Met with the Foreign Ministers of Egypt, Jordan, Saudi Arabia, and the Gulf Cooperation Council and with President Mubarak.	July 31 – August 1, 2007
51	Saudi Arabia	Jeddah	Met with King Abdullah and Foreign Minister Saud.	August 1, 2007
51	Israel	Jerusalem	Met with President Peres and Foreign Minister Livni.	August 1–2, 2007
51	Palestinian National Authority	Ramallah	Met with President Abbas.	August 2, 2007
52	Australia	Sydney	Accompanied President Bush to the APEC leaders' meeting.	September 4–7, 2007
53	Israel	Jerusalem	Met with President Peres, Prime Minister Olmert, and Foreign Minister Livni.	September 19–20, 2007
53	Palestinian National Authority	Ramallah	Discussed prospects for an Israel–Palestinian peace conference with President Abbas.	September 20, 2007
54	Russia	Moscow	Attended 2+2 Meeting on strategic security issues.	October 12–14, 2007
54	Israel	Jerusalem	Met with Prime Minister Olmert. Also met with religious leaders.	October 14–15, 2007
54	Palestinian National Authority	Ramallah	Met with President Abbas.	October 15, 2007
54	Egypt	Cairo	Met with President Mubarak and Foreign Minister Aboul Gheit.	October 16, 2007
54	Palestinian National Authority	Bethlehem, Ramallah	Visited the Church of the Nativity and met with civil leaders. Met with President Abbas.	October 17, 2007
54	Israel	Jerusalem	Met with Foreign Minister Livni.	October 17–18, 2007
54	United Kingdom	London	Met with King Abdullah II of Jordan.	October 18, 2007
55	Turkey	Ankara, Istanbul	Met with President Gül, Prime Minister Erdoğan, and Foreign Minister Babacan. Attended an expanded ministerial meeting of countries adjoining Iraq in Istanbul.	November 2–3, 2007
55	Israel	Tel Aviv, Jerusalem	Discussed proposed Middle East peace conference with Prime Minister Olmert and Foreign Minister Livni. Addressed the Saban Forum.	November 3–5, 2007
55	Palestinian National Authority	Ramallah	Discussed proposed Middle East peace conference with President Abbas.	November 5, 2007
55	Ethiopia	Addis Abeba	Met with leaders of the African Great Lakes States and discussed the situation in Somalia and the Sudan with representatives of the African Union and the UN.	December 5–6, 2007
55	Belgium	Brussels	Attended NATO Ministerial meeting, and meetings of the NATO–Russia Council and the NATO–Ukraine Commission.	December 6–7, 2007
56	France	Paris	Attended a Quartet meeting and the Palestinian Donors' Conference. Met with President Sarkozy.	December 16–18, 2007
56	Iraq	Kirkuk, Baghdad	Met with members of a civil-military reconstruction team and local politicians in Kirkuk and with the UN Special Representative and with Iraqi political leaders in Baghdad.	December 18, 2007
57	Israel	Tel Aviv, Jerusalem	Accompanied President Bush.	January 9–11, 2008
57	Palestinian National Authority	Ramallah	Accompanied President Bush.	January 10, 2008
57	Kuwait	Kuwait City	Accompanied President Bush.	January 11–12, 2008
57	Bahrain	Manama	Accompanied President Bush.	January 12, 2008
57	United Arab Emirates	Abu Dhabi	Accompanied President Bush.	January 13, 2008
57	Saudi Arabia	Riyadh	Accompanied President Bush. Met with Foreign Minister Prince Saud.	January 14–15, 2008
57	Iraq	Baghdad	Met with Prime Minister al-Maliki and Foreign Minister Zebari.	January 15, 2008
58	Germany	Berlin	Attended a meeting of the P5 +1 Group on Iran.	January 22–23, 2008
58	Switzerland	Davos	Addressed the World Economic Forum and met with Foreign Minister Calmy-Rey.	January 23, 2008
58	Colombia	Medellín	Led a Congressional delegation to discuss a free-trade agreement and security issues.	January 24–25, 2008
59	United Kingdom	London	Met with Foreign Secretary Miliband.	February 6–7, 2008
59	Afghanistan	Kandahar, Kabul	Accompanied British Foreign Secretary Miliband. Met with President Karzai.	February 7, 2008
60	Benin	Porto-Novo	Accompanied President Bush.	February 16, 2008
60	Tanzania	Dar es Salaam	Accompanied President Bush.	February 16–19, 2008
60	Kenya	Nairobi	Met with President Kibaki, former Secretary-General Annan, and Kenyan political leaders.	February 18, 2008
60	Rwanda	Kigali	Accompanied President Bush.	February 19, 2008
60	Ghana	Accra	Accompanied President Bush.	February 19–21, 2008
60	Liberia	Monrovia	Accompanied President Bush.	February 21, 2008
61	South Korea	Seoul	Attended the inauguration of President Lee Myung-bak and discussed the Six-party talks and a proposed Free Trade Agreement.	February 24–26, 2008
61	China	Beijing	Met with President Hu and Foreign Minister Yang.	February 26, 2008
61	Japan	Tokyo	Met with Foreign Minister Kōmura and with Israeli Prime Minister Olmert.	February 26–27, 2008
62	Egypt	Cairo	Met with President Mubarak and Foreign Minister Aboul Gheit to discuss the Gaza crisis.	March 4, 2008
62	Palestinian National Authority	Ramallah	Met with President Abbas to discuss the Gaza crisis.	March 4, 2008
62	Israel	Jerusalem	Met with Prime Minister Olmert and Foreign Minister Livni to discuss the Gaza crisis.	March 4–5, 2008
62	Belgium	Brussels	Attended NATO and EU Ministerial Meetings. Addressed Women Leaders Working Group.	March 5–7, 2008
63	Brazil	Brasília, Salvador da Bahia	Met with President Lula da Silva and Foreign Minister Amorim. In Salvador da Bahia, met with the president of Neoenergia and with the state governor.	March 13–14, 2008
63	Chile	Santiago de Chile	Met with President Bachelet and Foreign Minister Foxley.	March 14–15, 2008
64	Russia	Moscow	Accompanied Secretary of Defense Gates and met with President Putin, President-elect Medvedev, Foreign Minister Lavrov, and Defense Minister Serdyukov.	March 17–19, 2008
65	Israel	Jerusalem	Met with Foreign Minister Livni and Defense Minister Barak and with Palestinian President Abbas and Prime Minister Fayyad.	March 29–30, 2008
65	Jordan	Amman	Met with Palestinian President Abbas and King Abdullah II.	March 30–31, 2008
65	Ukraine	Kyiv	Joined President Bush.	March 31, 2008
65	Romania	Bucharest	Attended NATO Summit Meeting.	April 1–4, 2008
65	Croatia	Zagreb	Accompanied President Bush.	April 4–5, 2008
65	Russia	Sochi	Accompanied President Bush.	April 5–6, 2008
66	Iraq	Baghdad	Met with U.S. Embassy and military personnel and with Iraqi political leaders.	April 20, 2008
66	Bahrain	Manama	Met with the Foreign Ministers of the Gulf Cooperation Council, Egypt, and Jordan.	April 20–22, 2008
66	Kuwait	Kuwait City	Attended an Expanded Neighbors of Iraq Ministerial meeting.	April 21–22, 2008
67	United Kingdom	London	Attended meetings of the Quartet, Ad Hoc Liaison Committee and the P5+1. Also discussed Kosovo with European Foreign Ministers. Met with Israeli Foreign Minister Livni and Palestinian Prime Minister Fayyad.	May 1–3, 2008
67	Israel	Jerusalem	Met with Prime Minister Olmert, Foreign Minister Livni, and other senior officials.	May 3–5, 2008
67	Palestinian National Authority	Ramallah	Met with President Abbas	May 4, 2008
68	Israel	Tel Aviv, Jerusalem	Accompanied President Bush.	May 14–16, 2008
68	Saudi Arabia	Riyadh	Accompanied President Bush.	May 16–17, 2008
68	Egypt	Sharm el-Sheikh	Accompanied President Bush.	May 17–18, 2008
69	Sweden	Stockholm	Attended Iraq Compact Conference.	May 28–30, 2008
69	Iceland	Reykjavík	Met with Foreign Minister Gísladóttir.	May 30, 2008
70	France	Paris	Attended the International Support Conference for Afghanistan.	June 11–14, 2008
70	Israel	Jerusalem	Met with Foreign Minister Livni and Prime Minister Olmert.	June 14–16, 2008
70	Palestinian National Authority	Ramallah	Met with President Abbas.	June 15, 2008
70	Lebanon	Beirut	Met with President Suleiman, Prime Minister-designate Siniora, and Lebanese political leaders.	June 16, 2008
71	Germany	Berlin	Attended the Conference in Support of Palestinian Civil Security and Rule of Law.	June 23–25, 2008
71	Japan	Kyoto	Attended the G-8 Ministerial Meeting and the Trilateral Strategic Dialogue with the Foreign Ministers of Australia and Japan.	June 26–28, 2008
71	South Korea	Seoul	Met with President Lee Myung-bak and Foreign Minister Yu Myung-hwan.	June 28–29, 2008
71	China	Chengdu, Beijing	Met with local officials and aid workers in Chengdu. Met with President Hu and senior officials.	June 29–30, 2008
72	Czech Republic	Prague	Signed missile defense radar agreement.	July 8–9, 2008
72	Bulgaria	Sofia	Received the Order of Stara Planina, First Class and met with Foreign Minister Kalfin.	July 9, 2008
72	Georgia	Tbilisi	Met with President Saakashvili.	July 9–10, 2008
73	United Arab Emirates	Abu Dhabi	Met with the Foreign Ministers of the Gulf Cooperation Council, Egypt, Jordan, and Iraq.	July 21–22, 2008
73	Singapore	Singapore	Attended the ASEAN Post–Ministerial Conference and Regional Forum.	July 22–24, 2008
73	Australia	Perth	Met with Foreign Minister Smith.	July 24–25, 2008
73	New Zealand	Auckland	Met with Prime Minister Clark, Foreign Minister Peters, and Opposition Leader Key.	July 25–27, 2008
73	Samoa	Apia	Met with representatives of the Pacific Islands Forum nations. (Crossed International Date Line.)	July 26, 2008
74	France	Paris, Toulon	Discussed EU peace plan for Russia and Georgia.	August 14–15, 2008
74	Georgia	Tbilisi	Met with President Saakashvili and Foreign Minister Tkeselashvili.	August 15, 2008
75	Belgium	Brussels	Attended an emergency meeting of the North Atlantic Council and discussed the Georgia crisis with EU leaders.	August 18–19, 2008
75	Poland	Warsaw	Signed a ballistic missile defense agreement.	August 19–21, 2008
75	Iraq	Baghdad	Discussed strategic framework agreement with Iraqi officials.	August 21, 2008
76	Israel	Jerusalem	Met with Prime Minister Olmert and Foreign Minister Livni.	August 25–26, 2008
76	Palestinian National Authority	Ramallah	Met with President Abbas.	August 26, 2008
77	Portugal	Lisbon	Met with Foreign Minister Amado.	September 4–5, 2008
77	Libya	Tripoli	Met with Head of State Gaddafi and Foreign Minister Shalgam.	September 5–6, 2008
77	Tunisia	Tunis	Met with President Ben Ali.	September 6, 2008
77	Algeria	Algiers	Met with President Bouteflika.	September 6, 2008
77	Morocco	Rabat	Met with Foreign Minister Fihri and other senior officials.	September 6–7, 2008
78	India	New Delhi	Met with Prime Minister Singh and External Affairs Minister Mukherjee.	October 4–5, 2008
78	Kazakhstan	Astana	Met with President Nazarbayev, Prime Minister Masimov, and Foreign Minister Tazhin.	October 5, 2008
79	Mexico	Puerto Vallarta	Met with Foreign Secretary Espinosa.	October 22–23, 2008
80	Israel	Tel Aviv, Jerusalem	Met with Foreign Minister Livni.	November 6–8, 2008
80	Palestinian National Authority	Ramallah, Jenin	Met with President Abbas and Foreign Minister Fayyad (November 7). Announced development aid program for Jenin (November 8).	November 7–8, 2008
80	Egypt	Sharm el-Sheikh	Attended a Quartet meeting.	November 8–9, 2008
81	Peru	Lima	Accompanied President Bush to the APEC Summit Meeting.	November 21–23, 2008
82	United Kingdom	London	Met with Foreign Secretary Miliband.	December 1–2, 2008
82	Belgium	Brussels	Attended a NATO Foreign Ministers' Meeting.	December 2, 2008
82	India	New Delhi	Met with Prime Minister Singh and External Affairs Minister Mukherjee.	December 3–4, 2008
82	Pakistan	Islamabad	Met with President Zardari and senior officials.	December 4, 2008
82	Denmark	Copenhagen	Met with Prime Minister Rasmussen and Foreign Minister Møller.	December 4–5, 2008
83	Panama	Panama City	Met with President Torrijos and attended the first Pathways to Prosperity in the Americas Ministerial Meeting.	December 9–10, 2008
