= 2002 Prague NATO summit =

2002 NATO summit meeting in Prague, Czech Republic

Prague Summit
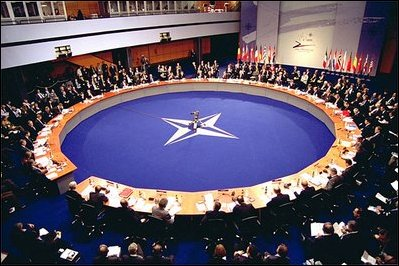
- 2002 NATO Summit
- Host country: Czech Republic
- Dates: 21–22 November 2002
- Venues: Prague Congress Centre
- Follows: 2002 Rome summit
- Precedes: 2004 Istanbul summit
- Website: www.nato.int

The 2002 Prague summit was the NATO summit held at the Prague Congress Centre where the heads of state and government of the NATO member states met. Seven states at the summit were invited there to begin accession talks with NATO: Bulgaria, Estonia, Latvia, Lithuania, Romania, Slovakia and Slovenia. NATO's post-Cold War Open Door Policy was also reaffirmed at the meeting. A NATO Response Force was considered and planned, a force that was officially declared ready at the 2006 Riga summit.

At a press conference, then-president of the United States George W. Bush declared that the US would "disarm" Saddam Hussein together with a "coalition of the willing".

== See also ==
- Individual Partnership Action Plan
