= 2002 Rome NATO–Russia summit =

2002 NATO summit meeting in Rome, Italy

Rome summit
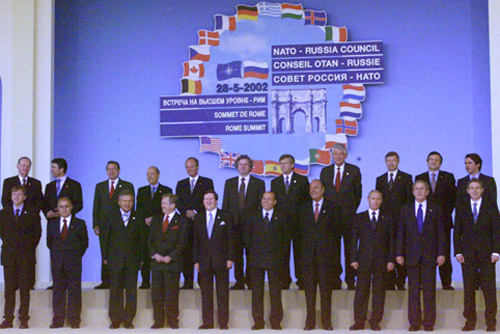
- 2002 Rome Summit
- Host country: Italy
- Dates: May 28, 2002
- Venues: Pratica di Mare Air Base

The 2002 Rome summit was an exceptional (and thus unnumbered) NATO summit of NATO and Russia at the level of Heads of State and Government. NATO Allies and the Russian Federation created the NATO-Russia Council (NRC), which replaced the NATO–Russia Permanent Joint Council (PJC), established in 1997 as part of the Founding Act of Mutual Relations, Cooperation, and Security.

The summit was held in the Pratica di Mare Air Base outside Rome because of outstanding security requirements soon after the 9/11 attacks.
