= 2005 Brussels NATO summit =

2005 NATO summit meeting in Brussels, Belgium

NATO Headquarters summit
- Host country: Belgium
- Dates: 22 February 2005

The 2005 NATO Headquarters summit was the 19th NATO summit held in the NATO Headquarters, Brussels, Belgium on 22 February 2005. During this summit, NATO leaders reaffirmed their support for building stability in the Balkans, Afghanistan and Iraq, and commit to strengthening the partnership between NATO and the European Union.
