= 2001 NATO special meeting =

2001 NATO summit meeting in Brussels, Belgium

NATO Headquarters summit
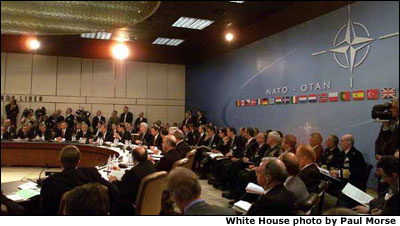
- 2001 NATO Headquarters summit
- Host country: Belgium
- Dates: June 13, 2001

The 2001 NATO Headquarters summit was a special meeting of the North Atlantic Council with the participation of Heads of State and Government on June 13, 2001.

The Heads of State and Government evaluated the success of the Membership Action Plan, which assists aspiring NATO members with their preparation for membership. NATO also expressed its hope and expectation, based on the anticipated progress by aspiring members, to launch the next round of enlargement at the 2002 Prague summit.
