= Cold War (1985–1991) =

Final phase of the Cold War

The time period from 1985 through 1991 marked the final years of the Cold War, which were characterized by systemic reform within the Soviet Union, the easing of geopolitical tensions between the Soviet-led bloc and the United States-led bloc, the collapse of the Soviet Union's influence in Eastern Europe, and the dissolution of the Soviet Union in 1991.

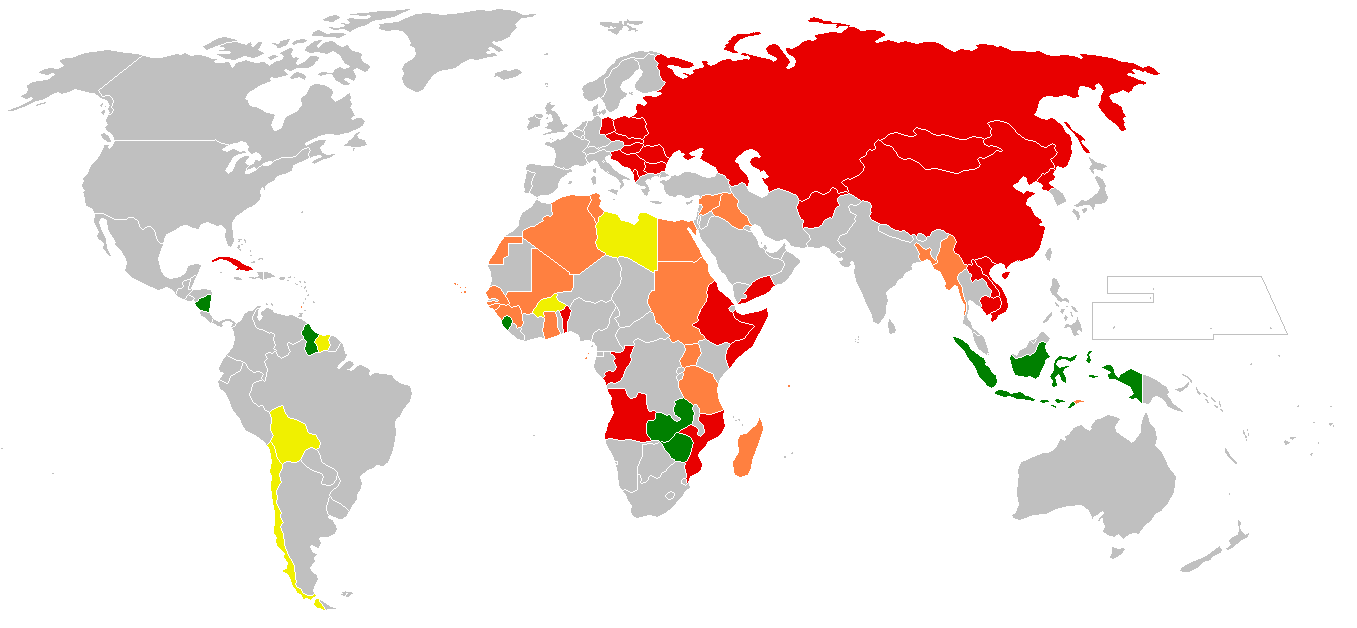
World map of Marxist Leninist, one party, military dictatorship, and other communist countries, in 1985

The beginning of this period is marked by the ascent of Mikhail Gorbachev to the position of General Secretary of the Communist Party of the Soviet Union. Seeking to bring an end to the economic stagnation associated with the Brezhnev Era, Gorbachev initiated economic reforms (perestroika), and political liberalization (glasnost). His rise coincided with a gradual thaw in relations with President Ronald Reagan's administration. Over four summit meetings between 1985 and 1988, the two leaders negotiated the Intermediate-Range Nuclear Forces Treaty, eliminating an entire class of nuclear weapons for the first time in the Cold War's history.

Popular revolutions swept Eastern Europe in 1989, toppling Communist governments in Poland, Hungary, Czechoslovakia, and Romania. The sentiment culminated in the fall of the Berlin Wall on 9 November, which, in turn, reopened the long-dormant question of German unity. Within a year—following negotiations—the once politically distinctive countries of West Germany and East Germany were reunified into a single nation state that became a member of NATO.

The Soviet Union itself did not survive the changes it had unleashed. Independence movements in the Baltic states and elsewhere gathered pace through 1990 and 1991, and a coup attempt by hardliners against Gorbachev in August 1991 accelerated rather than halted the union's disintegration that December. While the exact end date of the Cold War is debated among historians, it is generally agreed upon that the implementation of nuclear and conventional arms control agreements, the withdrawal of Soviet military forces from Afghanistan and Eastern Europe, and the resultant collapse of the Soviet Union marked the end of the Cold War. Scholars remain divided over the underlying causes, with materialist accounts emphasizing Soviet economic decline and ideational accounts stressing the personal worldviews of Gorbachev and Reagan coupled with the broader appeal of the Western European model.

== Thaw in relations ==
After the deaths of three successive elderly Soviet leaders since 1982, the Soviet Politburo elected Gorbachev Communist Party General Secretary in March 1985, marking the rise of a new generation of leadership. Under Gorbachev, relatively young reform-oriented technocrats, who had begun their careers in the heyday of "de-Stalinization" under reformist leader Nikita Khrushchev, (Note: For more on the earlier manifestations of De-Stalinization, see Tony Judt's Postwar: A History of Europe Since 1945) rapidly consolidated power, providing new momentum for political and economic liberalization, and the impetus for cultivating warmer relations via glasnost and trade with the West. Historian Sheila Fitzpatrick wrote that Gorbachev looked on these reforms "through the prism of the Thaw, as a revitalization of socialism rather than an abandonment of it."

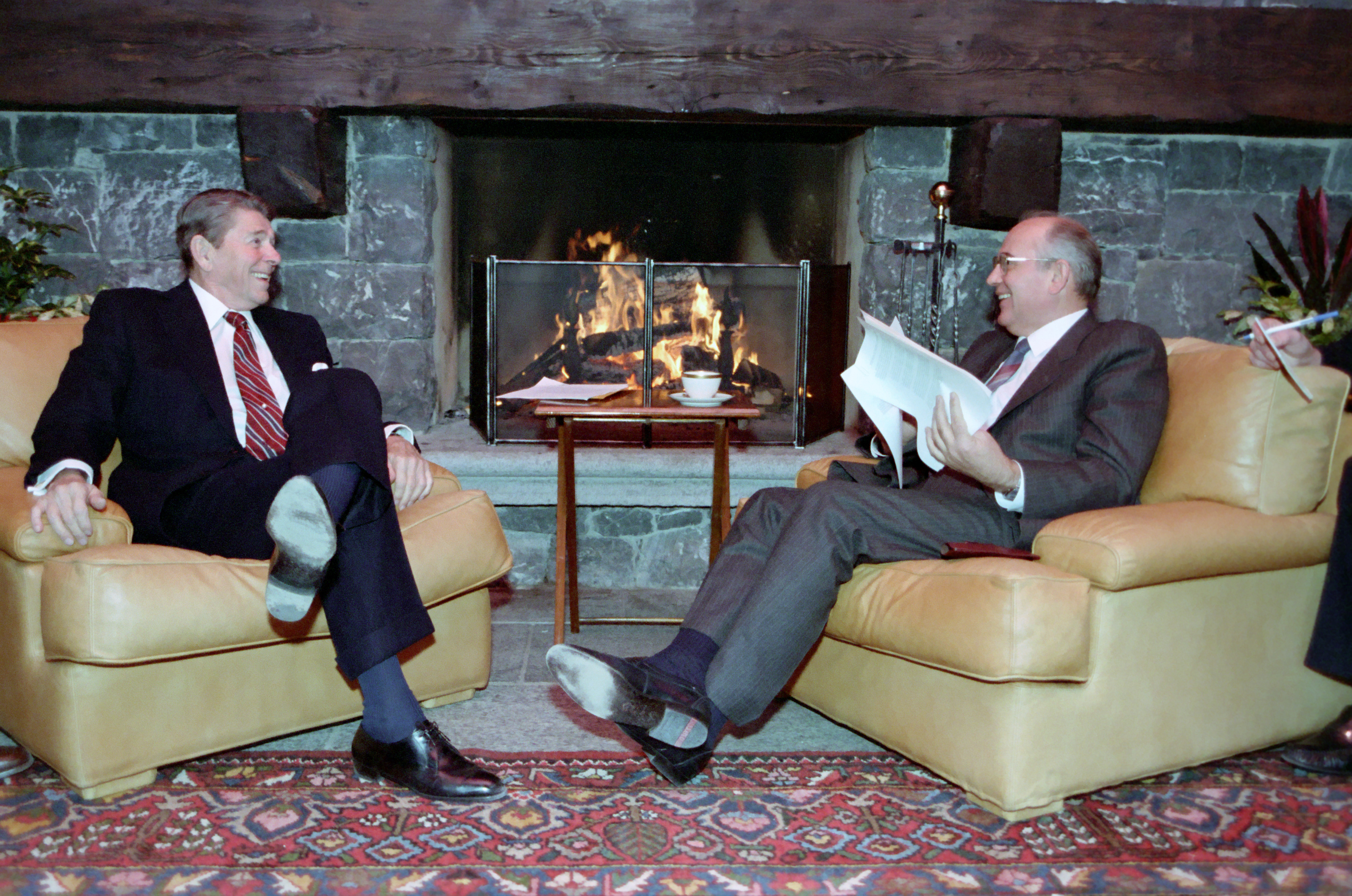
Reagan and Gorbachev during their first summit meeting in Geneva, 1985

On the Western front, President Reagan's administration had taken a hard line against the Soviet Union. Under the Reagan Doctrine, the Reagan administration began providing military support to anti-communist armed movements in Afghanistan, Angola, Nicaragua and elsewhere. Reagan had also ordered the implementation of the Strategic Defense Initiative (SDI) in 1983—a space-based interceptor program against nuclear missiles more commonly dubbed "Star Wars" by the media—an initiative that alarmed and "horrified the Soviets," who while doubting its feasibility, were in no position to compete technologically. By November 1985, the Soviets perceived SDI as both a military threat and as a potential means by which the United States might weaken NATO cohesion and alter the strategic balance in nuclear weapon technology. At the same time, officials in the Kremlin expressed concern that the deployment of space-based missile defenses would destabilize strategic parity and could make nuclear war more likely rather than less.

A major breakthrough came in 1985–87, with the successful negotiation of the Intermediate-Range Nuclear Forces Treaty (INF). This breakthrough became possible only after the Politburo agreed, on 28 February 1987, to decouple the treaty from Reagan's Strategic Defense Initiative—the very dispute that had derailed the Reykjavík talks the year before—clearing the way for an agreement in which the Soviet Union eliminated substantially more missiles than the United States, including the SS-23 "Oka," whose range Gorbachev conceded fell within treaty limits over his own military's objections. Historian Sergey Radchenko traces the decoupling decision to a memorandum Aleksandr Yakovlev sent Gorbachev on 25 February 1987, three days ahead of the Politburo's vote, arguing for separate INF negotiations independent of the broader Reykjavík framework. Radchenko situates the move within Gorbachev's wider preoccupation with projecting Soviet leadership through sustained peace diplomacy, reinforced by a growing conviction within his circle that SDI posed less a genuine military threat than a public-relations exercise. The INF Treaty of December 1987, signed by Reagan and Gorbachev, eliminated all nuclear and conventional missiles, as well as their launchers, with ranges of 500–1,000 kilometres (310–620 mi) (short-range) and 1,000–5,500 kilometres (620–3,420 mi) (intermediate-range). (Note: See for instance: Janne E. Nolan, "The INF Treaty: Eliminating Intermediate-Range Nuclear Missiles, 1987 to the Present," and Dan Caldwell, "From SALT to START: Limiting Strategic Nuclear Weapons," in Encyclopedia of Arms Control, pp. 955–965 and pp. 895–913.) Among the missile systems the INF Treaty intended to eliminate or scale-down were U.S. Pershing missiles and an array of American ground launched cruise missiles (GLCMs), while Soviet intermediate range systems included SS-4s, SS-12s, and SS-20s. The treaty did not cover sea-launched missiles, but it did include mutual on-site inspections by both nations to ensure compliance within a three-year period. By May 1991, after on-site investigations by both sides, 2,700 missiles had been destroyed.

The Reagan administration also persuaded the Saudi Arabian oil companies to increase oil production. This led to a drop in the price of oil, at a time when oil was the main source of Soviet export revenues. Following the USSR's previous large military buildup, President Reagan ordered an enormous peacetime defense buildup of the United States Armed Forces; the Soviets did not respond to this by building up their military because the military expenses, in combination with collectivized agriculture in the nation, and inefficient planned manufacturing, would cause a heavy burden for the Soviet economy. It was already stagnant and in a poor state prior to the tenure of Mikhail Gorbachev who, despite significant attempts at reform, was unable to revitalise the economy. Recognizing the unsustainable burden of military spending on the Soviet GDP, the growing costs of sustaining allied and satellite regimes, systemic barriers to technological innovation, and declining domestic living standards, Gorbachev pursued a program of radical economic modernization. The implications of these combined factors were vast, leading Gorbachev to begin changing the regime's political tone.

Economic failings in the Communist system were becoming more obvious across eastern Europe during the 1980s, as for instance, the yearly per capita GDP of East Germans was barely half that of those in West Germany. Infrastructure investments were also deficient in countries like Poland, Hungary, and Czechoslovakia, while at the same time, eastern bloc countries were losing their share of world trade. Meanwhile, countries throughout western Europe continued to prosper. (Note: Even more indicative of the differences, across the whole Soviet bloc, life expectancy trailed NATO Europe by approximately four years from 1980 to 1985.) By the mid-1980s, historian John W. Young observes, this contrast had become stark and rather than an integrated economic community at the technological frontier, Eastern Europe remained heavily indebted, inefficient, and unable to compete in world markets—a burden the Soviet economy itself had to help sustain through subsidized oil and raw materials.

In 1985, Reagan and Gorbachev held their first of four "summit" meetings, beginning in Geneva, Switzerland. After discussing policy, facts, etc., Reagan invited Gorbachev to go with him to a small house near the beach. The two leaders spoke in that house well over their time limit, but came out with the news that they had planned two more (soon three more) summits. The second summit took place the following year, in 1986 on October 11, in Reykjavík, Iceland. The meeting was held to pursue discussions about scaling back their intermediate-range ballistic missile arsenals in Europe. The talks came close to achieving an overall breakthrough on nuclear arms control, but ended in failure due to Reagan's proposed Strategic Defense Initiative and Gorbachev's proposed cancellation of it.

Like Reagan, British Prime Minister Margaret Thatcher also got along well with Gorbachev despite her pronounced anticommunism; she was subsequently encouraged by both his optimistic domestic reform agenda and his arms-control efforts through the mid-1980s.

Fundamental to the dissolution of the Soviet Union, the Gorbachev policy initiatives of "restructuring" (perestroika) and "openness" (glasnost) had broad ramifications. To this end, historian Sheila Fitzpatrick wrote of glasnost:

Everything the intelligentsia had ever hoped for in terms of freedom of expression and publication was suddenly available. Thanks to glasnost, the Soviet press was full of informed, detailed criticisms of historical ‘mistakes’ such as collectivization, the Great Purges, bad decisions in World War II, wartime ethnic deportations and postwar anti-Semitism. Newspapers and thick journals competed with each other for exposés, publishing all the manuscripts in drawers that had hitherto been forbidden and pushing for rehabilitation of fallen revolutionary heroes. It was a wonderful time to be a Soviet writer of a certain age and type—a Khrushchevian truth-teller whose realist novels and plays unmasked social ills, historical cover-ups and political scandals. It was an equally exciting time to be a Soviet reader, except that there was too much to read, and what one read was likely to shake one's faith in the Soviet system. Gorbachev's assumption, like that of the old reform-minded thick journals, was that 'telling the truth' could not but be good, ultimately strengthening the Soviet system by purifying it. Unfortunately, the opposite proved to be the case. The effect of the crash course on the flaws of Soviet socialism was to undermine the public’s confidence rather than rally it for reform.

Additionally, the internal political reforms associated with perestroika altered both the political consciousness of Soviet society and the strategic outlook of Soviet foreign policy. (Note: Warsaw Pact leaders across the Soviet orbit were unnerved by Gorbachev's policies, fearing such changes might lead to them being overthrown from power.) As the human-rights norms associated with the Conference on Security and Cooperation in Europe (CSCE) increasingly entered Soviet public discourse, elements within the Soviet leadership began to reassess the diplomatic significance of the CSCE process. This reassessment became visible during the negotiations of the Vienna Follow-up Meeting (1986–1989), where by 1988, the Soviet delegation demonstrated an increased willingness to compromise and relinquish several long-standing positions. The resulting agreements, which received unusually broad attention within Soviet society, illustrated how perestroika contributed to a transformation in Soviet perceptions of multilateral diplomacy and international human-rights norms.

Consequently, perestroika and glasnost had ripple effects throughout the orbit of the Soviet world, including eventually making it impossible to reassert central control over Warsaw Pact member states without resorting to military force. These ideological initiatives were accompanied by a significant reduction in military spending—which had once constituted 25 percent of the Soviet Union's GDP—as Gorbachev moved resources to improve the Soviet economy and help deal with domestic social challenges.

United States President Ronald Reagan delivers a speech at the Berlin Wall in June 1987, in which he called for Soviet General Secretary Mikhail Gorbachev to "Tear down this wall!". Famous passage begins at 11:10 into this video.

By 1986–1987, the Reagan administration increasingly employed public rhetorical challenges that emphasized human rights and political choice as tests of Soviet reform, during which the American president used a symbolic address to gauge the credibility of Gorbachev's agenda. The most overt example occurred when Reagan challenged Gorbachev on June 12, 1987 to go further with his reforms and democratization by tearing down the Berlin Wall. In a speech at the Brandenburg Gate next to the wall, Reagan stated:

General Secretary Gorbachev, if you seek peace, if you seek prosperity for the Soviet Union, Central and South-East Europe, if you seek liberalization, come here to this gate; Mr. Gorbachev, open this gate. Mr. Gorbachev, tear down this wall!

While aging Eastern European communist elites clung to "normalization," Mikhail Gorbachev exposed the stagnation at the heart of the Soviet Union's Communist Party. Assuming the post of General Secretary, he sought to reorder Soviet priorities in response to deepening structural decay: an economy largely unreformed since Stalin, paralyzed by central planning, and incapable of integrating the technological transformations reshaping the West. The result was a widening gap in living standards, particularly when contrasted against Western Europe and the United States. Facing declining revenues due to falling oil prices and rising expenditures related to the arms race and the command economy, the Soviet Union was forced during the 1980s to take on significant amounts of debt from the Western banking sector.

Environmental historian J. R. McNeill notes that the Soviet state's clumsy efforts to conceal the 1986 Chernobyl accident in Ukraine—itself partly a product of Cold War secrecy imperatives—mobilized public opinion against the authorities and catalyzed the broader environmental agitation that spread across the USSR in the era's final years, marking an early instance of civic activism operating openly under glasnost. The socio-political effects of the Chernobyl debacle simultaneously increased public support for Gorbachev's own reforms. This nascent activism was but one strand of a broader expansion of public expression that glasnost had unleashed across Soviet society. By the spring of 1989—in the wake of growing public disapproval of the Soviet–Afghan War—the USSR had not only experienced lively media debate, but had also held its first multi-candidate elections as liberalization spread from West to East.

== Collapse of communist Europe, 1989–1991 ==
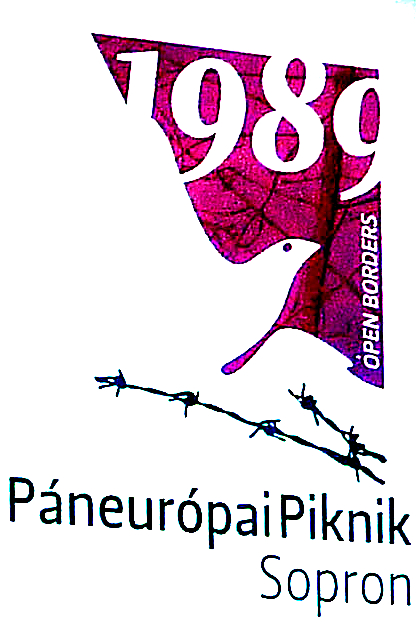
The Pan-European Picnic took place in August 1989 on the Hungarian-Austrian border.

In December 1988, Gorbachev announced to the United Nations that Soviet forces would be reduced by 500,000. This signaled something more consequential than disarmament; it appeared that the Kremlin was abandoning the Brezhnev Doctrine, the principle that it would use military force to keep its Warsaw Pact allies in line. With that guarantee withdrawn, popular democratic revolutions swept out of power every communist regime in Eastern Europe in remarkably short order, beginning in Poland in mid-1989 and ending with the violent overthrow of Nicolae Ceaușescu in Romania at year's end.

Gorbachev himself framed this abandonment less as retreat than as a moral reversal of roles. At the Malta summit of December 1989, he needled President George H. W. Bush over recent American intervention in Panama and the Philippines, observing that "some are beginning to say that the 'Bush doctrine' is replacing the 'Brezhnev doctrine'"—a jab pointed enough that Bush's flustered denial only confirmed to Gorbachev its applicability. For Gorbachev, it was not the Soviet Union that had been defeated but the Cold War itself, and with it any single power's claim to dictate how others should live.

=== Poland: the Catholic Church and Solidarity ===
Historian Tony Judt, among others, traced communism's collapse back to events in Poland as far back as 16 October 1978, when Karol Wojtyła—Archbishop of Kraków—became the first Polish pope in the church's history. Abandoning his predecessors' cautious Ostpolitik, John Paul II arrived in Warsaw the following June for the first of three pilgrimages to communist Poland, offering the Church not as a passive sanctuary but as an alternative pole of moral and social authority. Communist leaders, faced with the visible enthusiasm the pontiff’s presence elicited, had no viable response, since barring his return would only have deepened his appeal. When Pope John Paul II returned to Warsaw in June 1983 and told an uncomfortable General Wojciech Jaruzelski, on live television, that Poland "must take her proper place among the nations of Europe, between East and West," the Communist leadership could only stand and listen. As Stalin once observed, the Pope has no divisions—yet Wojtyła's visibility and timing emboldened activists who drew up a Charter of Workers' Rights that December, supplying the Polish trade union's eventual base of dissidents and workers with exactly the confidence that a state already teetering from its failed food-subsidy strategy could not counter.

As a result, Poland's blossoming grassroots Solidarity movement rapidly gained ground with strong popular bases that not only included organized labor, but spread through intellectual networks, and additionally garnered open support from the Catholic Church. Historian John Lewis Gaddis claims that Solidarity survived repression because it embodied a distinctive national identity that communist authorities were unable to suppress, while economic stagnation increasingly discredited the ruling party's ideology. In February 1989 the Polish People's Republic opened talks with opposition, known as the Polish Round Table Agreement, which allowed elections with participation of anti-Communist parties in June 1989. These negotiations legalized Solidarity and established the framework for partially free parliamentary elections,which facilitated sweeping victory for opposition candidates and effectively ended communist rule in Poland. (Note: Historian Jacques Lévesque explains that Solidarity's own leadership regarded the August 1989 breakthrough as provisional rather than settled, doubting its irreversibility until the Berlin Wall itself was opened weeks later.)

However, not every Communist regime showed the same restraint that year; a telling example stemmed from Chinese authorities, whose forces shot down hundreds of peaceful demonstrators in Tiananmen Square. Events in China provided a distinctive contrast, if not a vivid and grim demonstration of what the alternative looked like, to the conscious rejection of violence that shaped the East European revolutions.

=== Hungary and the Pan-European Picnic ===
Events in Poland were soon followed by developments in Hungary, where reformist leaders dismantled border controls with Austria during the summer of 1989. An opening of a border gate once part of the Iron Curtain between Austria and Hungary triggered a chain reaction, at the end of which the German Democratic Republic no longer existed and the Eastern Bloc had disintegrated—incentivized at least in part by the absence of Soviet intervention. The idea for the Pan-European Picnic came from Otto von Habsburg and was intended as a test of whether the Soviet Union would react when the iron curtain was opened. The Pan-European Union Austria then advertised with leaflets in Hungary to make East Germans aware of the possibility of escape. The result was the greatest mass exodus since the building of the Berlin Wall and the non-reaction of the Eastern bloc states showed the oppressed population that their governments had lost absolute power.

Subsequently, large numbers of East German refugees attempted to flee through Hungary and the weak reactions showed that the communist leaders lost even more power, which also contributed directly to the collapse of communist rule in East Germany. (Note: Also see: Thomas Roser: DDR-Massenflucht: Ein Picknick hebt die Welt aus den Angeln (German - Mass exodus of the GDR: A picnic clears the world) in: Die Presse 16 August 2018. More can be viewed in: „Der 19. August 1989 war ein Test für Gorbatschows“ (German - August 19, 1989 was a test for Gorbachev), or see: FAZ 19 August 2009. Miklós Németh in Interview, Austrian TV - ORF "Report", 25 June 2019.) By mid-1989 even Soviet officials openly joked that Eastern European states would now be allowed to proceed in their own way (like Sinatra), signaling the end of enforced ideological conformity within the bloc. Historian Jacques Lévesque framed these changes within a pattern he termed "negotiated revolutions," distinguishing the top-down transitions engineered in Poland and Hungary from the popular uprisings that followed in East Germany, Czechoslovakia, and Romania, which for audiences across the bloc, signaled that the Brezhnev Doctrine was truly dead.

=== Czechoslovakia, Romania, and the fall of the Berlin Wall ===
Elsewhere in Eastern Europe, communist regimes fell with varying degrees of violence. In Czechoslovakia and East Germany, mass demonstrations forced long-entrenched party leaderships from power, while in Romania the collapse of Nicolae Ceaușescu's regime occurred through a violent uprising in December 1989. Also in 1989 the Communist government in Hungary started organizing competitive elections. The Communist regimes in Bulgaria and Romania also crumbled, in the latter case as the result of a violent uprising among a host of additional socio-political ruptures in former Soviet-satellite states. Attitudes had changed enough that US Secretary of State James Baker suggested that the American government would not be opposed to Soviet intervention in Romania, on behalf of the opposition, to prevent bloodshed. The tidal wave of change culminated when the Berlin Wall (once the most powerful symbol of the Cold War) fell in November 1989, as millions watched. In many ways, the Berlin Wall's collapse symbolized the demise of European Communist governments and dramatically eroded the Iron Curtain divide of Europe. (Note: According to historian Jacques Lévesque, the Berlin Wall's collapse had directly precipitated Czechoslovakia's Velvet Revolution, when roughly a week afterward, a police crackdown on a student commemoration in Prague swelled into demonstrations that grew within days from 200,000 to as many as 750,000 participants, prompting Václav Havel to found the Civic Forum opposition coalition on 19 November.)

Historian Odd Arne Westad characterized the Berlin Wall's collapse as the pivotal breakthrough for what he termed "the miraculous year 1989," observing that although the Wall's fall guaranteed a transformation in relations between the two German states, the precise pace and extent of that transformation remained wholly unknowable to policymakers on either side of the former Iron Curtain at the time. Nonetheless, for Westad the Wall's demise carried significance well beyond the symbolic, since it reopened what had been, since the earliest years of the Cold War, an unresolved German question—one that the postwar division had sustained against the wishes of the German population itself—even as European leaders, Thatcher foremost among them, regarded the prospect of a reunified and economically formidable Germany with considerable unease.

=== German reunification ===
West German chancellor Helmut Kohl's proposal of a Ten Point Plan on 28 November 1989—a graduated progression from confederation to full federation—moved the German question from a mere platitude to actual politics almost overnight, and the storm of international criticism it provoked was the price of that shift. (Note: Margaret Thatcher privately told Gorbachev in September 1989 that Britain and Western Europe were "not interested in the unification of Germany." Similarly, during a meeting with Gorbachev in Kiev on 6 December 1989, Mitterrand offered a memorable statement of his own, claiming that Kohl was turning things "upside down.") Gorbachev's opposition, Thatcher's criticism, and French president François Mitterrand's vacillation notwithstanding, Kohl pushed for immediate unification once Dresden crowds took up chanting his name that December; unlike their more cautious political elites, ordinary people in the neighboring countries mostly favored German self-determination. This proposal presented a special dilemma for Gorbachev, since a "divided Germany" had been central to Soviet security strategy since the Stalin era. The resulting Two-Plus-Four negotiations—originally conceived by the U.S. State Department as a "four-plus-two" framework joining the wartime Allies with the two German states, then inverted to acknowledge German sensitivities—translated the East German electorate's March 1990 mandate into an accepted international settlement. In return, Kohl accepted the Oder–Neisse line as Germany's permanent eastern frontier in exchange for keeping reparations off the table, while American pressure and West German aid persuaded Gorbachev to permit a reunified Germany to remain in NATO.

Then U.S. Secretary of State James Baker assured Gorbachev on 9 February 1990 that NATO would not expand eastward. He told Gorbachev, "We understand the need for assurances to the countries in the East. If we maintain a presence in a Germany that is a part of NATO, there would be no extension of NATO's jurisdiction for forces of NATO one inch to the East." The following day, meeting Kohl in Moscow, Gorbachev voiced no fundamental objection to unification, provided Soviet concerns over borders, alliance structure, and the GDR's economic ties received due consideration; both German states, he observed, had absorbed the lessons of their shared history. Meanwhile, National Security Council staffer, Condoleezza Rice, plainly stated that the Soviets were in no position to resist German reunification. Reassurances from U.S. officials and Germany's financial aid payments sufficiently placated the Soviets at the time. The final settlement, worked out between Kohl and Gorbachev at Arkhyz in July 1990 and finalized that September, traded Soviet military withdrawal from East Germany for 12 billion deutschmarks plus an interest-free credit of another 3 billion—leading Deputy Secretary of Defense Robert Gates to remark that the Soviet Union had, quite literally, been "bribed out" of Europe. The concession provoked fury among Gorbachev's own advisers, such as Valentin Falin, who warned in a memorandum that NATO membership for a united Germany would "solidify the separation of European security" and give "impetus to NATO's advance to the Soviet Union's borders along the entire frontline." (Note: During the negotiations, West German Ostpolitik architect Egon Bahr told a Soviet official he never expected, "in the twilight of my life," to be more concerned for Soviet interests than the Soviets' own representatives were.)

=== Soviet disintegration ===
Political scientist Alex Pravda frames the Soviet collapse as unfolding in two acts: an initial phase, from 1989 to 1990, driven by smaller republics in the Baltic and Caucasus seeking sovereignty, followed by a second, from late 1990 through 1991, in which the defection of larger republics—Ukraine and, decisively, Russia under Boris Yeltsin—eroded the center's capacity to hold the union together. For Pravda, the USSR's demise was overwhelmingly domestic in origin, driven by ethnic nationalist movements that flourished under the liberalized conditions of perestroika and were seized upon by republican elites contesting a Kremlin weakened by economic crisis; the international dimension of the Cold War's end played, in his assessment, only a secondary role.

The collapse of the Eastern European governments with Gorbachev's tacit consent inadvertently encouraged several Soviet republics to seek greater independence from Moscow's rule. Agitation for independence in the Baltic states led to first Lithuania, and then Estonia and Latvia, declaring their independence. Disaffection in the other republics was met by promises of greater decentralization. More open ballots led to the election of candidates opposed to the Communist Party of the Soviet Union, but it also contributed to party fragmentation and presidentialism, which complicated democratic transition.

Washington's confidence in the Soviet Union's survival outlasted Moscow's own. Visiting Kiev on 1 August 1991, George Bush Sr. urged Ukrainians to remain within the Soviet Union, calling the choice between backing Gorbachev and backing independence movements a "false choice" and pledged to maintain "the strongest possible relationship" with Gorbachev's government. Ukrainians ignored him within months, voting overwhelmingly for independence that December—not, per Judt, from any sudden patriotic awakening, but because independence had become a matter of self-preservation rather than self-determination. The episode undercuts the self-congratulatory narrative that later entered the American public record; Washington did not bring communism down inasmuch as it simply watched it implode on its own schedule.

In an attempt to halt the rapid changes to the system, a group of Soviet hardliners represented by Vice President Gennady Yanayev launched a coup against Gorbachev in August 1991. Yeltsin's response did more to decide the coup's outcome than any single military calculation: emboldened by a personal meeting with Bush just three weeks earlier, he denounced the takeover as an illegal coup d'état from the Russian parliament building, directed the resistance from its steps, and conducted a running set of negotiations with world leaders before the assembled international press—all but one of whom withheld recognition from the plotters. The stand-off cost three demonstrators their lives in clashes with the army on the night of 20–21 August before the coup leaders, lacking the broad military backing they needed and rapidly losing the fear that had sustained their authority, lost their nerve; Estonia and Latvia seized the moment to declare independence, and coup leader Boris Pugo took his own life rather than face arrest. Gorbachev formally resumed his powers on returning to Moscow, but by then the substance of power had already passed elsewhere—the Communist Party did not even condemn its own plotters until 21 August, by which point Yeltsin had exploited its paralysis to ban the Party outright within the Russian federation. Yeltsin's courage in personally defending the parliament building may have helped break the putsch but at the cost of Gorbachev's remaining authority.

== End of the Cold War ==
After the end of the Revolutions of 1989, Gorbachev and President Bush Sr. met on the neutral island of Malta to discuss the events of the year, the withdrawal of the Soviet military from Eastern Europe, and the future course of their relationship. After their discussions, the two leaders publicly announced they would work together for German reunification, the normalization of relations, the resolution of Third World conflicts, and the promotion of peace and democracy (referred to by President Bush as a "New World Order").

Between the Malta Summit and the Dissolution of the Soviet Union, negotiations on several arms control pacts began, resulting in agreements such as START I and the Chemical Weapons Convention; the latter taking several years to fully implement. Additionally, the United States, still believing the Soviet Union would continue to exist in the long term, began to take steps to create a positive long-term relationship. This new relationship was demonstrated by the joint American-Soviet opposition to Iraq's invasion of Kuwait. The Soviet Union voted in the United Nations Security Council in favor of Resolution 678 authorizing the use of military force against its former Middle Eastern ally.

During the late 1980s, several long-running conflicts in the developing world that had been sustained by Cold War rivalry began to wind down, including wars in Cambodia, Angola, and Nicaragua. As relations between Washington and Moscow improved, both governments increasingly worked to restrain their respective regional allies—pressuring their former proxies to make peace with one another—and establish negotiated settlements instead, while the US concomitantly stressed market globalization. In southern Africa, Soviet and Cuban support for the Angolan government diminished as diplomacy advanced, while the United States reduced backing for anti-communist insurgents, enabling peace processes that culminated in the late 1980s. Overall, this détente which accompanied the final twilight of the Cold War would help bring about a relatively more peaceful international environment.

As a consequence of the Revolutions of 1989 and the adoption of a foreign policy based on non-interference by the Soviet Union, the Warsaw Pact rapidly lost its political and military rationale and began to dissolve. Meanwhile, troops stationed across eastern Europe began returning to the Soviet Union, completing their withdrawal by the mid-1990s. This marked the end of the Soviet military presence that had defined the political order in Europe since 1945.

For all the complexity and geopolitical strain that the great power competition of the Cold War brought onto Europe during the second half of the 20th century, its trajectory turned out to be both "more prosperous and peaceful for Europeans than the first," so quips German historian Konrad Jarausch. These social and economic realities do not, however, diminish the fact that the Cold War was a "multi-dimensional struggle" that left physical remnants across Europe, from "missile silos, tank tracks, command bunkers, and troop barracks" to the stockpiling of nuclear armaments capable of destroying the entire planet. Jarausch adds that:

Fortunately, the deadliness of the weapons proved therefore self-limiting and turned the Cold War into a peaceful competition between modernization alternatives. In Europe, the nuclear standoff stabilized frontiers, leading to a mutual recognition of spheres of influence that excluded the resort to arms in advancing social revolution or rolling back communism.

Reagan found the principles of mutually assured destruction morally contentious and personally repugnant, and in 1983 commissioned the SDI to shield the United States from nuclear attack; the program alarmed Soviet leaders, who recognized they could neither match the technology nor afford the investment required to answer it. While the U.S. military buildup increased the costs of confrontation, Reagan’s turn toward cooperation helped reduce superpower tensions. European leaders consistently pressed for arms reduction, but the decisive change came with Gorbachev's post-Brezhnev leadership. His reforms, withdrawal from Afghanistan, and vision of a "common European home" signaled a new global commitment to disarmament. The abandonment of the Brezhnev Doctrine then enabled reform within the Eastern bloc, empowered dissent and ultimately facilitated the Cold War's end. With its end, a more peaceful future awaited Europe and the world alike.

=== Post–Cold War foreign policy uncertainty in the United States ===
By the early 1990s, the United States had developed a complex global presence but lacked a shared framework for defining post–Cold War threats, interests, and priorities. Policymakers debated whether American leadership should emphasize restraint, engagement, or continued global activism, causing many to criticize the period's self-indulgence, attempts to reorganize the Islamic world, and the failure to integrate the former Soviet Union into NATO. The United States had established a complex global presence by the 1990s and policymakers felt that some structure to explain the "threats, interests and priories" that guide foreign policy was needed, but there was no agreement on how to proceed. Anthony Lake has said that attempts at doctrine-making during this period risked introducing "neo-know-nothing" isolationism or what he termed "irrational" ideas. The goal then of Bush Sr. and Clinton during their terms in office was to develop foreign policy objectives that would support consensus rather than accelerate fragmentation inside America's sphere of influence, ideological confrontation, or rigid doctrine building.

=== Causes ===
Scholars have pointed to materialist and ideational reasons for the end of the Cold War. Materialists emphasize Soviet economic difficulties (such as economic stagnation and sovereign debt), whereas ideationalists argue that the worldviews and personas of Gorbachev and Reagan mattered. Ideationalists point to a Gorbachev and Reagan's mutual desire to abolish nuclear weapons, as well as Gorbachev's perceptions of foreign policy. To this end, Gorbachev's re-conceptualization of security—emphasizing mutual restraint, political choice, and non-coercion—proved central to ending the Cold War.

Historian David Reynolds points out that the Soviet bloc's deepening technology gap was a structural cause in its own right. One materialist example Reynolds identified was the Soviet personal computer, the Agat, which during the mid-1980s remained an inferior copy of the outdated Apple II; meanwhile, Gorbachev's own informatizatsiia initiative aimed at just 1.3 million schoolroom computers by 1995, against the three million already in American classrooms by 1985 alone. Similar technological deficiencies plagued East Germany to the extent that historian Charles Maier characterized the late-1980s GDR economy as caught in "a race between computers and collapse." Concomitantly, additional ideational arguments—beyond the aforementioned influence of Gorbachev and Reagan—can be discerned from the example of Western Europe, where the decisive contribution lay less in diplomacy than in demonstration, according to historian John W. Young. By coupling a market economy with political democracy, welfare provision, and social justice, Western European states offered East Europeans a model that, after 1989, they actively sought to emulate by joining NATO and the European Union rather than pursuing an American or reformed-Communist alternative.

== Legacy ==
People living through the post–Cold War period witnessed rapid economic transformation and political integration in much of Central and Eastern Europe, particularly in states that later joined the European Union and NATO. At the same time, parts of the former Soviet Union experienced severe economic dislocation, declining living standards, and sharp reductions in life expectancy during the transition to market economies. Countries such as the Czech Republic, Estonia, Hungary, Latvia, Lithuania, Poland, and Slovakia experienced economic reconstruction, growth and fast integration with EU and NATO, while some of their eastern neighbors created hybrids of free market oligarchy system, post-communist corrupted administration and dictatorship.

Russia and some other Soviet successor states faced a chaotic and harsh transition from a command economy to free market capitalism following the dissolution of the Soviet Union. A large percentage of the population lived in poverty, growth of the gross domestic product declined, and life expectancy dropped sharply. Living conditions also declined in some other parts of the former Eastern bloc.

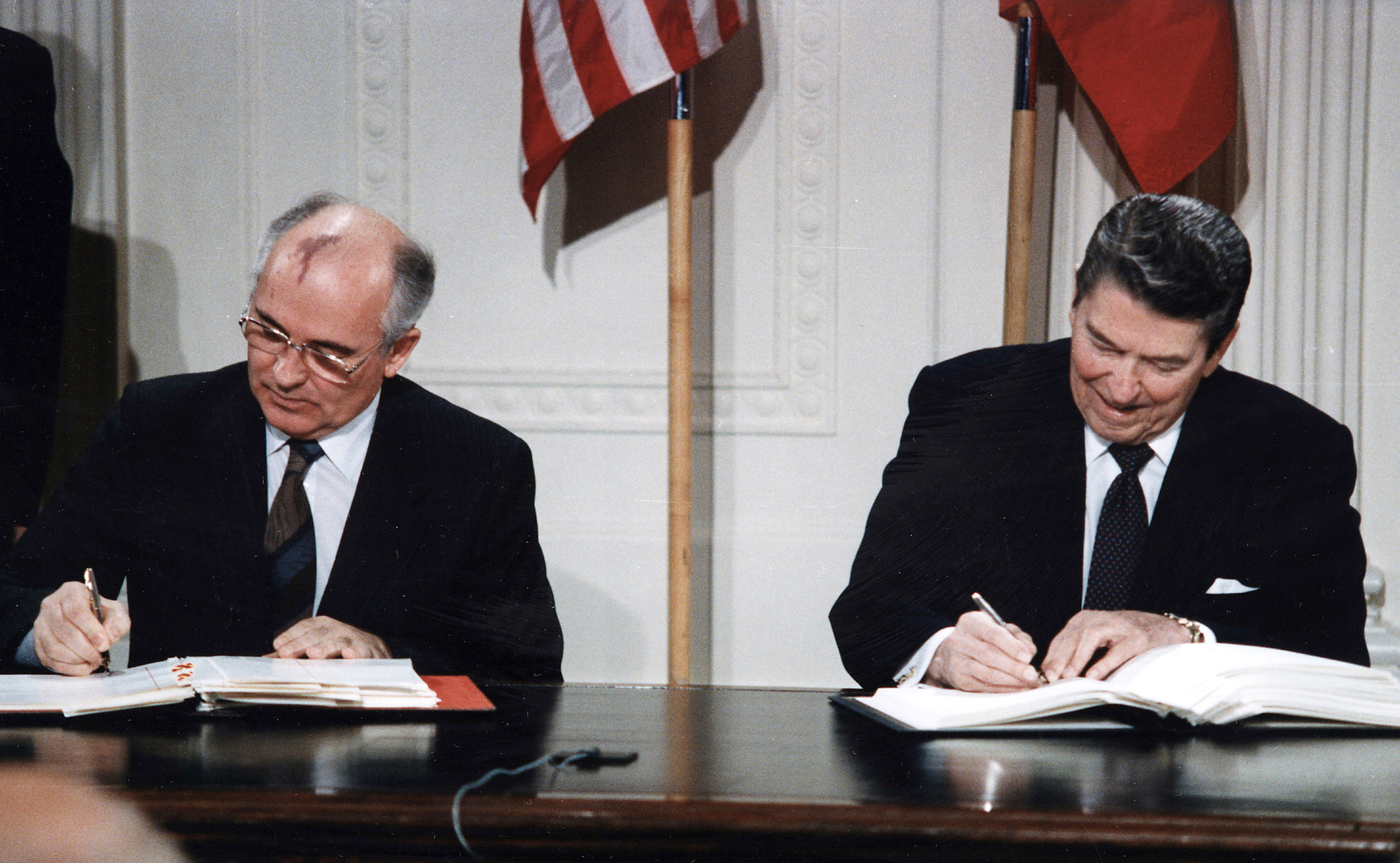
Soviet general secretary Gorbachev and U.S. president Reagan signing the INF Treaty, 1987

The post–Cold War era was marked by sustained economic prosperity in much of the Western world, particularly in the United States, alongside a broad wave of democratization across Latin America, Africa, and Central, South-East, and Eastern Europe.

Sociologist Immanuel Wallerstein expresses a less triumphalist view, arguing that the end of the Cold War is a prelude to the breakdown of Pax Americana. In his Foreign Policy essay entitled, "The Eagle Has Crash Landed", Wallerstein argues, "The collapse of communism in effect signified the collapse of liberalism, removing the only ideological justification behind US hegemony, a justification tacitly supported by liberalism's ostensible ideological opponent".

=== End of the Space Race ===
Following the end of ideological confrontation in the late 1980s and early 1990s, the political motivations that had sustained large-scale space competition largely disappeared. Although both the United States and Russia continued space activity, ambitious exploration programs declined as governments prioritized domestic economic concerns and no longer viewed spaceflight as a primary measure of global prestige.

=== Yugoslavia: A Comparative Case ===
Communist Yugoslavia's disintegration followed neither of the two paths that undid Marxism–Leninism elsewhere in the former Soviet bloc. In Poland, communism failed to displace an intact, near-universal Catholic identity—96 percent of the population—that had already served as the vehicle of Polish nationhood through a century of prior statelessness. Pope John Paul II's papacy turned that pre-existing unity into an organized moral insurgency, and Solidarity that facilitated changes there was sustained by a decade of Western diplomatic and intelligence backing. In East Germany, by contrast, forty years of state pressure had produced the least religious society anywhere in the Communist world—barely 10 percent of East Germans still professed any faith by 1989—yet the residual, fragmented Protestant church network remained the one institutional space the regime never fully supplanted, and so became by accident the incubator of the civic opposition that filled its churches with prayer vigils once Gorbachev signaled Moscow's abstention. Unlike Poland's decade-long insurgency, the GDR's collapse came suddenly and from outside, since East Germany, as historian Michael Burleigh observes, "ultimately collapsed because it had no external supporters" once its Soviet patron withdrew its backing.

Yugoslavia transitional route out of the Soviet orbit took another direction altogether. For instance, Tito's regime neither crushed Croatia's Catholic and Serbia's Orthodox identities into East German-style irrelevance, nor left either intact enough to serve, Solidarity-fashion, as a vehicle for negotiated transition. Instead, it suppressed several rival national-religious identities simultaneously without reconciling or replacing any of them, executing their clergy while never granting any single church the institutional standing that might have channeled opposition into round-table bargaining rather than open war. When Yugoslav communism finally exhausted itself, there was accordingly no Solidarity and no East German round table to absorb the shock—only the unmediated return of grievances a generation of enforced silence had left to fester rather than resolve.

This reading of Yugoslavia as suppression without resolution sits within a wider historiographical debate over causes, since the disintegration of Yugoslavia was, in historian Konrad Jarausch's opinion, the most drastic result of a failed post-communist transition anywhere in the former bloc. Jarausch stresses that some scholars point to "ancient hatreds" rooted in Ottoman rule or wartime collaboration, others to nationalism's revival as a substitute ideology across the whole post-communist world, still others to outside interference—chiefly the German-led recognition of Slovenian and Croatian independence—or to failed Western mediation.

Late historian Tony Judt likewise traced the trigger to Milošević's nationalist rise in Serbia from 1987 and to the failed hope for a "democratic and unified Yugoslavia" back to communism's collapse and the Cold War's end. Once Slovenia and Croatia seceded and the federal army moved on Slovenia's border, what followed were five distinct tragic wars that included a brief campaign against Slovenia ending in withdrawal, a bloodier Croatian-Serb war, the siege of Bosnia after its 1992 independence referendum, a separate Croat-Muslim conflict within Bosnia from 1993, and finally Kosovo, where Milošević—having lost everywhere else—turned back to the province he had first exploited in 1989, until NATO's 1999 military intervention stopped him.

== Timeline of related events ==
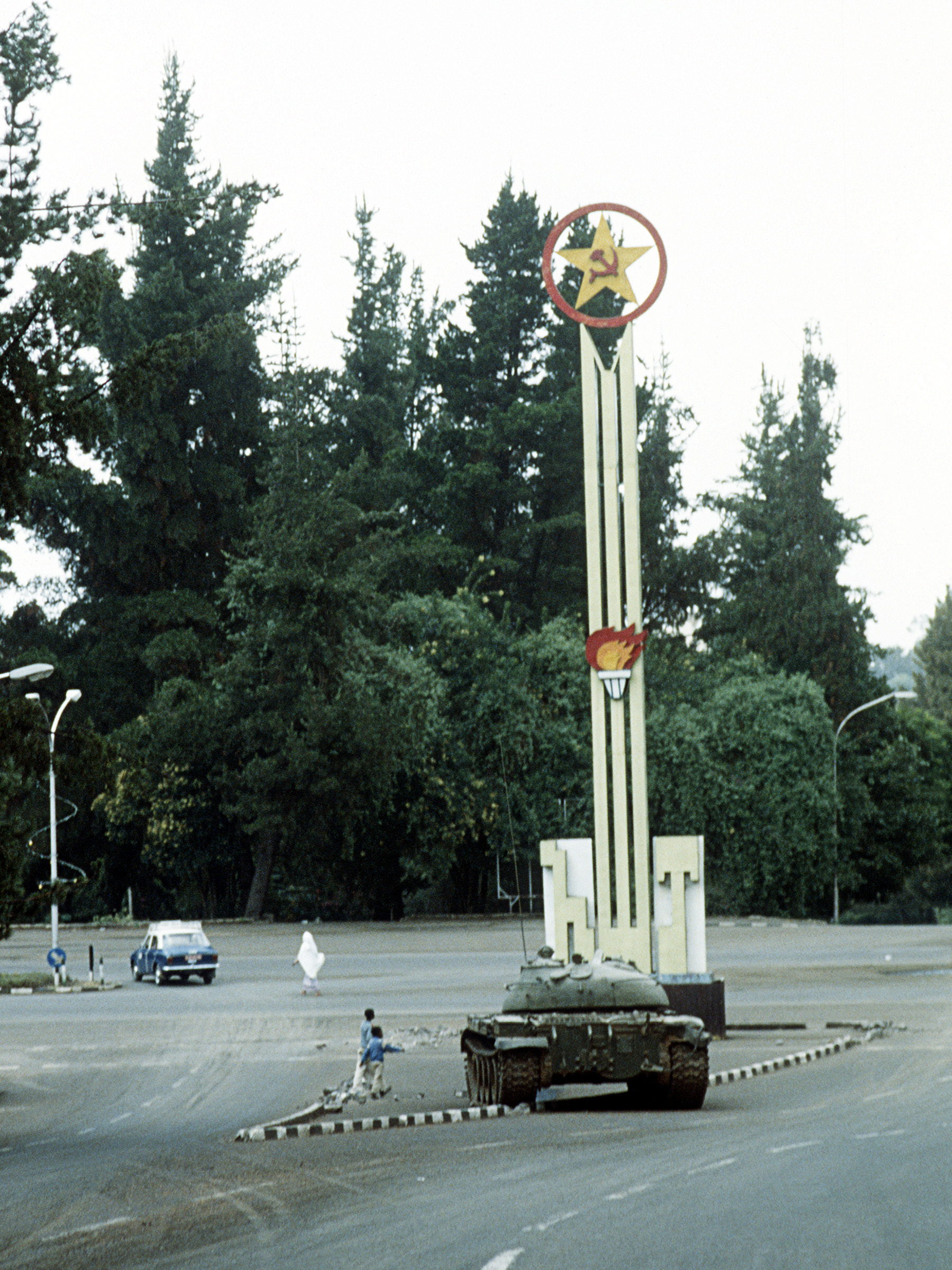
Ethiopian tanks pass a Communist memorial in Addis Ababa during the Ethiopian Civil War, 1991.

=== 1985 ===
- January 20, 1985 – Ronald Reagan is sworn in for a second term as President of the United States.
- March 10, 1985 – General Secretary of the Communist Party of the Soviet Union Konstantin Chernenko dies.
- March 11, 1985 – Soviet Politburo member Mikhail Gorbachev becomes the general secretary of the Communist Party.
- March 24, 1985 – Major Arthur D. Nicholson, a US Army Military Intelligence officer is shot to death by a Soviet sentry in East Germany. He is listed as the last US casualty in the Cold War.

=== 1986 ===
- January 1, 1986 – Reagan and Gorbachev give the other's nation a new year's address.
- February 22–25, 1986 – People Power Revolution successfully overthrows Ferdinand Marcos in the Philippines.
- April 26, 1986 – The Chernobyl Disaster.
- October 11–12 – The Reykjavik summit.

=== 1987 ===
- January 1987 – Gorbachev introduces the policy of demokratizatsiya in the Soviet Union.
- January 27, 1987 – The United States recognizes the independence of Mongolia and establishes diplomatic relations.
- March 4, 1987 – In a televised address, Reagan takes full responsibility for the Iran–Contra affair.
- June 12, 1987 – "Tear down this wall" speech by Reagan in West Berlin.
- June 29, 1987 – June Struggle in South Korea.
- July 15, 1987 – The Republic of China ends 38 years of martial law.
- November 15, 1987 – Brașov rebellion in Romania.
- December 8, 1987 – The Intermediate-Range Nuclear Forces Treaty is signed in Washington, D.C.

=== 1988 ===
- February 12, 1988 – Hostile rendezvous off coast of Crimea in Black Sea when the Soviet frigate Bezzavetnyy rammed the American missile cruiser USS Yorktown.
- February 20, 1988 – The regional soviet of Nagorno-Karabakh in Azerbaijan decides to be part of Armenia, but the Kremlin refuses to do it. The subsequent First Nagorno-Karabakh War would be the first of the internal conflicts in the Soviet Union that would become the post-Soviet separatist conflicts.
- August 8, 1988 – 8888 Uprising in Burma.
- August 17, 1988 – Pakistani president Muhammad Zia-ul-Haq dies.
- August 20, 1988 – End of Iran–Iraq War.
- September 17, 1988 – Summer Olympics in Seoul, South Korea; first time since 1976 that both Soviet Union and the United States participate; it is also the last Olympic Games for the Soviet Union and its satellite states.
- October 5, 1988 – Augusto Pinochet, dictator of Chile since September 1973, is defeated in a nationwide referendum.
- December 21, 1988 – Pan Am Flight 103 bombing.

=== 1989 ===
- January 7, 1989 – Japanese Emperor Hirohito dies, he was succeeded by his son Akihito.
- January 20, 1989 – George H. W. Bush becomes president of the United States.
- February 1989 – End of Soviet–Afghan War; continuation of internal conflict without Soviet troops.
- June 3, 1989 – Iranian leader Ayatollah Khomeini dies.
- June 4, 1989 – Tiananmen Square protests of 1989 in Beijing, People's Republic of China.
- June 4, 1989 – Solidarity's decisive victory in the first partially free parliamentary elections in post-war Poland sparks off a succession of anti-communist Revolutions of 1989 across Central, later South-East and Eastern Europe.
- August 14, 1989 – South African president Pieter Willem Botha resigns in reaction to the implementation of Tripartite Accord.
- August 19, 1989 – The opening of the border gate between Austria and Hungary at the Pan-European Picnic set in motion a chain reaction, at the end of which there was no longer a GDR and the Eastern Bloc had disintegrated.
- August 23, 1989 – Soviet Politburo member Alexander Yakovlev denounces the secret protocols of the Hitler-Stalin Pact.
- August 24, 1989 – Tadeusz Mazowiecki becomes the prime minister of Poland forming the first non-communist government in the Communist bloc.
- October 23, 1989 – End of Communism in Hungary.
- November 9, 1989 – Fall of the Berlin Wall.
- November 24, 1989 – Communist Party of Czechoslovakia leaders resign during the Velvet Revolution, effectively ending one-party rule in that country.
- December 2–3, 1989 – Malta Summit between Bush and Gorbachev, who said, "I assured the President of the United States that I will never start a hot war against the USA".
- December 10, 1989 – Czechoslovak President Gustáv Husák's resignation amounted to the fall of the Communist regime in Czechoslovakia, leaving Ceaușescu's Romania as the only remaining hard-line Communist regime in the Warsaw Pact.
- December 25, 1989 – Execution of Nicolae Ceauşescu during the Romanian Revolution against Communist Party rule.
- December 29, 1989 – Václav Havel assumes the presidency of Czechoslovakia at the conclusion of Velvet Revolution.
- December 30, 1989 – The Securitate, the secret police of Romania, is dissolved.

=== 1990 ===
- January 13, 1990 – The Stasi, the secret police of East Germany, is dissolved.
- January 22, 1990 – the League of Communists of Yugoslavia, the ruling party of the Socialist Federal Republic of Yugoslavia, is dissolved during its congress, ending the one party system in the country.
- February 1, 1990 – StB, the secret police of Czechoslovakia is dissolved.
- March 15, 1990 – Inauguration of Gorbachev as the first president of the Soviet Union.
- April 12, 1990 – The Socialist Republic of Slovenia within Yugoslavia holds its first multi-party elections.
- April 22–23 and May 6–7, 1990 – the Socialist Republic of Croatia within Yugoslavia holds its first multi-party elections.
- April 25, 1990 – Violeta Chamorro is sworn in as president of Nicaragua, ending the Sandinista rule and the Contras insurgency.
- May 22, 1990 – South and North Yemens are unified.
- June 8, 1990 – the Message from Turnberry, described as the "first official recognition of the end of the Cold War", is issued.
- July 5–6, 1990 – NATO holds its 11th summit in London.
- July 13, 1990 – The 28th Congress of the Communist Party of the Soviet Union announces the end of its monopoly of power.
- August 2, 1990 – Beginning of Gulf War.
- September 9, 1990 – Helsinki Summit between Bush and Gorbachev.
- September 12, 1990 – The Treaty on the Final Settlement with Respect to Germany is signed in Moscow.
- October 3, 1990 – Official reunification of Germany.
- November 6, 1990 – Hungary become the first Soviet Bloc country to join the Council of Europe.
- November 11, 1990 – The Socialist Republic of Macedonia within Yugoslavia holds its first multi-party elections.
- November 18, 1990 – The Socialist Republic of Bosnia and Herzegovina within Yugoslavia holds its first multiparty elections.
- November 19, 1990 – NATO and Warsaw Pact sign the Treaty on Conventional Armed Forces in Europe.
- November 28, 1990 – Margaret Thatcher falls from power as UK Prime Minister; John Major takes office.
- December 9, 1990 – The Socialist Republic of Montenegro within Yugoslavia holds its first multi-party elections.
- December 9–23, 1990 – The Socialist Republic of Serbia within Yugoslavia holds its first multi-party elections.
- December 22, 1990 – Lech Wałęsa becomes president of Poland; Polish government-in-exile ends.
- December 23, 1990 – Slovenia holds an independence referendum resulting in a majority of Slovenians voting in favour of Slovenia seeking independence from Yugoslavia.

=== 1991 ===
- January 1991 – Money transfers from the Czech Republic budget to the Slovak Republic are stopped, beginning the process that would lead to Velvet Divorce.
- February 28, 1991 – End of Gulf War.
- March 3, 1991 – Estonia and Latvia hold an independence referendum with a majority voting to restore independence.
- March 31, 1991 – Georgia holds an independence referendum resulting in a majority of Georgians voting in favour of Georgia becoming independent from the Soviet Union.
- May 1, 1991 – The Republic of China abolishes the Temporary Provisions against the Communist Rebellion which was in place during the Chinese Civil War.
- May 19, 1991 – Croatia holds an independence referendum resulting in a majority of Croatians voting in favour of Croatia seeking independence from Yugoslavia.
- May 24, 1991 – End of Eritrean War of Independence in Ethiopia.
- June 27, 1991 – Beginning of the Yugoslav Wars in Slovenia.
- June 28, 1991 – Comecon is dissolved.
- July 1, 1991 – The Warsaw Pact is dissolved.
- July 10, 1991 – Boris Yeltsin becomes president of Russia.
- July 31, 1991 – Ratification of START I treaty between United States and the Soviet Union.
- August 19, 1991 – Start of the Soviet Union coup d'état attempt.
- August 21, 1991 – The Soviet Union coup d'état is dissolved.
- August 24, 1991 – Gorbachev resigns from the post of General Secretary of the Communist Party of the Soviet Union.
- September 6, 1991 – The Soviet Union recognizes the independence of the Baltic States.
- September 8, 1991 – The Republic of Macedonia holds an independence referendum resulting in a majority of Macedonians voting in favour of Macedonia seeking independence from Yugoslavia.
- September 21, 1991 – Armenia holds an independence referendum resulting in a majority of Armenians voting in favour of Armenia becoming independent from the Soviet Union.
- October 26, 1991 – Turkmenistan holds an independence referendum resulting in a majority of voting in favour of Turkmenistan becoming independent of the Soviet Union.
- November 6, 1991 – The Communist Party of the Soviet Union and the Soviet KGB are dissolved.
- November 7–8, 1991 – NATO holds its 12th summit in Rome.
- December 8, 1991 – The Belavezha Accords are signed by the leaders of Russian Soviet Federative Socialist Republic, Ukrainian Soviet Socialist Republic and Byelorussian Soviet Socialist Republic, sealing the dissolution of the Soviet Union and the creation of the CIS.
- December 25, 1991 – Gorbachev resigns as President of the Soviet Union and the post is abolished; the red Soviet flag is lowered from the Moscow Kremlin, and in its place the flag of the Russian Federation is raised.
- December 26, 1991 – The Supreme Soviet dissolves the Soviet Union.

== See also ==
- History of the Soviet Union (1982–1991)
- History of the United States (1980–1991)
- Dissolution of the Soviet Union
- Post-Communism
- Reagan Doctrine
- Solidarity
- Timeline of events in the Cold War

== Bibliography ==
- Bartel, Fritz (2021). "Overcoming Stagnation". In Monteiro, Nuno P.; Bartel, Fritz (eds.). Before and After the Fall: World Politics and the End of the Cold War. Cambridge University Press. pp. 27–44. doi:10.1017/9781108910194.003. ISBN 978-1-108-90677-7. S2CID 244846930.
- BBC News (1989-12-03). "1989: Malta summit ends Cold War". British Broadcasting Corporation.
- Bohlen, Celestine (February 26, 1991). "Warsaw Pact Agrees to Dissolve Its Military Alliance by March 31". The New York Times.
- Brands, Hal (2008). From Berlin to Baghdad: America's Search for Purpose in the Post-Cold War World. The University Press of Kentucky. ISBN 978-0-81315-932-4.
- Brown, Archie (2010). "The Gorbachev Revolution and the End of the Cold War". In Leffler, Melvyn P.; Westad, Odd Arne (eds.). The Cambridge History of the Cold War, Volume III: Endings. Cambridge University Press. pp. 244–288. ISBN 978-0-52183-721-7.
- Burleigh, Michael (2006). Sacred Causes: The Clash of Religion and Politics, from the Great War to the War on Terror. New York: HarperCollins. ISBN 978-0-00719-574-9.
- Chamberlin, Paul Thomas (2018). The Cold War’s Killing Fields: Rethinking the Long Peace. New York: Harper. ISBN 978-0-06236-722-8.
- Cohen, Michael (December 15, 2011). "Peace in the Post-Cold War World". The Atlantic.
- CQ Press (2012). Guide to Congress (7th ed.). SAGE / CQ Press. pp. 252–253. ISBN 978-1-4522-3532-5.
- Csongos, Frank T. (1989). "U.S. would support Soviet intervention in Romania (Dec. 24, 1989)". UPI.
- Davis, Lynn E. (1988). "Lessons of the INF Treaty". Foreign Affairs. 66 (4): 720–734. JSTOR 20043479.
- English, Robert D. (2002). "Power, Ideas, and New Evidence on the Cold War's End". International Security. 26 (4): 70–92. JSTOR 3092110.
- Filippov, Mikhail G.; Ordeshook, Peter C.; Shvetsova, Olga V. (1999). "Party Fragmentation and Presidential Elections in Post-Communist Democracies". Constitutional Political Economy. 10 (1): 3–26. doi:10.1023/A:1009011307103.
- Fitzpatrick, Sheila (2022). The Shortest History of the Soviet Union. New York: Columbia University Press. ISBN 978-0-23120-717-1.
- Frank, Michael (2009). "Paneuropäisches Picknick: Mit dem Picknickkorb in die Freiheit (19. August 2009)". Süddeutsche Zeitung.
- Gaddis, John Lewis (2005). The Cold War: A New History. Penguin Press. ISBN 978-0-71399-928-0.
- Haftendorn, Helga (2010). "The Unification of Germany, 1985–1991". In Leffler, Melvyn P.; Westad, Odd Arne (eds.). The Cambridge History of the Cold War, Volume III: Endings. Cambridge University Press. pp. 333–355. ISBN 978-0-52183-721-7.
- Hitchcock, William I. (2003). The Struggle for Europe: The Turbulent History of a Divided Continent, 1945 to the Present. New York: Anchor Books. ISBN 0-385-49799-7.
- Hosking, Geoffrey (2001). Russia and the Russians: A History. Cambridge, MA: Belknap Press of Harvard University Press. ISBN 978-0-67401-114-4.
- Howell, B. Wayne (2008). "Reagan and Reykjavík: Arms Control, SDI, and the Argument from Human Rights". Rhetoric & Public Affairs. 11 (3): 389–415. JSTOR 41940375.
- Jarausch, Konrad (2015). Out of Ashes: A New History of Europe in the Twentieth Century. Princeton, NJ and Oxford: Princeton University Press. ISBN 978-0-69115-279-0.
- Jarausch, Konrad H. (2019). The Cold War: A History in Documents and Eyewitness Accounts. Oxford University Press. ISBN 978-0-19-006316-0.
- Jervis, Robert (2021). "The Nuclear Age". In Nuno P. Monteiro; Fritz Bartel (eds.). Before and After the Fall: World Politics and the End of the Cold War. Cambridge University Press. pp. 115–131. doi:10.1017/9781108910194.008. ISBN 978-1-108-90677-7. S2CID 244858515.
- Judt, Tony (2005). Postwar: A History of Europe Since 1945. New York: Penguin Books. ISBN 1-59420-065-3.
- Kort, Michael (1998). The Columbia Guide to the Cold War. New York: Columbia University Press. ISBN 0-231-10773-0.
- Kramer, Mark (2003). "The Collapse of East European Communism and the Repercussions Within the Soviet Union". Journal of Cold War Studies. 5 (4): 178–256.
- Lambeth, Benjamin; Lewis, Kevin (1988). "The Kremlin and SDI". Foreign Affairs. 66 (4): 755–770. doi:10.2307/20043481. JSTOR 20043481.
- Leebaert, Derek (2003). The Fifty-Year Wound. New York: Little, Brown and Company. ISBN 978-0-31616-496-2.
- Leffler, Andrzej (2004). "The Beginning and the End: Time, Context and the Cold War". In Olav Njolstad (ed.). The Last Decade of the Cold War: From Conflict Escalation to Conflict Transformation. London and New York: Frank Cass. pp. 60–97. ISBN 0-7146-5464-7.
- Lévesque, Jacques (2010). "The East European Revolutions of 1989". In Leffler, Melvyn P.; Westad, Odd Arne (eds.). The Cambridge History of the Cold War, Volume III: Endings. Cambridge University Press. pp. 311–332. ISBN 978-0-52183-721-7.
- Levitsky, Steven; Way, Lucan (2010). Competitive Authoritarianism: Hybrid Regimes after the Cold War (PDF). Cambridge: Cambridge University Press. ISBN 978-0-51178-135-3.
- Mania, Andrzej (2024). "Gorbachev – Reagan Geneva Summit, November 1985: Documentary Study". Ad Americam: Journal of American Studies. 25: 41–63. doi:10.12797/AdAmericam.25.2024.25.04.
- Marshall, Tyler (April 1, 1993). "Few Russian Troops Remain in Ex-Satellite States: Military: Of an estimated 600,000 in Eastern Europe in the late 1980s, only about 113,000 haven't gone home". Los Angeles Times.
- Mathews, Robert J.; McCormack, Timothy L. H. (1995). "Entry into Force of the Chemical Weapons Convention: National Requirements and Prospective Timetable". Security Dialogue. 26 (1): 93–107.
- McMahon, Robert (2003). The Cold War: A Very Short Introduction. Oxford and New York: Oxford University Press. ISBN 978-0-19280-178-4.
- McNeill, J. R. (2010). "The Biosphere and the Cold War". In Leffler, Melvyn P.; Westad, Odd Arne (eds.). The Cambridge History of the Cold War, Volume III: Endings. Cambridge University Press. pp. 422–444. ISBN 978-0-52183-721-7.
- Miller, David (1998). The Cold War: A Military History. New York: St. Martin’s Press. ISBN 978-0-31224-183-4.
- Moltz, James Clay (2019). "The Changing Dynamics of Twenty-First-Century Space Power". Journal of Strategic Security. 12 (1): 15–43. doi:10.5038/1944-0472.12.1.1729. JSTOR 26623076.
- Moravcsik, Andrew; Vachudova, Milada Anna (2002). "National Interests, State Power, and EU Enlargement" (PDF). Princeton University.
- Paczkowski, Andrzej (2004). "Playground of Superpowers, Poland 1980–89: A View from Inside". In Olav Njolstad (ed.). The Last Decade of the Cold War: From Conflict Escalation to Conflict Transformation. London and New York: Frank Cass. pp. 461–496. ISBN 0-7146-5464-7.
- Plokhy, Serhii (2014). The Last Empire: The Final Days of the Soviet Union. Basic Books. ISBN 978-0-46504-671-3.
- Podvig, Pavel (2017). "Did Star Wars Help End the Cold War? Soviet Response to the SDI Program". Science & Global Security. 25 (1): 3–27. doi:10.1080/08929882.2017.1273665. S2CID 59399449.
- Pravda, Alex (2010). "The Collapse of the Soviet Union, 1990–1991". In Leffler, Melvyn P.; Westad, Odd Arne (eds.). The Cambridge History of the Cold War, Volume III: Endings. Cambridge University Press. pp. 356–377. ISBN 978-0-52183-721-7.
- Radchenko, Sergey (2021). "Mikhail Gorbachev". In Nuno P. Monteiro; Fritz Bartel (eds.). Before and After the Fall: World Politics and the End of the Cold War. Cambridge University Press. pp. 45–61. doi:10.1017/9781108910194.008. ISBN 978-1-108-90677-7. S2CID 244858515.
- Radchenko, Sergey (2024). To Run the World: The Kremlin's Cold War Bid for Global Power. Cambridge University Press. ISBN 978-1-10847-735-2.
- Reynolds, David (2010). "Science, Technology, and the Cold War". In Leffler, Melvyn P.; Westad, Odd Arne (eds.). The Cambridge History of the Cold War, Volume III: Endings. Cambridge University Press. pp. 378–399. ISBN 978-0-52183-721-7.
- Roberts, J. M. (1996). A History of Europe. New York: Allen Lane. ISBN 978-0-96584-319-5.
- Roberts, J. M.; Westad, Odd Arne (2013). The Penguin History of the World (6th ed.). New York: Penguin. ISBN 978-0-14196-872-8.
- Robinson, Peter (Summer 2007). ""Tear Down This Wall": How Top Advisers Opposed Reagan's Challenge to Gorbachev—But Lost". Prologue Magazine. U.S. National Archives and Records Administration.
- Roland, Gérard (2002). "The Political Economy of Transition" (PDF). Journal of Economic Perspectives. 16 (1): 29–50. doi:10.1257/0895330027102.
- Ronald Reagan Presidential Library & Museum (January 1, 1986). "New Year's Messages of President Reagan and Soviet General Secretary Gorbachev". Ronald Reagan Presidential Library & Museum.
- Rustow, Dankwart A. (1977). "U.S.–Saudi Relations and the Oil Crises of the 1980s". Foreign Affairs. 55 (3): 494–516. doi:10.2307/20039683.
- Saal, Yuliya von (2014). KSZE-Prozess und Perestroika in der Sowjetunion: Demokratisierung, Werteumbruch und Auflösung 1985–1991 (in German). München: Oldenbourg Wissenschaftsverlag. ISBN 978-3-48675-787-3.
- Sancton, Thomas A. (March 7, 1988). "Soviet Union Defiance in the Streets". Time. Archived from the original on August 4, 2009.
- Sarotte, Mary Elise (2014). 1989: The Struggle to Create Post–Cold War Europe. Princeton University Press. ISBN 978-0-69115-241-7.
- United Nations Security Council (29 November 1990). "Resolution 678 (1990)".
- U.S. Department of State (2026). "Mongolia". Office of the Historian, U.S. Department of State.
- Walker, Martin (1995). The Cold War: A History. New York: Henry Holt & Co. ISBN 978-0-80503-454-7.
- Walker, J. Samuel (2011). Presidents and American Foreign Policy. Edinburgh University Press. ISBN 978-0-80477-499-4.
- Wallerstein, Immanuel (July–August 2002). "The Eagle Has Crash Landed". Foreign Policy. No. 131. pp. 60–68.
- Westad, Odd Arne (2017). The Cold War: A World History. Penguin Books. ISBN 978-0-46505-493-0.
- Weston, Burns H. (1991). "Security Council Resolution 678 and Persian Gulf Decision Making: Precarious Legitimacy". American Journal of International Law. 85 (3): 516–535. JSTOR 2203110.
- Wilson, James Graham (2018). "Reagan and Gorbachev". Diplomatic History. 42 (4): 552–555. doi:10.1093/dh/dhy056.
- Young, John W. (2010). "Western Europe and the End of the Cold War, 1979–1989". In Leffler, Melvyn P.; Westad, Odd Arne (eds.). The Cambridge History of the Cold War, Volume III: Endings. Cambridge University Press. pp. 289–310. ISBN 978-0-52183-721-7.

=== Further reading ===
- Ball, S. J. The Cold War: An International History, 1947–1991 (1998). British perspective
- Beschloss, Michael, and Strobe Talbott. At the Highest Levels:The Inside Story of the End of the Cold War (1993)
- Braithwaite, Rodric et al. "Could the Soviet Union Have Survived? We ask four historians whether the demise of one of the 20th century's superpowers was as inevitable as it now seems." History Today (Oct 2020) 70#10 pp 8–10 [online].
- Brooks, Stephen G., and William C. Wohlforth. "Power, globalization, and the end of the Cold War: Reevaluating a landmark case for ideas." International Security 25.3 (2001): 5-53. [online]
- Engel, Jeffrey A. When the World Seemed New: George H. W. Bush and the End of the Cold War (2017)
- Gaddis, John Lewis. The United States and the End of the Cold War: Implications, Reconsiderations, Provocations (1992) online
- Garthoff, Raymond. The Great Transition: American-Soviet Relations and the End of the Cold War (1994) online
- Goertz, Gary and Jack S. Levy, eds. Causal explanations, necessary conditions, and case studies: World War I and the End of the Cold War (2005), 10 essays from political scientists; online
- Hogan, Michael, ed. The End of the Cold War. Its Meaning and Implications (1992) articles from Diplomatic History
- Kalinovsky, Artemy M. "New Histories of the End of the Cold War and the Late Twentieth Century." Contemporary European History 27.1 (2018): 149–161. online
- Kegley Jr, Charles W. "How did the Cold War die? Principles for an autopsy." Mershon International Studies Review 38.Supplement_1 (1994): 11–41.
- Kenney, Padraic. 1989: Democratic Revolutions at the Cold War's End: A Brief History with Documents (2009) covers Poland, the Philippines, Chile, South Africa, Ukraine, and China
- Leffler, Melvyn P. For the Soul of Mankind: The United States, the Soviet Union, and the Cold War (2007) pp 338–450.
- Mann, James. The Rebellion of Ronald Reagan: A History of the End of the Cold War (2010). popular
- Matlock, Jack F. Autopsy on an Empire (1995) online by US ambassador to Moscow
- Matlock, Jack F. Reagan and Gorbachev : how the Cold War ended (2004) online
- Powaski, Ronald E. The Cold War: The United States and the Soviet Union, 1917–1991 (1998)
- Romero, Federico. "Cold War historiography at the crossroads." Cold War History 14.4 (2014): 685–703. online
- Shultz, George P. Turmoil and Triumph: My Years as Secretary of State (1993), a primary source
- Wilson, James Graham. The Triumph of Improvisation: Gorbachev's Adaptability, Reagan's Engagement, and the End of the Cold War (2014)
- Wohlforth, William C. "Realism and the End of the Cold War." International Security 19.3 (1994): 91–129. online
- Zubok, Vladislav M. "Gorbachev and the End of the Cold War: Perspectives on History and Personality," Cold War History (2002) 2:2, 61–100, DOI: 10.1080/713999954
- Zubok, Vladislav M. (2009). A failed empire: the Soviet Union in the Cold War from Stalin to Gorbachev. Chapel Hill, NC: University of North Carolina Press. Archived from the original on September 19, 2020 – via Questia.
