= 2008 Bucharest NATO summit =

2008 NATO summit meeting in Bucharest, Romania

Bucharest summit
- Bucharest summit logo
- Host country: Romania
- Dates: 2–4 April 2008
- Venues: Palace of the Parliament, Bucharest

The 2008 Bucharest Summit was a NATO summit organized in the Palace of the Parliament, Bucharest, Romania on 2 – 4 April 2008.

Among other business, Croatia and Albania were invited to join the Alliance. The Republic of Macedonia (now North Macedonia) was not invited to join NATO due to its ongoing naming dispute with Greece. Georgia and Ukraine had hoped to join the NATO Membership Action Plan, but, while welcoming the two countries’ aspirations for membership and agreeing that "these countries will become members of NATO", the NATO members decided to review their request in December 2008. The summit was also attended by the leaders of Austria, Cyprus, Finland, Ireland, Malta and Sweden countries that are members of the EU but not member of NATO as well as President of the European Commission José Manuel Barroso.

== Prior protests in Brussels ==
Protests against NATO's role in "promoting war" were held at NATO's HQ in Brussels two weeks before the summit, and in Bucharest. Protesters targeted the renewed determination of NATO to use nuclear weapons and NATO's backing of the US anti-missile shield.

== Summit agenda ==
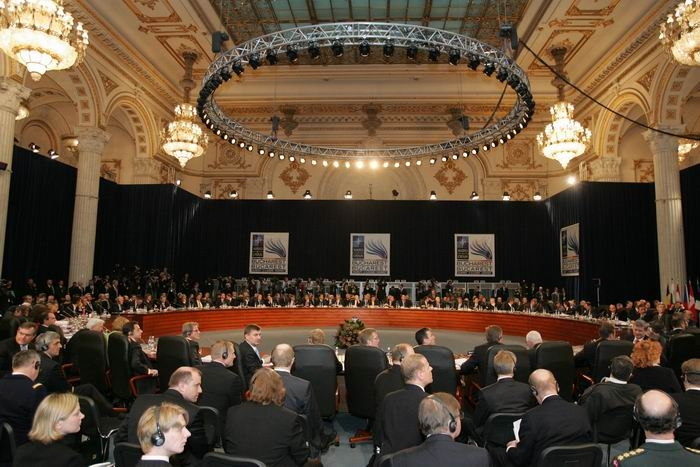
The summit

As said by Craig Kennedy in an introduction to the NATO Bucharest summit and from the NATO summit program.

- NATO's capability and capacity.
- The tensions in the Russia-NATO relationship (3 and 4 April).
- Cyber security.
- EU-NATO partnership.
- Energy security.
- Stability of the Western Balkans.
- The mission in Afghanistan (2 and 3 April).
- NATO enlargement (Albania, former Yugoslav republics Croatia and Macedonia).
- NATO Action Plan membership (Georgia and Ukraine) (4 April).
- Moldova's future in NATO.

== Host ==
Romania competed for the organization of this summit with Portugal, which initially was scheduled to host the summit in 2006, but eventually conceded in favor of Latvia, which held the 2006 Riga Summit. Romania received support from the United States, and U.S. Under Secretary of State R. Nicholas Burns said in December 2006 that Romania deserved the honor to hold this event due to its contribution to the Alliance's common effort in the War in Afghanistan and for stability in the Iraq War. Romania has been a member of NATO since 14 March 2004.

== Security measures ==
The security of the summit was assured by the host country. The mobilized forces included some 5,000 military servicemen, 9,000 policemen, 8,000 gendarms, 1,800 border policemen, and 2,550 others, including the Protection and Guard Service, and the Intelligence Service.

During the summit, the terrorist threat alert was raised from blue level (caution) to yellow (moderate), with the necessary measures taken by the institutions of the Romanian state. For travel from the Henri Coandă International Airport to the Palace of the Parliament, 39 Mercedes S-Guard and E-Guard armored sedans were provided for the state leaders, as well as another 500 Mercedes, Cadillac, and Ford unarmored cars. The traffic was restricted, and a traffic corridor was reserved for the official delegations.

=== Operation Noble Endeavor ===
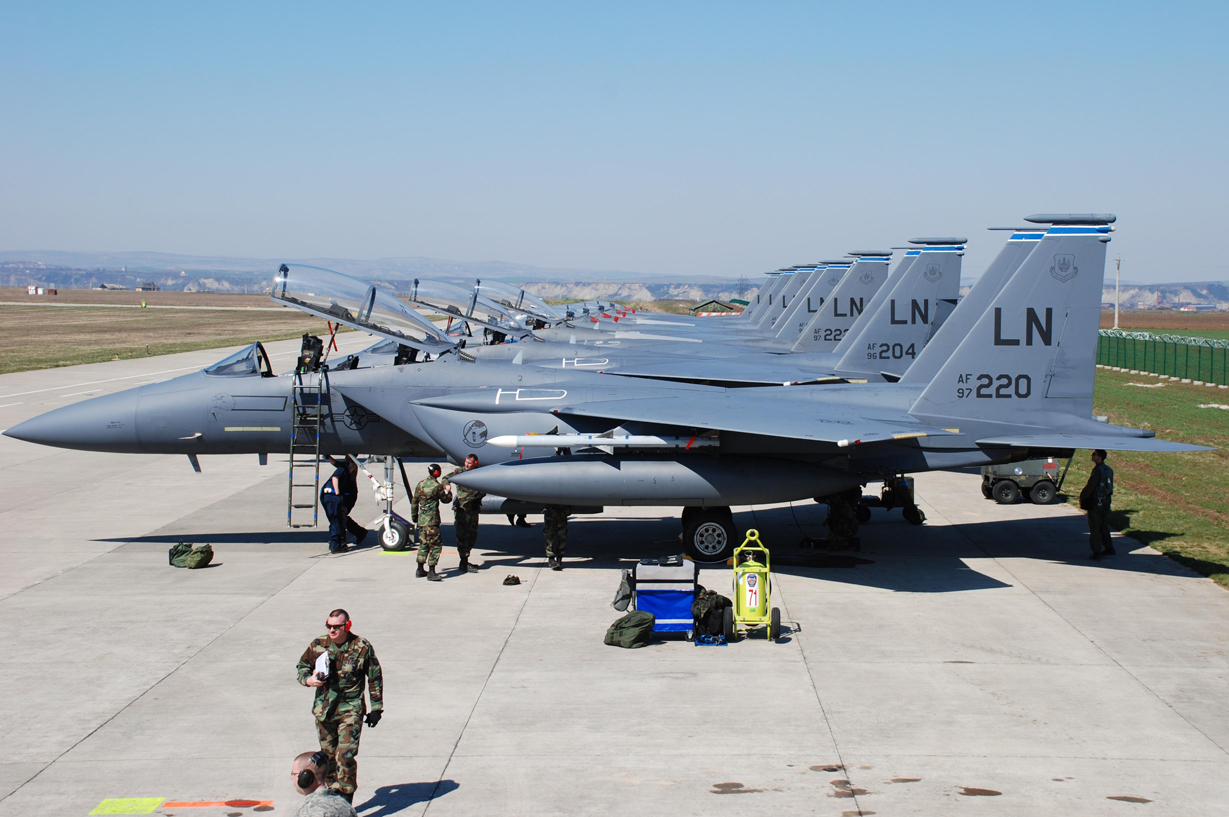
F-15E fighters at Câmpia Turzii

To protect the skies above the summit, Romania launched Operation Noble Endeavor, an effort of the Romanian Air Force to provide air policing missions. On Romania's request, the U.S. Air Force augmented the Romanian forces in the mission. For this task, the USAF activated the 323d Air Expeditionary Wing at Balotești, near Bucharest. The role of the 323d was to direct and coordinate the deployment of American aircraft, as well as support, maintenance, operations and medical personnel across eastern Europe. The deployment included F-15E Strike Eagle fighters at Câmpia Turzii in Romania, and at Graf Ignatievo in Bulgaria, as well as KC-135 Stratotankers at the Budapest International Airport in Hungary.

For the duration of the summit, the fighter jets remained on high alert and conducted combat air patrols over Bucharest, providing a show of force to repel any threats. The 323d AEW was inactivated at the end of the month after the summit, on 30 April.

== Non-invitation ==
An invitation to join the Alliance was not extended to the Republic of Macedonia (now North Macedonia). Greece had threatened on several occasions to veto the country's NATO bid due to the longstanding naming dispute over the latter's name. The last UN proposal before the summit was the name "Republic of Macedonia (Skopje)", which was rejected by Greece. Athens argues that use of the name "Macedonia" implies territorial claims on its own region of Macedonia. Macedonia denied it, citing constitutional amendments that specifically exclude "territorial pretensions". NATO officials said the country could begin talks on joining the alliance as soon as it had resolved its dispute with Greece.

While under the terms of the Interim Accord, signed between the two parties in 1995, Greece agreed not to block "membership in international, multilateral and regional organizations and institutions" under the acronym "FYROM", Greece expected that the country would immediately request recognition by its constitutional name once it gained entry into the organization. According to politicians in Macedonia, Greece had directly breached the Interim Accord.

The governments that supported its membership bid argued that the country had completed the necessary reforms for membership and that regional stability would be challenged if it did not join NATO. Conversely, Greece contended that although Macedonia rejected territorial claims officially, in practice there have been numerous irredentist provocations by high government officials, schoolbooks, and other governmental publications. Senior officials in Macedonia asserted that the country had fulfilled NATO requirements to join and was being "punished" for its identity.

After an application for ruling submitted after the Summit by Macedonia under the "FYROM" reference against Greece on this matter before the International Court of Justice, on 5 December 2011 the Court ruled that Greece had indeed breached the accords and was wrong to do so.

== Russian presence ==
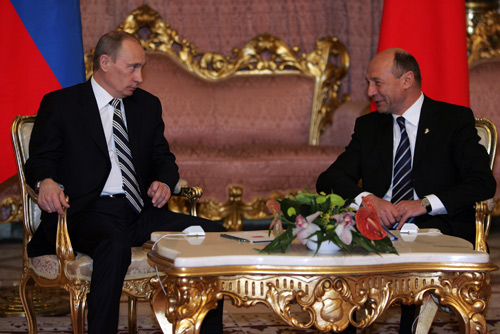
Romanian President Traian Băsescu and Russian President Vladimir Putin, before NATO summit, in Bucharest, on 4 April 2008.

Russian President Vladimir Putin was invited to the summit, and he arrived on the second day (3 April) to participate in bilateral NATO–Russia talks. He opposed the US plans to deploy missile defenses in Poland and the Czech Republic, which was discussed at the summit. Russia also opposed Georgia and Ukraine's NATO membership bids.

== Outcome ==
=== Summary of 2 April ===
- German Minister of Foreign affairs Frank-Walter Steinmeier talked about Ukraine and Georgia and tried not to provoke Russia by doing so, as they are both on Russia's borders and are both former Soviet states. Romanian President Traian Băsescu said Romania's approach to the relationship with Russia was to "leave behind the Cold War logic."
- U.S. President George W. Bush had a meeting at Neptun with President Băsescu about visas for one another's countries and working on organising bilateral relationships. President Băsescu claimed Romania deserved to have better relations with the US as it had sent troops to Iraq and Afghanistan and had worked with the US.
- NATO Secretary General Jaap de Hoop Scheffer opened the 'Securing our future' exhibition. The display 'Defence against terrorism' was launched in the same exhibition and there were talks about NATO's involvement in Iraq and Afghanistan and making it a success.
- United States, Canada, Poland, Romania, the Czechs and the Baltic States, strongly supported Ukraine and Georgia becoming NATO action plan members; however, they were strongly opposed by Germany, France, Italy, Spain, the Netherlands and Belgium. Against the urging of President George W. Bush, France and Germany blocked both Georgia and Ukraine from joining NATO. Germany instead focusing on reconciliation and maintaining its dependence on gas from Russia. Also, there were concerns with respect to governance and corruption within both countries, or their ability to pull out of nefarious influence in the CIS. "Ukraine is seen by Russia as part of its own historic and cultural domain," Dutch politician warned. The British judgment is that, although there was full support for both Ukraine and Georgia, the question of when they joined should remain in the balance.
- President Bush said he is "satisfied with the NATO commitment to Afghanistan". Countries such as France and Romania promised to send more troops to support the NATO mission in Afghanistan.
- Jaap de Hoop Scheffer and Danish Prime Minister Anders Fogh Rasmussen launched a new web-based television channel meant to improve understanding of the Alliance roles, operation and missions at the NATO Summit in Bucharest.

=== Summary of 3 April ===
- A consensus was reached on Croatia and Albania: the two countries were invited to begin accession talks to join the Alliance.
- The Former Yugoslav Republic Of Macedonia's NATO bid was not accepted due to the name dispute with Greece. However Jaap de Hoop Scheffer said that the invitation will be offered to Skopje authorities "as soon as possible, as soon as a solution will be found". FYROM officials expressed their disappointment and argued that the decision would undermine stability in the Balkans. All NATO members agreed in writing that FYROM would not be able to join the alliance until it has settled its dispute with Greece.
- The Alliance did not offer a Membership Action Plan to Georgia or Ukraine, largely due to the opposition of Germany and France, but pledged to review the decision in December 2008. Even though Georgia was not offered MAP, it welcomed the decision and said "The decision to accept that we are going forward to an adhesion to NATO was taken and we consider this is a historic success". However, the Summit Declaration stated: "NATO’s door will remain open to European democracies willing and able to assume the responsibilities and obligations of membership, in accordance with Article 10 of the Washington Treaty. We reiterate that decisions on enlargement are for NATO itself to make. [...] NATO welcomes Ukraine’s and Georgia’s Euro-Atlantic aspirations for membership in NATO. We agreed today that these countries will become members of NATO. Both nations have made valuable contributions to Alliance operations. We welcome the democratic reforms in Ukraine and Georgia and look forward to free and fair parliamentary elections in Georgia in May. MAP is the next step for Ukraine and Georgia on their direct way to membership. Today we make clear that we support these countries’ applications for MAP."
- Nicolas Sarkozy of France confirmed he would send a battalion of troops (around 800) to the East of Afghanistan, to ensure Canada could remain in the Kandahar province. Prime Minister Stephen Harper was threatening to remove Canada from the combat mission if another 1000 troops were not sent as reinforcements.
- President Sarkozy also said that France could be reintegrated into the NATO military command at the next Alliance Summit in 2009, after it left the NATO military command in 1966.
- Bosnia and Herzegovina and Montenegro started the NATO intense dialogue phase and the alliance is thinking of co-operating with Serbia too.
- Vladimir Putin, the President of the Russian Federation, arrived in Bucharest to participate in Friday's NATO-Russia Council session. President Putin will present to the members of the Alliance Moscow's point of view regarding the future collaboration in the Council, and the challenges that the contemporary world faces. President Putin attended the summit with a positive attitude and wanted to avoid the disputes relating to recognition of the Kosovo province or the missile shield, and the speech of the Russian President was expected to be moderate.
- NATO announced its support for the territorial integrity, independence and sovereignty of Armenia, Azerbaijan, Georgia and Moldova.
- Malta re-joined the NATO Partnership for Peace after leaving it once before in October 1996.

=== Summary of 4 April ===
- President Vladimir Putin invited Romanian President Băsescu to visit Russia at dinner. The two leaders agreed upon a bilateral meeting. During the dinner, President Putin had a range of meetings with the US President George W. Bush with whom he discussed about the meeting in Sochi set for 6 April, with German Chancellor Angela Merkel, with UN Secretary General Ban Ki-moon, who is expected in Russia on 9 April, and with President of the European Commission, José Manuel Durão Barroso.
- Russia signed an agreement with NATO permitting transit across Russia of non-military equipment, food products, fuel and transport vehicles to forces in Afghanistan.
- NATO and Russia disagreed over Kosovo and no consensus was reached. Jaap de Hoop Scheffer said that "The debate on Kosovo should continue because we had a round of different opinions".

== After the summit ==
- Poland claimed it was satisfied with the NATO summit. The Polish delegation at the NATO summit in Bucharest was satisfied with the Organisation's declaration supporting the deployment of the US anti-missile shield in Europe, Sławomir Nowak, the head of PM's political cabinet, has said.
- Russian President Putin was pleased about the alliance deciding not to invite Georgia and Ukraine to the Membership Action Plan at least for the time being.
- NATO Spokesman, James Appathurai, has spoken about the positive results of the high level reunion concerning the Alliance enlargement and NATO missile defence, which will be complementary to the American one. He was pleased about Albania and Croatia. He also said that the Former Yugoslav Republic Of Macedonia is still at the "alliance's door" and will be invited to join NATO as soon as the naming dispute is resolved.

== Member states leaders and other dignitaries in attendance ==
- Belgium – Prime Minister Yves Leterme
- Bulgaria – President Georgi Parvanov
- Canada – Prime Minister Stephen Harper
- Czech Republic – Prime Minister Mirek Topolánek
- Denmark – Prime Minister Anders Fogh Rasmussen
- Estonia – Prime Minister Andrus Ansip
- France – President Nicolas Sarkozy
- Germany – Chancellor Angela Merkel
- Greece – Prime Minister Kostas Karamanlis
- Hungary – Prime Minister Ferenc Gyurcsány
- Iceland – Prime Minister Geir Haarde
- Italy – Prime Minister Romano Prodi
- Latvia – President Valdis Zatlers
- Lithuania – President Valdas Adamkus
- Luxembourg – Prime Minister Jean-Claude Juncker
- Netherlands – Prime Minister Jan Peter Balkenende
- Norway – Prime Minister Jens Stoltenberg
- Poland – President Lech Kaczyński
- Portugal – Prime Minister José Sócrates
- Romania – President Traian Băsescu
- Slovakia – President Ivan Gašparovič
- Slovenia – Prime Minister Janez Janša
- Spain – Prime Minister José Luis Rodríguez Zapatero
- Turkey – President Abdullah Gül
- United Kingdom – Prime Minister Gordon Brown
- United States – President George W. Bush
- NATO – Secretary General Jaap de Hoop Scheffer

=== Non-member states and organisations ===
- Afghanistan – President Hamid Karzai
- Albania – Prime Minister Sali Berisha
- Armenia – President Robert Kocharyan
- Austria – President Heinz Fischer
- Azerbaijan – President Ilham Aliyev
- Bosnia and Herzegovina – Chairman of the Presidency Haris Silajdžić
- Croatia – President Stjepan Mesić
- Cyprus – President Demetris Christofias
- Finland – President Tarja Halonen
- Georgia – President Mikheil Saakashvili
- Ireland – Taoiseach Bertie Ahern
- Macedonia – Prime Minister Nikola Gruevski
- Malta – Prime Minister Lawrence Gonzi
- Moldova – President Vladimir Voronin
- Montenegro – President Filip Vujanović
- Russia – President Vladimir Putin
- Serbia – President Boris Tadić
- Sweden – Prime Minister Fredrik Reinfeldt
- Switzerland – Federal Council Eveline Widmer-Schlumpf
- Ukraine – President Viktor Yushchenko
- European Union – President-in-Office of the European Council Janez Janša
- European Union – President of the European Commission José Manuel Barroso
