= Message from Turnberry =

Diplomatic message from the North Atlantic Council

The Message from Turnberry (also known as message of Turnberry or the Turnberry message) was a message of 8 June 1990 sent by the North Atlantic Council meeting on June 7–8 near the ruins of the Turnberry Castle, Scotland, addressed "to the Soviet Union and to all other European countries"; effectively meaning the Warsaw Pact (Warsaw Treaty Organization) and neutral European nations, offering "friendship and cooperation... to help build a new peaceful order in Europe, based on freedom, justice and democracy".

== Background ==
The message was issued in the aftermath of the Autumn of Nations events in Eastern Europe. Around the same time, the Warsaw Pact was also holding their own meeting, and the Communist Party of the Soviet Union would hold one in the near future, giving ample opportunity for the Communists to issue a reply.

The message has been called a success of the German diplomacy, in particular, German diplomat Dieter Kastrup, on the path to German reunification. Other notable supporters of this message included German Foreign Minister Hans-Dietrich Genscher and American Secretary of State James Baker. Canada was also described as a vocal supporter of the message among the NATO parties.

== Significance ==
The message, issued in addition to the normal NATO communiques, was quickly picked up by international media. It has been called "exceptional", and the "first official recognition of the end of the Cold War", a "hand of friendship", as well as "the first step in the evolution of NATO-Russia relations". The message has also been described as laying down the foundations of NATO's modern partnership and outreach programmes. It was followed a month later by the NATO's 1990 London summit which further declared that "USSR and Warsaw Pact are no longer enemies". Also that month, the NATO Secretary General, Manfred Wörner, visited Moscow to discuss future cooperation, a first for NATO–Russia relations.

The process of de-escalation would lead to the formation of the Euro-Atlantic Partnership Council in 1997.

== See also ==
- Post–Cold War era
- Russia–NATO relations
