= 1990 London NATO summit =

1990 NATO summit meeting in London, England

NATO Summit London 1990 1990 London Summit
- Host country: United Kingdom
- Date: 5–6 July 1990
- Cities: London

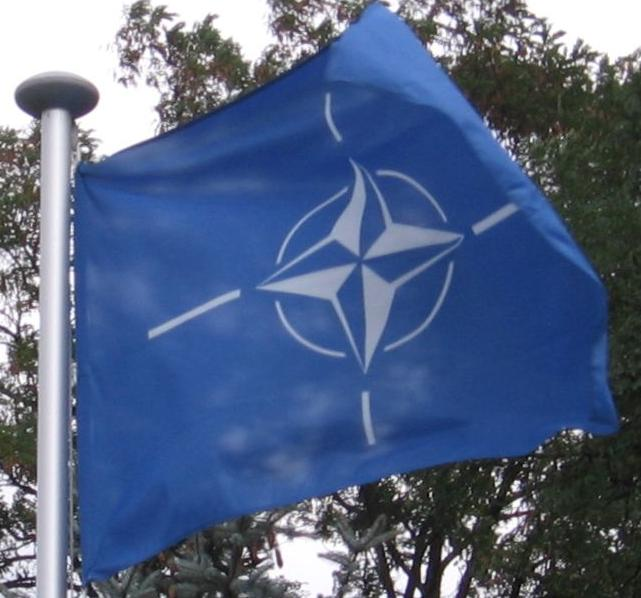
NATO flag

The 1990 London summit was the 11th NATO summit since 1949. The ones before had been in November 1985, March 1988 and May 1989.

It was held in London on 5–6 July 1990. The principal outcome of the summit was the London Declaration on a Transformed North Atlantic Alliance.

The declaration, shaped in the midst of a changing Europe (→ Revolutions of 1989), called for substantial changes in the organisation to ensure it could adapt to a rapidly evolving political landscape. Additionally, the declaration called for reductions in short-range nuclear capabilities, and re-focusing its long-term strategic plans with associated changes to the structure and quantity of its military.

The declaration reinforced a message given days earlier stating that NATO no longer saw the Warsaw Pact countries as enemies, and opening up channels for communication and aid with the former eastern bloc states. NATO extended a "hand of friendship" to eastern European nations.

One year later, on 20 December 1991, NATO and former members of the Warsaw Pact formed the North Atlantic Cooperation Council (NACC), now called the Euro-Atlantic Partnership Council.

== Other ==
The Paris Charter was adopted by a summit meeting of most European governments in addition to those of Canada, the United States and the Soviet Union, in Paris from 19 to 21 November 1990. The charter was established on the foundation of the Helsinki Accords, and was further amended in the 1999 Charter for European Security. Together, these documents form the agreed basis for the OSCE (Organization for Security and Co-operation in Europe).

On 1 July 1991, the Warsaw Pact was officially dissolved at a meeting in Prague. At a summit later that same month, USSR President Mikhail Gorbachev and US President George H. W. Bush declared a US–Soviet strategic partnership, decisively marking the end of the Cold War.

== See also ==
- Message from Turnberry
