= 1991 Rome NATO summit =

1991 NATO summit meeting in Rome, Italy

Rome summit
- Host country: Italy
- Dates: 7–8 November 1991

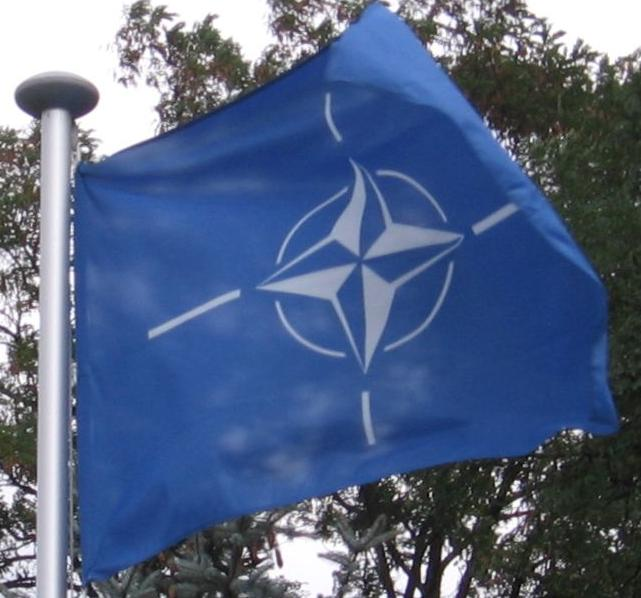
Flag of NATO

The 1991 Rome summit was the 12th NATO summit bringing the leaders of member nations together at the same time. The formal sessions and informal meetings in Rome, Italy took place on 7–8 November 1991.

== Background ==
The United States, with Germany's support, proposed reconfiguring NATO's military. The military planners projections contemplated an emphasis smaller, highly mobile forces geared for fast reaction to an array of potential contingencies other than the defense of Western Europe against a conventional large-force assault. The re-constituted NATO-assets would be flexibly available for a broadly defined range of NATO-directed missions. The unanimous agreement with the essentials of these proposed changes was officially confirmed at the Rome summit. Although the French joined in principle in agreeing to the reformation of NATO's military, this did not signal that France would re-join NATO's military structure.

== Accomplishments ==
The Alliance's New Strategic Concept was published on the first day of the summit.

The Rome Declaration on Peace and Cooperation was issued on the second day of the summit.
