= James Baker as Secretary of State =

Leadership of the US Department of State 1989–1992

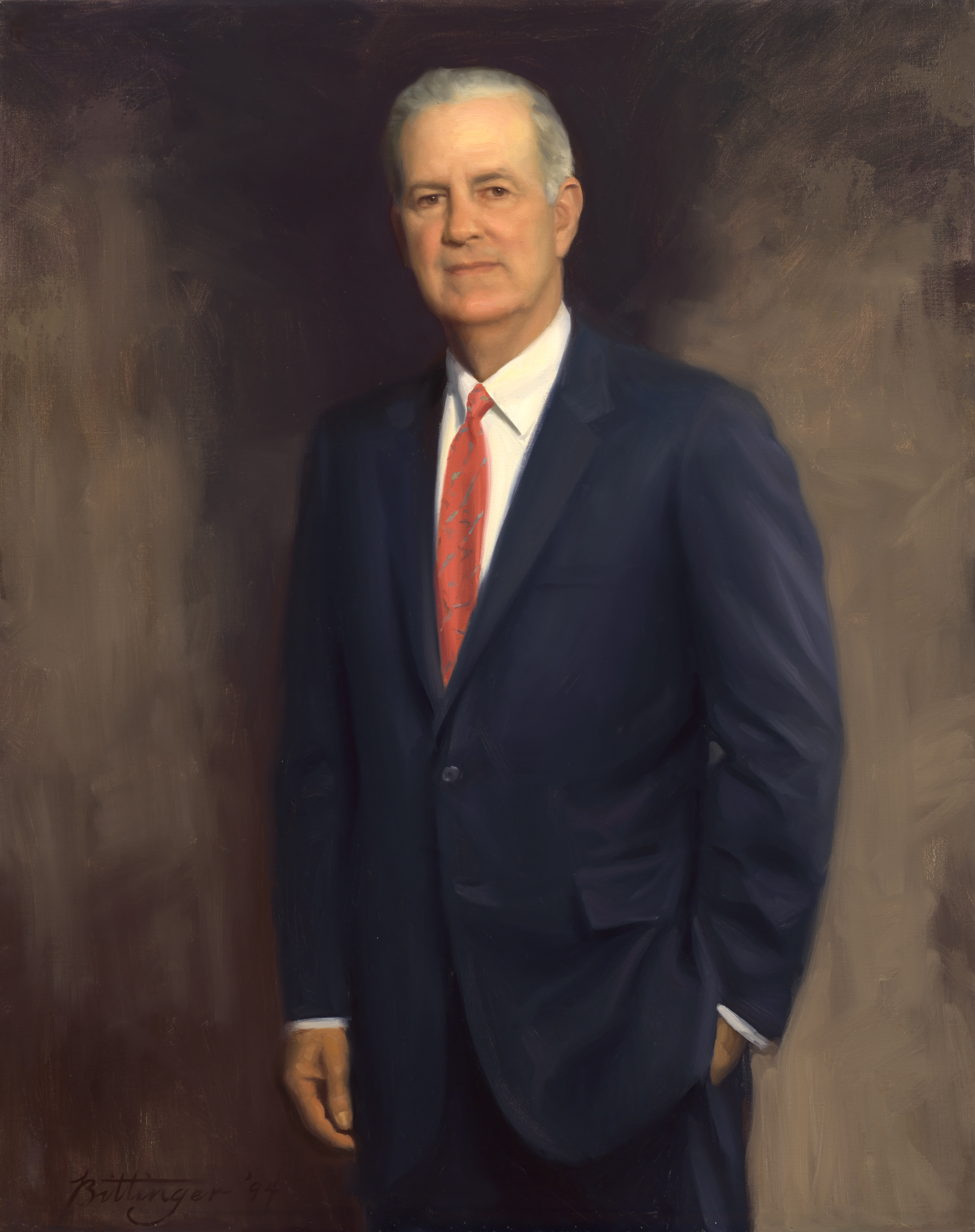
- Official portrait, 1991
- James Baker as Secretary of State; January 25, 1989 – August 23, 1992
- Party: Republican
- Nominated by: George H.W. Bush
- Seat: Harry S Truman Building
- Seal of the United States Secretary of State

James Baker served as the 61st United States secretary of state under George H.W. Bush. He held the position from his Senate confirmation in January 1989 until August 1992, when he left to help Bush's re-election campaign as White House chief of staff. In this role, he was influential in determining the administration's foreign policy.

As Secretary of State, Baker helped oversee U.S. foreign policy during the end of the Cold War and dissolution of the Soviet Union. He traveled extensively to negotiate political and financial support for a coalition effort to reverse Iraq's invasion of Kuwait in what became the Gulf War. He also worked on administration prerogatives in Nicaragua and in convening the Madrid Conference of 1991.

== Background ==
President George H. W. Bush announced Baker as his choice for secretary of state the day after his election victory. The Senate unanimously confirmed Baker on January 25, 1989.

Some perspective at the time framed Baker as equal to the president, which Bush wrote in his diary was "nonsense." Even so, Baker's close friendship with Bush and his status in Washington made him a powerful figure in the political landscape. National Security Advisor Brent Scowcroft originally deferred to Baker as the public foreign policy voice of the administration, despite longstanding institutional competition between the two positions. Columnist William Safire predicted that he would define the administration's foreign policy, for better or worse. As Baker's biographers Susan Glasser and Peter Baker (no relation) summarized the view:

[Baker] had an advantage that no secretary of state before him ever had. [...] No one could go around him or over his head. [Vice President Dan] Quayle and others had already tried, and Baker invariably shut them down, often by directly intervening with Bush. If Baker declared a position on behalf of America, his interlocutors knew it would stick. And if he made a promise, they knew he could deliver. For nearly four years, it was almost as if the country had a second president to send overseas to negotiate and lay down the law.

== Nicaragua and Iran-Contra ==
One of Baker's immediate priorities after his appointment was to reduce American involvement in Latin America, which had resulted in the Iran-Contra affair during the Reagan administration. Baker appointed Bernard Aronson, a Contra-supporting Democrat, to be his assistant secretary of state for Inter-American Affairs. Negotiating with House Speaker Jim Wright (D-TX) shortly after the election, Baker offered to stop requesting military funding for the Contra rebels, providing an off-ramp for American involvement in the conflict.

Aronson and Baker reoriented their position toward humanitarian, rather than military, aid for Nicaragua. Baker took the position that the administration would not assist the Contras, at least until the results of the 1990 election, when Sandinista incumbent Daniel Ortega would seek re-election. Partly as an olive branch to his Democratic partners, Baker worked with the Carter Center to ensure the election was run fairly.

In March 1989, Bush signed the Bipartisan Accord on Central America, which stated that the "Executive and the Congress are united on a policy to achieve" democratization, an end to intra-American subversion, and a reduction in Soviet influence. It also earmarked $4.5 million a month in humanitarian aid to the Contras through to the February 1990 election.

Baker ran afoul of some Republicans who supported the Contras' armed rebellion against Ortega's Sandinista government. Senator Jesse Helms (R-SC) in particular opposed Aronson as too dovish and inexperienced. Quayle's office also strongly opposed Baker's stance on Nicaragua, criticizing Aronson's appointment and providing intelligence that cast doubt on Baker's strategy.

In the 1990 Nicaraguan election, the Sandinista party was defeated by Violetta Chamorro. Chamorro was a relatively inexperienced consensus candidate for the anti-Sandinista UNO coalition, who successfully ran on ending the Contra-Sandinista war and American sanctions. Baker himself expected that Ortega would win out, but he and the Bush administration had strongly supported Chamorro's candidacy.

== The Soviet Union ==
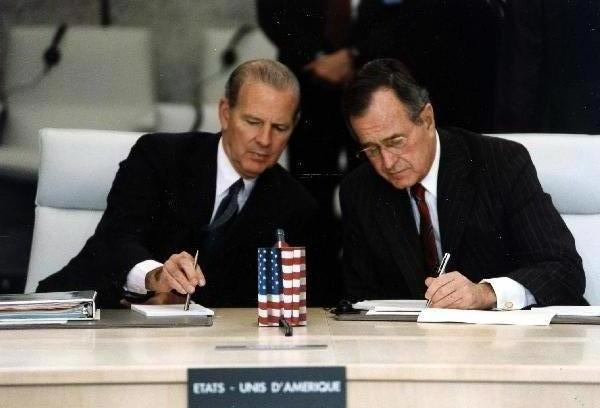
Baker with President George H. W. Bush at a Conference on Security and Co-operation in Europe (CSCE) on November 9, 1990

Baker also played a significant role in the administration's approach to the Soviet Union. Bush and Reagan had met together in December 1988 with Soviet premier Mikhail Gorbachev to continue warming relations between the countries, with Gorbachev announcing that he planned to withdraw hundreds of thousands of Soviet troops in Eastern Europe. Baker and Bush's immediate strategy was to "pause" détente while the Americans could reassess. Despite the Pause, events in the region throughout Baker's terms required greater involvement.

=== German reunification ===
Amidst the dissolution of the USSR, Baker participated extensively in the negotiations to reunify Germany following the 1989 fall of the Berlin Wall. Baker was the first American official to enter East Berlin after the Wall's destruction in December 1989. Vice President Quayle had intended to visit first, but Bush allowed Baker the honor over Quayle's objections. On his trip, Baker became the first and only Secretary of State to go into East Germany beyond Berlin, where he met with the East German premier Modrow and visited St. Nicholas Church. The US Ambassador to Germany in Bonn, Vernon Walters, strongly opposed the trip on the belief that it would bolster the communists, leading to Baker excluding him for the rest of German reunification negotiations.

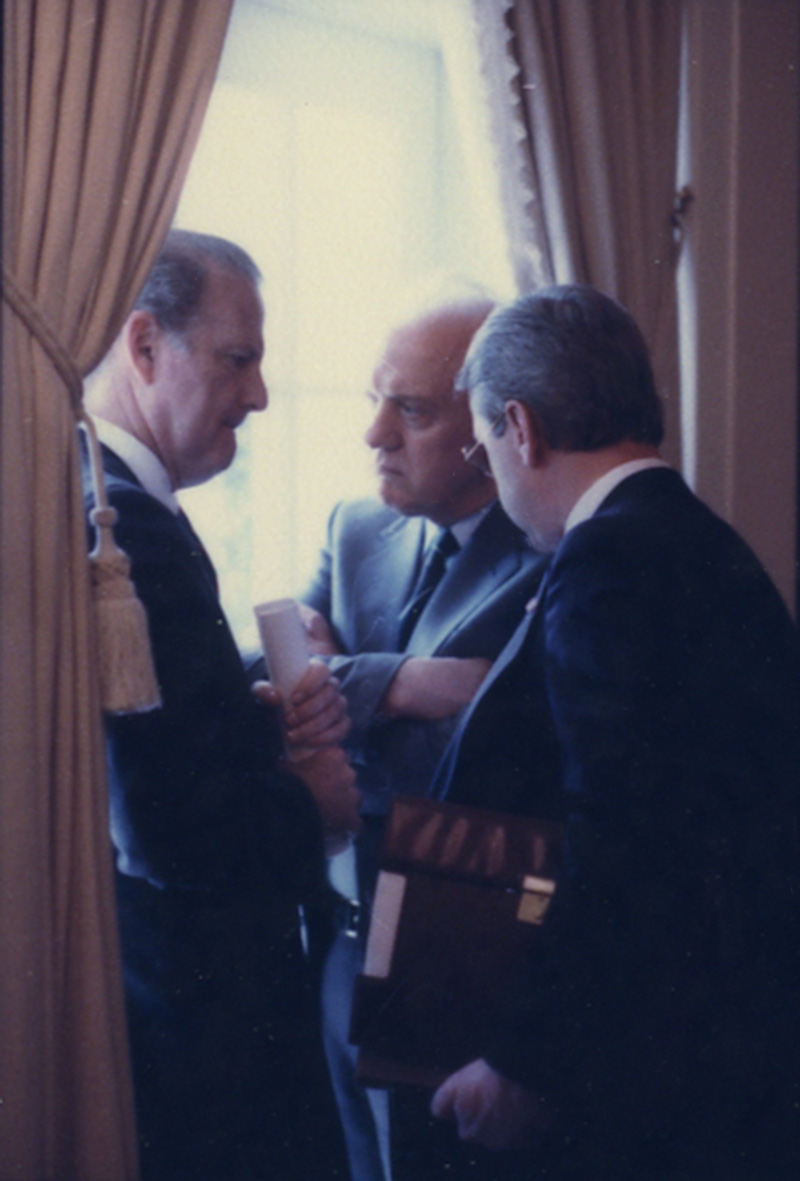
Baker (left) speaks with Soviet Foreign Minister Eduard Shevardnadze (center) in the White House Cabinet Room on June 1, 1990.

Baker, while primarily negotiating with the Soviets and West German Foreign Minister Hans-Dietrich Genscher, spoke of the Two Plus Four plan for German reunification. The framework, which, in September 1990, became the Treaty on the Final Settlement with Respect to Germany, emphasized the self-determination of the two partitioned parts of the German whole, with the assent of the Four Powers countries. The notion was drafted by Baker's State Department advisors, though it is disputed whether Francis Fukuyama or Dennis Ross was the prime mover. The plan was mildly distrusted by Bush and Scowcroft at the time, who worried about the speed of the change and whether West German Chancellor Helmut Kohl was completely on board. Baker created controversy when he negotiated with Gorbachev over the eastward expansion of NATO. In discussions with Gorbachev and Soviet Foreign Minister Eduard Shevardnadze, per a contemporaneous memo, Baker said that:

There would be no extension of NATO’s jurisdiction for forces of NATO one inch to the east.

Given that a unified Germany would naturally result in either NATO's expulsion of West Germany (which had been a member since 1955) or an eastward expansion of NATO's jurisdiction, the promise taken literally would be untenable in the context of German reunification. Some in the Bush administration cautioned Baker, but Baker indicated that he had only meant that NATO would not add new members in Eastern Europe. The record is conflicted on exactly what Baker meant and how what he said was understood at the time, but Russian President Vladimir Putin, among others, have labeled it as one of multiple instances where NATO and the US allegedly misled Russo-Soviet stakeholders into reducing their share of geopolitical power.

After Russia invaded the Crimean Peninsula in 2014, Gorbachev defended Baker's comments, insisting that they should not be taken as a broken promise. He said that NATO expansion was not considered relevant during the discussions in 1989 and that "everything that could have been and needed to be done to solidify that political obligation was done." Gorbachev instead dated NATO's expansion eastward to 1993 and said it did not connect to previous promises. The final Two Plus Four agreement was signed in September 1990, paving the way for a unified Germany by March 1991.

=== Soviet dissolution ===
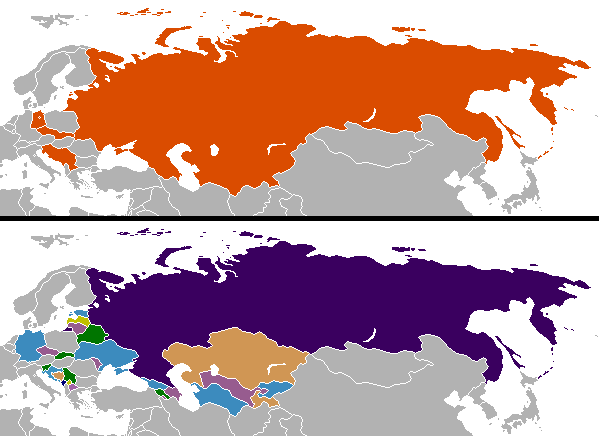
Changes in internationally recognized boundaries of countries after the end of the Cold War. Orange in the "before" map represents the territories as of 1991, which were affected.

Over the course of Baker's term, Soviet member states individually staged revolutions and made declarations of independence. When his tenure ended in 1992, the Soviet Union had completely shifted from one large communist state into 15 different democratic republics, with satellite states (e.g., Poland, Romania) also departing Soviet orbit through the sunset of the Warsaw Pact.

Baker visited multiple former Soviet countries and satellites during this upheaval. He made official stops in Ukraine, Albania, Yugoslavia, Poland, Latvia, Estonia, Lithuania, Czechoslovakia, Bulgaria, Romania, Georgia, Hungary, Kazakhstan, Turkmenistan, Azerbaijan, Armenia, Tajikistan, Moldova, Belarus, and Russia. Over his term, he visited every country that had been party to the Warsaw Pact.

Throughout Baker's tenure as Secretary of State, the Soviets repeatedly attempted to suppress secessionist movements. Bush and Baker supported some of the interventions as necessary for law and order. Baker had told Shevardnadze in July 1989 that the US appreciated that the military might be needed to suppress "irrational bloodletting and national hatreds." The administration therefore "completely" supported Soviet suppression of Azeri Popular Front demonstrators in Baku, as Bush told Soviet diplomat Yuri Dubinin in January 1990.

The US had a stronger response to Soviet crackdowns in Lithuania, which voted for independence in March 1990. Baker warned Shevardnadze that—while the administration had restrained its criticism—should the Soviets use force, its public statements would become less subdued. Against Bush and Baker's wishes, more than a third of the US Senate unsuccessfully supported recognizing an independent Lithuania. Conservative figures like William Safire, Evans & Novak, and Senator Jesse Helms all publicly criticized Bush and Baker's conciliatory approach.

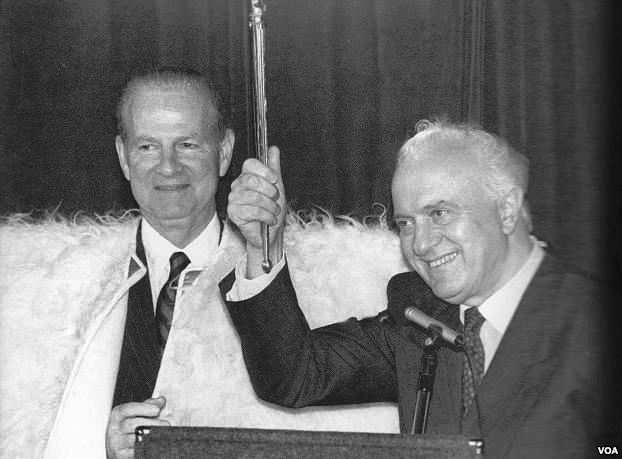
Baker (left) meets with Georgia's first post-independence president Eduard Shevardnadze in Tbilisi in 1992.

In April, Baker attempted to mediate the conflict, separately pressing both Shevardnadze—by threatening a proposed trade agreement and the START treaty—and Lithuanian independence leader Vytautas Landsbergis. The other Baltic republics joined Lithuania in resisting Soviet occupation that summer, but Baker and Bush maintained focus on bilateral issues like arms reduction, German reunification, and economic revitalization.

When the Soviet Armed Forces confronted democracy protestors in Lithuania's capital in the so-called "Vilnius Massacre," Baker warned his counterpart that the escalation could bring "consequences," but the focus on the Gulf War prevented those consequences from materializing.

As the Soviet Union completely dissolved, Baker was a voice for caution in the administration. Against anti-Soviet hardliners like Cheney and Quayle, who wanted the US to expedite Soviet disintegration, Baker worried that independent states would become "another Yugoslavia." Baker felt that rash action or proactive support would only help "radicals," that risk of "chaos & civil war" would increase. Despite his reservations, Baker declared in December 1991—shortly after the Belovezha Accords— that "the Soviet Union as we've known it no longer exists."

=== The Balkan peninsula ===
Baker was the first senior US representative to officially visit Albania, in June 1991. Approximately 300,000 Albanians evinced pro-American enthusiasm as Baker spoke in Tirana's Skanderbeg Square. In the speech, Baker spoke in favor of Albania's post-Soviet reintegration into the world system.

On the same trip, Baker visited Belgrade, the capital of Yugoslavia, to meet with Serb nationalist Slobodan Milosevic. Three days after he departed, Croatia and Slovenia declared independence from Yugoslavia, plunging the country into what would become a decade of intermittent war. Baker felt that even should the Balkans enter a state of war, the region bore little importance to US foreign policy interests. To that point, he was quoted as saying that the US does not have "a dog in that fight." This disposition was received by Milosevic as a correct assumption that he had a free-hand for domestic repression without intervention by the Bush administration.

=== Ukraine ===
Beyond the Balkans, Baker also shaped the administration's approach to Ukrainian independence. Soviet stakeholders felt that Ukraine's departure would be especially harmful, given its size and cultural history. Despite popular nationalist sentiment among the vast majority of Ukrainians, Baker said that the administration was "nervous" about Ukrainian secession due to their productive relationship with Gorbachev. Bush therefore spoke in Ukraine's capital city to denounce "those who promote a suicidal nationalism based upon ethnic hatred." The speech would be derided by columnist William Safire as the "Chicken Kiev" speech, reflecting Baker and Bush's skittish approach toward the newly fractured Soviet ecosystem.

== Iraq and the 1991 Gulf War ==
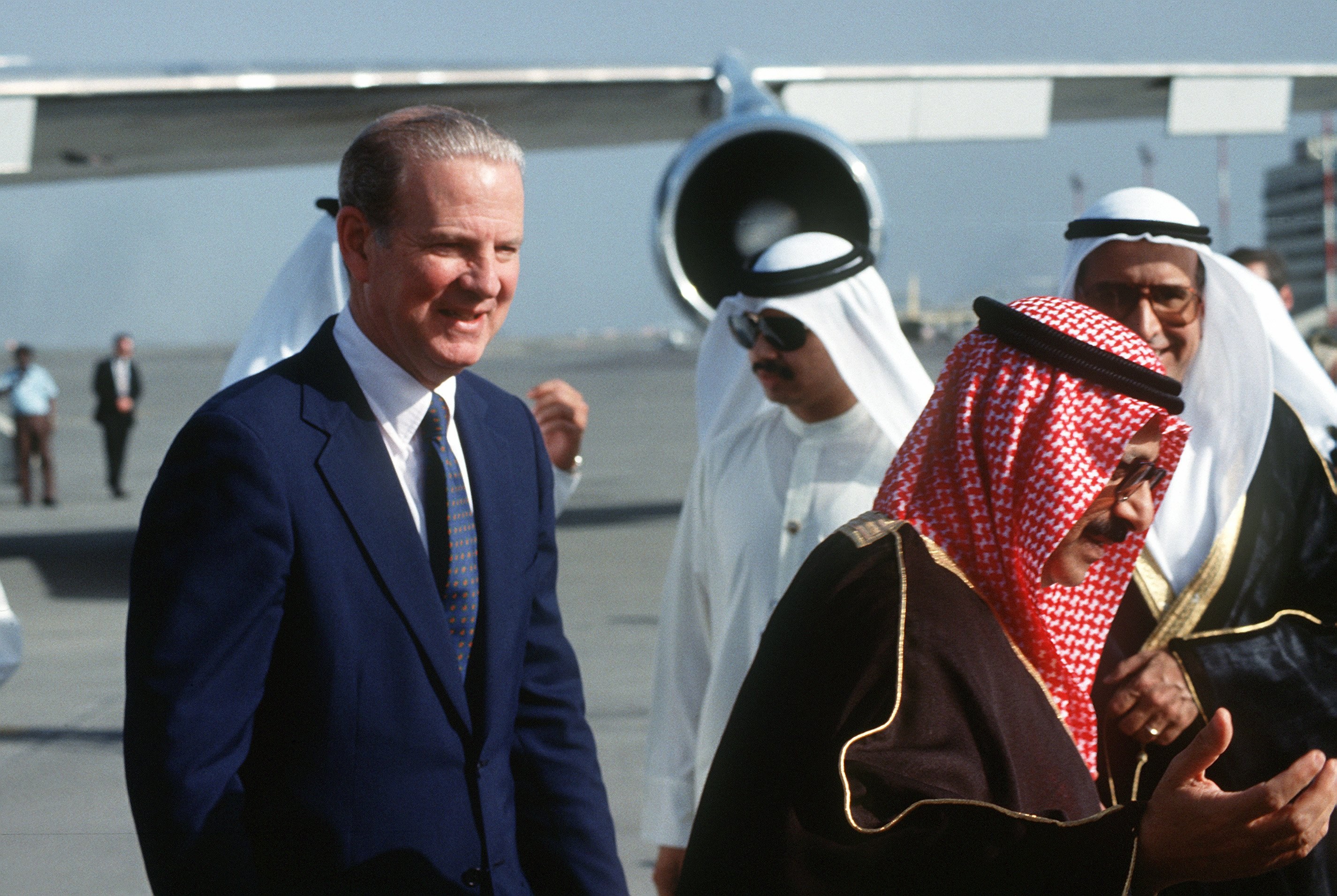
Baker arrives at Kuwait International Airport on April 22, 1991, following the successful end of the First Gulf War.

Throughout 1990, Iraqi President Saddam Hussein repeatedly agitated against its eastern neighbor, Kuwait. Iraq stationed members of its Republican Guard on the border, and Hussein frequently and publicly condemned Kuwait for what he considered economic aggression. At the time, the American foreign policy apparatus was more concerned with German reunification and the changing shape of Europe, meaning that, as Baker admitted, the US was blindsided.

Days before the invasion, Assistant Secretary of State John Kelly told a subcommittee that the U.S. would have no obligation to Kuwait if Iraq invaded, potentially giving Hussein a signal of American ambivalence. On July 25, when Hussein summoned American Ambassador to Iraq April Glaspie, she discouraged Iraq's adventurism on the border, but allegedly gave the impression that the US would not involve itself in "Arab-Arab" disputes beyond its national interest. Though Glaspie did not receive specific instructions for the impromptu meeting, a previous July 24 cable from Baker laid out American policy:

While we take no position on the border delineation issue raised by Iraq with respect to Kuwait, or on other bilateral disputes, Iraqi statements suggest an intention to resolve outstanding disagreements by the use of force, an approach which is contrary to U.N. charter principles. The implications of having oil production and pricing policy in the Gulf determined and enforced by Iraqi guns are disturbing.

Saddam Hussein's forces invaded Kuwait on August 2, 1990. Baker was with Soviet foreign minister Shevardnadze at the time of the early reports. Though the Soviets were long-time supporters of Iraq and Hussein in the proxy conflicts of the Cold War and though both men originally doubted the reports' severity, the two ministers released a joint statement condemning the invasion and calling for the involvement of the UN Security Council.

In administration planning sessions, Baker was more dovish than the president and some advisors. Bush wrote at the time that Baker was most concerned with avoiding "another Vietnam." When an Iraqi oil tanker apparently broke the American-enforced embargo, Cheney, Scowcroft, and some allies—including Margaret Thatcher—strongly felt that the US should destroy or detain the ship. Baker convinced Bush that they should not escalate beyond firing warning shots. Besides concerns about the potential chaos from a full-blown war, Baker and Bush also operated off the Soviet feeling, expressed by Shevardnadze, that overt American aggression could jeopardize a more collaborative response.

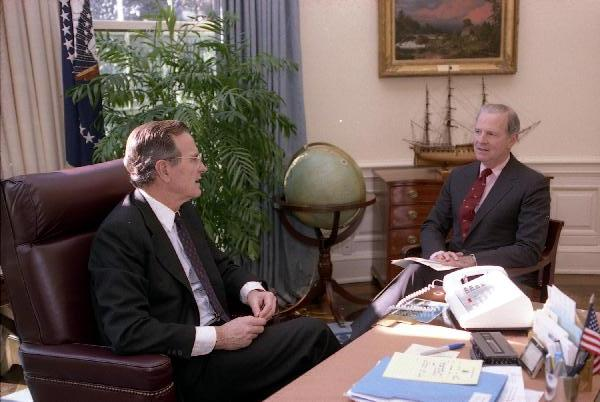
Secretary of State James Baker with President George H.W. Bush in the Oval Office of the White House on January 4, 1991

Following the invasion, Baker spent much of the late summer and autumn traveling to countries to encourage both political and financial support for military intervention to stop Hussein. Travelling 100,000 miles over ten weeks, Baker visited the Soviet Union, the United Kingdom, France, Bahrain, Turkey, Egypt, and Saudi Arabia.

When in Cairo, Baker also covertly met with the Chinese foreign minister Qian Qichen. Baker promised that if China did not torpedo the coalition plan with their UN Security Council veto, he would arrange a meeting in Washington to end the American diplomatic ice-out in the wake of the 1989 Tiananmen Square massacre. Baker originally understood Qichen's response to be agreement to vote for it, and tried to renege on his deal when China abstained on the UNSC vote.

In November 1990, the UN Security Council resolved that if Iraq did not revert to the internationally recognized boundaries by January 15, 1990, Kuwait's allies could use "all necessary means" to ensure compliance. Baker personally occupied the American seat at the UN to communicate their commitment to a multilateral response. Baker equated the opposition to the UN plan with Nazi appeasement, arguing that deciding not to intervene would result in the UN ending in ignominy as the League of Nations had. China declined to either support or reject the plan while Cuba and Yemen voted no, but all of the other 12 Security Council members supported the coalition. Yemen's no vote came amidst American threats that it was the "most expensive vote [the country] ever cast," resulting in the cut-off of $70 million in American aid and the expulsion of Yemeni emigrants in Saudi Arabia.

Despite the license to intervene, Bush asked Baker to negotiate with Iraq further to avoid the use of force. Baker eventually met with Iraqi Foreign Minister Tariq Aziz in Switzerland, less than a week before the January 15 deadline. The meeting ruffled some feathers, with Saudi ambassador Bandar and NSC chief Scowcroft feeling that the UN resolution meant the end of negotiation. In the six-hour discussion, Aziz refused to engage with Baker's entreaties. Baker implied that, should Iraq refuse to withdraw, a coalition response could result in significant Iraqi losses and the end of the Hussein regime through popular uprising. Baker also explicitly cautioned that any use of chemical or biological weapons would escalate the conflict to the point where Americans would insist on the total "elimination of the current regime." Baker later acknowledged that he intended to threaten a retaliatory nuclear strike on Iraq,

The Bush administration sought Congressional approval for the invasion, though some administration officials, including Cheney, Chief of Staff John Sununu, and White House Counsel Boyden Gray, argued that it offered little upside. Baker himself supported seeking Congress's imprimatur, feeling that it would increase Iraq's willingness to withdraw without the use of force.

The coalition began bombing Iraq on January 17, one day after the deadline for withdrawal had passed. Soon after British, French, American, Saudi, Egyptian, and Kuwaiti airplanes bombed the country, Iraq launched SCUD missiles at Israel, killing thirteen people. Though Israel demanded that it be allowed to partake, Baker refused to allow them access, overruling the view of Cheney, Scowcroft, and others. Baker felt that any focus on Israel would strain the coalition, especially Arab members that strongly supported Palestine. Israeli Defense Minister Moshe Arens, who traveled to Washington in the midst of the offensive to seek inclusion, characterized Baker as entirely unsympathetic.

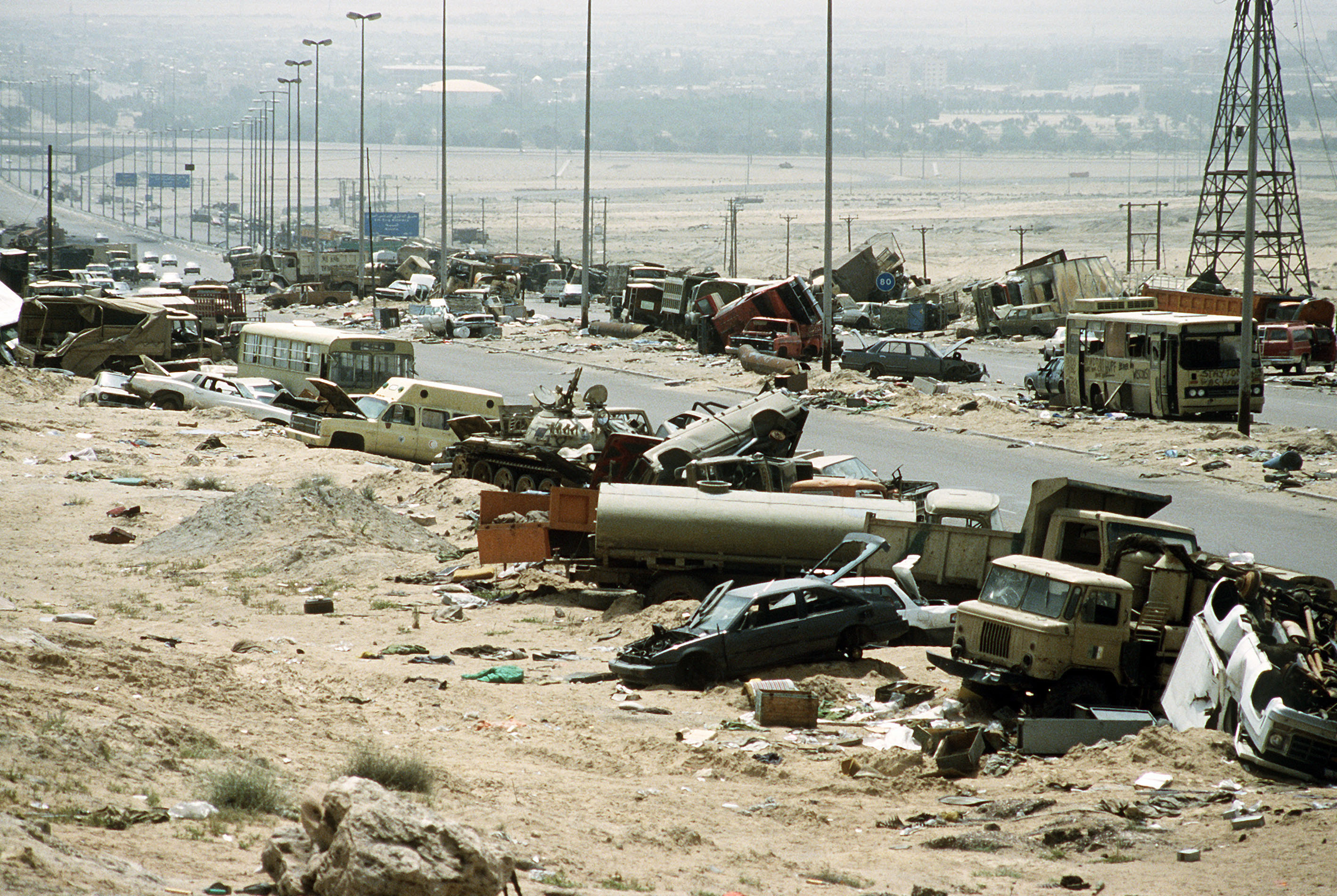
Demolished vehicles line Highway 80, also known as the "Highway of Death", the route fleeing Iraqi forces took as they retreated from Kuwait.

The air offensive continued for multiple weeks. Bush's senior advisors set a new deadline (February 24) for withdrawal on February 21 before the coalition would launch a ground offensive. Though Cheney, Quayle, Colin Powell and others strongly supported the ultimatum, Baker offered lukewarm support, worrying about how allies would respond.

The ground offensive officially began on February 24 and ended on February 28, when the Iraqi troops fled from Kuwait via the "highway of death." Concerned about mission creep and the prospects for a larger-scale conflict, Baker and most of Bush's advisors agreed that there was no value in continuing the offensive following Iraq's withdrawal.

Given the Second Gulf War, which began 12 years later and focused on the capture of Saddam Hussein, there has been some conflicting perspective on the role regime change played in the approach to the First Gulf War. The coalition did not proceed to the capital or attack Hussein's forces further following the withdrawal, but over the course of the offensive, Baker, Cheney, and Bush all indicated that they would welcome a movement by the Iraqi people to depose Hussein. Despite the encouragement, in the ceasefire talks, the Americans allowed Hussein to continue using military equipment that he then used to suppress popular uprisings in the Shiite South and Kurdish North.

Baker's personal approval rating rose shortly after the successful ground offensive to 84 percent. Baker's insistence on international burden-sharing was considered a key element of the war's quick end, and 41 percent of people polled by Gallup said that Baker should replace Quayle on the 1992 presidential ticket. Beyond the political support for the war, Baker also managed to coordinate financial support from the various involved countries so that their funds of $53.7 billion offset the $61.1 billion that the US had allocated to the effort.

=== Criticism of conduct during the Gulf War ===
Though Baker and Bush earned praise for the coalition forces' triumph, Baker also made missteps criticized by allies and the press throughout the process. Immediately following the invasion, Baker was castigated for seeming to blame Ambassador Glaspie for insufficiently discouraging Hussein. Though Glaspie was operating on advice from a cable signed by Baker from a day before she spoke with Hussein, Baker refused responsibility for Glaspie's approach and claimed on Meet the Press that there were "312,000" such cables under his name. As interviewer Johnny Apple put it to Baker, "nobody's trying to criticize April Glaspie. They're trying to criticize you."

In a column shortly after that appearance, Washington Post columnist Michael Kinsley wrote that—like British Foreign Secretary Peter Carrington following the unexpected Argentine invasion of the Malvinas Islands—Baker should resign. Kinsley derided both Baker's deflection of blame and his "damage-control campaign, [which is] both contemptible and hilarious."

In the lead-up to the invasion, Baker also caused a minor fracas when he commented about the importance of the offensive for maintaining US economic growth. He spoke about the intent behind the war at a news conference in Bermuda, saying:

To bring [the war] down to the average American citizen, let me say that means jobs. If you want to sum it up in one word, it’s jobs. Because an economic recession worldwide caused by the control of one nation, one dictator, if you will, of the West’s economic lifeline will result in the loss of jobs on the part of American citizens.

Reporters labelled it Baker's "jobs, jobs, jobs" speech. The comments tarnished the diplomatic effort as a matter of mere commerce, causing some tension between Baker and the White House.

At the beginning of February, shortly into the air offensive, Baker also made the mistake of signing onto a bilateral statement with the Soviet foreign minister Alexander Bessmertnykh that implied Iraq could end the war without a formal withdrawal. Bush was furious at what he felt was a mistake that undermined administration policy. White House Chief of Staff John Sununu reportedly summarized his feeling, saying that "Baker bends over backward to please the Soviets and now the Soviets are bending over backward to help Saddam." Former President Richard Nixon, then out of public life, privately said that he thought Bush should fire Baker for the misstep.

== Arab-Israeli conflict ==
In the midst of extensive conflict in the region following the Israeli invasion of Lebanon and the First Intifada, Baker's predecessor George Shultz worked to shift the focus of American negotiation from Israel's Arab neighbors to the Palestinian Liberation Organization. Though Shultz did not succeed in resolving the conflict, he became the first US representative to officially recognize the PLO.

Baker himself approached the conflict with trepidation. At the beginning of his tenure, he told his advisor Dennis Ross that he did not want to be "fly[ing] around the Middle East like George Shultz had done." Baker also felt that his foreign policy focus belonged in Europe with the Soviet Union.

Despite the sense of caution, Baker did speak on issues involved in the Israel-Palestine conflict. In May 1989, he spoke at the annual conference of the American Israel Public Affairs Committee where he said:

For Israel, now is the time to lay aside, once and for all, the unrealistic vision of a Greater Israel. Israeli interests in the West Bank and Gaza, security and otherwise, can be accommodated in a settlement based on UN Resolution 242. Foreswear annexation; stop settlement activity; allow schools to reopen; reach out to the Palestinians as neighbors who deserve political rights.

According to Ross, who drafted the speech with Harvey Sicherman, Baker took out multiple positive remarks about Israel and its relationship with the U.S., feeling that they were too pandering.

After the American-Israeli deference of the Schultz era, political figures responded to the apparent change in tone. Israeli premier Yitzhak Shamir took personal offense at the comments and said that it reflected a poor understanding of the dynamics at play. Yitzhak Rabin, then the Israeli Defense Minister, argued that Baker should have directed his critique to the Palestinians, rather than the Israelis. Bush privately encouraged Baker for having the courage of his convictions and former American president Richard Nixon congratulated Baker on his speech.

The logo for the American Israel Public Affairs Committee, where Baker criticized Israel's alleged expansionism in a 1989 keynote speech

Shortly after Shamir convened a new, more right-leaning government in June 1990, Baker again criticized Israeli leadership for insufficient interest in peace. Speaking before the House Foreign Affairs Committee, Baker said that he sought to construct a lasting peace. He also provided the public telephone number for the administration and claimed that the Israelis should call only "when [they] are serious about peace."

In the wake of those comments, Deputy Foreign Affairs Minister Benjamin Netanyahu publicly claimed that the American policy was based on "distortion and lies," angering Baker. In response, Baker barred Netanyahu from the State Department building, over the strong objections of some of Baker's subordinates. According to Ross's deputy William Burns, when they requested he reconsider, "Baker would just smile and say nope." Though he eventually allowed Netanyahu to enter the building to meet with junior officials, he refused to meet with him again during his tenure.

=== Zalman Shoval incident ===
The friction between Baker and Israeli officials grew in the midst of the Gulf War, when the Bush administration ultimately opposed allowing Israel to retaliate against Iraqi missile attacks. In a Reuters interview the following month, Israel's US Ambassador Zalman Shoval publicly complained about the administration giving his country "the runaround" on funding for Soviet Jewish resettlement. Baker personally confronted Shoval, extracted a public apology for the remarks, and privately wrote to Israeli Prime Minister Yitzhak Shamir warning that future public rebukes would result in Shoval's expulsion. At the time, Shoval maintained that the comments were meant to be on the record, though his supporters later claimed the reporter misrepresented him.

Israeli Defense Minister Moshe Arens—who had personally traveled to Washington to unsuccessfully request Baker's permission for retaliatory strikes against Iraq—recounted his colleagues' surprise at Baker's approach toward Israeli officials. In comments to Baker's biographers, Arens claimed that:

This Bush-Baker move against Israel's ambassador had, to the best of my knowledge, no precedent in modern diplomatic history. Never had an ambassador of a friendly country been publicly castigated in such manner in Washington, and this during a war in which we were supposed to be allies.

=== Madrid Conference ===
At a September 1990 meeting between the US and the Soviet Union meant to coordinate a response to Iraq's invasion of Kuwait, Bush told Gorbachev that he would look into a Middle East peace conference to resolve the Israel-Palestine conflict. Baker, who had rejected a similar entreaty from Shevardnadze, and his advisors strongly discouraged linking Hussein's aggression with the Palestinian cause.

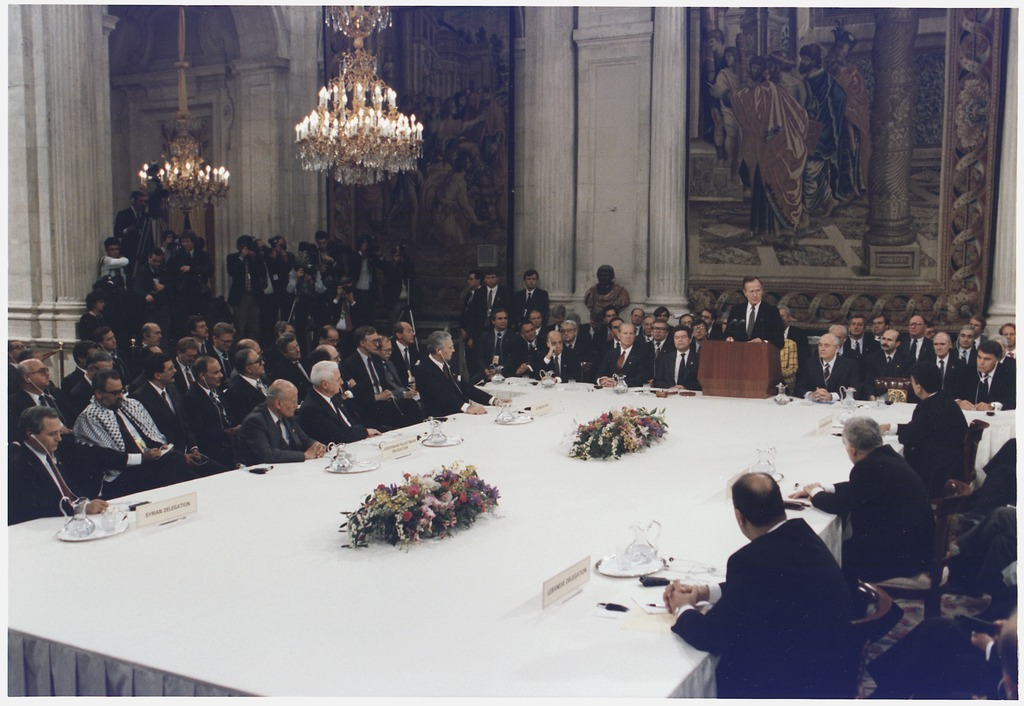
President Bush addresses the Middle East Peace Conference at the Royal Palace in Madrid, Spain.

In further discussions with Gorbachev, Baker successfully removed the issue from the negotiating table. Instead, he privately promised the Soviet premier that they would have a peace conference after Iraq had been subdued.

Following the coalition victory in the Gulf War, Baker became the first American Secretary of State to negotiate directly and officially with Palestinians in the multilateral Madrid Conference of 1991, which was the first comprehensive peace conference that involved every party involved in the Arab-Israeli conflict and the conference was designed to address all outstanding issues.

The Soviet and Arab delegations wanted Madrid to be a large international conference, but Israel wanted only a direct bilateral negotiation to avoid being outnumbered by countries that preferred Palestine. Baker arranged a smaller multi-party negotiation between Israel, Palestine, and its three neighbors.

Israel conditioned its participation on multiple mitigations to Palestinian unity. Shamir required that Palestine engage as a joint delegation with Jordan, that no Palestinians from disputed East Jerusalem participate, and that no members of the Palestinian Liberation Organization be allowed to represent Palestine. Shamir also tried to require that all Palestinian participants explicitly condemn the PLO, but Baker denied the request.

The Palestinian delegation tried to exert its own conditions, that they be allowed to include an East Jerusalem resident and that Israel halt settlement construction during the negotiations Baker threatened to exclude the Palestinians if they did not drop their requests.

In a decades-later recollection, American Ambassador to Israel William Andreas Brown said that the Americans viewed the Palestinian delegation as "crybabies," overly reliant on the excluded PLO head, Yasser Arafat. Baker and his team thus focused on only minor improvements in relations between the parties.

When Shevardnadze spoke to Baker and his aides months before Madrid, they had unfavorable things to say about the PLO's negotiating position. Baker commented that Arafat had seriously hurt the odds for a two-state solution, Ross said that Arafat was on the "losing side" where "people don't get rewarded," and an unnamed aide cursed out Arafat and the PLO.

==== NY Post quote ====
In March 1992, New York City Mayor Ed Koch claimed in his weekly column that Baker had dismissed Jewish voters, quoting him as saying, "F—’em. They [the Jews] don't vote for us." Baker denied this quote, which Koch heard second-hand from cabinet-member Jack Kemp, as a misrepresentation. He claimed that he was specifically referring to AIPAC—an agenda-based advocacy group that had criticized Baker, not individual constituents. Kemp's version of the quote, relayed to Baker's biographers, omitted any expletive, but said it came after Kemp mentioned campaigning for Bush to Jewish voters.

Baker and Kemp had had previous heated disputes, stemming in part from Kemp's assumption of a foreign policy role. After Kemp—as the Housing and Urban Development secretary—told Baker he was wrong on an overly cautious approach to Lithuania, Baker cursed him out in the Oval Office in front of Bush and other advisors. Kemp followed Baker out and continued a loud argument until NSC Chair Brent Scowcroft intervened. According to Robert Gates, the two men were on the verge of a "fistfight" at the time, though Kemp later apologized to Baker.

== Departure ==
Baker officially left the State Department on August 23, 1992. He departed to run Bush's re-election campaign as White House Chief of Staff, a role he had held during the Reagan administration. Given his success as campaign manager during Bush's 1988 campaign and as Chief of Staff during Reagan's 1984 re-election, reporters frequently speculated about his return. Baker resisted the shift, feeling that it degraded his prestige as secretary of state and resenting that he would have to undergo a Senate confirmation hearing again should Bush win re-election. Lawrence Eagleburger, who served as Baker's deputy, was the acting secretary of state from August until he officially assumed the role after a recess appointment in December.
