= Washington Summit =

Washington Summit may refer to:

- Washington Summit (1973)
- Washington Summit (1987)
- Washington Summit (1990)

== NATO summit ==
- 1978 Washington summit
- 1999 Washington summit
- 2024 Washington summit
