= Howard Morgan =

Howard Morgan may refer to:

- Howard Morgan, American police officer shot 28 times by four Chicago police officers, see Howard Morgan case
- Howard Morgan (weather forecaster), American retired weather forecaster
- Howard Morgan (cricketer) (born 1931), former Welsh cricketer
- Howard J. Morgan (1949–2020), British portrait painter
- Howard L. Morgan (born 1945), American venture capitalist, philanthropist and writer
