= 2024 Washington NATO summit =

NATO diplomatic conference in Washington, DC

NATO Summit Washington 2024 75 Washington D.C. Summit•Sommet
- Host country: United States
- Date: 9–11 July 2024
- Cities: Washington, D.C.
- Venues: Walter E. Washington Convention Center
- Follows: 2023 Vilnius summit
- Precedes: 2025 The Hague summit

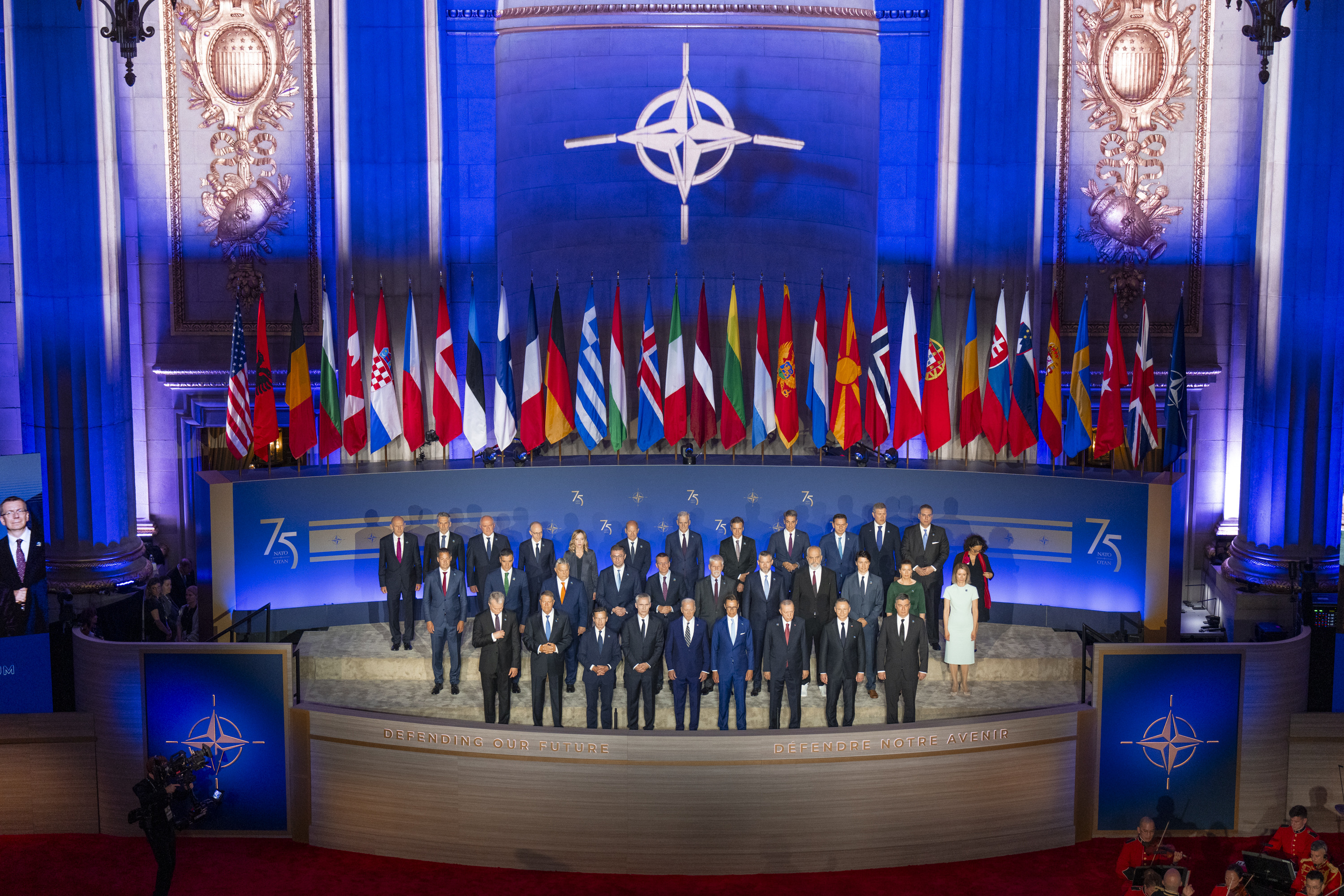
For the first time, a photo at the Washington summit captures all 32 NATO member states' delegation groups together (9th of July 2024)

The 2024 Washington summit was the summit of the heads of state and government of the thirty-two members of the North Atlantic Treaty Organization (NATO), their partner countries and the European Union (EU), which took place in Washington, D.C., United States, on 9–11 July 2024. The summit commemorates the landmark 75th anniversary of NATO, which was founded on 4 April 1949 with the signing of the North Atlantic Treaty in Washington, DC. The summit was also the fourth NATO summit to be held in the United States following the 1978 Washington summit, 1999 Washington summit and 2012 Chicago summit. It also marks the first summit since Sweden acceded to NATO and the last for Jens Stoltenberg as Secretary General.

== Background ==
The official title of the 2024 Washington summit is "Ukraine and transatlantic security." It is meant to highlight the focus on NATO's response to escalating global threats to peace and democracies, with particular attention to Russia's ongoing invasion of Ukraine and North Korea's involvement on the side of Russia through weapon supply and troop deployment to the Ukrainian front lines. Following the announcement of Russian and North Korean cooperation agreements, Stoltenberg stated that Ukraine-South Korea cooperation would be discussed at the summit. The alliance is also set to discuss perceived threats posed by China and the security situation in the Indo-Pacific region. Additionally, agenda includes dialog on boosting defence production and reaffirming allies' commitment to military readiness and the defence of all of NATO's territory.

=== Expectations ===
At an Atlantic Council event, US permanent representative to NATO Julianne Smith indicated that NATO was not ready to extend a formal invitation to Ukraine for membership during the previous year's summit in Vilnius and is unlikely to do so at the upcoming Washington summit. Instead, she expects NATO allies to provide Ukraine with a "deliverable" that would bring the country closer to membership, focusing on institutionalizing the bilateral support that has grown over the past two years. While details on this deliverable remain unclear, Smith emphasized NATO's ongoing commitment to Ukraine through measures like the NATO-Ukraine Council, established at the 2023 NATO summit.

On 27 June 2024, the President of Ukraine Volodymyr Zelenskyy visited NATO Headquarters, where NATO Secretary General Jens Stoltenberg welcomed him to discuss the final preparations for the Washington Summit. Stoltenberg stated that he expects NATO Allies to agree on NATO taking the lead in the coordination and provision of security assistance and training for Ukraine. He also proposed a long-term financial pledge to provide Ukraine with greater predictability in the support it receives.

A week before the summit, NATO Director of Policy Planning, Benedetta Berti, anticipated new commitments to invest in the "deterrence and defense architecture" of the alliance, a greater role in training and assistance for Ukraine, as well as a restatement to eventually add Ukraine into NATO, and stronger ties with Japan, Australia, the Republic of Korea, and New Zealand.

=== Pre-summit developments ===
==== 2024 Ukrainian mobilization law ====
Despite a controversial mobilization law passed in 2024, which lowered the mobilization age from 27 to 25, Ukraine still faces a severe manpower shortage. With a population of 144 million people, Russia significantly outnumbered Ukraine's 38 million in 2022. This demographic advantage gives Russia greater manpower resources. However, Russian losses in the war are generally considered higher than Ukraine's. Both have lost significant amounts of personnel, though no precise numbers can be given until after the invasion and when all cases are investigated.

==== International support for Ukraine ====
On 14 May 2024, United States Secretary of State Antony Blinken arrived to Kyiv announced to reaffirm the support of his country, less than a month after Congress approved a $60 billion aid package. With expedited delivery of military assistance, including artillery and air defence systems, the trip underscored the Biden administration's commitment to Ukraine's long-term security amidst escalating conflict. Blinken stated, "We are with you today. And we will stay by your side until Ukraine's security, sovereignty, its ability to choose its own path is guaranteed."

On the morning of 24 May, Hungarian Prime Minister Viktor Orbán said in a broadcast on Magyar Rádió that his government planned to redefine Hungary's NATO membership "without taking part in NATO operations outside NATO territory" due to his stance on foreign aid to Ukraine. Orbán is the only leader of any EU and NATO member state who, despite united efforts by both blocs to support Ukraine economically, militarily and politically, continues to maintain close ties with Russian President Vladimir Putin. Earlier in January, the EU threatened to impose voting sanctions on Hungary and permanently cut off its funding if Orbán's government continued to veto a €50 billion (approximately US$54 billion) aid package for Ukraine. This resulted in Hungary dropping its veto and a successful EU agreement on such aid.

On 27 June 2024, Ukraine and EU signed a historic security deal, which set out the commitment of all 27 member states to aid Ukraine with extensive support, regardless of any internal institutional changes, according to the Ukrainian President Zelenskyy. On the same day 2 similar deals were signed with Lithuania and Estonia. Ukraine has already signed 19 similar bilateral security agreements, including with the United States, France and the UK. These agreements, while not mutual defence pacts, signify strategic partnerships aimed at bolstering Ukraine's stability and security amidst ongoing regional challenges.

==== Relations with Russia ====
On 24 May 2024, the State Department announced that Secretary of State Antony Blinken would visit Eastern Europe amidst escalating concerns over Russia's advances in Ukraine as it opened a new northern front with an attack on the Kharkiv region, potential Russian interference in Moldova, and Georgian protests against a proposed "foreign agent" bill similar to that adopted in Russia. Blinken visited Chişinau on 29 May and Prague on 30 and 31 May. He met Czech Foreign Minister Jan Lipavský and other officials to deliberate on support for Ukraine, alongside the Georgian "foreign agent" bill.

==== Weapon use policy changes ====
On 3 May, during a visit to Kyiv, UK Foreign Secretary David Cameron said that Ukraine had the decision as to how it would use British weapons and the right to strike with them inside Russia. This was a major policy change on the part of the United Kingdom, a nuclear state and key NATO member. Kremlin Press Secretary Dmitry Peskov and the spokeswoman for Ministry of Foreign Affairs Maria Zakharova condemned the decision. On 29 May, representatives of Finland, Canada and Poland issued separate statements saying that Ukraine can strike valid military targets inside Russia using their weapons.

By the end of May, several leaders had also endorsed lifting the concurrent ban on Western-supplied weapons, including presidents Emmanuel Macron of France, Edgars Rinkēvičs of Latvia and Alar Karis of Estonia; German Chancellor Olaf Scholz; and prime ministers Alexander De Croo of Belgium, Petr Fiala of the Czech Republic and Mette Frederiksen of Denmark, as well as the foreign ministers of Canada, Lithuania, Norway, the United Kingdom and Poland; and the defence ministers of Finland, the Netherlands and Sweden. Conversely, Belgium and Italy were against the use of Western-supplied weapons by Ukraine to strike targets within Russia.

On 30 May, US President Joe Biden implicitly gave Ukraine permission to strike inside Russia, but only near the Kharkiv Oblast, with no exact borderlines defined. The decision came after Ukrainian President Volodymyr Zelenskyy and other officials urged their allies to allow Ukraine to strike inside Russia with Western-supplied weapons in response to the daily bombings of Ukrainian cities by Russian forces from military bases located inside Russia. Shortly after the US lifted these restrictions, the German government gave permission for Ukraine to use its weapons inside Russia. This came with a "just over the border" striking policy limited to Kharkiv Oblast, where Russia launched an offensive and made tactical gains.

On 20 June 2024, facing pressure from Ukraine and its European allies, and in response to the North Korea-Russia mutual defence pact, the United States authorised Ukraine to use American-supplied weapons against Russian forces across the border, extending beyond the region near Kharkiv. This decision facilitated successful Ukrainian military operations that included strikes into Russian territory. Ukrainian officials have subsequently advocated for the lifting of restrictions on long-range missile systems such as the ATACMS, which Ukraine was currently not allowed to use on Russian territory.

On 19 June 2024, North Korea and Russia signed a mutual defence agreement during Vladimir Putin's first visit to Pyongyang in 24 years. This event has been marked as a major escalation of tensions on the Korean Peninsula. In response, South Korea summoned Russian Ambassador Georgy Zinoviev to protest the deal. On 20 June, South Korean national security adviser Chang Ho-jin stated, "We will reconsider the issue of supplying weapons to Ukraine." This statement was also marked an unprecedented change in South Korea's strict military doctrine, which traditionally prohibits sending arms to countries engaged in active military conflicts. Putin warned that it would be a "big mistake" if South Korea arms Ukraine.

==== Member state defence spending ====
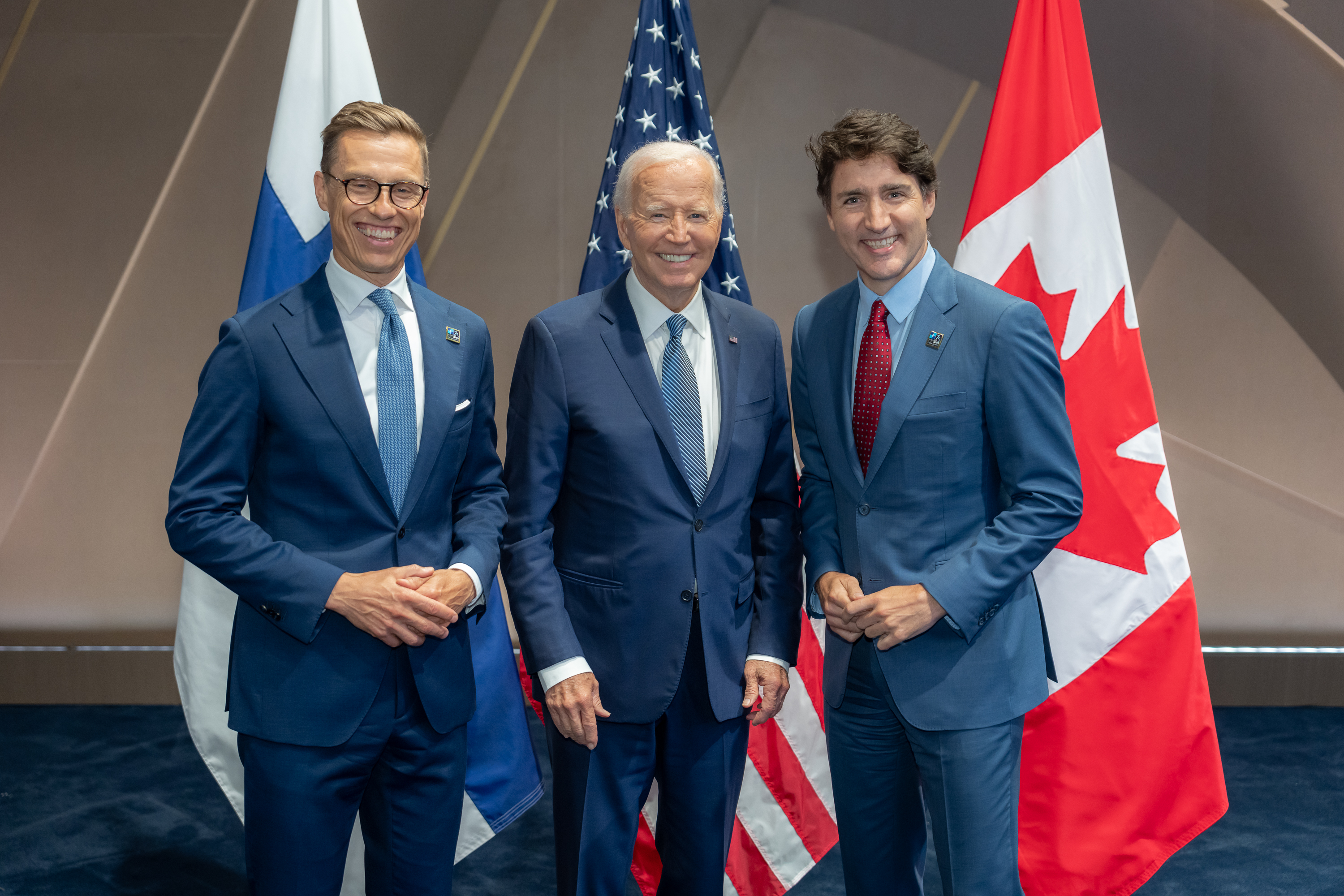
Finnish President Alexander Stubb meets with U.S. President Joe Biden and Canadian Prime Minister Justin Trudeau in Washington, D.C.

On 17 June, while visiting President Biden in Washington, D.C., ahead of the summit, NATO Secretary General Jens Stoltenberg announced that a record 23 of 32 NATO member states were meeting their defence spending targets of 2% of their country's GDP. According to NATO, defence spending for European member states and Canada was up 18%.

Several Eastern members of the block have pushed for higher military budgets. Poland's President Andrzej Duda called on NATO countries to urgently increase spending to 3% of their GDP. Poland is expected to and committed to allocating more than 4% of its GDP on defence in 2024, which would surpass other countries spending by a significant margin, while the Baltic states have jointly committed to invest at least 2.5% of GDP in defence.

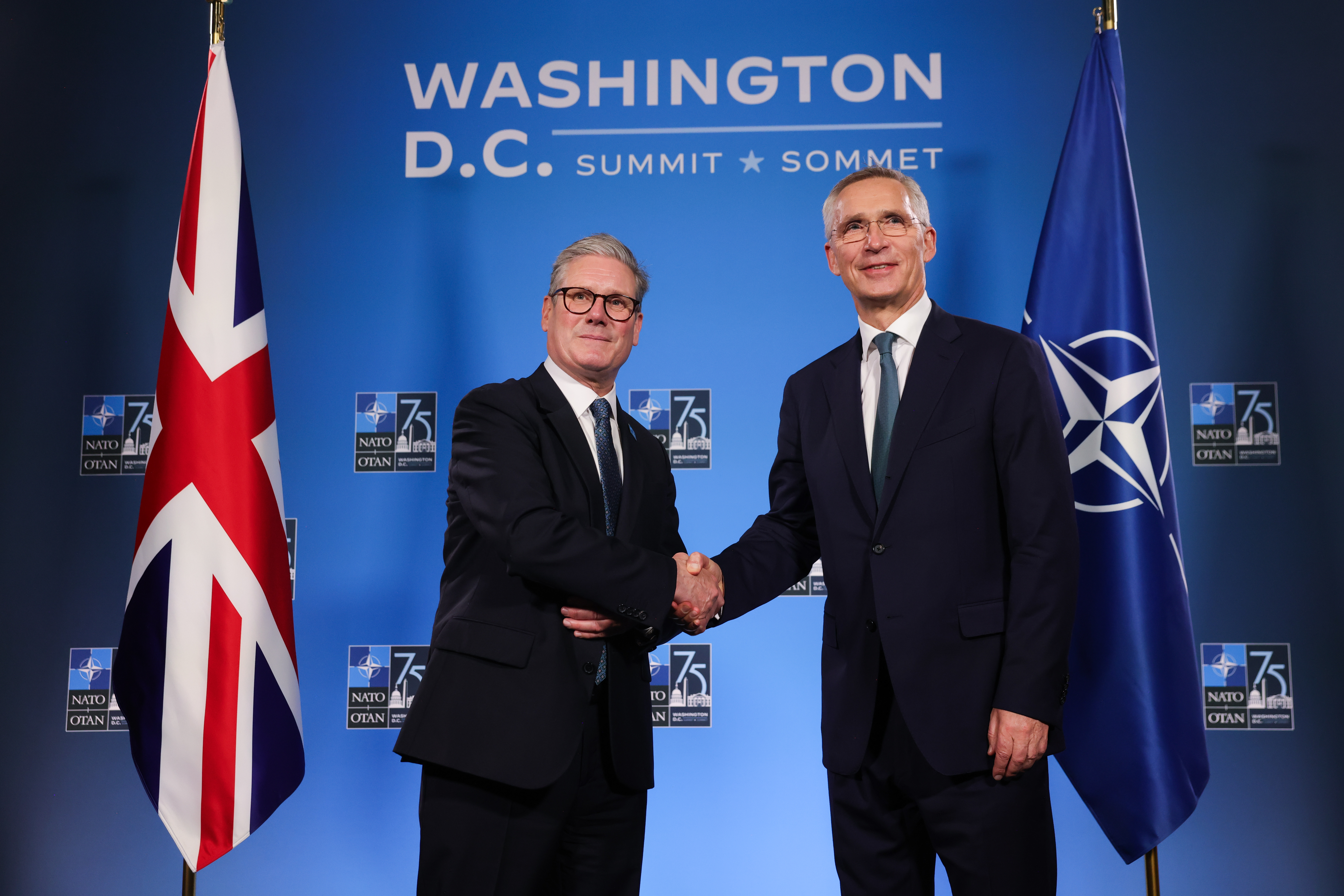
British Prime Minister Keir Starmer with outgoing NATO Secretary General Jens Stoltenberg

The UK Prime Minister Keir Starmer urged NATO members to increase defence spending further, aligning with his plans for the UK to allocate tens of billions of pounds extra to military budget in response to growing global threats faced by alliance members. Starmer also committed the United Kingdom to raising defence spending to 2.5%, though did not indicate when it would be raised. On the flight to the summit, Starmer reiterated his "cast iron commitment" to spending 2.5%. Starmer stated he will lay out a "road map", following a “root and branch” review of the country's defences, which officials said will include a concrete date to hit the spending target.

== Ukraine ==
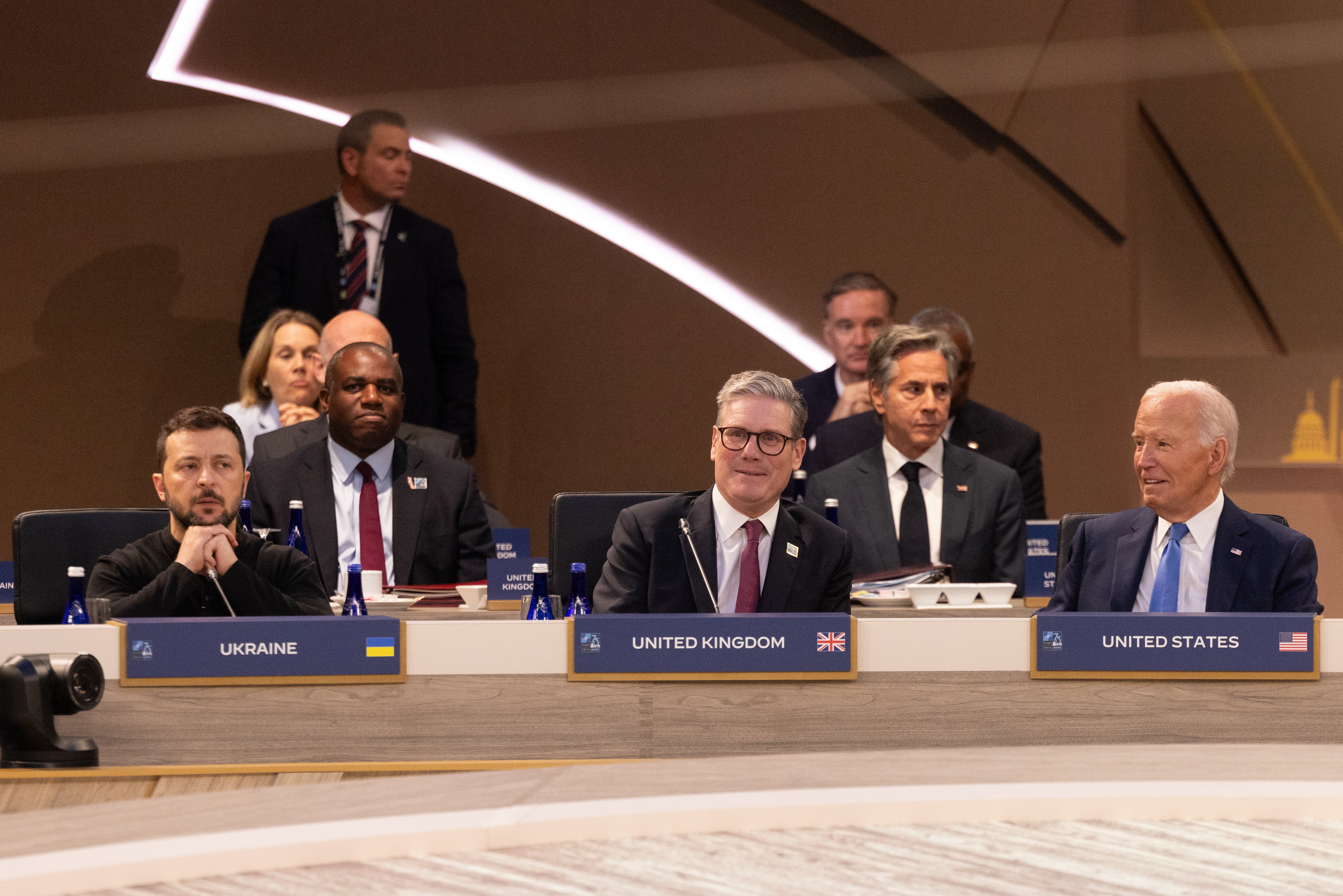
Zelenskyy in summit

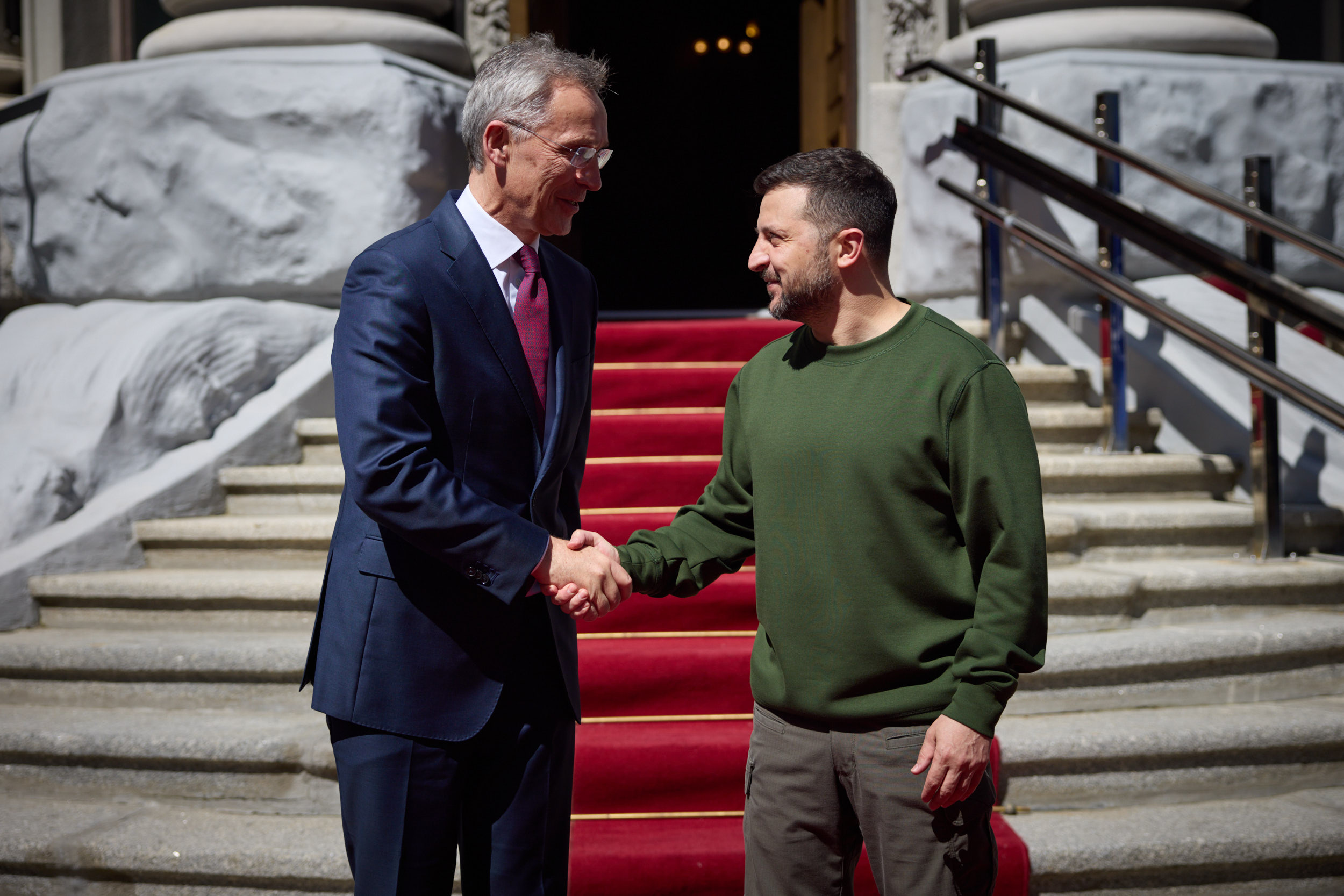
NATO Secretary General Jens Stoltenberg met with The President of Ukraine Volodymyr Zelenskyy in Kyiv

Leaders such as Biden supported the Ukraine Compact.

=== Ukrainian public stance on NATO ===
The Orange Revolution in Ukraine in 2004, which nullified the election of pro-Russian presidential candidate Viktor Yanukovych, still did not reflect on public opinion with a significant vote of 60% against joining NATO.

Following the Russian annexation of Crimea and pro-Russian unrest in 2014, Ukrainian support for NATO membership has been growing gradually. After the 2022 invasion, public stances on membership significantly changed from a relatively low 59.2% in favour and 28.1% against in 2021 to a resounding 89% in favour by May 2023. Subsequently, the rate stabilized at 77% in favour and 5% against by 2024.

=== NATO stance on Ukraine ===
NATO officially highlights support for Ukraine is unwavering, with the alliance determined to stand by Ukraine indefinitely. This stance is meant to send a strong message to Russia that NATO allies remain united and committed to help Ukraine fight off Russia's illegal invasion.

Although some NATO members, particularly those in Eastern Europe, pushed for Ukrainian accession to the alliance, they considered it to not be possible before the invasion ends due to the implication that NATO could be considered to be directly involved in the war with Russia if Ukraine were already made a member.

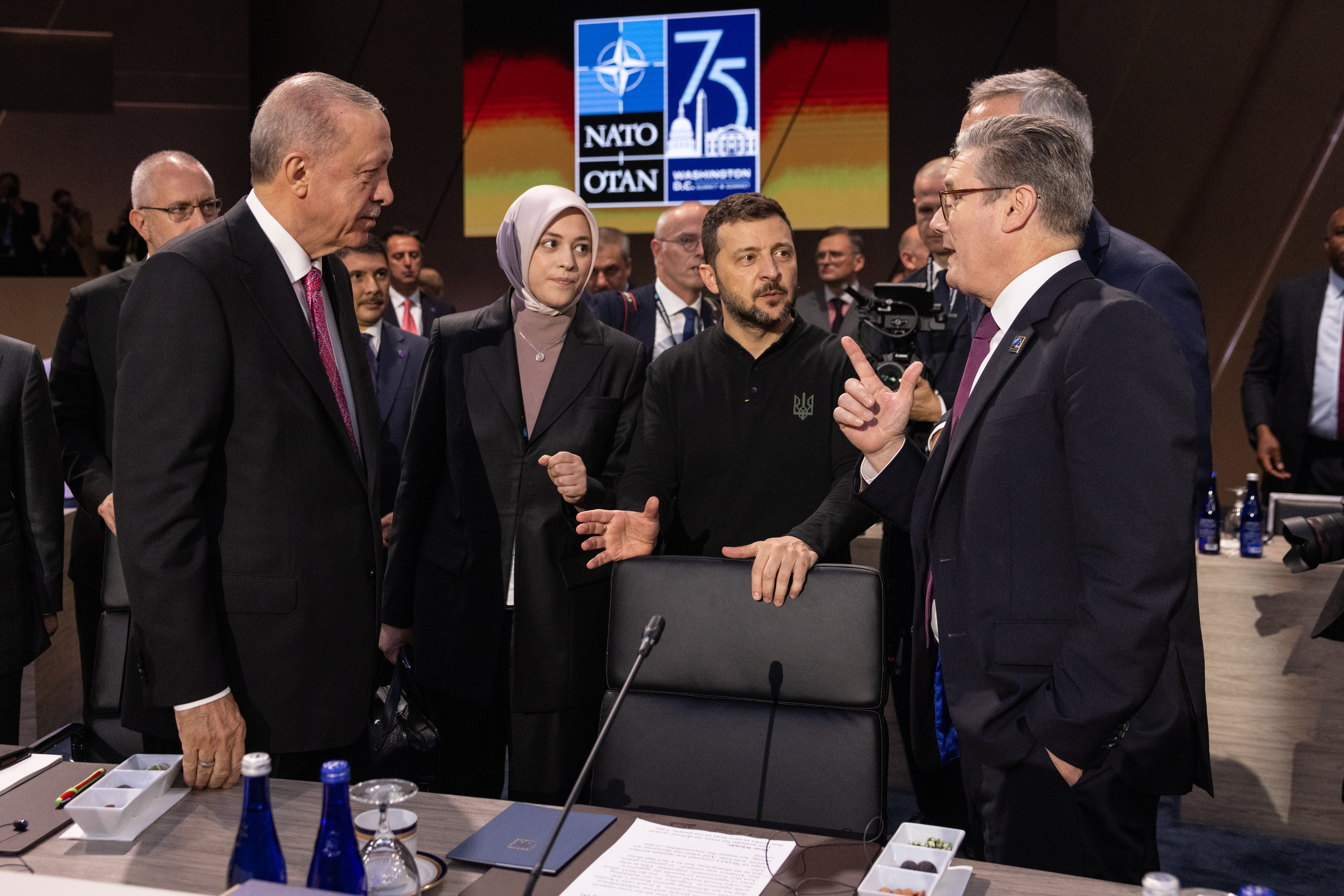
Turkish President Recep Tayyip Erdoğan (left) in Washington, D.C., July 11, 2024

== Israel–Gaza war ==
Speaking at the Washington summit, Spanish Prime Minister Pedro Sánchez urged NATO members to avoid "double standards" regarding the wars in Gaza and Ukraine, saying, "If we demand respect for international law in Ukraine, we must demand it in Gaza as well."

In his speech, Turkish President Recep Tayyip Erdoğan said that NATO values are being trampled by Israel in the Gaza Strip.

== Armenia–Azerbaijan relations ==
The foreign ministers of Armenia and Azerbaijan and U.S. Secretary of State Antony Blinken held a trilateral meeting on the sidelines of the summit. Armenia and Azerbaijan have made considerable progress towards finalizing a peace agreement following the border crisis and the 2023 Azerbaijani offensive in Nagorno-Karabakh. Blinken stated, "Today is an opportunity to take stock in the progress that's been made, what remains. But based on all of the engagements that we've had, including in recent weeks, I believe both countries are very close to being able to reach a final agreement, one that the United States would strongly, strongly support."

== Summit ==
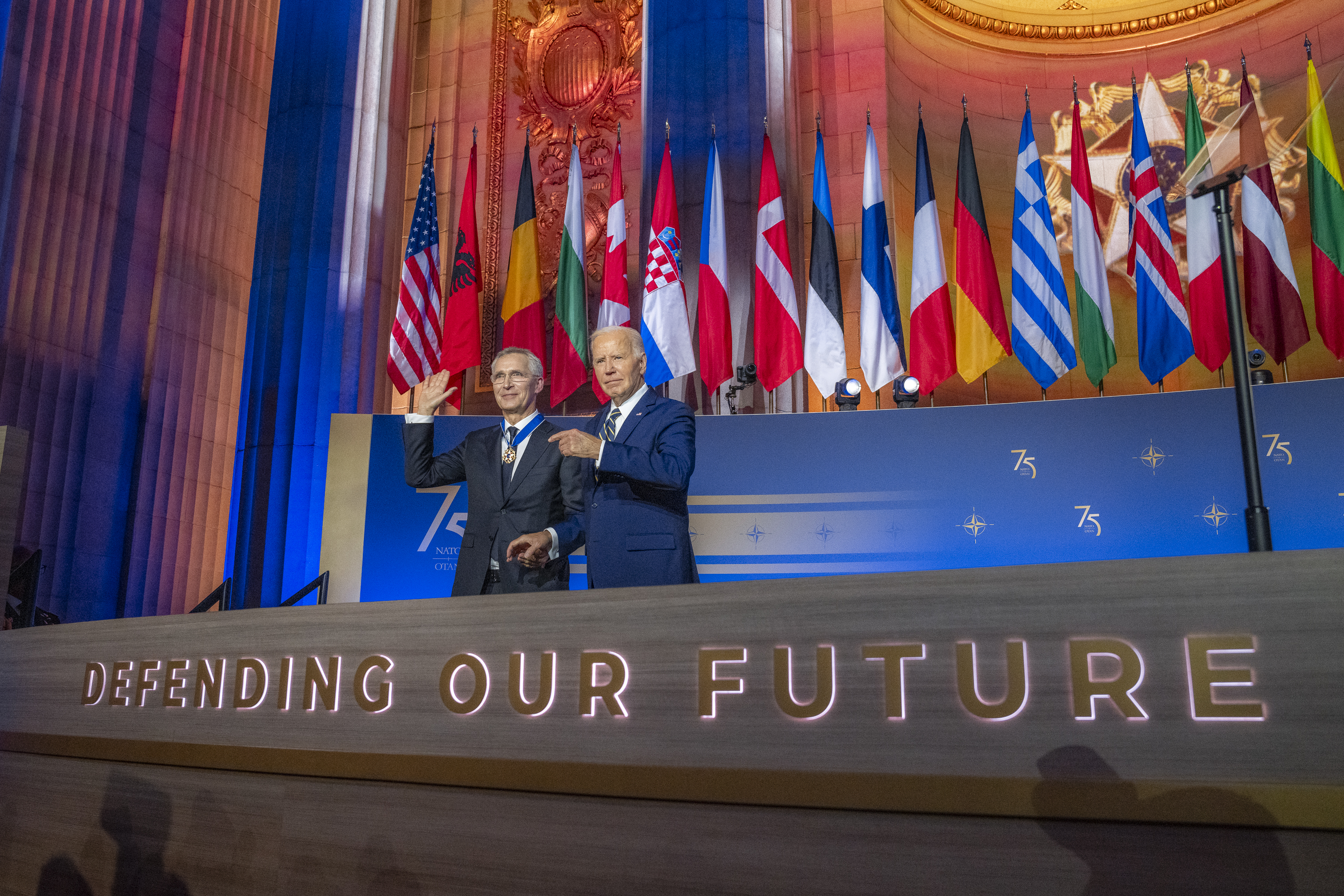
President Joe Biden awards NATO Secretary General Jens Stoltenberg the Presidential Medal of Freedom

The three day, 75th NATO summit opened on Tuesday, July 9, 2024, with a reception at the Andrew W. Mellon Auditorium. During the reception, United States President Joe Biden presented outgoing NATO Secretary General Jens Stoltenberg with the Presidential Medal of Freedom, the highest civilian award of the United States.

On the first day of the summit on July 9, 2024, US President Joe Biden accused Russian President Vladimir Putin of wanting to erase "Ukraine off the map". He announced that several NATO nations including the United States, the Netherlands, Germany, Italy, and Romania would provide Ukraine with equipment for five air defense systems. Ukrainian President Volodymyr Zelenskyy warned that action in Ukraine needed to be conducted prior to the U.S. presidential election in November 2024 to limit the impact of decisions Donald Trump might take, if he were elected president, to reduce support for NATO and Ukraine.

The alliance accused China of being a "decisive enabler of Russia’s war against Ukraine" through its "large-scale support for Russia’s defence industrial base".

On July 10, 2024, all 32 member states of NATO approved the Washington Summit Declaration that outlined the developments made by NATO and policy decisions made, primarily involving providing support for Ukraine in the face of Russia's invasion and condemning nations that supported Russia during the conflict, which included China, Iran, North Korea, and Belarus.

The United States announced its intention to deploy long-range missiles in Germany from 2026. US weapons in Germany would include SM-6 and Tomahawk cruise missiles and hypersonic weapons. The United States' decision to deploy missiles in Germany has been compared to the deployment of Pershing II launchers in Western Europe in the 1980s. The decision was supported by German Chancellor Olaf Scholz.

== Participants ==
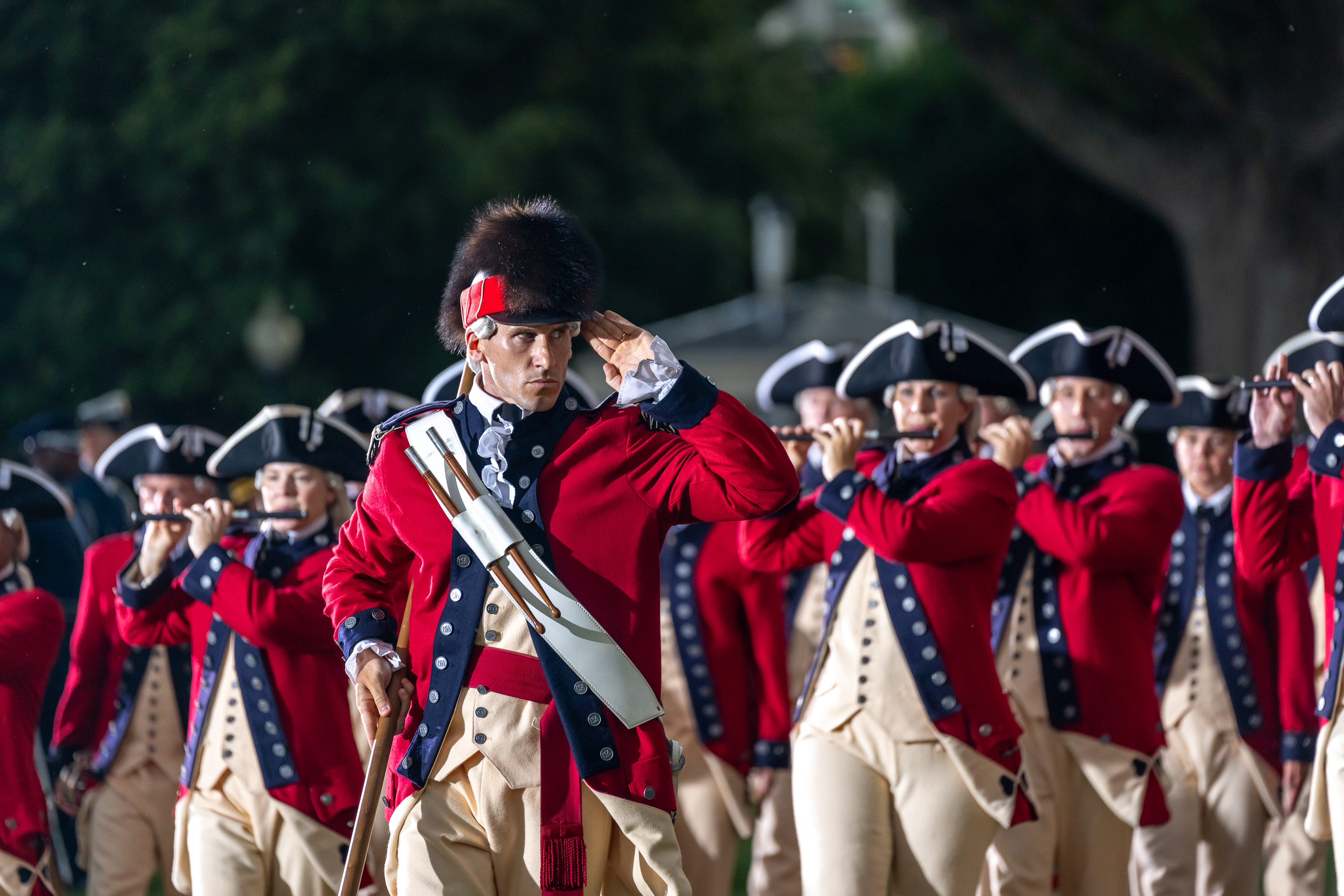
The Army Fife and Drum Corps performs a “Troop in Review”

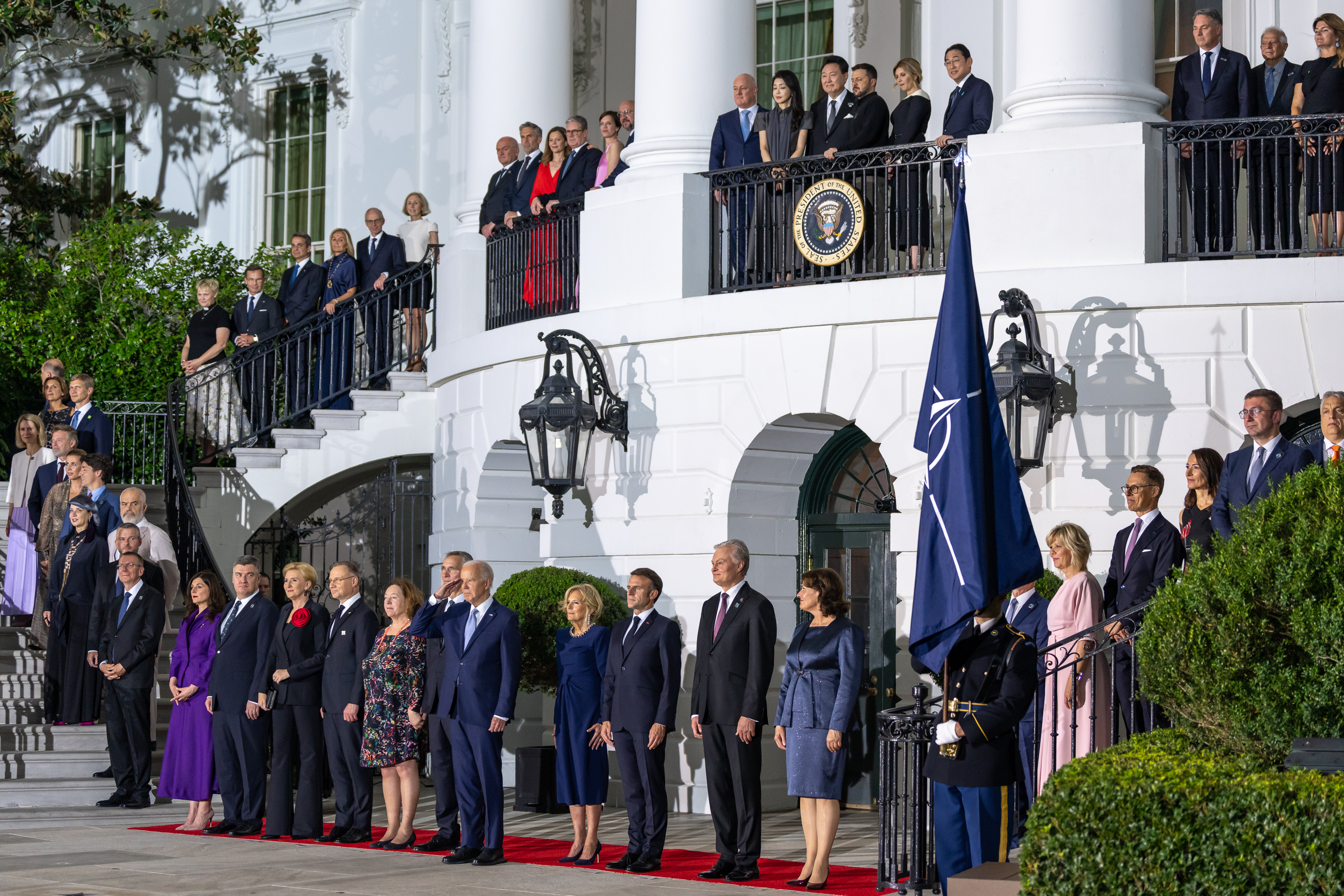
President Joe Biden and his guests on the South Lawn of the White House

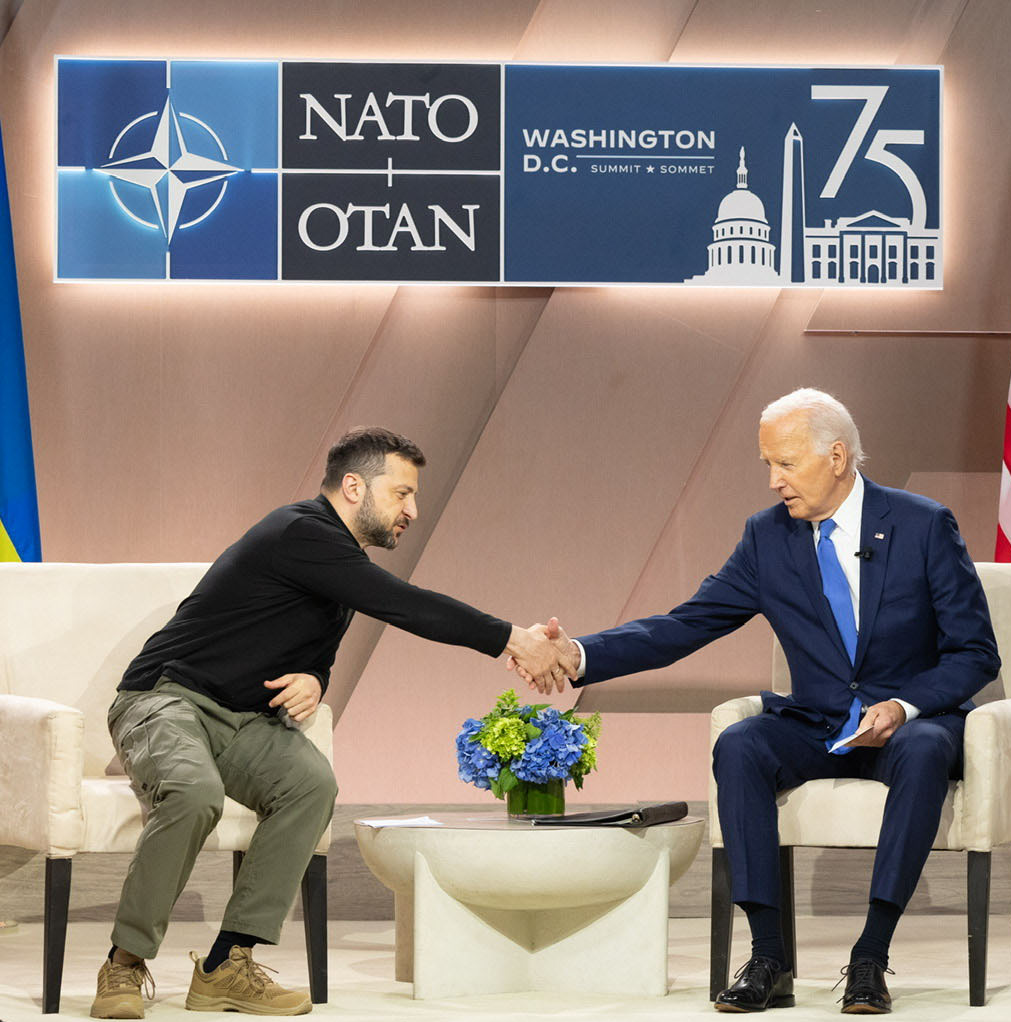
President Joe Biden shakes hands with Ukrainian President Volodymyr Zelenskyy during the NATO Summit in Washington, D.C., July 11, 2024

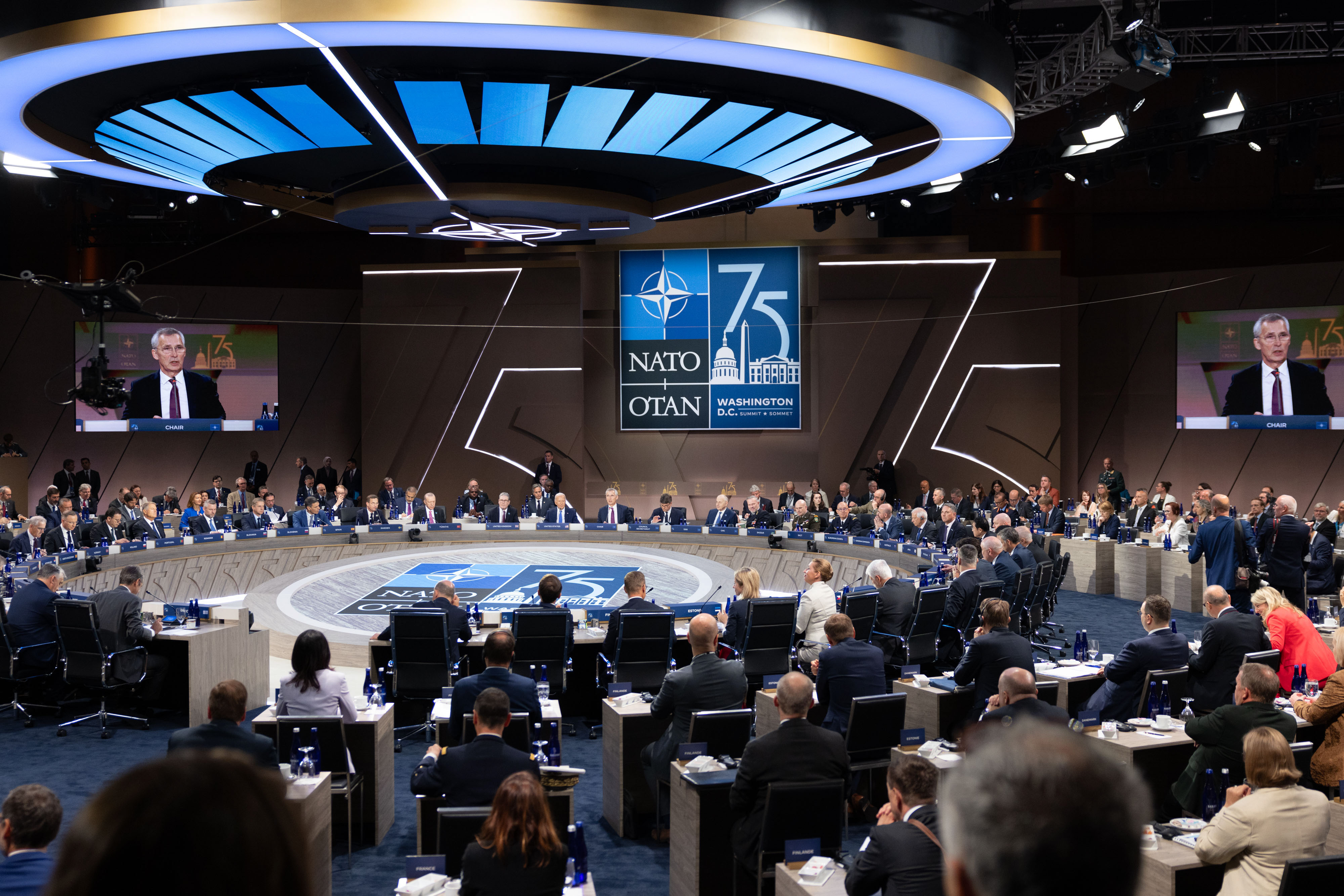
the NATO Summit at the Washington Convention Center in Washington, D.C., July 11, 2024

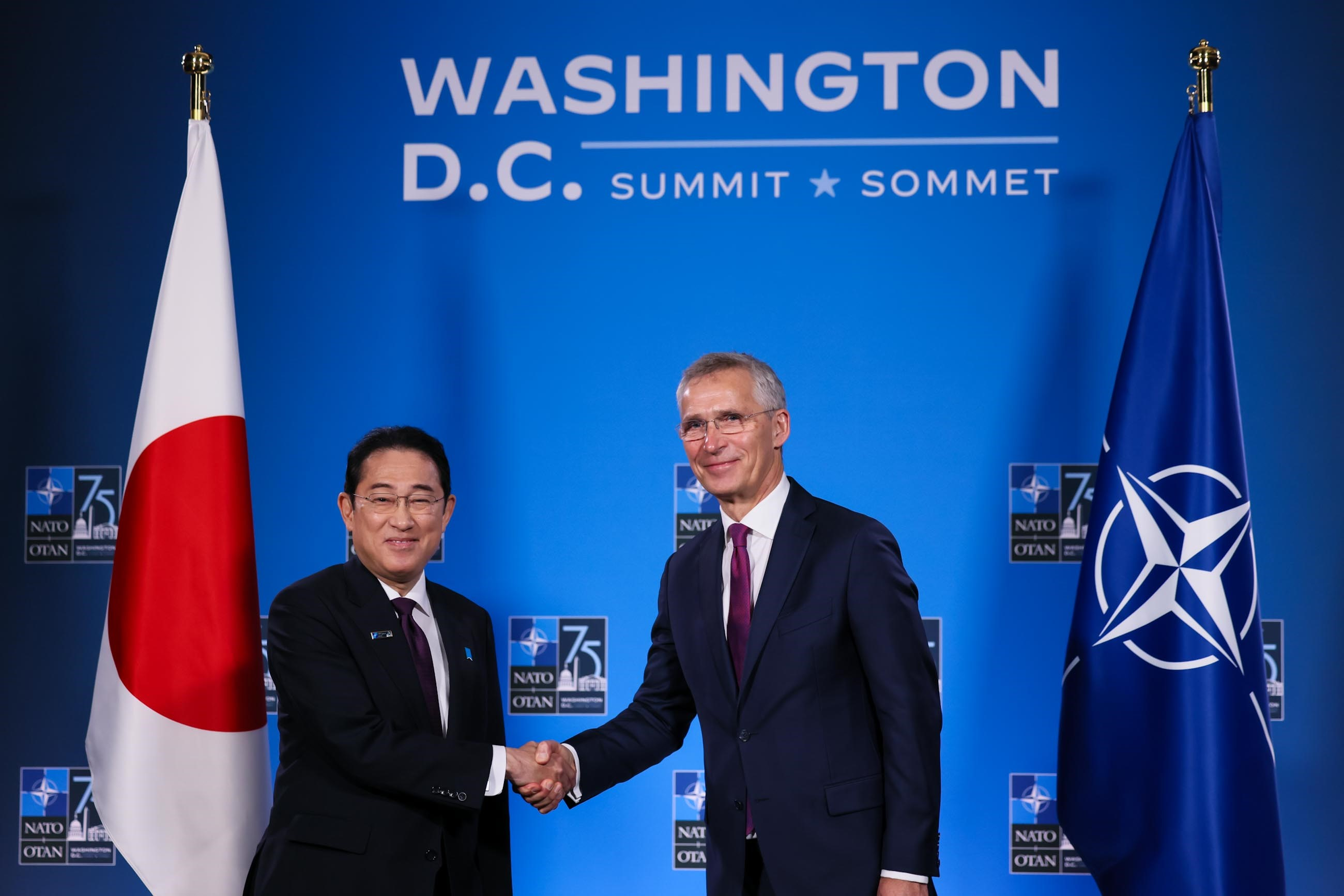
Japanese Prime Minister Fumio Kishida in Washington, D.C., July 11, 2024

Key
Non-NATO member

Country or organization	Head of delegation	Title	Ref.
NATO	Jens Stoltenberg	Secretary General	
Albania	Edi Rama	Prime Minister	
Armenia	Ararat Mirzoyan	Foreign Minister	
Australia	Richard Marles	Deputy Prime Minister	
Azerbaijan	Jeyhun Bayramov	Foreign Minister	
Belgium	Alexander De Croo	Prime Minister	
Bulgaria	Dimitar Glavchev	Prime Minister	
Canada	Justin Trudeau	Prime Minister	
Croatia	Zoran Milanović	President	
Czech Republic	Petr Pavel	President	
Denmark	Mette Frederiksen	Prime Minister	
Estonia	Kaja Kallas	Prime Minister	
European Union	Charles Michel	Council President	
European Union	Ursula von der Leyen	Commission President	
Finland	Alexander Stubb	President	
France	Emmanuel Macron	President	
Germany	Olaf Scholz	Chancellor	
Georgia	Ilia Darchiashvili	Foreign Minister	
Greece	Kyriakos Mitsotakis	Prime Minister	
Hungary	Viktor Orbán	Prime Minister	
Iceland	Bjarni Benediktsson	Prime Minister	
Israel	Israel Katz	Foreign Minister	
Italy	Giorgia Meloni	Prime Minister	
Japan	Fumio Kishida	Prime Minister	
Latvia	Edgars Rinkēvičs	President	
Lithuania	Gitanas Nausėda	President	
Luxembourg	Luc Frieden	Prime Minister	
Montenegro	Milojko Spajić	Prime Minister	
Netherlands	Dick Schoof	Prime Minister	
New Zealand	Christopher Luxon	Prime Minister	
North Macedonia	Hristijan Mickoski	Prime Minister	
Norway	Jonas Gahr Støre	Prime Minister	
Poland	Andrzej Duda	President	
Portugal	Luís Montenegro	Prime Minister	
South Korea	Yoon Suk Yeol	President	
Romania	Klaus Iohannis	President	
Slovakia	Peter Pellegrini	President	
Slovenia	Robert Golob	Prime Minister	
Spain	Pedro Sánchez	Prime Minister	
Sweden	Ulf Kristersson	Prime Minister	
Turkey	Recep Tayyip Erdoğan	President	
Ukraine	Volodymyr Zelenskyy	President	
United Kingdom	Keir Starmer	Prime Minister	
United States	Joe Biden (host)	President	

== See also ==
- 1978 Washington summit
- 1999 Washington summit
- 2012 Chicago summit
