= 1978 Washington NATO summit =

1978 NATO summit meeting in Washington, D.C., United States

Washington summit
- Host country: United States
- Dates: May 30–31, 1978

The 1978 Washington summit was the fifth NATO summit bringing the leaders of member nations together at the same time. The formal sessions and informal meetings in Washington, D.C. took place on May 30–31, 1978. This event was only the sixth meeting of the NATO heads of state following the ceremonial signing of the North Atlantic Treaty on April 4, 1949.

== Background ==
In this period, the organization faced unresolved questions concerned whether a new generation of leaders would be as committed to NATO as their predecessors had been.

== Synopsis ==
- Meeting with participation of Heads of State and Government
- Long-term trends in east–west relations
- Berlin and Germany
- Review of CSCE implementation at Belgrade
- Achievement of NATO Science Committee, 20th Anniversary
- Need to strengthen South Eastern flanks
- Concern at continual Warsaw Pact expansion of offensive capabilities
- SALT
- MBFR
- Leaders of States participating in NATO integrated defence approve LTDP and call for follow-through action by national authorities.

== See also ==
- 1999 Washington summit
- 2012 Chicago summit
- 2024 Washington summit
