= 2010 Lisbon NATO summit =

2010 NATO summit meeting in Lisbon, Portugal

2010 Lisbon Summit NATO Summit Lisbon 2010
- Logo of the 2010 Lisbon Summit
- Host country: Portugal
- Date: 19–20 November 2010
- Cities: Lisbon
- Venues: FIL – Feira Internacional de Lisboa, Parque das Nações
- Website: natolisboa2010.gov.pt/en/inicio/

The 2010 Lisbon summit was the summit of the heads of state and heads of government of NATO held in Lisbon, Portugal, on 19 and 20 November 2010.

The member states adopted a new "Strategic Concept", the alliance's new ten-year plan following the expiration of the previous plan adopted at the 1999 Washington summit. In addition to accepting the Strategic Concept that addressed the alliance's modern challenges such as terrorism and cyber attacks, the members agreed to develop a mutual missile defense system. The members met with President of Afghanistan Hamid Karzai regarding the group's operations in the country. They agreed to gradually withdraw combat forces from the country with a completion date of 2014. NATO reaffirmed their commitment to remain in Afghanistan to provide training and advice to Afghan forces and police.

== Summit ==
The summit took place in the Feira Internacional de Lisboa in Parque das Nações (Park of the Nations). It was the first summit presided over by Anders Fogh Rasmussen, who began his term as the secretary general of NATO in August 2009.

== In attendance ==
=== Member states ===
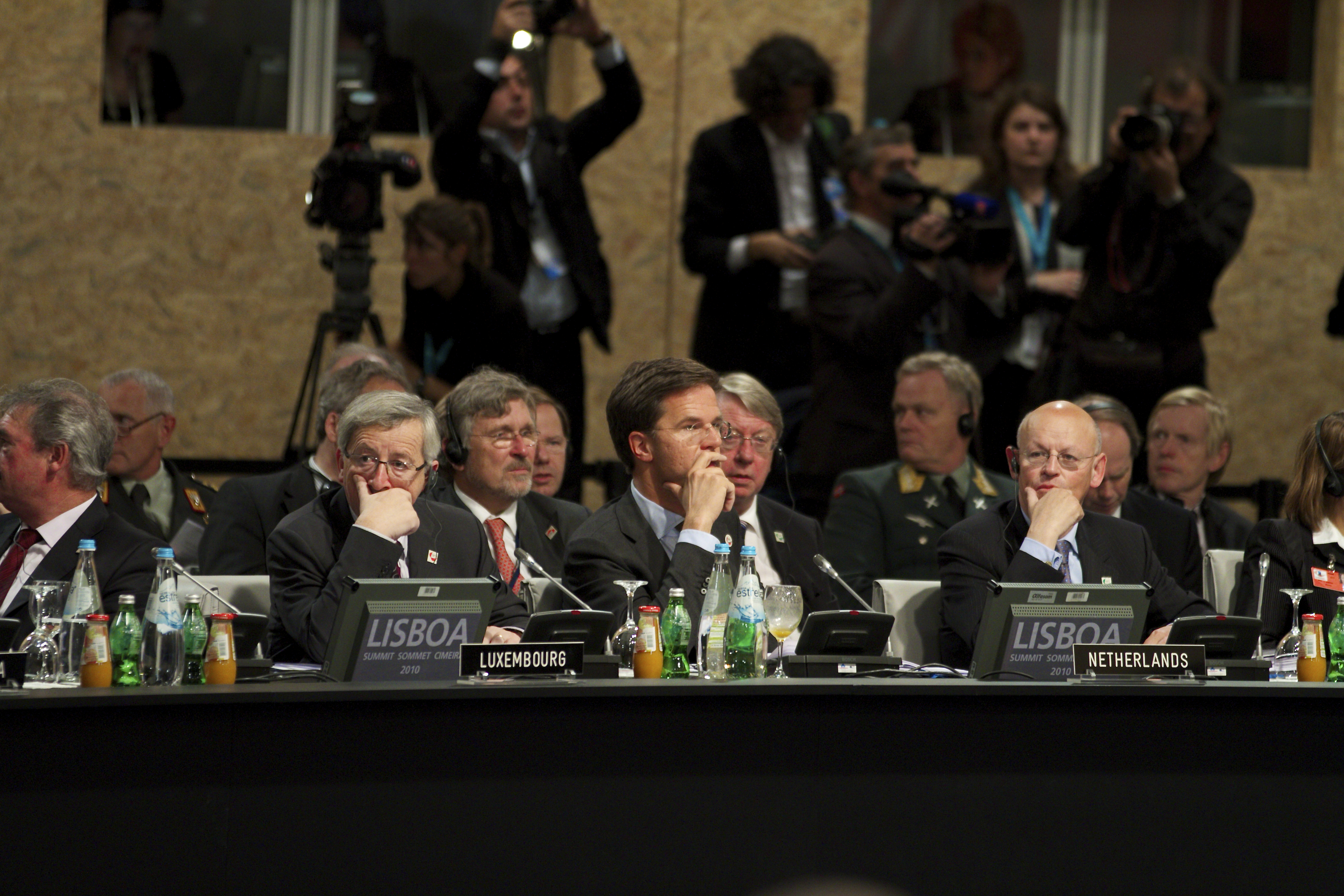
(From left to right) Prime Minister of Luxembourg Jean-Claude Juncker, Prime Minister of the Netherlands Mark Rutte, and Rutte's foreign minister Uri Rosenthal.

- Albania – President Bamir Topi
- Belgium – Prime Minister Yves Leterme
- Bulgaria – President Georgi Parvanov
- Canada – Prime Minister Stephen Harper
- Croatia – President Ivo Josipović
- Czech Republic – Prime Minister Petr Nečas
- Denmark – Prime Minister Lars Løkke Rasmussen
- Estonia – Prime Minister Andrus Ansip
- France – President Nicolas Sarkozy
- Germany – Chancellor Angela Merkel
- Greece – Prime Minister George Papandreou
- Hungary – Prime Minister Viktor Orbán
- Iceland – Prime Minister Jóhanna Sigurðardóttir
- Italy – Prime Minister Silvio Berlusconi
- Latvia – Prime Minister Valdis Dombrovskis
- Lithuania – President Dalia Grybauskaitė
- Luxembourg – Prime Minister Jean-Claude Juncker
- Netherlands – Prime Minister Mark Rutte
- Norway – Prime Minister Jens Stoltenberg
- Poland – President Bronisław Komorowski
- Portugal – Prime Minister José Sócrates
- Romania – President Traian Băsescu
- Slovakia – President Ivan Gašparovič
- Slovenia – Prime Minister Borut Pahor
- Spain – Prime Minister José Luis Rodríguez Zapatero
- Turkey – President Abdullah Gül
- United Kingdom – Prime Minister David Cameron
- United States – President Barack Obama

=== Non-member states ===
- Afghanistan – President Hamid Karzai, addressed the summit on 20 November.
- Armenia – Foreign Minister Eduard Nalbandyan
- Australia – Prime Minister Julia Gillard and Defence Minister Stephen Smith.
- Austria – President Heinz Fischer.
- Azerbaijan – President Ilham Aliyev.
- Bosnia and Herzegovina – Presidency of Bosnia and Herzegovina .
- Finland – President Tarja Halonen.
- (Georgia (country)) Georgia – President Mikheil Saakashvili. Georgia has been at the Intensified Dialogue stage of accession to NATO since 2006.
- (Republic of Ireland) Ireland – President Mary McAleese.
- Jordan – Prime Minister Samir Rifai.
- (North Macedonia) Macedonia – President Gjorge Ivanov.
- Malaysia – Prime Minister Najib Tun Razak..
- Mongolia – President Tsakhiagiin Elbegdorj.
- New Zealand – Foreign Minister Murray McCully.
- Russia – President Dmitry Medvedev, was the first Russian to attend since strained relations because of the 2008 South Ossetia war.
- Singapore
- South Korea
- Sweden – Prime Minister Fredrik Reinfeldt.
- United Arab Emirates
- United Nations – Secretary-General Ban Ki-moon

== Agenda ==
=== Strategic Concept ===
Going into the summit, the member states were expected to adopt a new Strategic Concept for the first time since 1999. Prior to the summit, Secretary General Rasmussen personally prepared a draft of the plan. Rasmussen said the goal of the new Strategic Concept "must reconfirm Nato's core task – territorial defence – but modernise how we do it, including cyber defence and missile defence." A group of experts led by former United States Secretary of State Madeleine Albright drafted a report to help prepare the plan. At meetings prior to the summit, officials said that the plan was "98% there" and that any additional disagreements would be addressed at the summit. The draft acknowledged that modern threats to the alliance's members come in non-traditional forms such as terrorism, possessing weapons of mass destruction, and cyber attacks that could disrupt power infrastructure.

During the first day of the summit on Friday 19 November, the member states agreed to the new Strategic Concept that will serve as the alliance's mission plan for the next 10 years. The document addressed the importance of evolving threats to international security, and reemphasized the alliance's commitment to cooperation with prospective members and Russia. The 11-page document is titled "Active Engagement, Modern Defence".

=== Afghanistan ===
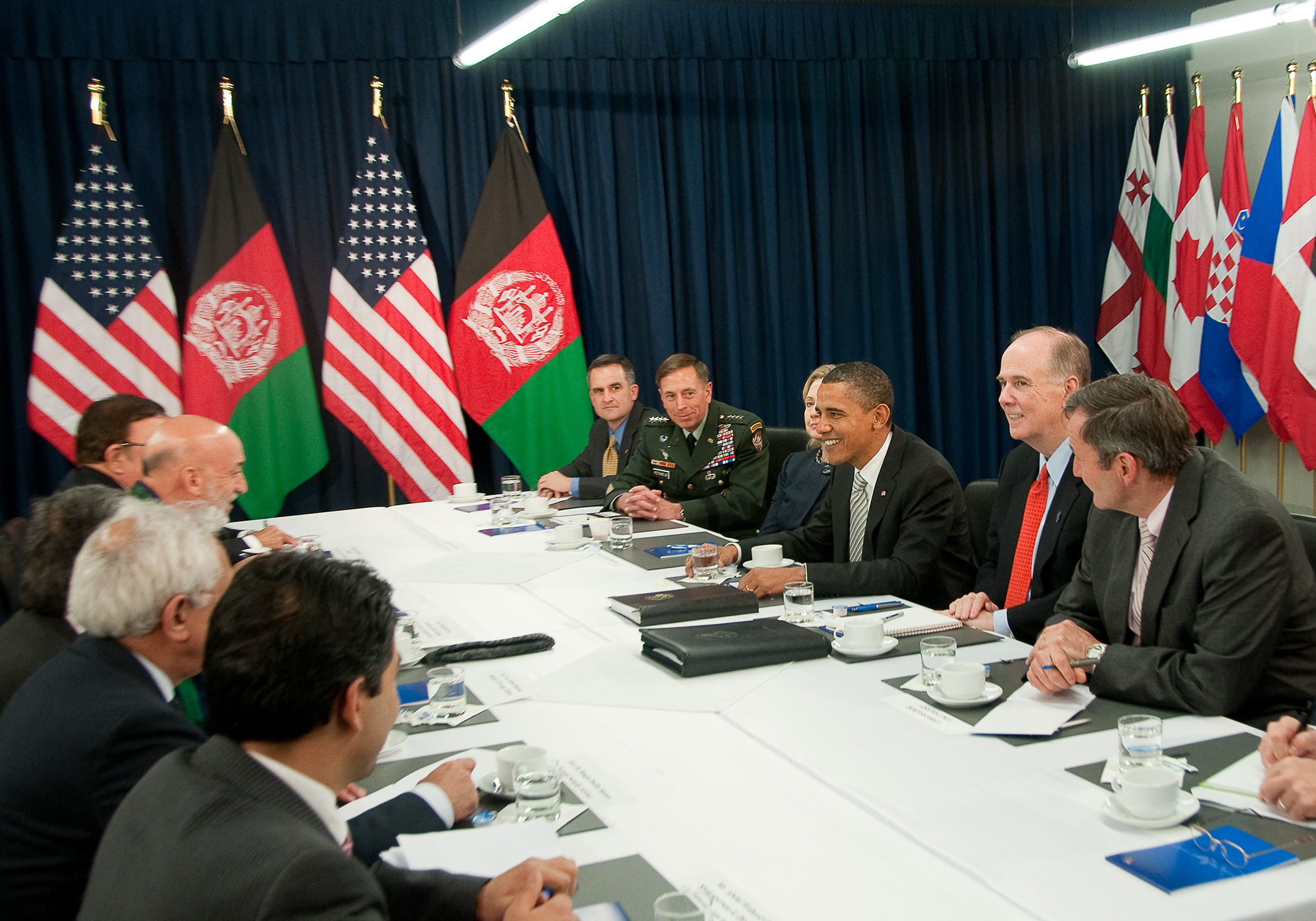
President of the United States Barack Obama meeting with President of Afghanistan Hamid Karzai.

President of Afghanistan Hamid Karzai addressed the summit on Saturday 20 November. Karzai had said that he wants NATO to return control of the country by the end of 2014. Before the summit, British Prime Minister David Cameron said that the "NATO Summit in Lisbon is set to mark the starting point for passing responsibility for security progressively to Afghan forces."

While meeting with Karzai, the members agreed to a gradual phase-out of combat operations until 2014. After that date, NATO states would continue to contribute to training and advising the Afghan National Army. Secretary-General Rasmussen said "we will launch the process by which the Afghan government will take leadership for security throughout the country, district by district." Though the members set the 2014 target date, many have already stated that their withdrawals will take place outside of any NATO decision.

=== Russia ===
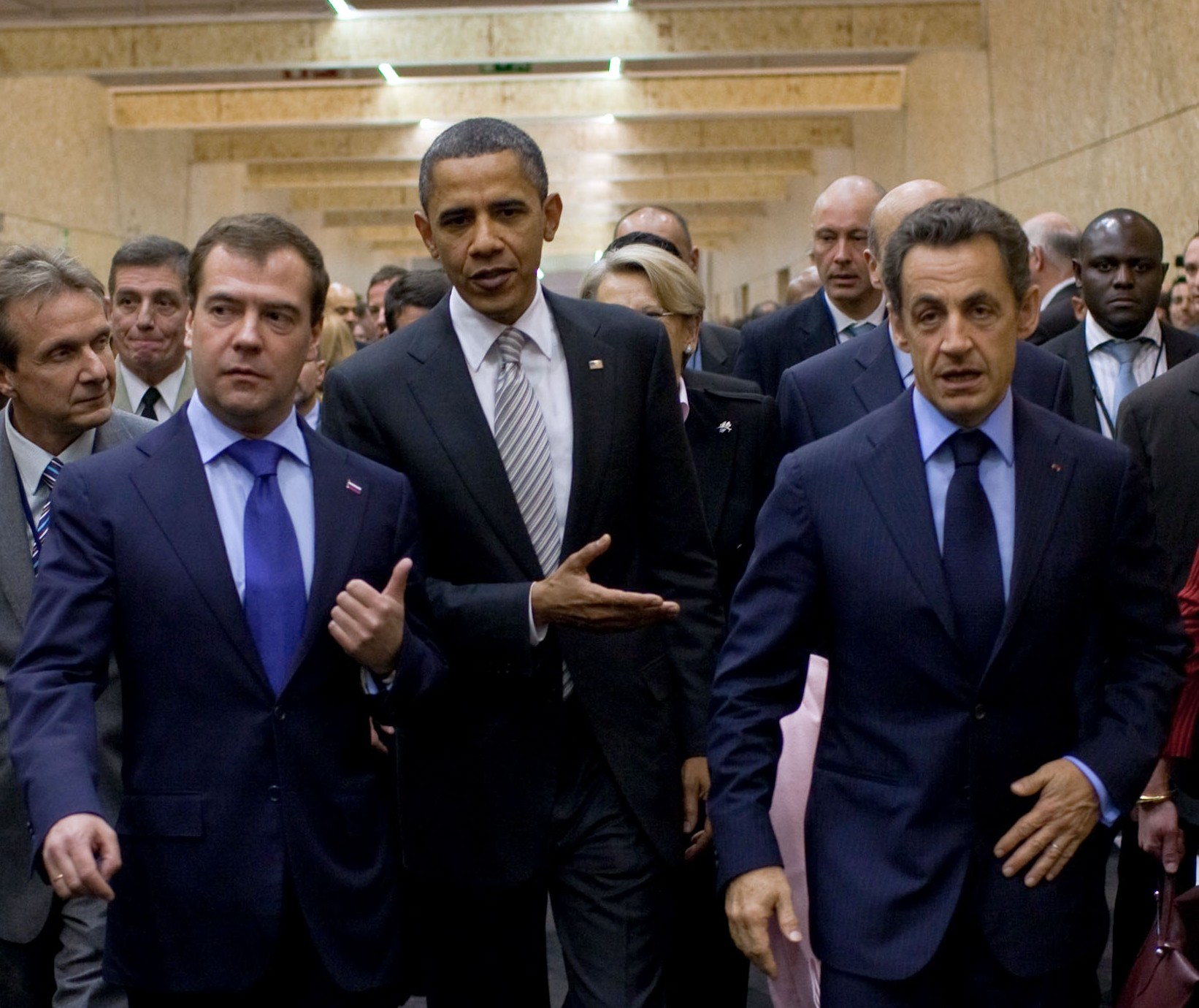
Russian President Dimitry Medvedev, American President Barack Obama, and French President Nicolas Sarkozy on the summit's second day.

In October 2010, Rasmussen announced that Russian President Dimitry Medvedev would be present at the summit. Medvedev agreed to attend after meeting with French President Nicolas Sarkozy and German Chancellor Angela Merkel. The summit then held the first meeting of the NATO-Russia Council since it was created in 2002. Relations between Russia and the alliance had been strained following the 2008 South Ossetia war, when Russia supported and recognized the breakaway regions of South Ossetia and Abkhazia in Georgia.

Prior to the summit, an article in The Economist noted that Russia may be more willing to cooperate on NATO issues and may pledge to contribute troops to Afghanistan. At the meeting, Russia agreed to cooperate on a missile defense programme that NATO sought to develop. Russia also committed to further support NATO's operations in Afghanistan by permitting more supplies to be transported through Russia and providing Mil Mi-17 helicopters to Afghan forces.

=== Missile defense ===
On the first day of the summit, leaders agreed to establish a missile defense system that would have the capability of covering all member states in Europe, as well as the United States and Canada. The proposed system had previously been a point of debate between NATO and Russia, but Russian President Dmitry Medvedev, who attended the summit, indicated more willingness to cooperate with the alliance on the issue.
