= Occupy Chicago =

Protest group against economic inequality

- Part of the Occupy movement
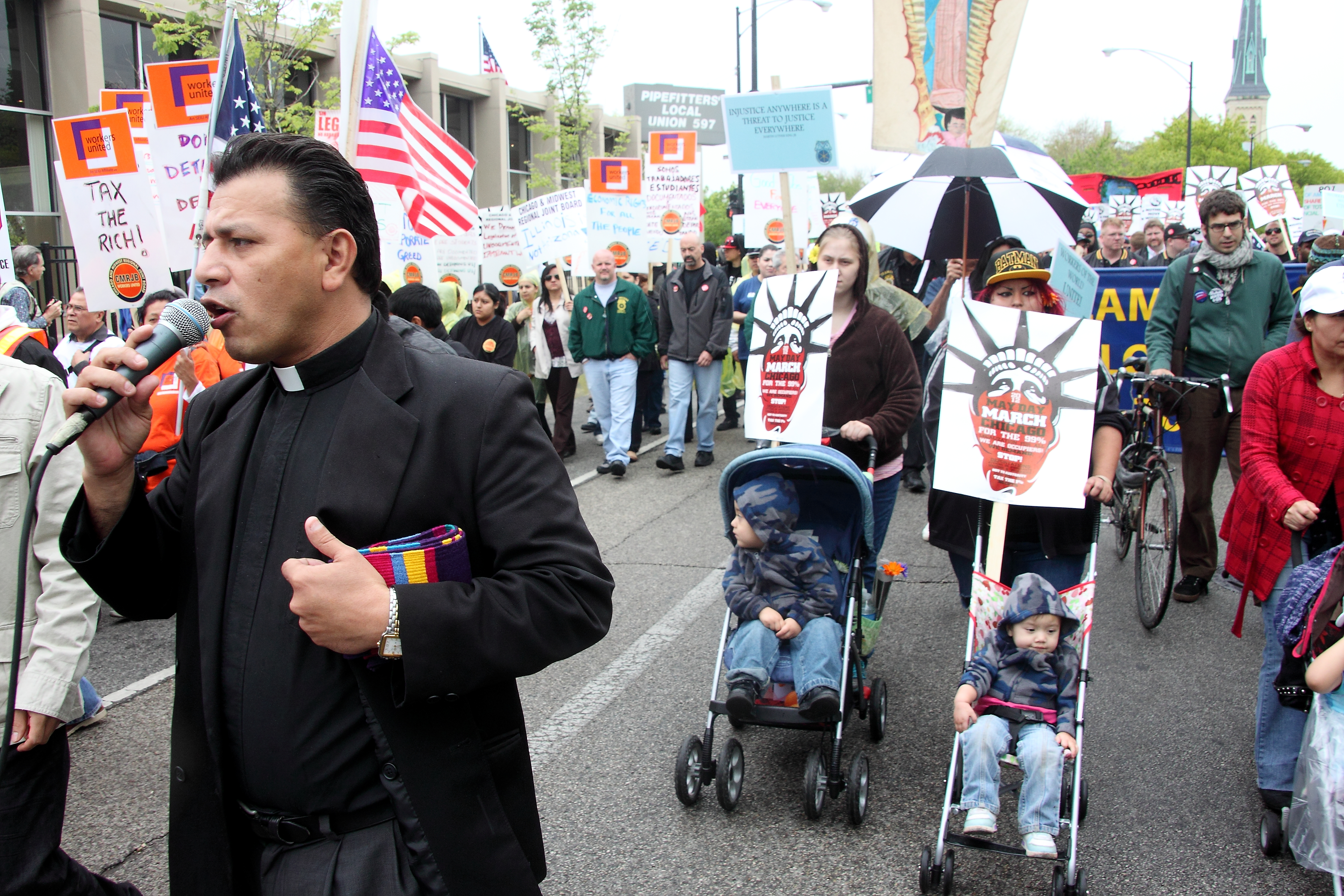
- Occupy Chicago
- Date: September 23, 2011 – February 1, 2013
- Location: Chicago, Illinois, United States
- Caused by: Economic inequality, corporate influence over government, inter alia.
- Methods: Demonstration, occupation, protest, street protesters

Arrests and injuries
- Injuries: Unrecorded
- Arrested: 130–170

Occupy Chicago was an ongoing collaboration that included peaceful protests and demonstrations against economic inequality, corporate greed and the influence of corporations and lobbyists on government which began in Chicago on September 24, 2011. The protests began in solidarity with the Occupy Wall Street protests in New York.

On October 10, 2011, protesters from Occupy Chicago joined with members of the "Stand Up Chicago" coalition and marched through downtown Chicago, with numbers estimated at 3,000.

== Origin ==
Occupy Chicago occupied the corners of Jackson and LaSalle in Chicago's financial district. Occupy Chicago was unique among the major occupations across the country in that it lacked a permanent encampment. Protesters remained outdoors, exposed to the elements 24 hours a day. Due to city ordinances, protesters were told that all supplies had to be technically "mobile." Protesters complied with the city by containing all of the occupation's supplies (including signs, food, and clothing) in carts on the sidewalk. It also has created a more fluid atmosphere at Occupy Chicago with individual protesters fluctuating in and out.

Occupy Chicago was also unique in that unlike Occupy Wall Street it is positioned directly in front of major financial centers, including the Board of Trade, Bank of America, and the Federal Reserve Building. This proximity has resulted in the curious sight of traders watching the protesters while outside on breaks. It has also resulted in taunts from workers in the Board of Trade. On October 4, 2011, a sign was visible in the windows of the Board of Trade that read, "WE ARE THE 1%." The sign was quickly taken down.

In late 2011 Occupy Chicago was able to recruit massive crowds of people to embark on protest marches throughout Chicago because its politics were still very inclusive with primarily "left" liberal minded people and communists, socialists, anarchists but also a fair share of libertarians and even a few who identified as conservative. Over time as the political direction of the group developed many of the more moderate individuals left and a more radical political stance became dominant within the movement. In 2011, Occupy Chicago was the foundation for the Occupy High School campaign.

== Attempts at permanent occupation ==
Seeking to create a permanent, sheltered base, over 175 protesters were arrested under the orders of Chicago's mayor Rahm Emanuel on the morning of October 16 after refusing to take down tents and remaining in Grant Park near Chicago's lakefront after the park's posted closing hours. Remaining in any unfenced park between 11 P.M. and 4 A.M. or erecting a tent or other structure without a permit is a crime according to the Municipal Code of Chicago (MCC) and park district ordinances.

One week later, during a second attempt at occupation during the evening of October 22 and morning of October 23rd, Chicago police arrested 130 demonstrators, again for refusing to leave the park after the posted closing hours. Two of those arrested were nurses and members of National Nurses United who had set up a medical tent to provide any needed medical services to the occupation.

== Thompson Center ==
On October 27, 2011, Occupy Chicago planned a candlelight vigil in solidarity with Scott Olsen and Occupy Oakland. The 30 protesters were met with Chicago Police Department officers and Illinois State Troopers on order from governor Pat Quinn armed with tear gas masks, attack dogs, and police wagons.

== Indoor space at 500 W. Cermak ==
Occupy Chicago remained outdoors without an encampment until January 2012 when the organization acquired an indoor space at 500 W. Cermak in the East Pilsen neighborhood.

After the NATO summit left Chicago May 21, 2012 the Occupy Chicago loft rental was downsized from two units to one smaller unit, where general assemblies and committee meetings were held, as well as a space for storage.

== Occupied Chicago Tribune ==
The Occupied Chicago Tribune was founded in November 2011, during a general assembly meeting. Its first issue was printed in December, 2011 and had a circulation of 20,000.

The Tribune Company (which owns the Chicago Tribune) initially negotiated informally with the Occupied Chicago Tribune (OCT) to change their name and logo. As a result, OCT eliminated the Gothic font in their headlines and added the disclaimer: "Media for the 99 percent. We're proud to have no affiliation whatsoever with the 1% Chicago Tribune or the Tribune Co." to their print copies.

On May 22, 2012, the Tribune Company filed a Uniform Domain Name Dispute Resolution Policy (UDRP) proceeding with the World Intellectual Property Organization (WIPO) alleging OCT acquired the two web domains OccupyChicagoTribune.org and OccupiedChicagoTribune.org "in bad faith" and in order to "divert traffic" from Tribune websites. OCT was represented pro bono by People's Law Office.

The Electronic Frontier Foundation wrote a statement in support of OCT, and critiqued UDRP process for not applying locally relevant laws such as fair use and First Amendment within the U.S.

In July 2012, the WIPO panel held the Occupied Chicago Tribune's domains to be legitimate, did not mislead the public and did not infringe on the Tribune Company's property. In their decision they wrote:

... the Occupy Movement is so well known within the relevant area (both parties being from Chicago, Illinois, in the United States) that the Domain Names are not confusingly similar to Complainant's mark. The Panel agrees with Respondent's assertion that no reasonable person in the Chicago area would confuse the Domain Names with Complainant or Complainant's publication.

== Issues ==
In addition to the national and global issues addressed by the Occupy movement at large, Occupy Chicago has been active in local political issues.

=== NATO Summit ===
In a move to bolster law enforcement of the Occupy movement and upcoming G8 and NATO summits, in Chicago, Mayor Rahm Emanuel's recently passed ordinance imposes harsher fines and rules for protests and demonstrations. A letter sent by Occupy Chicago to 50 of Chicago's aldermen reads: "Given what the ordinance actually says, it cannot be construed as an effort to protect the integrity of G8 and NATO conferences. This measure is a permanent attack on public protest in the City of Chicago. The consequences of this attack will be far reaching, and will be felt by protesters throughout the city, most of whom will never have any connection to the protests associated with these events." During the NATO summit, federal, state and local law enforcement made any presence of protesters, even at the corners of LaSalle and Jackson light. Police had presence had Metra train stations.

=== Howard Morgan case ===
The group has also become involved in the case of Howard Morgan, a black off-duty police officer who was shot 28 times by four white officers. Morgan was jailed, with bail set at $2 million, for a handful of charges including attempted murder. He was freed after a trial in 2007, but then convicted in January 2012. Occupy Chicago demonstrated at his April 5, 2012, sentencing, where judge Clayton Crane sentenced him to 40 years in prison.

== See also ==
Occupy articles

- List of global Occupy protest locations
- Occupy movement
- Timeline of Occupy Wall Street
- We are the 99%

Other Protests

- 15 October 2011 global protests
- 2011 United States public employee protests
- 2011 Wisconsin protests

Related articles

- Arab Spring
- Corruption Perceptions Index
- Economic inequality
- Grassroots movement
- Income inequality in the United States
- Plutocracy
- Protest
- Tea Party protests
- Wealth inequality in the United States

Related portals:
