= Howard Morgan case =

2005 shooting and resulting criminal case in Chicago

Howard Morgan incident
- Date: February 21, 2005
- Time: 12:45AM
- Location: Lawndale Ave. & 19th St
- Also known as: North Lawndale
- Participants: Howard Morgan, John Wrigley, Eric White, Timothy Finley, Nicolas Olsen
- Injuries: Howard Morgan
- Charges: four counts of attempted murder, four counts of aggravated battery of a police officer, two counts of discharging a firearm
- Verdict: 2007: not guilty; 2012: guilty of attempted murder
- Morgan was the individual found guilty of attempted murder

The Howard Morgan case revolves around an incident that took place on February 21, 2005, in Chicago, Illinois. Howard Morgan, a retired officer of the Chicago Police Department, was shot 28 times by four active Chicago police officers: John Wrigley, Eric White, Timothy Finley and Nicolas Olsen. Morgan was accused of aggravated battery, discharging a firearm, and attempted murder; no charges were filed against the police officers. Morgan was found not guilty of battery or discharging a firearm in his 2007 trial; no verdict was returned on attempted murder. Morgan was tried a second time for attempted murder and convicted in January 2012. In April 2012, he was sentenced to 40 years in prison. His case drew outrage from activists within Chicago and around the country. In January 2015, departing Illinois governor Pat Quinn granted him clemency.

== Background ==
In 2005, Morgan was 53 years old and lived in the North Lawndale neighborhood. He was a detective assigned to the Burlington Northern Santa Fe railway—a job he began in 1992. Morgan has children and grandchildren and has no criminal history.

== Incident ==
Morgan was driving home from his job as senior patrolman at the railroad. Around 12:45 AM on February 21, Chicago police officers John Wrigley and Timothy Finley pulled him over— for driving the wrong way on a one-way street and for having his lights off; they were joined by Officers Nicolas Olsen and Eric White. The events which followed are in dispute.

Morgan says he was pulled from his vehicle by the four officers, who restrained him as he sought to produce police identification. He says one of the officers found his gun (a Glock 9mm), shouted "gun!," and removed the gun from Morgan's waistband. Next came a wave of shooting.

According to the officers, Finley saw Morgan pull out his gun. Finley yelled to the other three. Morgan fired seventeen gunshots, hitting Olsen's upper right arm, White's right calf, and Wrigley's left arm.

Charice Rush, the only testifying third party witness at the scene, said she saw the officers 'snatch' Morgan from his van and force him onto one knee. She overheard an officer say "Oh shit, he has a gun." Rush said she saw the four officers open fire on Morgan while he lay on the ground.

Morgan was reported as having been shot 25 times. By the end of Morgan's 2007 trial, this number had been revised to 28. In addition to the 28 bullets that hit Morgan, many more were shot into the air, into Morgan's van, and into the walls and furniture of nearby houses.

He was transported to Mt. Sinai hospital where his condition was reported as critical. According to Phillip Zaret, the trauma surgeon who treated on Morgan that night, Morgan had injuries to his neck, back, leg, liver, kidney, and colon. Dr. Zaret also treated Olsen for the wound to his arm.

Morgan took 7 months to recover.

== Bail, imprisonment and release ==
On April 15, 2005, a bail hearing was held in a conference room of Oak Forest County Hospital, where Morgan was recovering. Judge Kathleen Mary Pantle set his bail at $2 million.

Judge Clayton Crane later upheld the $2 million bail despite requests from Morgan's lawyer, Sam Adam Jr., that he be allowed lower bail to facilitate his recovery.

Rosalind Morgan, Howard Morgan's wife, was able to raise $12,000 in donations for her husband's bail. The remaining necessary $188,000 was added all at once by a single anonymous donor.

== 2007 trial ==
Morgan was prosecuted, by Assistant State Attorney Dan Groth, for four counts of attempted murder, four counts of aggravated battery of a police officer, and two counts of discharging a firearm. The trial was conducted at Cook County criminal court building, with Judge Crane presiding.

The defense rested immediately after the prosecution's closing arguments, confident that their case had been made.

Morgan was found not guilty of battery and discharging a firearm. The jury was hung on the charges of attempted murder, resulting in mistrial. According to defense attorneys, ten jurors considered Morgan not guilty, but two would not accede to this judgment.

== 2012 trial ==
Morgan was found guilty of attempted murder in a re-trial taking place in January 2012. The trial was again presided over by Judge Crane and held at the Cook County Criminal Courts building in Chicago. The verdict was handed down on January 27; the jury took only 3 hours to decide.

Morgan was incarcerated and his bail bond was revoked. He planned to appeal.

== The case ==
=== Testimony ===
==== Wrigley, White, Finley, & Olsen ====
Officer Finley testified that at 12:35 AM on February 21, he and Officer Wrigley heard a sound that they believed to be a gunshot. He said they saw a van going the wrong way down a one-way street with its lights off. The officers followed it through several stop signs, then pulled it over. Finley says that he drew his gun as Morgan got out of his own car. Finley and Wrigley were joined by Olsen and White. Finley testified that Morgan complied with an order to put his hands on the van, but then began to struggle while being patted down. Finley describes an extended gunfight, during which Morgan fired at the officers from the ground. He explains the bullets in Morgan's back by saying that the officers were spread out, and so when Morgan stood up, he had to turn all around to shoot at them.

The other three officers gave similar testimony. Justin Dukes, a paramedic, testified that Morgan was combative and asked Dukes to "let him die."

Testimony from the four officers did not align on the question of whether Morgan was on his stomach or on his back, or on the question of when the officers stopped shooting.

==== Howard Morgan ====
Morgan testified that he did not fire at the officers, saying that they had pulled him from his car, guns already drawn, and pinned him to the ground. He said they found his gun while he was trying to produce his police identification.

Morgan also said he was complying with traffic laws and that his headlights were on.

==== Charice Rush ====
Charice Rush was the only eyewitness to step forward. She said that she was locked out of her house and waiting to be let in, when two police cars pulled up behind a van stopped at a stop sign. She says she saw police "snatch" Morgan out of his car and eventually shoot him. Rush testified that Morgan's hands were still behind his back when they started shooting.

Rush delivered a written statement to the police soon after the event. This statement contradicted some of her testimony; the defense argued that the written statement was heavily influenced by Catherine Nauher, the state attorney who solicited it.

The prosecution called Rush's testimony into question by invoking her young age (18) and inaccuracies in her testimony (she said she saw a female officer in the back of the second car).

==== Character witnesses ====
A number of character witnesses, including police officers, fellow churchgoers, and longtime friends, testified consistently that Morgan "was an honorable man."

=== Evidence ===
- Police photographs showing that the van's lights were actually on.
- The police said they believed Morgan's gun had been fired; the defense argued that no attempt was made to check Morgan's hands or the gun itself.

=== Arguments ===
Defense attorneys called attention to their relative inexperience, citing 10 total years among them.

Prosecutors argued that Morgan was actually afraid the officers would discover his expired firearm owners identification card.

Assistant State Attorney Dan Groth, who co-prosecuted the case in both trials, argued that the officers held back, saying "Every bullet [Morgan] got, he earned."

== Sentencing ==
On April 5, 2012, Judge Clayton J. Crane sentenced Morgan to 40 years in prison. Morgan had faced a possible sentence of 80 years; however, his attorney Herschella Conyers had also hoped that Crane would rule on the possibility of another trial.

Supporters, including Occupy Chicago demonstrated inside the courtroom. They stood when Morgan entered and some remained standing throughout the hearing.

Officer John Wrigley condemned Morgan at the hearing. Wrigley raised his voice to say, "You shot me, Morgan. You came very close to taking my life... you slandered our reputations as police officers. ... you are a fraud."

Judge Crane actually issued four sentences. One, 40 years, one, 35 years, and two for 25 years. These sentences were reported as 40 years because Morgan may serve them concurrently.

== Clemency ==
On his last day in office in January 2015, Illinois governor Pat Quinn commuted Morgan's sentence, which frees him from prison without pardoning him. He was released on January 14, 2015.

== Police reaction ==
The Chicago Police Department has been supportive of Wrigley, Finley, Olsen, and White, awarding them for valiant behavior in 2006. Chicago's Fraternal Order of Police celebrated the 2012 decision as "justice served." The FOP also encouraged supporters of the four officers to appear at Morgan's April 5 sentencing, dismissing the importance of race and accusing Chicago Sun-Times reporter Mary Mitchell of bias and of publishing intentionally misleading information.

Morgan's supporters have faulted the police department for crushing Morgan's car, which could have been used for evidence. Because Morgan was still in hospital and did not receive a claim letter sent to his house, his vehicle and the personal belongings it contained were destroyed without his consent. Police also did not produce 25 of the 28 bullets that pierced Morgan's body.

== Accusations of racism ==
Howard Morgan, his attorney Sam Adam Jr., and Charice Rush, the only witness to the event, are all black. The four other officers involved are all white. The twelve-person jury that found Morgan guilty had ten white members.

Ted Pearson, Co-chairperson of the Chicago Alliance Against Racist and Political Repression, said "This case reeks of the kind of white supremacy that shocked the nation 80 years ago when nine Black teenagers were falsely accused and sentenced to death in Alabama for the rape of two white girls on the flimsiest of evidence." Pearson believed that global outrage was necessary to free Morgan.

Morgan's supporters, including his wife, Rosalind, also complained about unfairness in the judicial process, arguing that Morgan's 2012 trial constitutes double jeopardy. Some close to the case compared the unfairness in the situation to the case surrounding the killing of Trayvon Martin. Efforts were mounted to raise national awareness of the case, particularly through social media, including a Change.org petition and the "Free Howard Morgan" website. Supporters planned to deliver petitions to U.S. Attorney General Eric Holder, as well as to Illinois and Cook County officials.
