= 1999 Washington NATO summit =

1999 NATO summit meeting in Washington, D.C., United States

1999 Washington summit
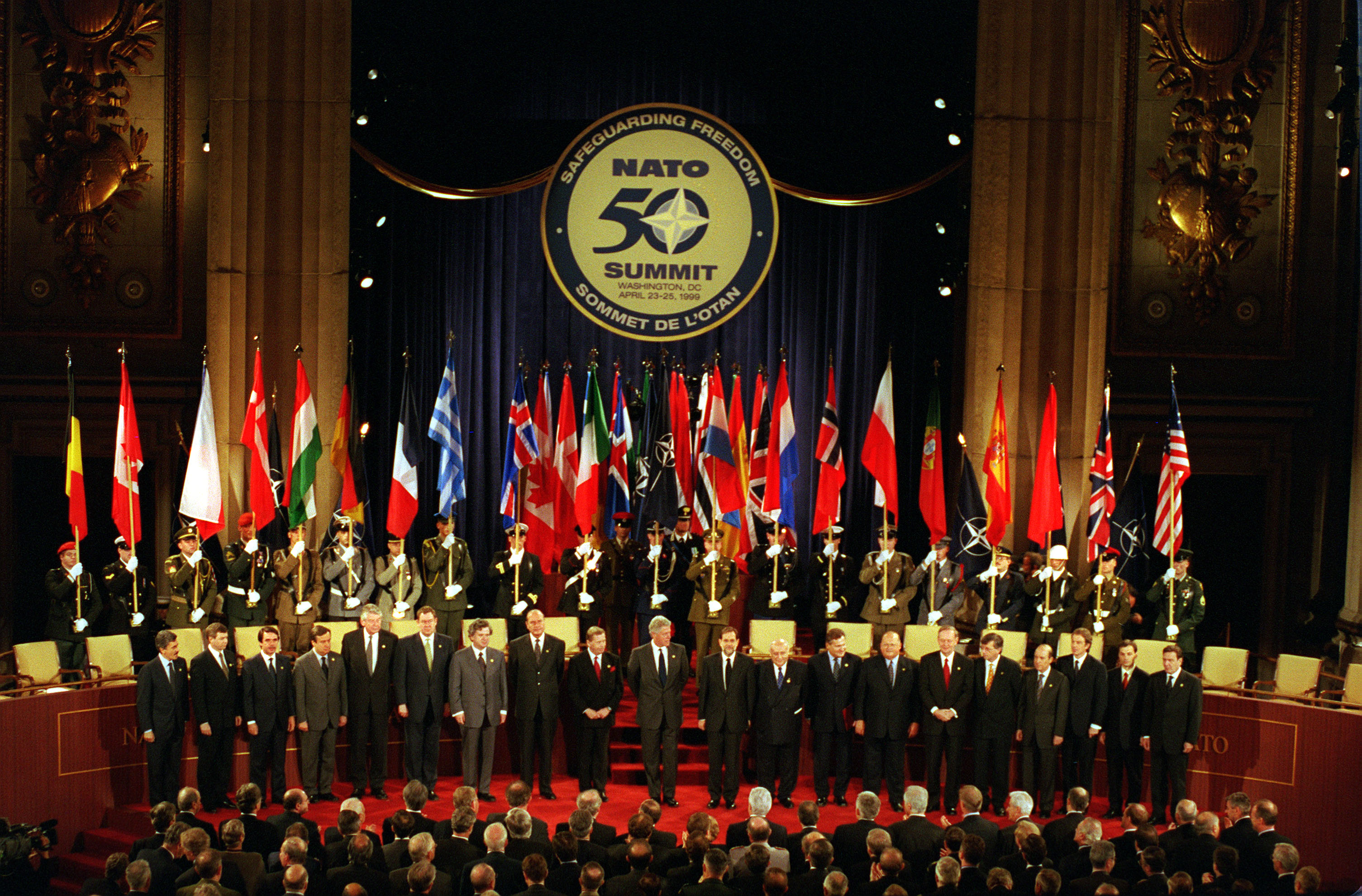
- Representatives of NATO's 19 members during the official photo to mark the organization's 50th anniversary, April 23, 1999, in Washington, DC, USA.
- Host country: United States
- Dates: April 24–25, 1999
- Venues: Andrew W. Mellon Auditorium

The 1999 Washington summit was the 16th NATO summit, a three-day meeting held in Washington, D.C., on April 23–25, 1999.

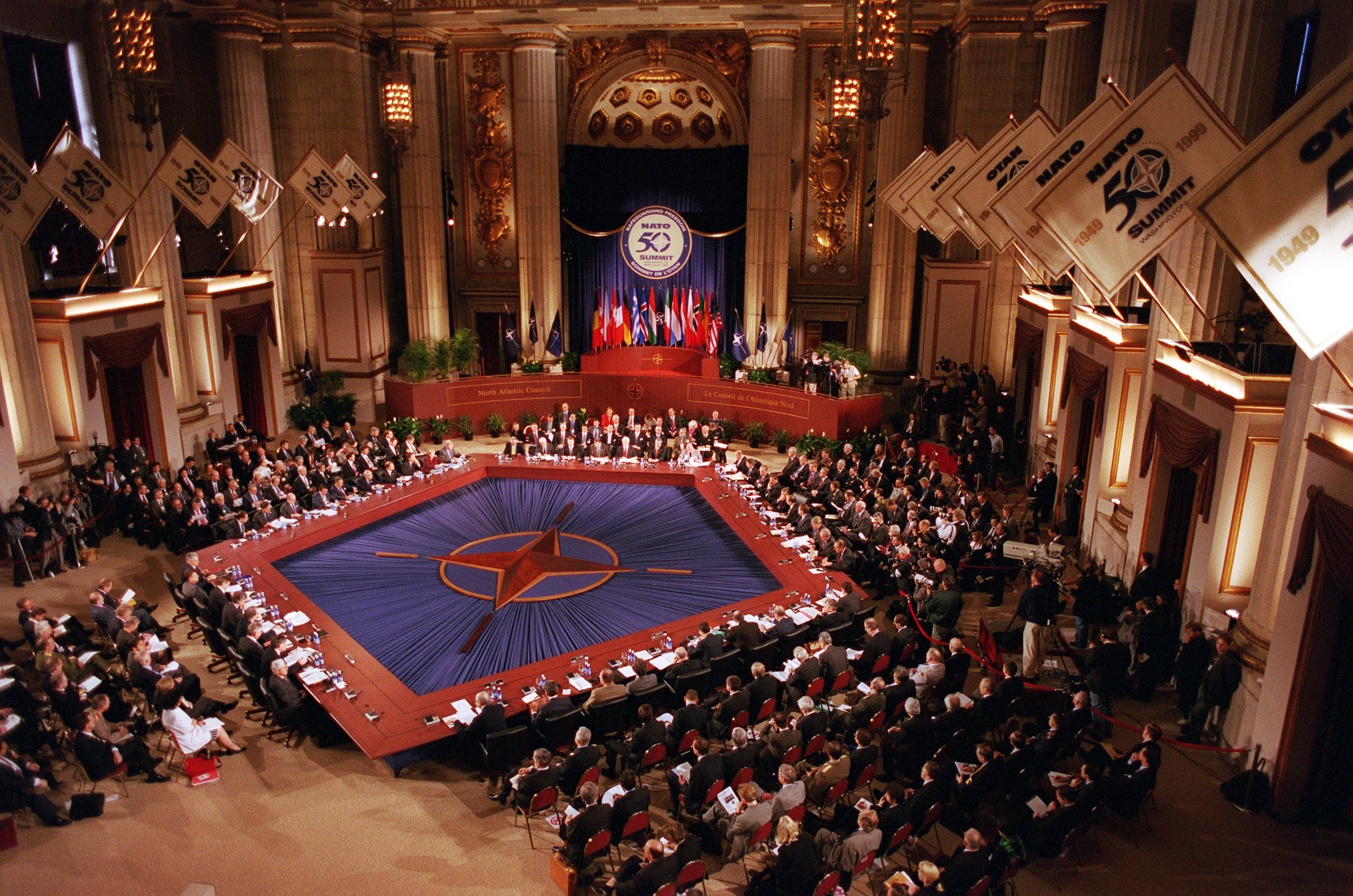
The venue for the 50th anniversary commemoration of the founding of NATO was Washington, DC's Andrew W. Mellon Auditorium, where the 12 founding members signed the treaty in April 1949.

Held at the height of the NATO bombing of Yugoslavia, the summit commemorated the 50th anniversary of NATO and reiterated the "determination to put an end to the repressive actions" by Serbian President Milošević against the local ethnic Albanian population in Kosovo. It was also the first summit in which three new NATO members (the Czech Republic, Hungary, and Poland) participated.

The Membership Action Plan (MAP), an important part of NATO's Open Door Policy, was adopted, and a revised version of the Strategic Concept was made public. The European Security and Defence Identity within NATO was also enhanced; the Defence Capabilities Initiative and the Weapons of Mass Destruction Initiative were launched. The Partnership for Peace, the Euro-Atlantic Partnership Council, and the Mediterranean Dialogue were strengthened.

== See also ==
- 1978 Washington summit
- 2012 Chicago summit
- 2024 Washington summit
