= Howard J. Morgan =

British portrait painter (1949–2020)

- Born: 21 April 1949; Denbigh, Wales
- Died: 22 September 2020 (aged 71)
- Known for: Portrait painting

Howard James Morgan (21 April 1949 – 22 September 2020) was a British portrait painter who painted three queens. His work is held in the collection of the National Portrait Gallery, London.

== Life and work ==
He was born in Denbigh, North Wales, the son of a lay preacher.

He specialised in portrait painting and was elected a member of the Royal Society of Portrait Painters in 1986. In addition to portraits however, he also executed a variety of landscapes and religious works.

In 2004, he married Sarah Milligan, an abstract painter, with whom he had three children, Velvet, a writer, author and poet, Perseus, a musician and Samuel, a film student. He was previously married to Susan Sandilands in 1977, with whom he had three children, Alexander, Romilly and Rupert.

== Portrait commissions ==
- Queen Elizabeth II
- Queen Elizabeth the Queen Mother (Butchers' Hall, London)
- Queen Wilhelmina of the Netherlands
- Prince Michael of Kent
- The Prince & Princess of Hanover
- Tom Stoppard
- Philip Larkin
- Francis Crick (National Portrait Gallery, London)
- Paul Maurice Dirac (National Portrait Gallery, London)
- Dame Antoinette Sibley (National Portrait Gallery, London)
- Herbert Norman Howells (National Portrait Gallery, London)
- Michael Haynes (401½ Studios)
