= 2012 Chicago NATO summit =

2012 NATO summit meeting in Chicago, Illinois, United States

2012 Chicago Summit NATO Summit Chicago 2012
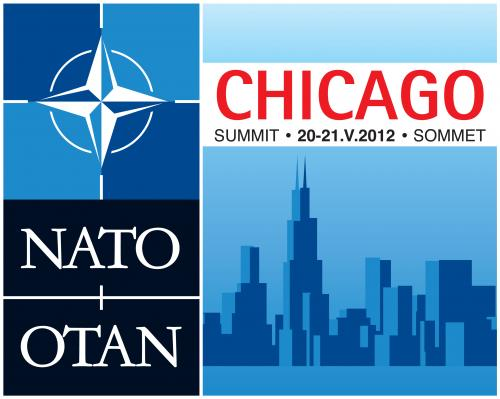
- Logo of the 2012 Chicago Summit
- Host country: United States
- Date: 20–21 May 2012
- Cities: Chicago
- Venues: McCormick Place
- Website: NATO Chicago Summit 2012

The 2012 Chicago summit was the summit of the heads of state and heads of government of the North Atlantic Treaty Organization (NATO), held in Chicago, Illinois, on 20 and 21 May 2012. This was the first time ever that a NATO summit was held in the United States outside of the nation's capital, Washington, D.C. The event was originally scheduled to coincide and be held after the 2012 G8 summit in Chicago as well, but the G8 summit was later rescheduled to be held at Camp David.

== Agenda ==
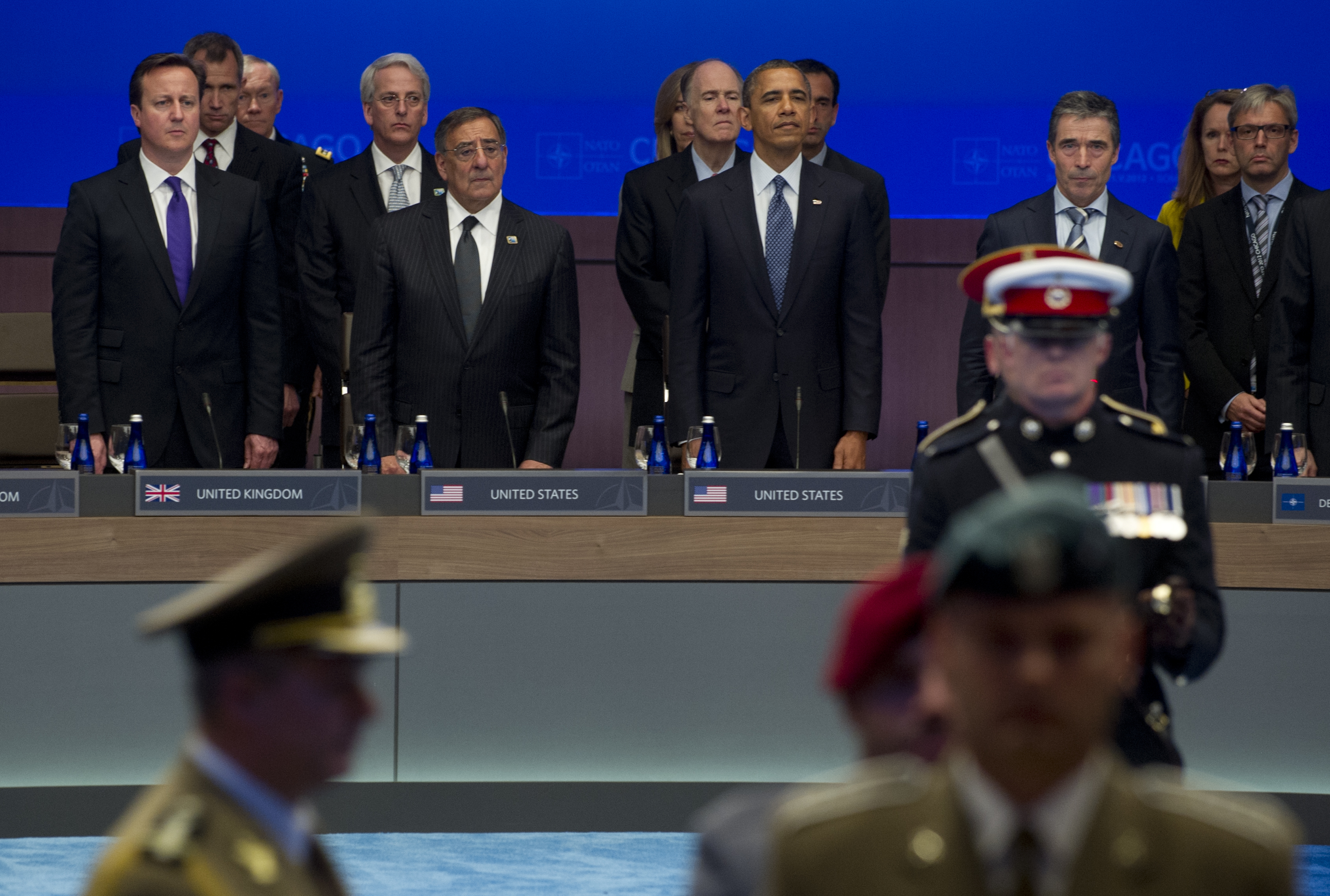
NATO leaders

The previous summit was the 2010 Lisbon summit. The summit in Chicago discussed the impact events such as the Arab Spring, 2011 Libyan Civil War, as well as the 2008 financial crisis, and transition for NATO forces in Afghanistan, and a missile shield system for Europe to seek routes out.

=== Middle East ===
NATO is planning to craft specific resolutions concerning the Middle East. Issues to address include the organization's continuing military support of active insurrections in the region, as well conflict with Iran. The group is going to make plans for defending certain areas, such as the Strait of Hormuz.

=== Nuclear weapons ===
NATO will also discuss missile defense and nuclear deterrence more generally.

NATO's secretary general Rasmussen has confirmed plans to proceed with ballistic missile defense, a system that would alter the longstanding balance of mutually assured destruction between the United States and Russia, but yet protect NATO-member nations from missile attacks from nations such as Iran or North Korea. Many years prior, NATO member the United States had informed Russia on several occasions that if Russia didn't limit its cooperation with the Iranian missile program, the defense shield would be necessary. Rasmussen announced that a successful test had been conducted in April 2012 of the missile defense system, and that further details about existing "interim capability" would be announced at the Chicago summit. This position has been changed since the Lisbon Summit, during which NATO powers ordered the creation of a "Deterrence and Defense Posture Review" (DDPR)—a document expected to express and discuss conflicts some of the wide-ranging conflicts on the topic within NATO.

The United States is also planning to upgrade 180 tactical nuclear weapons currently positioned in Europe. The upgrade would improve guidance systems on the missiles, rendering them able to hit targets more precisely.

Russia has requested that the NATO countries declare "adherence to the rules of international law" in the nuclear policy they agree upon at the Chicago summit. Russia has also announced that it may retaliate against the deployment of NATO's defense system by using Iskander theater ballistic missile weapons or by striking weapons sites in Europe, although experts believe Russia will not risk war with the United States and its NATO allies by attacking such targets.

=== Russia ===
Russia worries that its own nuclear arsenal could be rendered useless with the full activation of a missile shield by the United States. Russia's nuclear deterrent maintains a 'strategic balance' between the two major powers. But the United States insists that a defense system is necessary to mitigate any threat from Iran. In previous years, Russia had been invited on several occasions to work with NATO on defense systems, but declined. The organization also plans to review its collective relationship to Russia. Indeed, NATO has stated that Russia's attendance at the Chicago event will depend upon accession to a system of European missile defense.

=== Afghanistan war ===
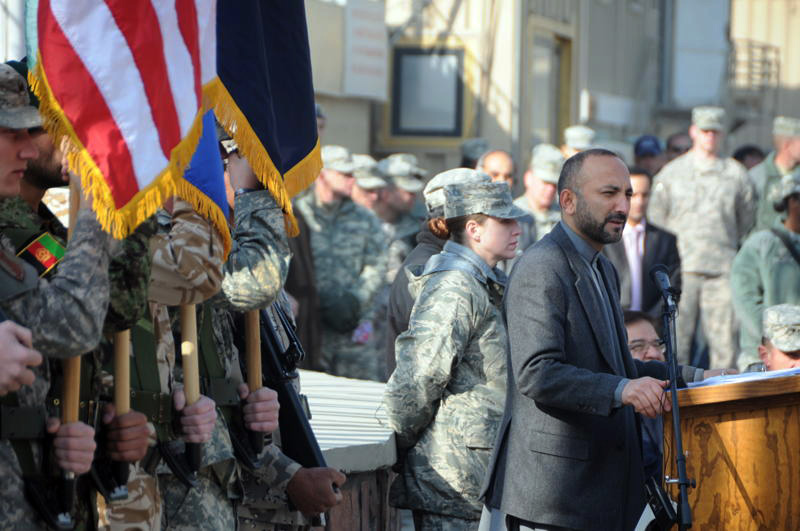
NATO command in Kabul

The Afghanistan issue in particular faces a public relations timeline due to a declaration by Barack Obama that NATO activities in Afghanistan would be concluded by 2014, but 28-nation military bloc was clearly divided, as the new French President, Francois Hollande, indicated that he will pull out all 3,400 French troops at the end of 2012 or 2 years ahead of NATO's timetable.

== Main topics and results ==
=== Afghanistan war ===
The leaders of the NATO-member countries endorsed on 21 May 2012 an exit strategy for the War in Afghanistan and declared their long-term commitment to Afghanistan. The NATO-led ISAF forces will hand over command of all combat missions to Afghan forces by the middle of 2013, while shifting at the same time from combat to a support role of advising, training and assisting the Afghan security forces and then withdraw most of the 130,000 foreign troops by the end of December 2014. A new and different NATO mission will then advise, train and assist the Afghan security forces including the Afghan Special Operations Forces. The pace of withdrawal will be determined by each country individually, but coordinated with coalition planners. According to a Western official, nations with troops in Afghanistan pledged roughly $1 billion to fund Afghan security forces after 2014, while the majority of the funding will come from the United States. This was confirmed by a report of the Los Angeles Times which stated that according to British Prime Minister David Cameron, Australia, Denmark, Germany, Italy, the Netherlands, Estonia and others had made pledges that added "almost" $1 billion. However, these figures changed later as in June 2012 news media like The Globe and Mail, The Herald Sun, Al Jazeera English, The Washington Post, Shanghai Daily and BBC News Online published that at the NATO Chicago summit an annual aid of 4.1 billion U.S. dollars was pledged to pay for ongoing training, equipment and financial support for Afghanistan's security forces after 2014.

=== Smart Defense ===
As consequence of shrinking defense budgets the NATO leaders agreed to share the costs of weapons and equipment as part of a so-called "Smart Defense" initiative. The NATO leaders approved 20 projects for this initiative. These projects cover the funding for remotely controlled robots used to clear roads of homemade bombs or mines, the creation of a pool of maritime patrol planes from a number of nations, the creation of a joint management of munitions for buying and storage of munitions, maintenance of armored vehicles, sharing of medical facilities, common management of fuel handling, cooperation in the use of surveillance aircraft with joint training for intelligence specialists and purchase of Global Hawk surveillance drones operated by NATO in the name of all its member states. "Together, we will keep NATO capable of responding to the security challenges of tomorrow, because no country, no continent can deal with them alone," Secretary General of NATO Anders Fogh Rasmussen told the leaders ahead of the discussion about budget cuts. "We can find common solutions to common problems." Rasmussen explained the reason behind the "Smart Defense" initiative is that the military must do more with less in a time of budget cuts due to NATO members need to save money in the time of the Great Recession.

Anders Fogh Rasmussen's "Smart Defense" initiative, which advocates "pooling and sharing resources, setting better priorities and encouraging countries to specialize in things they are best at," was inspired after the remarks made by U.S. Secretary of Defense Robert Gates in June 2011, who stated that NATO faced "the real possibility [of] a dim, if not dismal future" because of chronically underfunded defense apparatuses in Europe. Only four European countries—Great Britain, France, Albania, and Greece—have committed to the alliance's agreed benchmark of committing two percent of their GDP to defense. The United States, which contributes three-quarters to NATO's operating budget, is experiencing severe budgetary problems while simultaneously re-balancing military commitments to the Pacific, further straining the Atlantic alliance. "Current projections show the U.S. defense budget shrinking by $487 billion in the decade to come, with another half trillion in cuts possible depending on the outcome of the highly partisan negotiations over future reductions to the federal deficit."

Smart Defense is intended to make Europe more responsible for European security and the European periphery as the United States military withdraws from the continent. NATO's Libya operation may be a model for such engagement: "The United States will do what it must—playing roles and providing surge capabilities that only it can provide—and Europe will bear the rest of the burden for operations that are more in its own interests than those of the United States." Because Europe is not experiencing an existential threat like it did during the Cold War, the preponderance of U.S. assets for military campaigns that do not fall under Article 5 will diminish.

Skepticism of Smart Defense is plenty. Francois Heisburg, chairman of The International Institute for Strategic Studies (IISS) and of the Geneva Centre for Security Policy says that governments typically choose "jobs in defense companies at home over [the] military logic" of pooling resources. Former Ambassador to NATO and Professor at Harvard Kennedy School, R. Nicholas Burns recognizes the structural troubles facing NATO but is nonetheless optimistic, stating "Investment in an alliance that in large measure denationalizes defense, and contains or resolves old antagonism through family arguments around NATO's kitchen table, provides a remarkable rate of return."

=== Missile defence ===
During the 2010 Lisbon summit NATO members agreed to establish a missile defense system that would have the capability of covering all member states in Europe, as well as the United States and Canada. In Chicago NATO leaders declared that this system has reached interim capability. Interim capability means that a basic command and control capability has been tested and installed at NATO's Headquarters Allied Air Command in Ramstein, Germany, while NATO Allies provide sensors and interceptors to connect to the system. It also means that US ships with anti-missile interceptors in the Mediterranean Sea and a Turkey-based radar system have been put under NATO command in the German base. "Our system will link together missile defence assets from different Allies – satellites, ships, radars and interceptors – under NATO command and control. It will allow us to defend against threats from outside the Euro-Atlantic area", NATO Secretary General Anders Fogh Rasmussen said.

The NATO missile defense system was expected to have limited capability by 2015 and to be fully operational by 2018. NATO's long-term goal is to merge missile defence assets provided by individual allies into a coherent defence system so that full coverage and protection for all NATO European populations, territory and forces against the threats posed by proliferation of ballistic missiles is ensured. This goal is expected to be realised sometime between the end of the 2010s and the beginning of the 2020s. To this end Spain will host four US Aegis warships at its port in Rota while Poland and Romania have agreed to host US land-based SM-3 missiles in the coming years.

== Protests ==
Amateur video of protest, 20 May 2012

Several thousand protestors marched through downtown Chicago until they reached as close as they could to the buildings where the NATO leaders were meeting. There, in a historic throwback to Vietnam War protesters, 50 members of Iraq Veterans Against the War threw medals they had received during missions in Afghanistan and Iraq in a symbol of resistance and denunciation. Each veteran expressed their reasons for leaving the army and their experiences in the wars as they hurled their medals in the direction of where the summit was taking place. Representing the voices of the Afghan civilians impacted by the war, Samira Sayed-Rahman, Suraia Sahar and Sabz Maher of Afghans for Peace attended the week of actions and spoke to the crowd following the veterans ceremony. The three women are Toronto and U.S. based-activists who consulted with organizers during the planning of the protests and collaborated with the soldiers and veterans on how best to conduct the medal ceremony so as to respect the victims of the wars.

Planners expected the NATO summit to draw protesters from the Occupy movement, as well as the anti-globalization movement, and many protesters from around the world. Some parochial schools near the downtown meeting site had considered closing for the event. However, no Chicago Public Schools were closed for the event, not even those near the downtown site.

=== Citizen journalism ===
A range of groups was in the city to organize citizen journalism centers to provide independent media coverage of the summit.

Alderman Rick Munoz had proposed legislation for the City Council that prohibits police from interfering with online media and cell phones during the event. However, that legislation was not passed.

== Security ==
=== Police forces ===
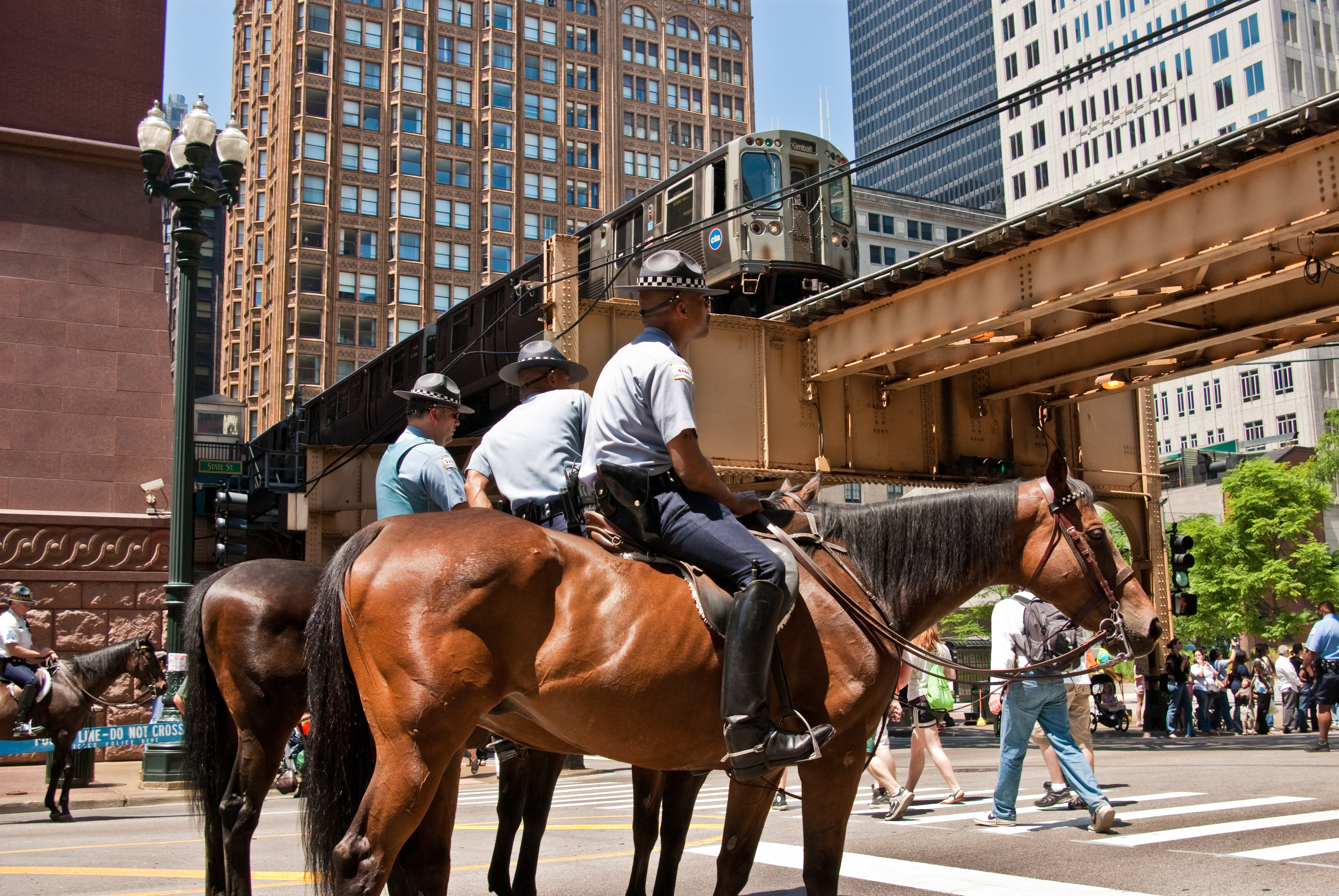
Chicago mounted police, 2010

The summit was designated a National Special Security Event (NSSE) by the Department of Homeland Security. Final authority over law enforcement thus belonged to the Secret Service of the United States. The NSSE steering committee, which also included representatives from the Chicago Police Department and has 24 subcommittees, began meeting in October 2011.

Local security forces were trained by an Illinois company, Controlled F.O.R.C.E., which specializes in subduing crowds if necessary. Police are being trained in "Mechanical Advantage Control Holds", as well as the use of tasers.

The city signed a $193,461 contract for the procurement of new face shields that fit over gas masks; the shields were intended to protect police officers from liquids. The Chicago Police Department also prepared its mounted unit with riot gear: armor for horses along with "crowd control training".

=== New Chicago rules ===
Chicago mayor Rahm Emanuel proposed and passed new ordinances. These ordinances are permanent, remaining in effect after the summits are over. The new measures include:

- Authorization for the mayor to purchase and deploy surveillance cameras throughout the city.
- Restrictions on public activity, including amplified sound and morning gatherings.
- Restrictions on parades, including the requirement to purchase an insurance policy worth $1 million and to register every sign or banner that will be held by more than one person.
- Allow the Chicago Police Superintendent to deputize many different types of law enforcement personnel other than the Chicago Police Department if this becomes necessary.

These new ordinances drew protests from the ACLU, Amnesty International, and the Occupy Movement (particularly Occupy Chicago). Some local business owners have asked for more retail security during the summit.

=== HR 347 ===
HR 347, a federal law also known as the Federal Restricted Buildings and Grounds Improvement Act, was also modified at this time—essentially a Washington, DC update on an already existing law. The law already protected those under the Secret Service's protection, except in Washington, DC where these protections fell under the local law for trespassing. The Secret Service requested the change because it was not a federal violation to jump the White House fence and run across the lawn, but the modification now makes it a federal violation. Mara Verheyden-Hilliard, executive director of the Partnership for Civil Justice Fund, contends the modification can somehow be used against protesters and has argued that this law only plays a small part in a larger campaign against free speech.

== Summit costs ==
The city of Chicago presented on 29 June 2012 a bill for nearly $15.6 million in expenses for the May NATO summit – in part to one of its own agencies – and said more bills are coming. In a series of letters, the city formally requested that units of the state and federal governments and World Business Chicago, the public/private group that served as the summit host committee, reimburse it for $15,578,267.33 in expenses. Almost all of that was for the police department, which wracked up millions of dollars in overtime, training and related costs. The city seeks payment of $14.6 million for police services. The remainder of the bill, a little less than $1 million, is for fire department services. Sarah Hamilton, Mayor Rahm Emanuel's communications director, described the bill as "our first reimbursement request," with more to come. "We will make others and plan to have all reimbursements submitted within the month," she said in an email, but added that the 29 June bill represent most of what eventually will be requested.

== Member states leaders and other dignitaries in attendance ==
- Albania – Prime Minister Sali Berisha
- Belgium – Prime Minister Elio Di Rupo
- Bulgaria – President Rosen Plevneliev
- Canada – Prime Minister Stephen Harper
- Croatia – President Ivo Josipović
- Czech Republic – Prime Minister Petr Nečas
- Denmark – Prime Minister Helle Thorning-Schmidt
- Estonia – Prime Minister Andrus Ansip
- France – President François Hollande
- Germany – Chancellor Angela Merkel
- Greece – Prime Minister Panagiotis Pikrammenos
- Hungary – Prime Minister Viktor Orbán
- Iceland – Prime Minister Jóhanna Sigurðardóttir
- Italy – Prime Minister Mario Monti
- Latvia – President Andris Bērziņš
- Lithuania – President Dalia Grybauskaitė
- Luxembourg – Prime Minister Jean-Claude Juncker
- Netherlands – Prime Minister Mark Rutte
- Norway – Prime Minister Jens Stoltenberg
- Poland – President Bronisław Komorowski
- Portugal – Prime Minister Pedro Passos Coelho
- Romania – President Traian Băsescu
- Slovakia – President Ivan Gašparovič
- Slovenia – Prime Minister Janez Janša
- Spain – Prime Minister Mariano Rajoy
- Turkey – President Abdullah Gül
- United Kingdom – Prime Minister David Cameron
- United States – President Barack Obama
- NATO – Secretary General Anders Fogh Rasmussen

=== Non-member states and organisations ===
- Afghanistan – President Hamid Karzai
- Armenia – President Serzh Sargsyan
- Australia – Prime Minister Julia Gillard
- Austria – President Heinz Fischer
- Azerbaijan – President Ilham Aliyev
- Bosnia and Herzegovina – Chairman of the Presidency Bakir Izetbegović
- Cyprus – President Demetris Christofias
- Finland – President Sauli Niinistö
- Georgia – President Mikheil Saakashvili
- Ireland – Taoiseach Enda Kenny
- Macedonia – Prime Minister Nikola Gruevski
- Malta – Prime Minister Lawrence Gonzi
- Moldova – President Nicolae Timofti
- Montenegro – President Filip Vujanović
- Pakistan – President Asif Ali Zardari
- Serbia – President Tomislav Nikolić
- Sweden – Prime Minister Fredrik Reinfeldt
- Switzerland – Federal Council Ueli Maurer
- Ukraine – President Viktor Yanukovych
- European Union – President of the European Council Herman Van Rompuy
- European Union – President of the European Commission José Manuel Barroso
