= List of international trips made by Ed Miliband as Foreign Secretary =

Foreign Secretary Ed Miliband

This is a list of international visits undertaken by Ed Miliband during his tenure as the Foreign Secretary, to which he was appointed 20 July 2026. The list includes both private travel and official visits. The list includes only foreign travel which the Foreign Secretary made during his tenure.

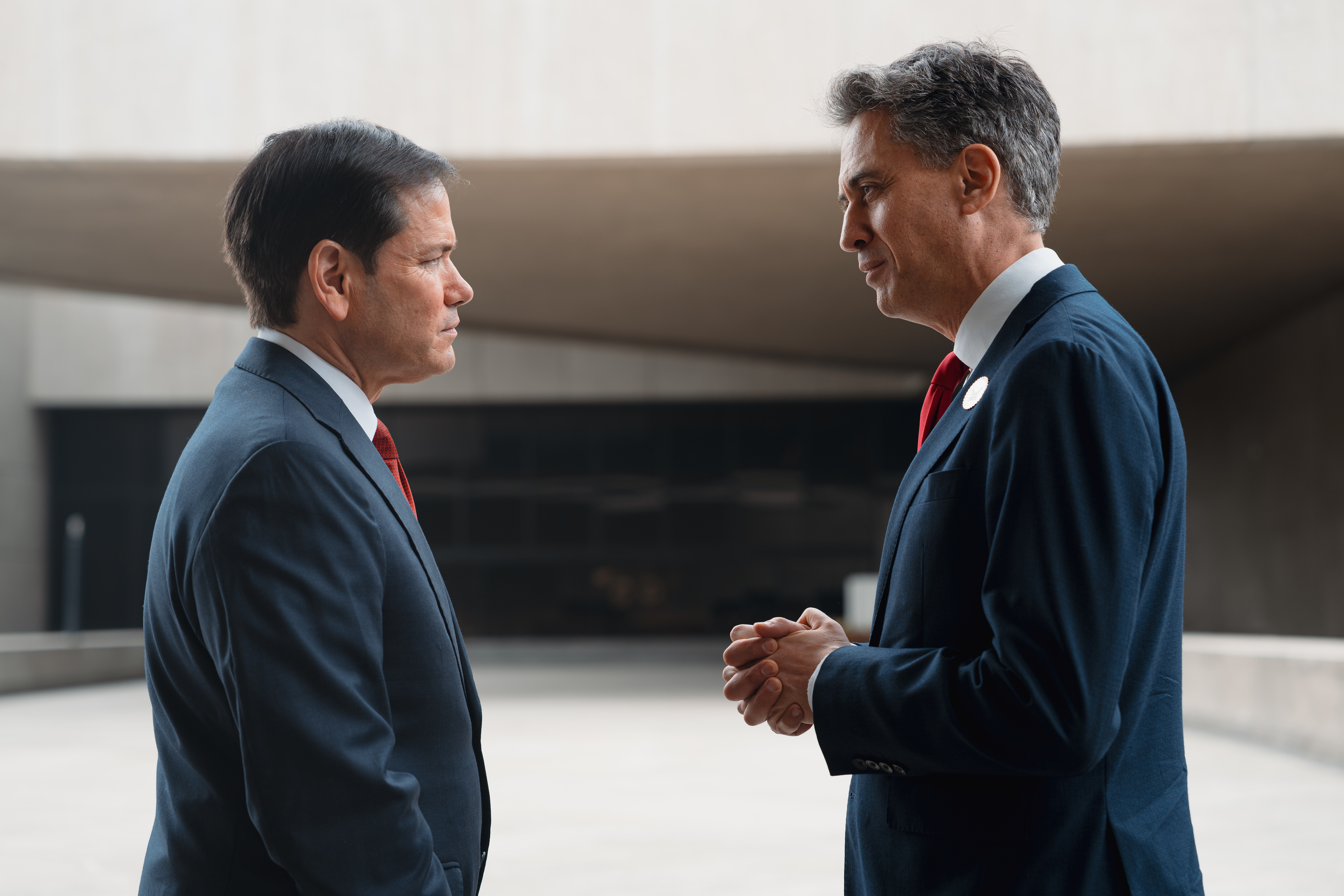
Miliband with US Secretary of State Marco Rubio in Manila on 23 July 2026.

== Summary ==
Miliband has visited 8 countries so far during his tenure as Foreign Secretary. The number of visits per country where Secretary Miliband has traveled are:

- One visit to France, Ireland, The Philippines, Poland, Qatar, Spain, Ukraine
- Two visits to the United States

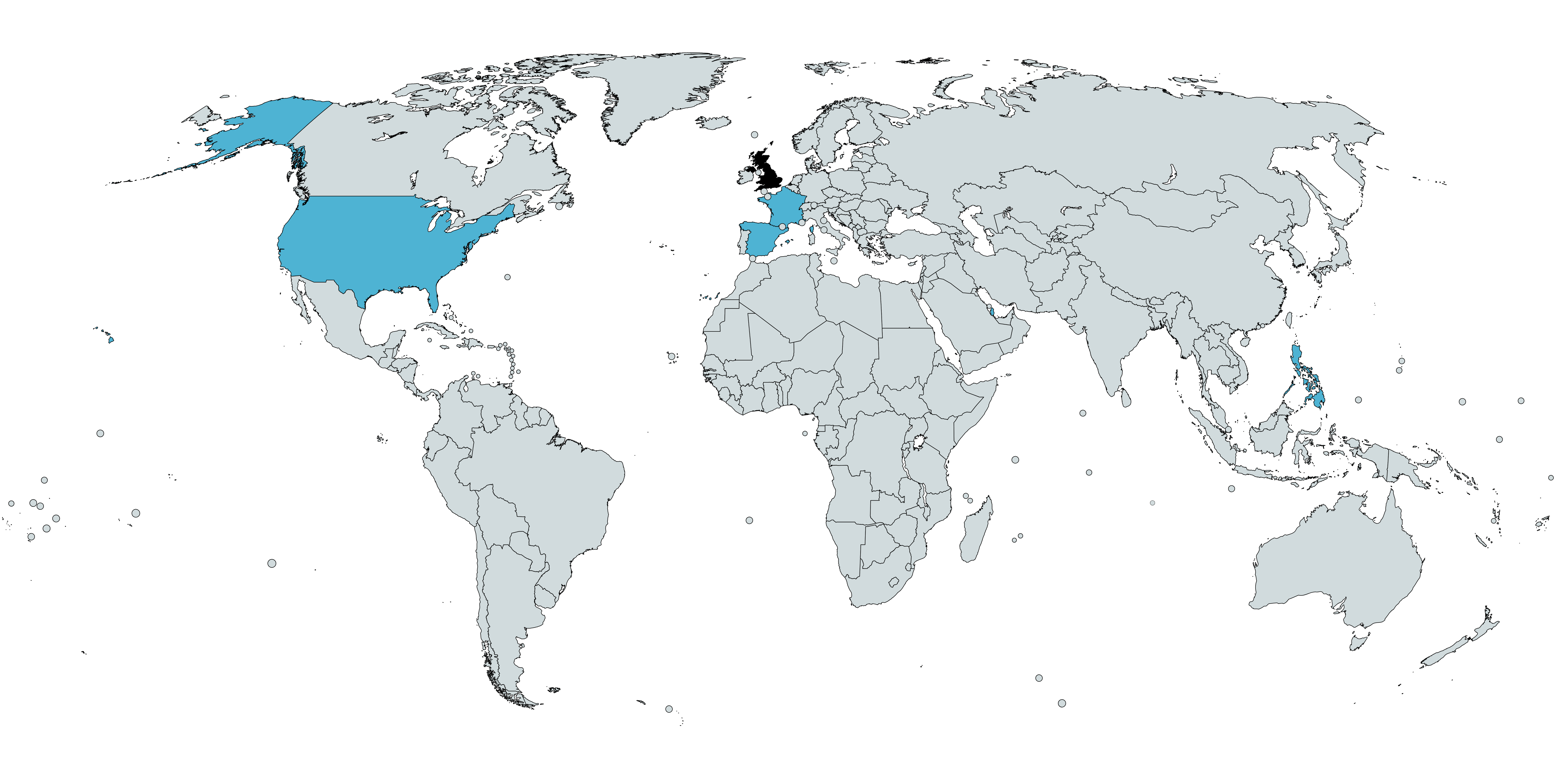
Map of international trips made by Ed Miliband as Foreign Secretary – as of July 2026: United Kingdom 1 visit

== Table ==
Trip	Country	Locations	Dates	Details
1	Philippines	Manila, Pasay	22–23 July 2026	As his first official foreign visit following his appointment, Miliband visited Manila for the ASEAN Foreign Ministers meeting and attended the ASEAN-UK Post-Ministerial Conference.While there he also met with U.S Secretary of State Marco Rubio for the first time in his new role. During the meeting, he called for the de-escalation of the Iran war. He said that any diplomatic settlement should reopen the Strait of Hormuz and uphold freedom of navigation. Miliband also welcomed the Islamabad Memorandum providing toll-free passage through the strait for 60 days, although its implementation stalled following Iranian attacks on tankers in the area.
2	Qatar	Doha	24 July 2026	Met with Qatari Prime Minister and Minister of Foreign Affairs Mohammed bin Abdulrahman bin Jassim Al Thani to discuss bilateral relations, and security in the Middle East including issues around the Strait of Hormuz.
3	France	Paris	29 July 2026	First European visit. Met with French counterpart Jean-Noël Barrot.
3	Spain	Madrid	29 July 2026	Met with Spanish counterpart José Manuel Albares and signed agreement on fighting climate change.
4	United States	Washington, D.C.	5 August 2026	First visit to America. Met with Secretary of State Marco Rubio and other American politicians, after Rubio had invited him to visit the Capitol. They discussed the Gaza war and issues around the opening of the strait of Hormuz.
5	Ireland	Wicklow	2 September 2026	Attended the EU Gymnich meeting, of Foreign Ministers.
6	United States	New York	23-24 September 2026	Attended the UN General Assembly and spoke about the importance of implementing the Two-state solution to the Israel-Palestine conflict. He also returned the UK's climate report and met with the Iranian Foreign Minister Abbas Araghchi to discuss Iranian threats on British soil.
7	Ukraine	Kyiv	8 October 2026	Reaffirmed the UK's unwavering backing for Ukraine on first visit as Foreign Secretary, met with both President Volodymyr Zelenskyy and Foreign Minister Andrii Sybiha.
8	Poland	Warsaw	13 October 2026	Attended the Warsaw Security Forum, taking part in a panel discussion with German Foreign Minister Johann Wadephul, Norwegian Foreign Minister Espen Barth Eide and Polish Foreign Minister Radoslaw Sikorski, who all criticised President Trump's recent real with Russia on diseal.

== See also ==
- List of international prime ministerial trips made by Andy Burnham
- List of international prime ministerial trips made by Keir Starmer
- List of international trips made by foreign secretaries of the United Kingdom
- List of international trips made by David Lammy as Foreign Secretary of the United Kingdom
- List of international trips made by Yvette Cooper as Foreign Secretary of the United Kingdom
