= List of international trips made by Yvette Cooper as Foreign Secretary =

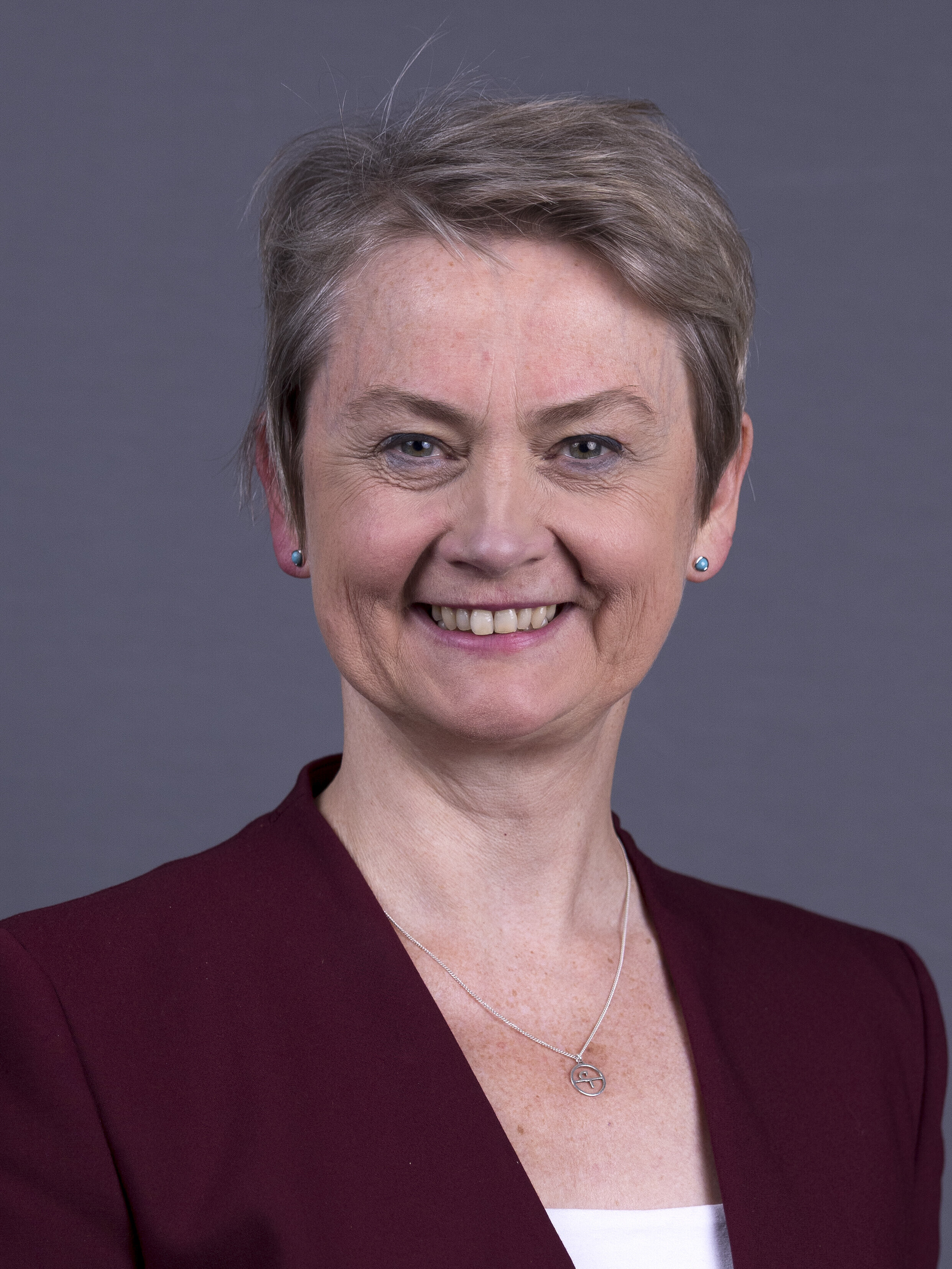
Foreign Secretary Yvette Cooper

This is a list of international visits undertaken by Yvette Cooper while she served as the Foreign Secretary from 5 September 2025 until 20 July 2026. The list includes both private travel and official visits. The list includes only foreign travel which the Foreign Secretary made during her tenure.

Her tenure included notably less foreign travel then her immediate Labour predecessor, David Lammy. He visited some 56 countries and territories over his 14 months in post, compared with her visiting 26 countries and territories over her 10 months. This was likely partially due to the instability caused by the 2026 Labour Party leadership crisis, which occupied much of the first half of 2026 in UK politics.

== Summary ==
Cooper visited 26 countries during her tenure as Foreign Secretary. The number of visits per country where Secretary Cooper has traveled are:

- One visit to Bahrain, Canada, Chad, China, Egypt, Ethiopia, Finland, Greece, India, Italy, Japan, Jordan, Moldova, Norway, Poland, Saudi Arabia, Sweden, Switzerland, the United Arab Emirates, the Vatican City.
- Two visits to Turkey and Ukraine
- Three visits to Belgium and Germany
- Four visits to the United States
- Five visits to France

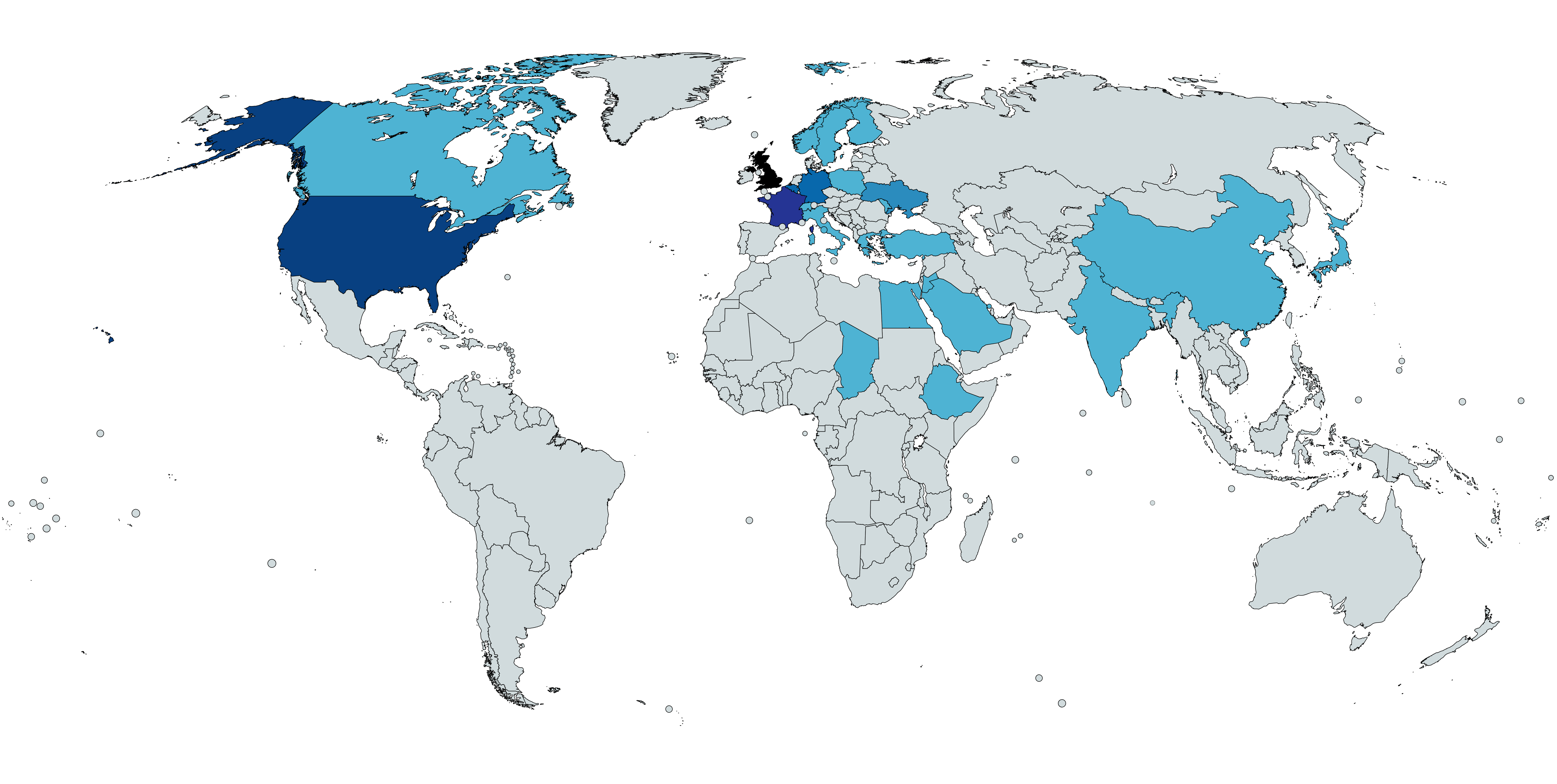
Map of international trips made by Yvette Cooper as Foreign Secretary – July 2026: United Kingdom 5+ visits 4 visits 3 visits 2 visits 1 visit

== Table ==
	Country	Locations	Dates	Details
1	Ukraine	Kyiv	12 September 2025	Announced £142 million in UK aid. Met with President Volodymyr Zelenskyy, Foreign Minister Andrii Sybiha and Prime Minister Yulia Svyrydenko.
2	United States	New York City	22–25 September 2025	Attended the 80th United Nations General Assembly and met with other G7 Foreign Ministers.
3	France	Paris	6 October 2025	Met with French Minister for Europe and Foreign Affairs Jean-Noël Barrot.
3	Belgium	Brussels	6 October 2025	Met with the Secretary General of NATO Mark Rutte and Belgian Foreign Minister Maxime Prévot.
4	France	Paris	9–10 October 2025	Attended a ministerial meeting on the Gaza war peace plan.
5	Vatican City	Vatican City	22–23 October 2025	Accompanied Their Majesties The King and Queen on their State visit to the Holy See. Gave a reading at a special ecumenical service in the Sistine Chapel.
6	Bahrain	Manama	6 November 2025	Attended the 21st Manama Dialogue.
6	Jordan	Amman	6 November 2025	Travelled to Jordan to meet with King Abdullah II and Foreign Minister Ayman Safadi, as well as humanitarian leaders and discuss Gaza aid and the on-going Gaza ceasefire. Announced £6 million in new UK funding for crisis maternity funding for women in conflict zones, including Gaza and £1 million in UK funding going to train Palestinian Security Forces based in the West Bank.
7	Canada	Niagara	11-12 November 2025	Attended a meeting of the G7 Foreign Ministers, hosted by Canada.
8	Italy	Naples	16-17 November 2025	Visited the UK Carrier Strike Group with the Defence Secretary John Healey and met with her Italian counterpart Antonio Tajani.
9	Germany	Berlin	20 November 2025	Met with her German counterpart Johann Wadephul to discuss illegal migration and people smuggling.
10	Belgium	Brussels	3 December 2025	Attended the NATO Foreign Ministers meeting and pledged £10million to the Ukraine Humanitarian Fund.
11	USA	Washington, D.C.	7-8 December 2025	Met with her American counterpart Marco Rubio to discuss the situation in Gaza and American peace proposals for Ukraine.
12	Belgium	Brussels	10 December 2025	To attend the Global Alliance to Counter Migrant Smuggling conference.
13	Greece	Athens	19 December 2025	Met with her Greek counterpart and discussed Ukraine, Sudan, the Middle East and illegal migration.
14	Finland	Helsinki	14 January 2026	FMet with Finnish counterpart and met with Finnish border guards onboard the Turva.
14	Norway	Camp Viking	15 January 2026	Visited UK marines training at Camp Viking and discussed Arctic security with her Norwegian counterpart, as well as Norway;s recent purchases oof UK Type 26 frigates.
14	France	Versailles	16 January 2026	VBilateral meeting with Foreign Minister Jean-Noël Barrot, and attendance at the Franco-British Colloque Conference 2026.
15	Switzerland	Davos	21 January 2026	To attend the 56th World Economic Forum in Davos.
16	Ethiopia	Addis Ababa	2 February 2026	First official visit to Africa in role. Met with Ethiopian counterpart Gedion Timothewos to discuss illegal migration and economic development.
16	Chad	Adré	3 February 2026	Visited refugees from the Sudanese civil war (2023–present) across the border in Chad. Announced £20 million of UK funding to support survivors of conflict-related sexual violence to access medical and psychological support in Sudan.Also met with the Foreign Ministers of Ethiopia, Kenya, South Sudan, Chad, and the African Union's Chairperson and Peace and Security Commissioner.
17	Germany	Munich	13-15 February 2026	To attend the Munich Security Conference.
18	USA	New York City	18 February 2026	Spoke at the UN on the ongoing situation in the Middle East.
19	Ukraine	Kyiv	23-24 February 2026	Visit to Kyiv on the fourth anniversary of Russia's invasion of Ukraine..
20	Saudi Arabia	Riyadh	12 March 2026	Visited in the context of the 2026 Iran war to express solidarity with Gulf partners.
21	France	Vaux-de-Cernay	26 March 2026	Attended the G7 Foreign Ministers meeting, princially discussed the ongoing 2026 Iran war.
22	Germany	Berlin	15 April 2026	Attended the international Sudan conference, marking the third anniversary of the war in Sudan, announced £146 million of UK aid and called for a ceasefire.
23	Turkey	Antalya	17 April 2026	Attended the Antalya Diplomacy Forum.
23	United Arab Emirates	Abu Dhabi	18 April 2026	Visited to discuss strengthening cooperation in the contexct on ongoing threats from Iran.
23	Japan	Tokyo	19-20 April 2026	Chaired the 10th annual UK-Japan Strategic Dialogue with her Japanese counterpart Minister Toshimitsu Motegi. Discussions focussed on Defnece and Security cooperation, with a 2+2 including both nations defence ministers promised within the year, as well as the situation in Iran and trade, including the Comprehensive and Progressive Agreement for Trans-Pacific Partnership. This trip was originally intended to be longer and include a visit to Gulf Allies to discuss ongoing UK-France efforts to build a coalition to police the Straits of Hormuz. This was ultimately cut from the program.
24	United States	Washington, D.C., New York City	27-30 April 2026	Accompanied Charles III on his state visit.
25	Moldova	Chișinău	14 May 2026	Travelled to Moldova to discuss a more modern interpretation of the European Convention on Human Rights (ECHR).
26	Sweden	Stockholm	22 May 2026	Travelled to Sweden for a meeting of NATO Foreign Ministers.
27	China	Beijing, Shenzhen	2-3 June 2026	Travelled to meet with Chinese Foreign Minister Wang Yi and Vice President Han Zheng.
27	India	New Delhi	3-5 June 2026	Travelled to meet with Indian Prime Minister Narendra Modi and External Affairs Minister S. Jaishankar.
28	France	Paris	12 June 2026	Trilateral meeting with French Foreign Minister Jean-Noël Barrot and Canadian Foreign Minister Anita Anand.
29	Egypt	Cairo	17-18 June 2026	Expanding a £9 million North Africa migration support programme.
30	Poland	Gdańsk	25 June 2026	Attended the Ukraine recovery conference and announced a new package of aid worth £290 million to bolster Ukraine's energy and recovery.
31	Turkey	Ankara	7–8 July 2026	Attended the 2026 Ankara NATO summit.

== See also ==
- List of international prime ministerial trips made by Keir Starmer
- List of international trips made by foreign secretaries of the United Kingdom
- List of international trips made by David Lammy as Foreign Secretary of the United Kingdom
