= 2026 state visit by Keir Starmer to China =

State visit by the British prime minister

2026 visit by Keir Starmer to China
- Part of China–United Kingdom relations
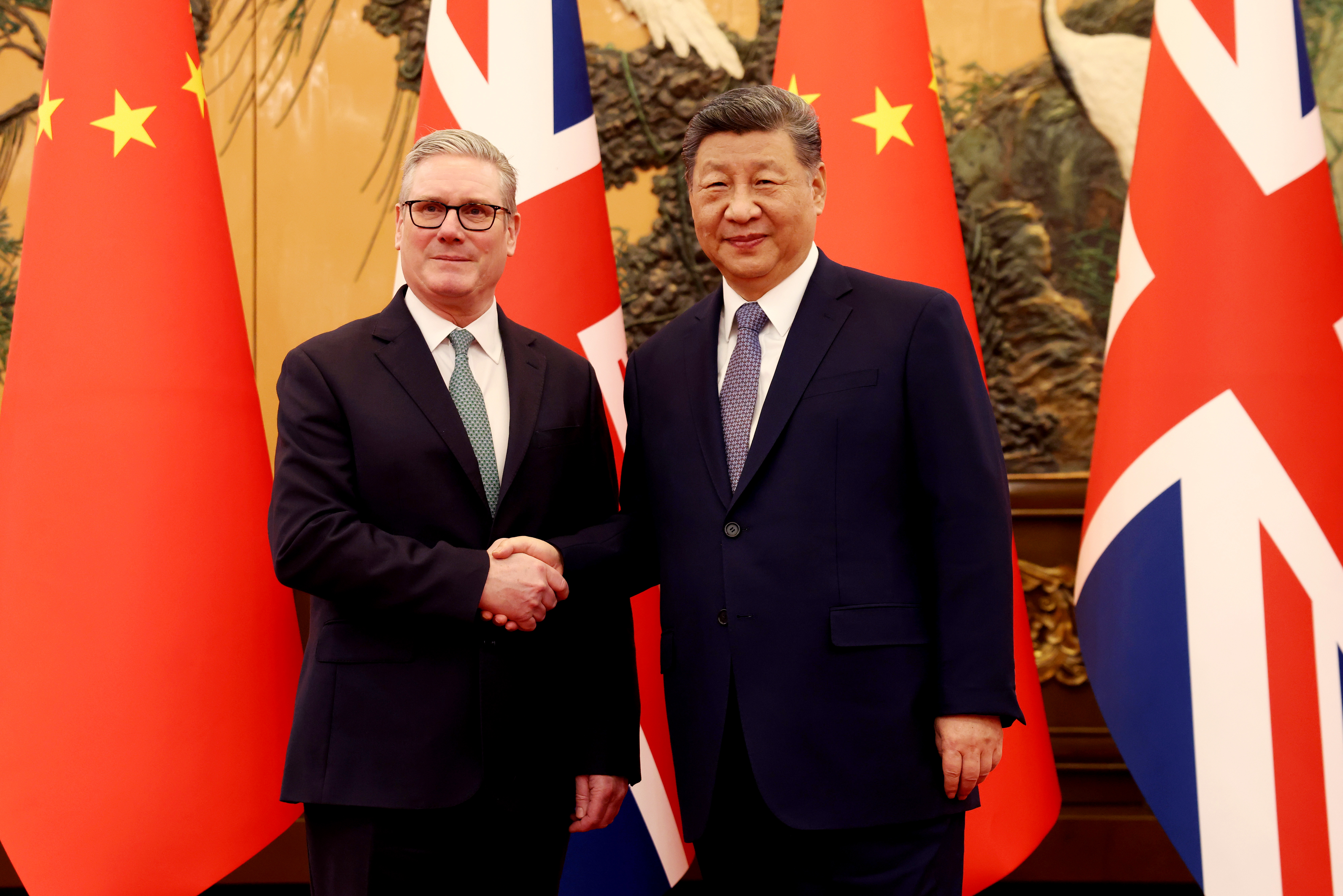
- Starmer with Xi Jinping
- Date: 28 to 31 January 2026
- Location: Beijing and Shanghai, China
- Type: Official visit

From 28 to 31 January 2026, British Prime Minister Keir Starmer paid a three-day state visit to China. This was the first official visit by a Prime Minister of the United Kingdom to China in eight years since Prime Minister Theresa May's visit in 2018. Starmer's trip was seen as an important step in the Labour government's reshaping of its China policy. Its main goal was to repair the bilateral relationship that had fallen into a slump in recent years and to seek to establish a cooperation framework that he described as "more mature" and with long-term stability.

Against the backdrop of rapid changes in the global political and economic environment and the uncertain prospects of United States foreign policy, Keir Starmer pointed out that the United Kingdom could not ignore China as the world's second-largest economy. He said the UK government would pragmatically seize the opportunity for economic cooperation with China while adhering to the bottom line of national security. During his visit, Starmer met with Chinese President Xi Jinping and Chinese Premier Li Qiang in Beijing. The two sides agreed to establish a "long-term, consistent comprehensive strategic partnership" as an institutional basis for stabilizing and improving bilateral relations. This high-level interaction also occurred at a time when US President Donald Trump adopted a more unpredictable trade and diplomatic stance toward allies and China, prompting several Western countries to reassess and strengthen their engagement with Beijing.

China and the UK announced a number of trade and economic arrangements, including China providing British citizens with a 30-day visa-free entry, lowering import tariffs on Scotch whisky, and British pharmaceutical company AstraZeneca announcing a large-scale investment in China. In addition, the two sides also exchanged views on global security, climate change and combating human trafficking, and explored cooperation opportunities. Although the trip was described by the British side as a "reset" of diplomatic relations, Starmer still raised concerns about several sensitive issues during the talks, including the legal case of Jimmy Lai and the human rights situation in Xinjiang. His stance also sparked debate in the UK, with some Conservative Party politicians questioning the potential security risks of the trip and criticizing the government's China policy.

== Background ==
=== China–United Kingdom relations ===
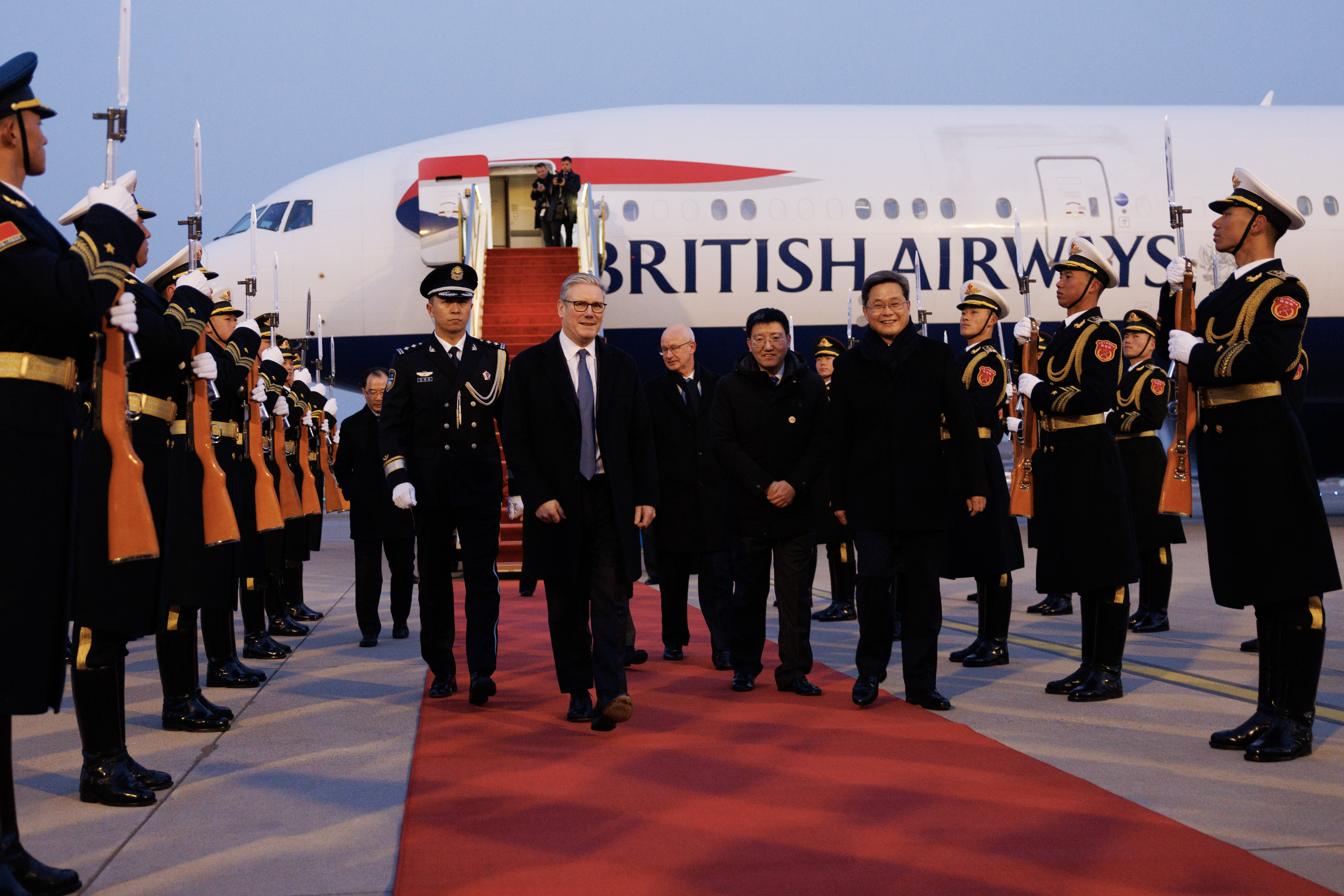
Starmer arrives in Beijing, marking the start of his visit to China

China–United Kingdom relations reached their peak in 2015 during the administration of Prime Minister David Cameron, a period known as the "Golden Era", when the two sides announced the establishment of a global strategic partnership for the 21st century. However, in the years that followed, as Beijing strengthened its control over Hong Kong affairs, the British government banned Chinese investment in sensitive telecommunications infrastructure, and British suspicions of Chinese espionage and economic interference in the UK rose, bilateral relations deteriorated rapidly. Keir Starmer once described this period as an "ice age".

In November 2025, MI5 issued a warning that Chinese intelligence agencies were contacting and attempting to recruit British members of parliament through the social media platform LinkedIn. In December 2025, Jimmy Lai, a British citizen and founder of Next Digital, was convicted in a case involving the Hong Kong national security law, which further exacerbated tensions between the two sides and became one of the issues of great concern in British public opinion on the eve of Keir Starmer's visit to China.

=== Labour government's China policy ===
After the Labour Party led by Keir Starmer came to power, it conducted a comprehensive review of its China policy and proposed a framework for China based on the "3Cs framework", namely "Cooperate, Competition and Challenge". According to this concept, the UK will cooperate with China in areas of common interest such as climate change and global public health, maintain competition in terms of economic influence, and take a clear stance on human rights and national security issues, and pursue a policy orientation of risk reduction rather than decoupling.

At the domestic level, given the sluggish economic growth and declining investment levels in the UK since Brexit in 2016, the government of Keir Starmer regards improving economic relations with major trading partners, especially trade with China, as one of the important means to stimulate economic growth.

=== China's "super embassy" ===
On the eve of the visit, the British government approved China's plan to build a "super embassy" on the site of the Royal Mint Court in London. Because the site was close to the key communications cables in the City of London, it raised concerns about potential eavesdropping risks and was strongly criticized by the opposition and some media. The Daily Mail even criticized the government of Starmer with the title "Kow-tow Keir".

=== International geopolitical environment ===
Starmer's trip was also placed in a broader international context. With Donald Trump's re-election as US president, his tariff threats and remarks on Greenland's sovereignty have impacted the relationship between the US and its traditional allies. At the same time, China's rapid development in life sciences, artificial intelligence and environmental protection technologies has led the UK to assess that the risks of completely avoiding contact with China may outweigh the costs of limited contact.

Under these circumstances, leaders of many countries have successively launched diplomatic missions to visit China, including Canadian Prime Minister Mark Carney, French President Emmanuel Macron and Finnish Prime Minister Petteri Orpo, in order to diversify economic risks and readjust their policies toward China. Starmer has also been described by some analysts as facing a "three-body problem", that is, he needs to maintain a balance in relations with the United States, the European Union and China at the same time.

On the security front, the UK seeks to cooperate with China on security matters, including combating cross-border smuggling groups and curbing the supply chain of illicit synthetic opioids. The UK also informed the US of the visit arrangements in advance, reiterating that it remains highly vigilant in key infrastructure areas such as wind power and electric vehicle technology, while trying to strike a balance between national security and diversifying economic risks.

== The visit ==
=== Beijing (28–29 January) ===
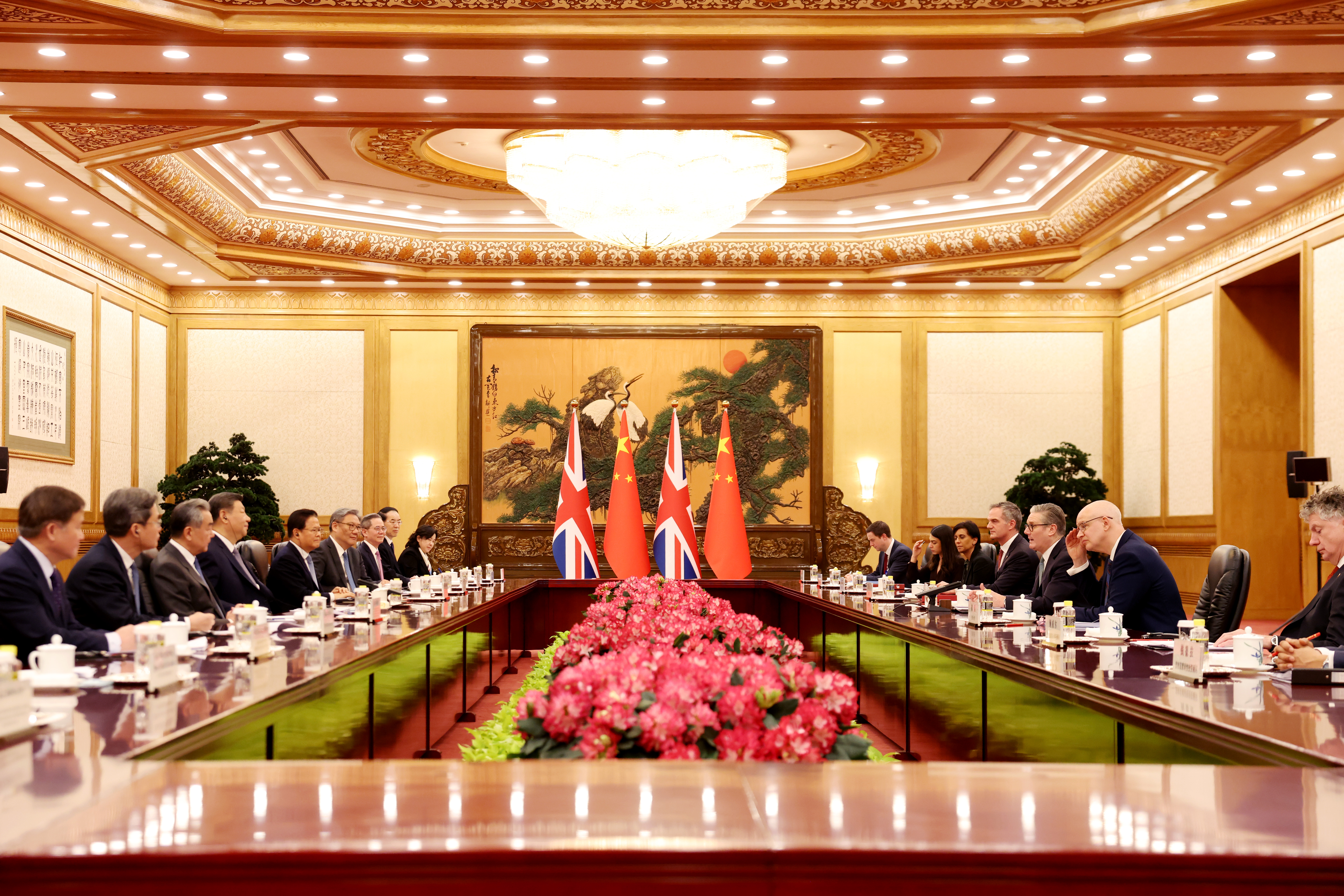
Starmer meets Chinese President Xi Jinping for a bilateral meeting at the Great Hall of the People

On the evening of 28 January 2026, British Prime Minister Keir Starmer led a delegation to Beijing for a three-day visit to China. The main objective of the trip was to promote the restoration of Sino-British trade relations and to seek to establish what the British side described as a "more mature" bilateral interaction model. The delegation consisted of about 60 members, including government officials and National Security Advisor Jonathan Powell, as well as senior managers from companies such as HSBC, Rolls-Royce, AstraZeneca and Jaguar Land Rover. However, Chancellor of the Exchequer Rachel Reeves did not accompany the delegation. To reduce potential risks, the British delegation adopted strict information security measures during the trip, such as using disposable communication devices and restricting the carrying of smart devices to prevent eavesdropping and network intrusion. On his first night in Beijing, Keir Starmer dined at a Yunnan restaurant in Sanlitun, ordering 13 dishes including porcini mushrooms.

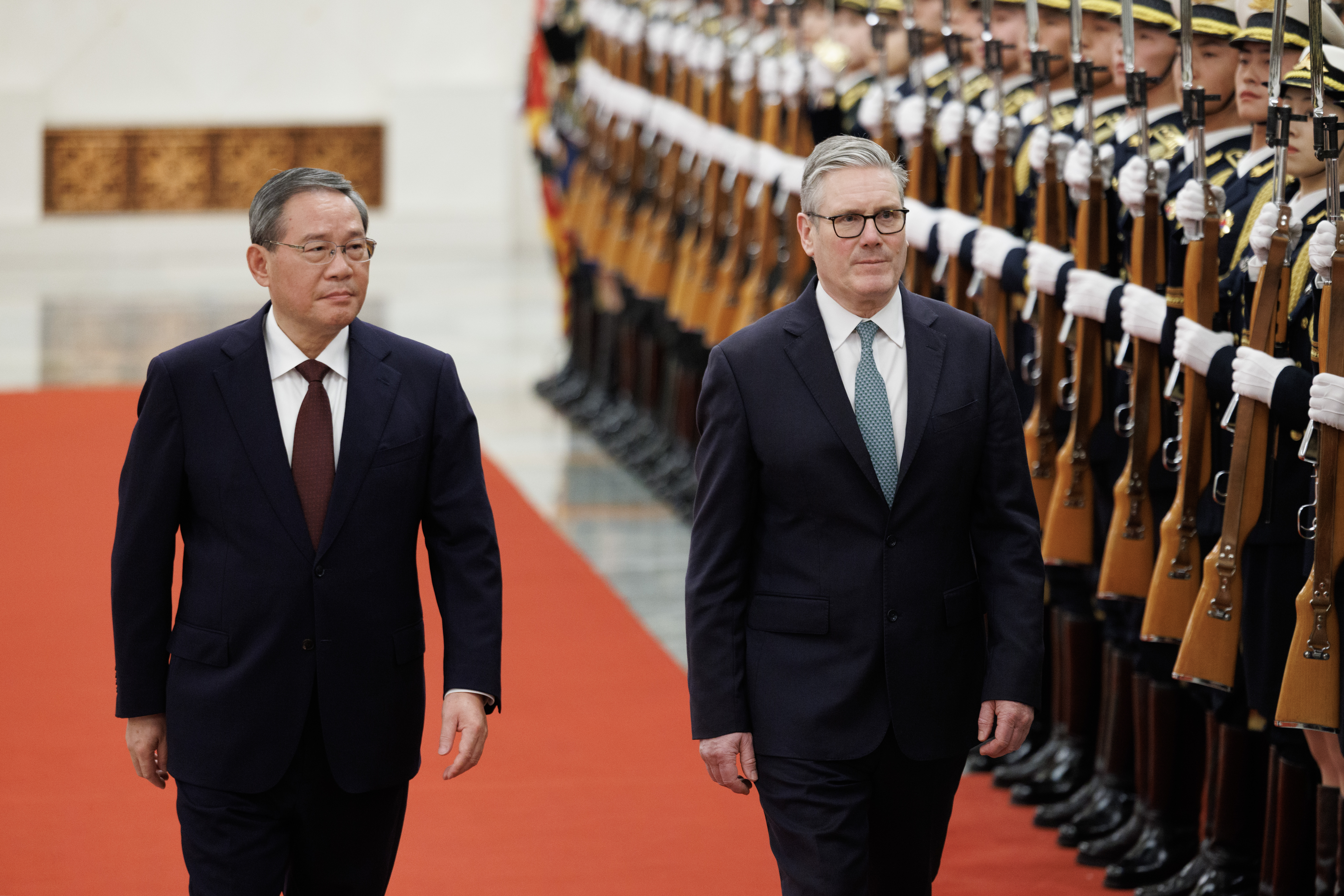
Starmer meets China's Premier Li Qiang at the Great Hall of the People

On 29 January, Starmer held a bilateral meeting with Chinese President Xi Jinping at the Great Hall of the People in Beijing. The meeting lasted about 80 minutes. In his speech, Xi said that the Sino-British relationship has experienced fluctuations in recent years, which is not in the interests of both sides. He quoted Mao Zedong's poem "Look at things from a long-term perspective" and called on the two countries to view cooperation and differences from a long-term perspective. He praised Labour governments having "made important contributions to the growth of China-UK relations". In order to show their willingness to improve relations, both sides also made adjustments in diplomatic details. For example, Xi used simultaneous interpretation in the meeting instead of the sentence-by-sentence translation method used in his previous meetings with Theresa May. This was regarded as a symbolic arrangement to improve communication efficiency. Starmer behaved solemnly and took notes during the meeting. He emphasized that that the UK hopes to establish a stable relationship with China and pointed out that changes in the international situation will directly affect the British economy and national security.

During the talks, Keir Starmer confirmed that he had raised the case of British citizen Jimmy Lai and the issue of Uyghur human rights with Xi, and described the two sides as having a respectful discussion on the relevant issues, but did not disclose the specific content of the Chinese response. In addition, Starmer, an Arsenal fan, presented Xi Jinping with a football used in a Manchester United F.C. vs. Arsenal match and signed by the player. It was reported that Xi revealed during the talks that he was a Manchester United fan. The New York Times reported in May 2026 that Starmer had asked about China's diplomatic crisis with Japan, with Xi telling Starmer that the tensions were entirely Japan's fault. After the talks, the two sides announced several areas of cooperation, including China studying the reduction of import tariffs on Scotch whisky, providing British passport holders with a visa-free period of up to 30 days, and strengthening intelligence cooperation related to combating illegal immigration smuggling tools. Subsequently, Starmer also met with Chinese Premier Li Qiang and Chairman of the Standing Committee of the National People's Congress Zhao Leji.

That afternoon, Keir Starmer visited the Forbidden City in Beijing. The tour was conducted by a guide, and no senior Chinese officials were seen accompanying him. The scenic area was not cleared of visitors.

=== Shanghai (30–31 January) ===
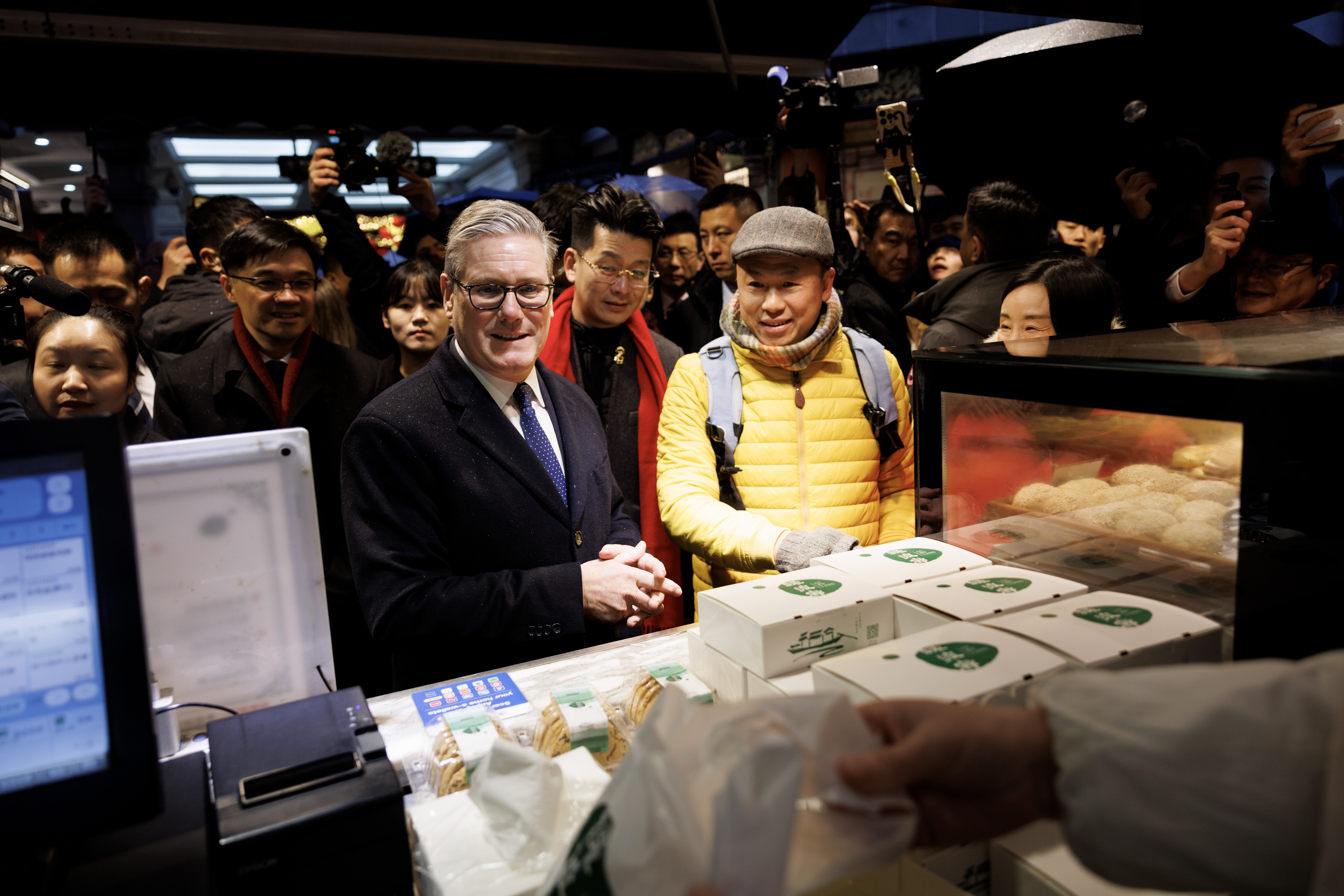
Starmer buys butterfly pastries at Shanghai's Yu Garden

On January 30, Keir Starmer traveled to Shanghai to visit Yu Garden and the Bund, and attended a business exchange symposium organized by the China-UK Business Council, where he met with business representatives from China and the UK. During the meeting, AstraZeneca CEO Pascal Soriot announced that the company plans to invest approximately CN¥100 billion (approximately £10.4 billion) in China by 2030, focusing on the construction of drug research and development and production facilities.

During his trip, Keir Starmer also met with British actress Rosamund Pike as part of promoting cultural exchange. After completing his visit to China, Keir Starmer went to Tokyo, Japan on 31 January to have a working dinner with Japanese Prime Minister Sanae Takaichi and continue his Asian diplomatic trip.

== Results ==
=== Economic cooperation and market access ===
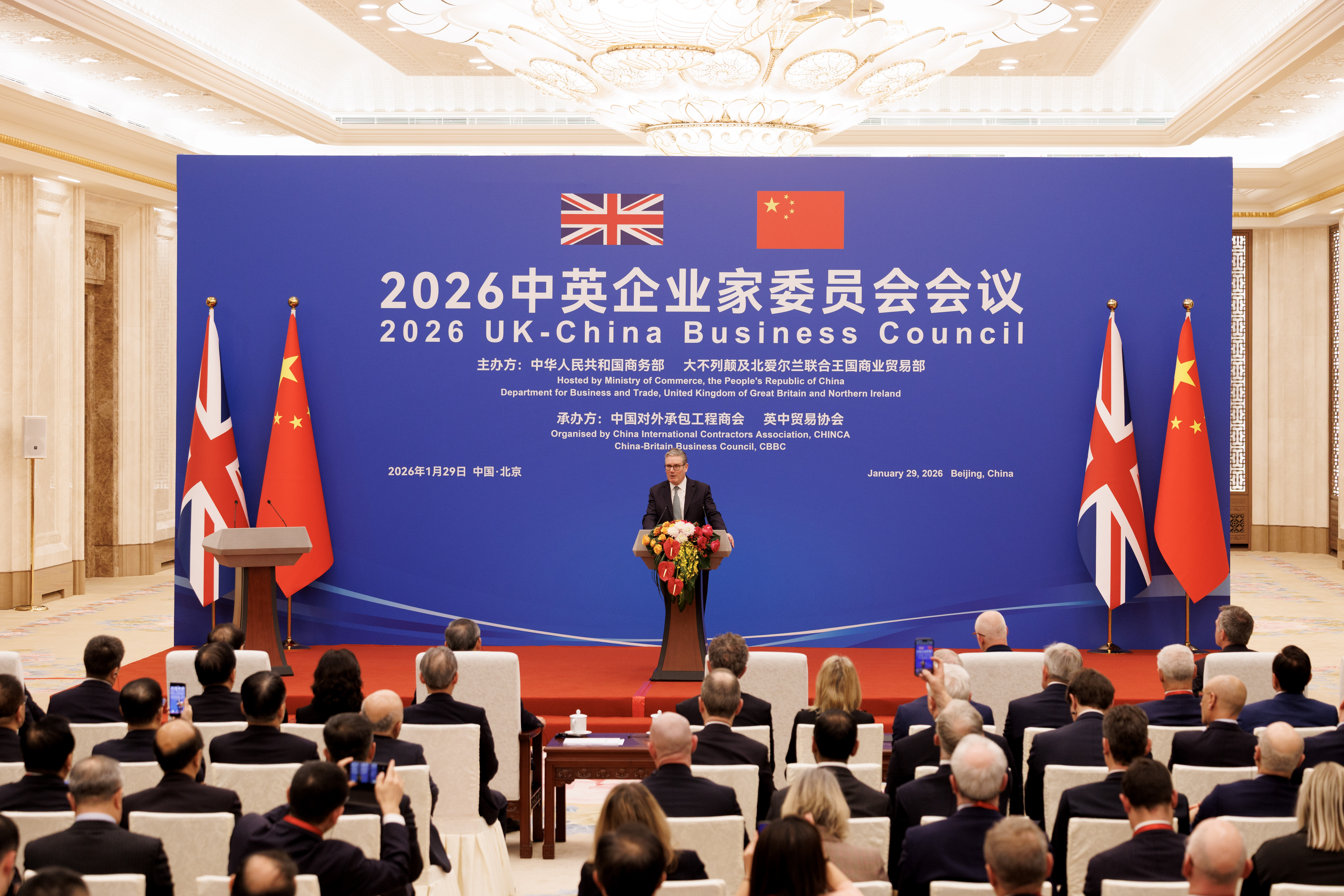
Starmer speaks at a business event at the Great Hall of the People

According to the summary published by 10 Downing Street, the UK and China reached several trade and economic agreements during the visit, including export agreements worth approximately £2.2 billion and market access arrangements worth approximately £2.3 billion over the next five years. At the industry level, China agreed to reduce the import tariff on Scotch whisky from 10% to 5%, which the UK estimated would bring an additional £250 million in revenue to the UK economy over five years.

In terms of corporate investment, British pharmaceutical company AstraZeneca announced plans to invest US$15 billion (approximately £10.9 billion) in China by 2030 to build new production facilities, expand R&D scale and increase the number of employees. The British government said the investment would help protect approximately 10,000 jobs in the UK. In the energy sector, British Octopus Energy and Chinese-funded PCG Power reached a cooperation agreement to jointly develop a digital platform for electricity trading, marking Octopus Energy's first entry into the Chinese market. At the same time, Chinese private enterprises also announced an expansion of their investment in the UK, including Pop Mart's decision to establish a European business hub in London and open seven specialty stores, and Chery's decision to establish its European headquarters in Liverpool.

In addition, both parties agreed to conduct a joint feasibility study on signing a service trade agreement, with the goal of establishing a clearer institutional framework for entering the Chinese market in service sectors where the UK has an advantage, such as finance, medical and legal services. Other signed memoranda of understanding cover multiple areas such as product standards, food safety, animal and plant quarantine, sports industry, and technical and vocational education and training.

=== Personnel exchanges and law enforcement cooperation ===
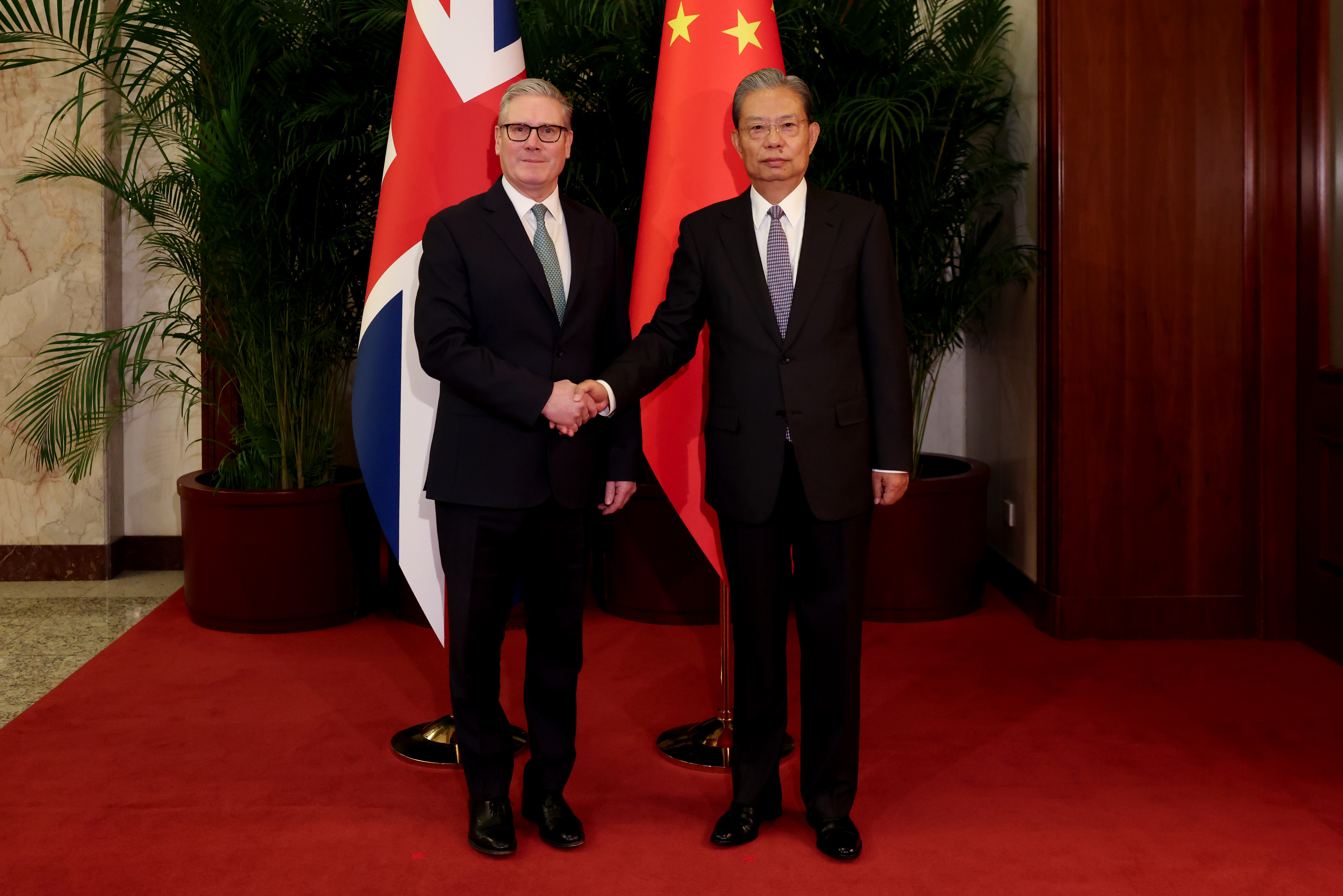
Starmer meets National People's Congress Standing Committee Chairman Zhao Leji for a bilateral meeting at the Great Hall of the People

Regarding personnel exchanges, China announced that it would grant visa-free entry to British citizens, allowing them to stay in China for no more than 30 days for tourism or business purposes. Keir Starmer said that this arrangement would help British companies expand their business in China and facilitate British citizens to travel to China. The treatment would be similar to that of more than 50 countries, including France, Germany and Australia.

At the level of security and law enforcement cooperation, the two countries signed a border cooperation agreement to strengthen the fight against transnational organized crime and illegal immigration activities. The law enforcement agencies of both sides agreed to deepen intelligence exchanges, focusing on the supply chain of small boat engines and related equipment that assist illegal immigrants in crossing the English Channel. The British side pointed out that more than 60% of the boat engines used in such illegal activities last year were Chinese brands.

=== Political dialogue and human rights issues ===
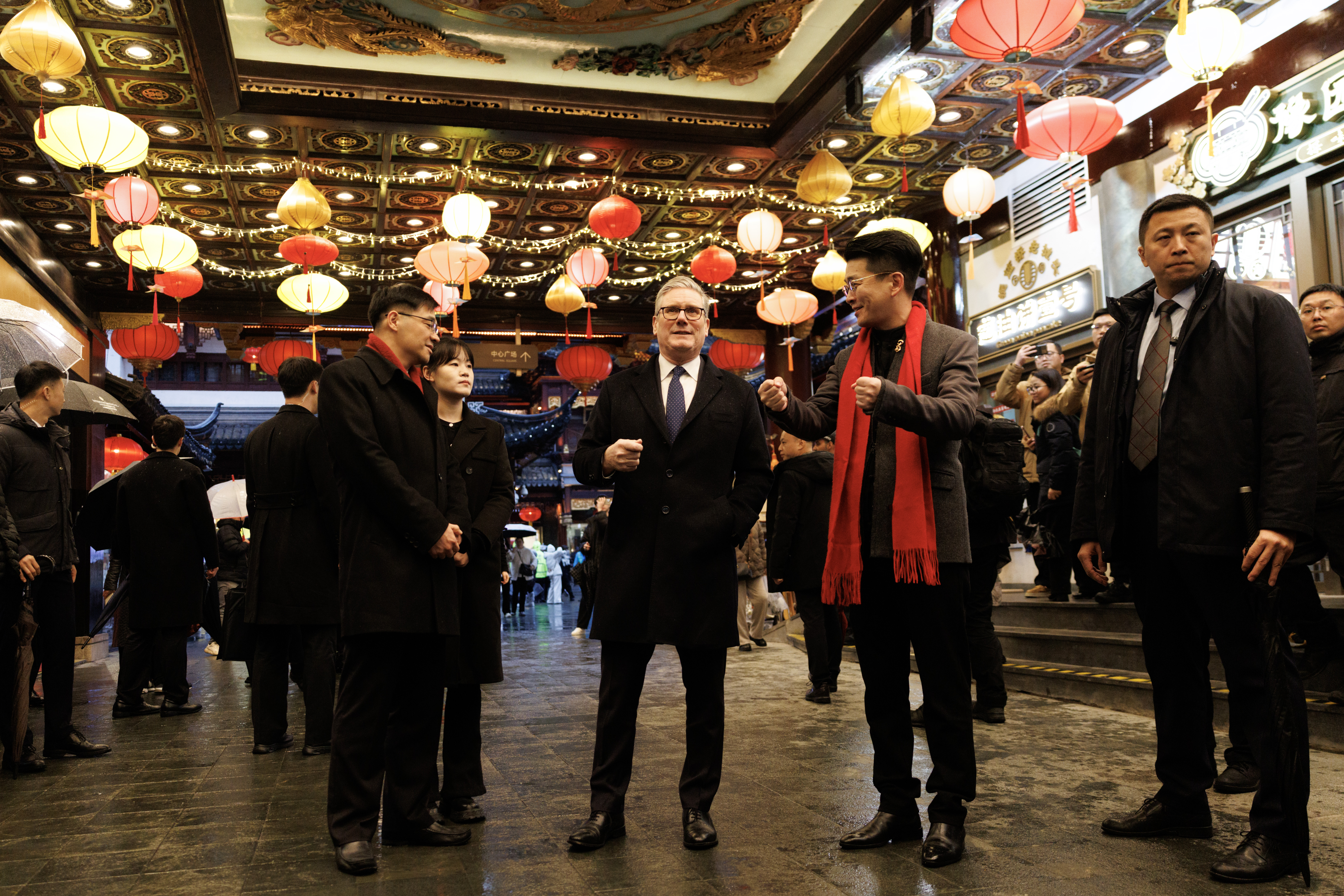
Starmer visits Yuyuan Garden in Shanghai where he joined students inside the Huxinting Tea House and helped finish handcrafted UK themed lanterns

At the political level, Keir Starmer reiterated that the UK's established policy on the Taiwan issue has not changed. On sensitive issues such as human rights, Keir Starmer said that he raised the issue of Jimmy Lai in a "respectful manner" with the Chinese side, as well as the human rights issue of the Uyghurs in Xinjiang. In addition, Keir Starmer announced that the Chinese side had lifted the sanctions imposed on six current British Members of Parliament and Members of the House of Lords since 2021. He described this as a "clear victory" and believed that it showed that maintaining contact with the Chinese side was the right thing to do.

== Reactions ==
=== China ===
At a regular press conference, Guo Jiakun, spokesperson for the Ministry of Foreign Affairs of China, described the visit as having achieved "fruitful results" and demonstrating the depth of cooperation between the two countries. In response to Donald Trump's criticism that Keir Starmer's visit to China was "very dangerous," Guo Jiakun said that Sino-British cooperation is "mutually beneficial and win-win" and that China is willing to cooperate with all countries to benefit the people and should not be interfered with by third parties.

=== United Kingdom ===
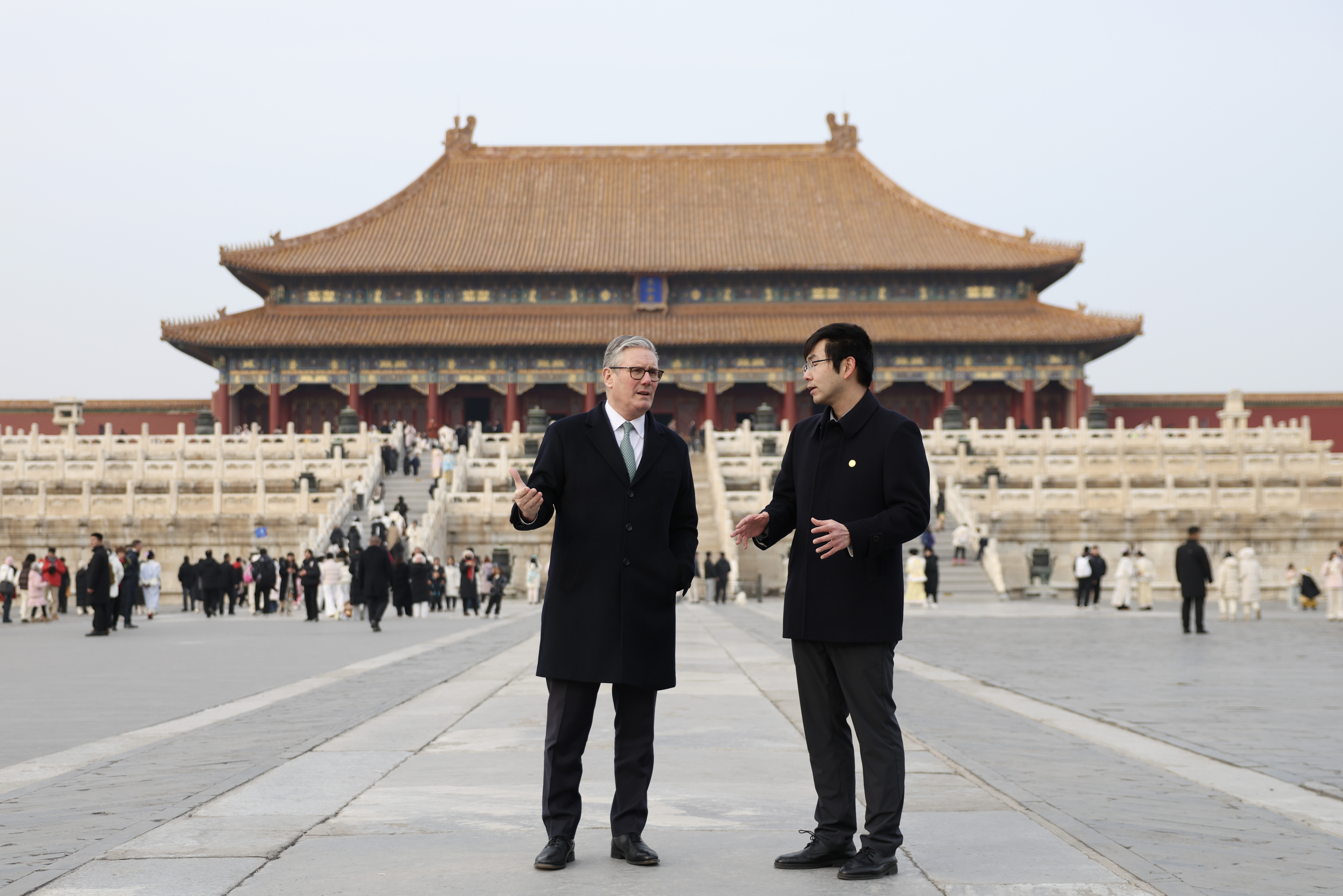
Starmer visits the Forbidden City

Downing Street declined to comment on whether it had directly demanded the release of Jimmy Lai, only reiterating that the government's position of demanding the immediate release of Jimmy Lai had not changed.

Conservative Party leader Kemi Badenoch expressed strong condemnation of the visit in an interview with Sky News, describing it as "kowtowing" to China and saying that the trip was a display of weakness rather than strength. She further pointed out that since Jimmy Lai is still imprisoned in Hong Kong, it means that Starmer's trip to China has failed. Badenoch believes that the Prime Minister's overall economic policy is too dependent on China, including key industries such as wind turbines, solar panels and electric vehicle batteries.

Shadow Minister of State for Illegal Immigration, Crime, Policing and Fire Matt Vickers also questioned the government, saying that the nation was concerned about whether the government truly understood the threat China posed to national security. He criticized the government for failing to convince the public that the Prime Minister should not go to Beijing to "kowtow" to those who had sent spies to the British Parliament. In addition, seven members of Parliament sanctioned by China, including former Conservative Party leader Iain Duncan Smith, issued a joint statement explicitly refusing to use the lifting of sanctions as a bargaining chip for diplomatic and economic concessions. The statement emphasized that they would rather accept the sanctions indefinitely than have their identities used as a tool to justify the UK's lifting of sanctions against Xinjiang officials.

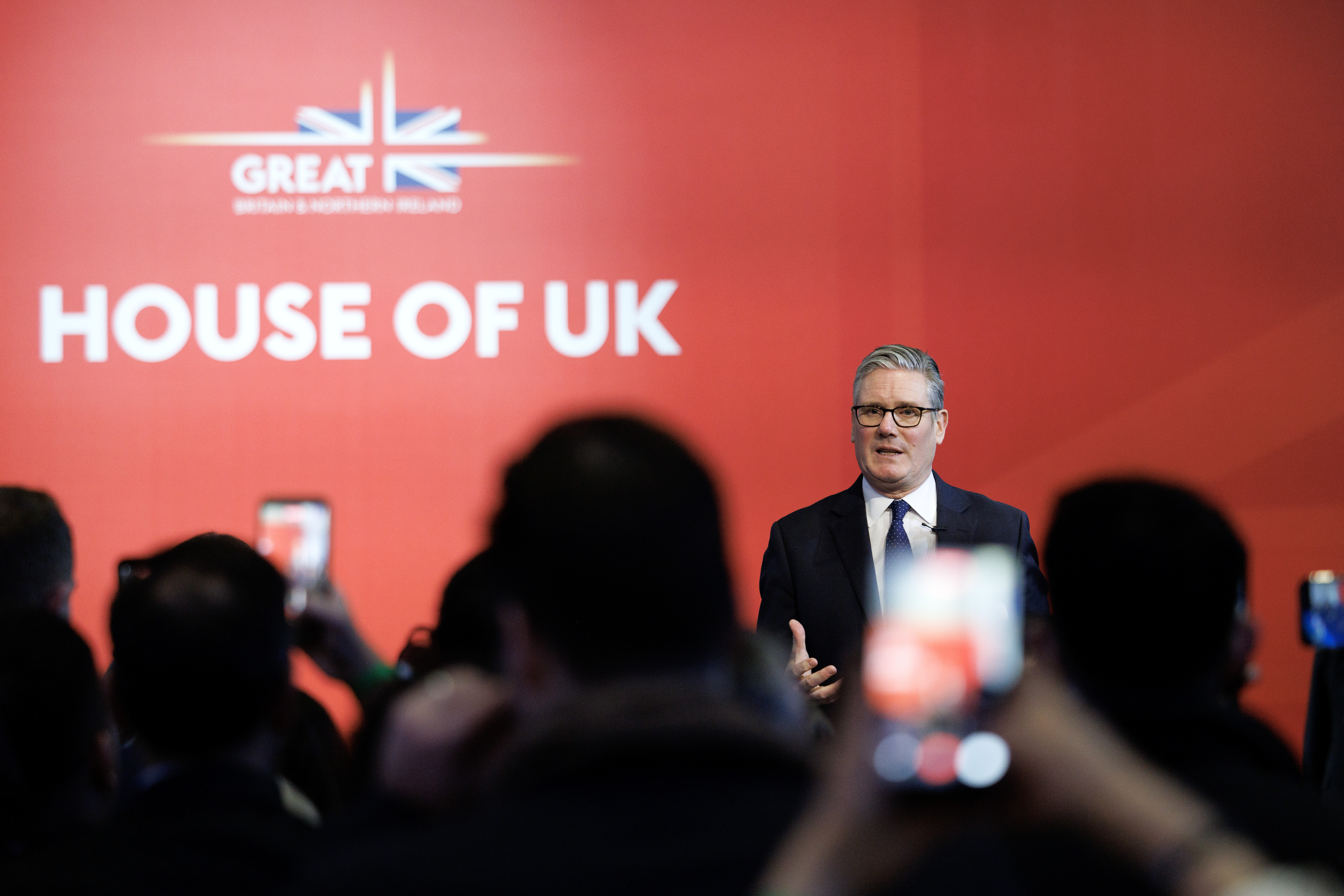
Starmer attends the House of UK reception celebrating British business at the Orbit in Shanghai

In the business world, despite the controversy, business leaders are generally open to re-engagement, and AstraZeneca CEO Pascal Soriot took the opportunity to announce a huge investment plan to expand R&D and manufacturing in China. Confederation of British Industry Director General Rain Newton-Smith pointed out that a complete decoupling from China is impossible, and the focus is on how to best promote trade.

In academia, Professor Kerry Brown of King's College London wrote that China has surpassed Britain in many technological and economic fields, and Britain needs to learn to navigate the new geopolitical reality. However, Simon Tisdall, a commentator for the transnational media, strongly opposed the trip, describing it as walking into a "bear trap" set by China, and believed that Keir Starmer's attempt to separate security from trade was too naive.

In addition, Jimmy Lai's son, Lai Chung-yan, expressed extreme disappointment with the British government's attitude in an interview with GB News. He described his 78-year-old father, who suffers from diabetes and heart disease, as "tortured" in solitary confinement for five years, and questioned whether it was appropriate for the British government to engage in a high-profile trade mission with the CCP while his father was suffering. He pointed out that Britain had paid for the planning of the "super embassy" facilities and the Prime Minister's visit, but could not get back an elderly man in very poor health, questioning "what does this relationship say?"

=== International ===
On January 29, 2026, when US President Donald Trump attended the premiere of the documentary in Washington, D.C., he was asked by reporters about his views on Keir Starmer's visit to China. He responded clearly: "This is very dangerous for them (the UK)." He emphasized that Western allies should not regard China as the answer to their economic problems. US Treasury Secretary Scott Bessant also said that the UK should not pursue the so-called "globalist agenda," which would jeopardize the ongoing free trade and economic security negotiations between the UK and the US.

== See also ==
- Foreign relations of the United Kingdom
- List of international prime ministerial trips made by Keir Starmer
