= List of international trips made by David Lammy as Foreign Secretary =

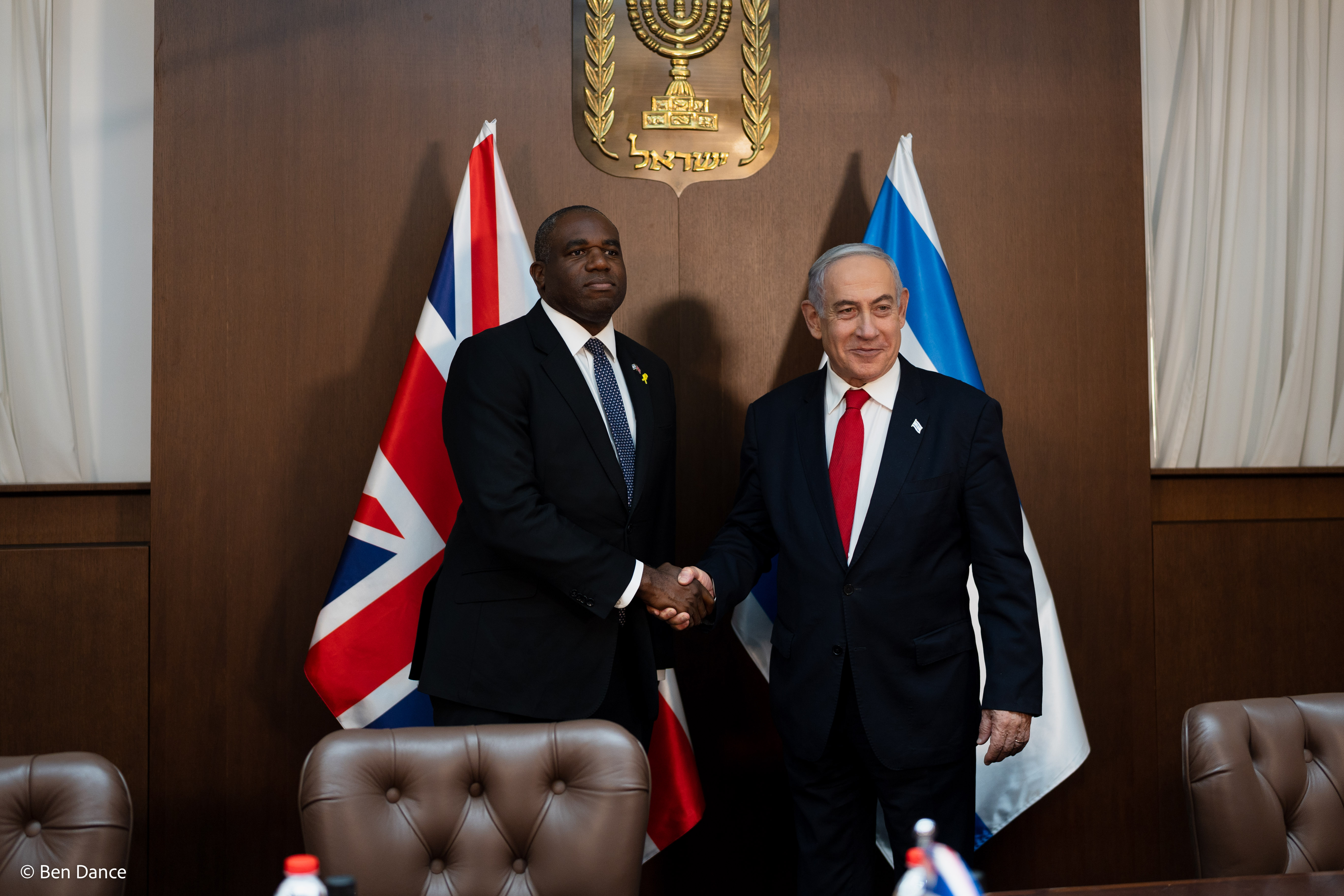
Foreign Secretary David Lammy with Israeli Prime Minister Benjamin Netanyahu in Jerusalem, Israel, 14 July 2024

This is a list of international visits undertaken by David Lammy (in office from July 2024-September 2025) while serving as the Foreign Secretary. The list includes both private travel and official visits. The list includes only foreign travel which the Foreign Secretary made during his tenure in the position.

Among his most notable trips have been the first by a British Foreign Secretary to Ireland since 2017, the first to Pakistan since 2021, the first to Syria since 2011, the first to visit Iceland since 2002 and the first to ever visit the Norwegian archipelago of Svalbard.

== Summary ==
Lammy visited 56 countries and territories during his tenure as Foreign Secretary. The number of visits per country or territory where Secretary Lammy has traveled are:

- One visit to Australia, Austria, Azerbaijan, Bahrain, Barbados, Bosnia and Herzegovina, Canada, China, Cyprus, France, Gibraltar, Guyana, Iceland, Indonesia, Ireland, Japan, Jordan, Kosovo, Kuwait, Laos, Luxembourg, Malaysia, Malta, Moldova, Morocco, the Netherlands, Nigeria, Oman, Pakistan, the Philippines, Portugal, Samoa, Saudi Arabia, Serbia, Singapore, South Korea, Spain, Sweden, Syria, Tunisia and the United Arab Emirates
- Two visits to Germany, India, Israel, Italy, Lebanon, Norway, Palestine, Qatar, South Africa, Switzerland and Turkey
- Three visits to Poland and Ukraine
- Five visits to the United States
- Seven visits to Belgium

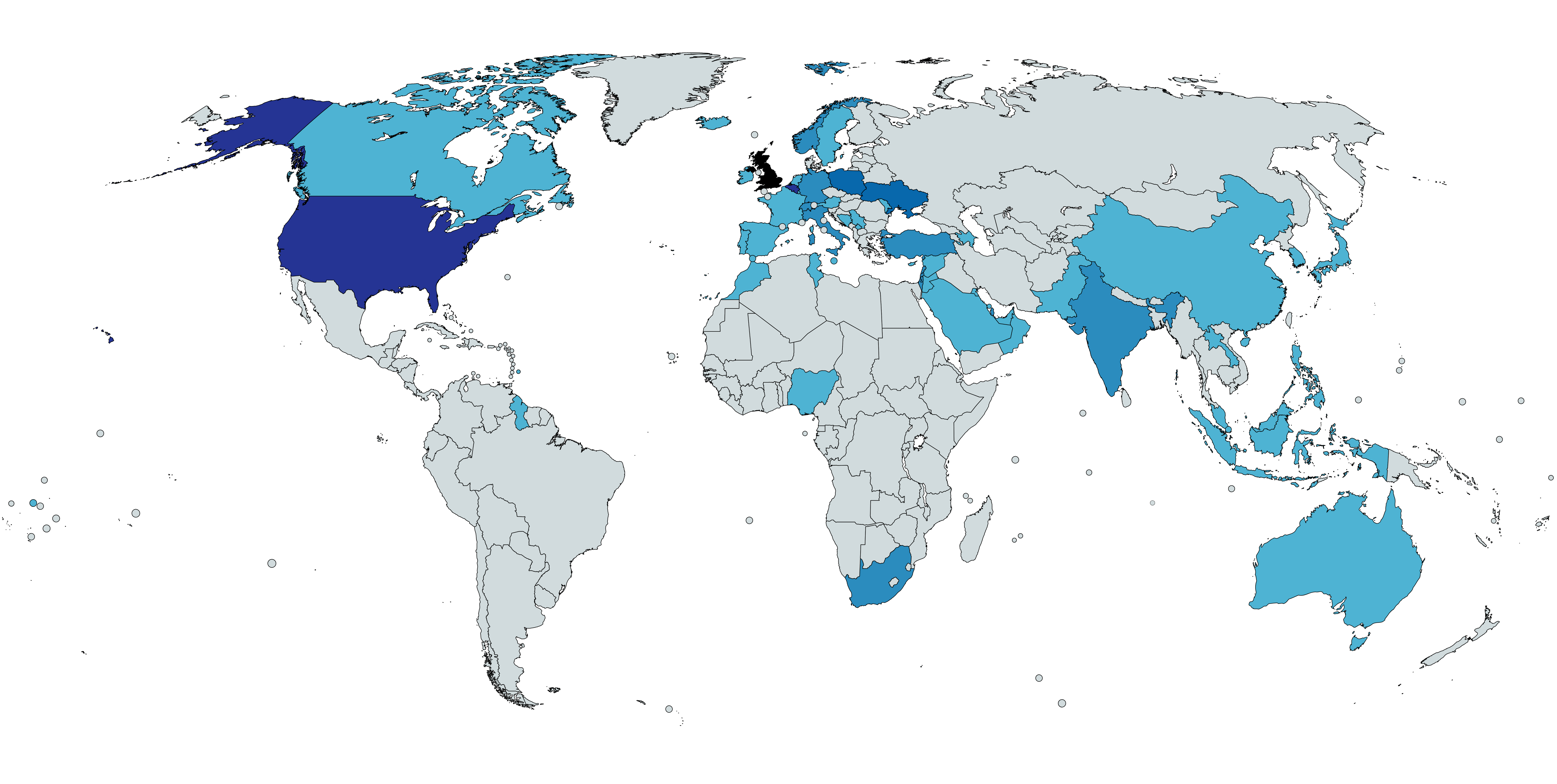
Map of international trips made by David Lammy as Foreign Secretary – July 2025: United Kingdom 5+ visits 4 visits 3 visits 2 visits 1 visit

== Table ==
	Country	Locations	Dates	Details
1	Germany	Berlin	6 July 2024	Met with German Foreign Minister Annalena Baerbock.
1	Poland	Bydgoszcz	7 July 2024	Met with Foreign Minister Radoslaw Sikorski.
1	Sweden	Stockholm	7 July 2024	Met with Foreign Minister Tobias Billström.
2	United States	Washington, D.C.	10–11 July 2024	To attend the annual NATO summit (2024 Washington summit) and met with Secretary of State Antony Blinken.
3	Israel	Jerusalem	14 July 2024	Inaugural visit to encourage de-escalations in the Middle East. Met with Prime Minister Benjamin Netanyahu.
3	Palestine	Ramallah	15 July 2024	Inaugural visit to encourage de-escalations in the Middle East. Met with Prime Minister Mahmood Abbas.
4	India	New Delhi	24–25 July 2024	Met with India's External Affairs Minister Subrahmanyam Jaishankar.
4	Laos	Vientiane	25–27 July 2024	To attend the ASEAN Foreign Ministers' Meeting. During which he held bilateral meetings with ASEAN members, as well as the Foreign Ministers of Japan and New Zealand and ASEAN Secretary General Kao Kim Hourn.
5	Qatar	Doha	31 July 2024	Joint visit with Defence Secretary John Healey to reiterate the UK's support to Qatar for the country's role in mediating and end to the war in Gaza. Met with the Emir of Qatar Tamim bin Hamad Al Thani and Prime Minister and Foreign Minister, Mohammed bin Abdulrahman Al Thani.
5	Lebanon	Beirut	1 August 2024	Joint visit with Defence Secretary John Healey to call for deescalation. Met with Prime Minister Najib Mikati, Speaker of Parliament Nabih Berri and Lebanese Armed Forces Commander General Joseph Aoun.
6	Israel	Jerusalem	16 August 2024	Joint visit with French Foreign Minister Stéphane Séjourné to Israel and the Occupied Palestinian Territories.
6	Palestine	Ramallah	16 August 2024	Joint visit with French Foreign Minister Stéphane Séjourné to Israel and the Occupied Palestinian Territories.
7	United Arab Emirates	Abu Dhabi	4–5 September 2024	Met with the UAE's Deputy Prime Minister and Minister of Foreign Affairs Abdullah bin Zayed Al Nahyan to disuses the UK-UAE relationship and how to build on existing ties.
8	Ukraine	Kyiv	11–12 September 2024	Joint visit with US Secretary of State Antony Blinken. Announced for the UK at least £242 million of funding to support Ukraine and the deployment of $484 million of fiscal support and military equipment deliveries, as well as meeting with President Volodymyr Zelenskyy and Foreign Minister Andrii Sybiha.
9	United States	Washington, D.C.	12–13 September 2024	Accompanied the first official visit to the United States of Prime Minister Keir Starmer and met with US Secretary of State Antony Blinken.
10	Norway	Bodø	18 September 2024	Visited the Norwegian Joint Headquarters with Foreign Minister Espen Barth Eide to discuss UK-Norway defence ties.
10	France	Paris	19 September 2024	Met with US Secretary of State Antony Blinken, as well as the Foreign Ministers of France, Germany and Italy to discuss the ongoing war in Lebanon.
10	Belgium	Brussels	19 September 2024	Met with European Commission Executive Vice-president Maroš Šefčovič, Spanish Minister for Foreign Affairs José Manuel Albares and Chief Minister of Gibraltar Fabian Picardo to discuss ongoing UK-EU Gibraltar negotiations.
11	United States	New York City	23–26 September 2024	To attend the annual UN General Assembly High Level week and meet with other G7 Foreign Ministers.
12	Ireland	Dublin	3 October 2024	The first UK Foreign Secretary to visit Ireland since 2017. Met with Tánaiste Micheál Martin to reset the UK and EU's relationship and discuss UK-Ireland ties.
13	Bahrain	Manama	9 October 2024	Met with UK Armed Forces personnel and toured HMS Lancaster.
13	Jordan	Amman	9 October 2024	Met with Foreign Minister Ayman Safadi.
14	Luxembourg	Luxembourg City	14 October 2024	Attended the EU's Foreign Affairs Council and met with EU High Representative and Vice-president Josep Borrell.
15	China	Beijing and Shanghai	17–19 October 2024	Met with Chinese Foreign Minister Wang Yi in Beijing and British Business leaders in Shanghai.
15	Indonesia	Jakarta	20 October 2024	Attended the inauguration of President Prabowo Subianto who he met with.
15	South Korea	Seoul	21–22 October 2024	Met with Minister of Foreign Affairs of the Republic of Korea Cho Tae-yul.
16	Samoa	Apia	25–26 October 2024	Accompanied Charles III and PM Keir Starmer to attend the 2024 Commonwealth Heads of Government Meeting. He also held bilateral meetings with Prime Minister Fiamē Naomi Mataʻafa of Samoa, Minister for Foreign Affairs Penny Wong of Australia, Foreign Affairs Adviser Md. Touhid Hossain of Bangladesh, Minister of Foreign Affairs and International Cooperation Hugh Hilton Todd of Guyana, Foreign Affairs and Foreign Trade Minister Kamina Johnson Smith of Jamaica, Foreign Minister Musalia Mudavadi of Kenya, Foreign Minister Dr Abdulla Khaleel of Maldives, Deputy Prime Minister and Foreign Minister Ishaq Dar of Pakistan, and Foreign Minister Olivier Nduhungirehe of Rwanda.
17	Nigeria	Lagos	3 November 2024	Met with Nigerian President Bola Ahmed Tinubu, Foreign Minister Yusuf Tuggar and Lagos Governor Babajide Sanwo-Olu.
17	South Africa	Cape Town	4–5 November 2024	Attended the biennial UK-South Africa bilateral forum and met with Foreign Minister Ronald Lamola.
18	Azerbaijan	Baku	11–12 November 2024	Attended COP29.
19	Belgium	Brussels	13 November 2024	Attended meetings with EU High Representative Josep Borrell, US Secretary of State Antony Blinken and Ukrainian Foreign Minister Andrii Sybiha.
20	United States	New York City	17–18 November 2024	Chair a meeting of the United Nations Security Council.
21	Moldova	Chișinău	20 November 2024	Visited Moldova to sign the UK-Moldova Defence and Security Partnership and an agreement on readmissions with President Maia Sandu. He was also joined by Romanian Foreign Minister Luminița Odobescu.
22	Italy	Rome	25 November 2024	Attended G7 Foreign Ministers meeting to discuss Lebanese ceasefire.
23	Belgium	Brussels	4 December 2024	Attended the NATO Foreign Ministers Meeting in Brussels.
23	Malta	Valetta	5 December 2024	Attended the 31st OSCE Foreign ministers meeting
24	Barbados	Bridgetown	12 December 2024	Met with Prime Minister Mia Mottley and visited people impacted by the devastation of Hurricane Beryl accompanied by UK minister for the Caribbean, Nicky Chapman, Baroness Chapman.
24	Guyana	Georgetown	13 December 2024	Met with President Irfaan Ali and discussed commercial ties and support for Guyana against Venezuela.
25	Belgium	Brussels	18 December 2024	Attended a NATO Foreign Ministers meeting.
26	Saudi Arabia	Riyadh	12 January 2025	Met with international partners to discuss the future of Syria, including with Saudi Foreign Minister Prince Faisal bin Farhan Al Saud.
27	Tunisia	Tunis	31 January 2025	Travelled to Tunisia to unveil a new package of up to £5 million to boost UK funded programmes in the region to upskill migrants in-country and reduce migration.
28	Ukraine	Kyiv	5 February 2025	Travelled to Ukraine to announce UK support totalling £55m to boost resilience and growth in the UK and Ukraine. Met with President Volodymyr Zelenskyy, Prime Minister Denys Shmyhal and Foreign Minister Andrii Sybiha
29	Germany	Munich	14–15 February 2025	Attended the Munich Security Conference, and met with other G7 Foreign Ministers.
30	South Africa	Johannesburg	20 February 2025	Attended the G20 Foreign Ministers meeting, and met with other G20 Foreign Ministers.
31	Austria	Vienna	24 February 2025	Attended a reinforced meeting of the OSCE Permanent Council on the third anniversary of Russia's full-scale invasion.
32	Japan	Tokyo	6–7 March 2025	Visited Japan with Jonathan Reynolds, Secretary of State for Business and Trade, for a '2+2' with their Japanese counterparts Takeshi Iwaya and Yoji Muto respectively, where they signed a new economic partnership worth £27 billion annually.
32	Philippines	Manila	7–8 March 2025	Official visit. Met with Foreign Secretary Enrique Manalo and President Bongbong Marcos to discuss the advancement of Philippines–United Kingdom relations.
33	Canada	Charlevoix	13–14 March 2025	Attended the G7 Foreign Ministers Summit, attending eight sessions, focusing on Ukraine, the Indo-Pacific, the Americas, the Middle East, Africa, and maritime security.
34	Portugal	Lisbon and Oeiras	30 March 2025	Met with the Portuguese Foreign Minister Paulo Rangel and visited Naval Striking and Support Forces NATO.
34	Spain	Madrid	31 March 2025	Attended the Weimar+ Foreign ministers meeting.
35	Serbia	Belgrade	2 April 2025	Traveled to Serbia ahead of the UK-hosted Autumn Berlin Process Summit to discuss cooperation on security and illegal migration. Also signed an agreement on cyber cooperation.
35	Kosovo	Pristina	2 April 2025	Visited UK troops at KFOR.
35	Belgium	Brussels	2 April 2025	Attended the NATO Foreign Minister's meeting.
36	Italy	Rome	9–10 April 2025	Visited Italy at the same time as King Charles III. Co-chaired the Clean Power for Growth roundtable with Italian Foreign Minister Antonio Tajani.
37	Oman	Muscat	26–27 April 2025	Visited to celebrate 225 years of government-to-government relations, discuss growth and cooperation on regional security challenges.
37	Qatar	Doha	28 April 2025	Chaired the UK-Qatar Strategic Dialogue.
38	Poland	Warsaw	7 May 2025	Attended high-level Gymnich EU talks in Poland, ahead of the UK-EU Summit of 19 May.
38	Bosnia Herzegovina	Butmir	7 May 2025	Visited the Camp Butmir, the base of Operation Althea and met with Elmedin Konaković the Bosnian Foreign minister, to reaffirm support for a stable and united Bosnia with a path to EU membership.
39	Ukraine	Lviv	9 May 2025	Visited Lviv with 17 other Foreign Ministers to call for a Special Tribunal to investigate Ukraine war crimes and announce sanctions on the Russian Shadow Fleet.
40	Turkey	Antalya	15 May 2025	Traveled to Ankara for an informal NATO Foreign Ministers meeting on the occasion of Russia-Ukraine ceasefire talks in Antalya.
40	Pakistan	Islamabad	16 May 2025	First UK Foreign Secretary to visit Pakistan since 2021. Visited to support the ceasefire following the 2025 India–Pakistan standoff, which he played a role in negotiating.
41	Norway	Svalbard, Ny Ålesund	27-28 May 2025	Became the first UK Foreign Secretary to travel to Svalbard. With his Norwegian counterpart discussed Arctic security, UK scientific funding and discussed UK-Norway defence ties.
41	Iceland	Reykjavík, Keflavík	29-30 May 2025	First UK Foreign Secretary to visit Iceland in over 20 years. Met with Icelandic Minister for Foreign Affairs Þorgerður Katrín Gunnarsdóttir and announced a new UK-Iceland scheme to use AI technology to monitor hostile activity in the region.
42	Morocco	Rabat, Marrakesh	1-2 June 2025	Traveled to Rabat for the annual UK-Morocco Strategic Dialogue, followed by the Ibrahim Governance Weekend.
43	India	New Delhi	7-8 June 2025	Second visit to India, to discuss ongoing economic and migration partnership and meet with Prime Minister Narendra Modi.
44	Gibraltar	Gibraltar	11 June 2025	Met with the Chief Minister of Gibraltar Fabian Picardo ahead of talks with the EU in Brussels on the UK-EU agreement on Gibraltar. The two then traveled together to Brussels.
44	Belgium	Brussels	11 June 2025	Met with European Commission Executive Vice-president Maroš Šefčovič, Spanish Minister for Foreign Affairs José Manuel Albares and Chief Minister of Gibraltar Fabian Picardo to conclude the negotiations regarding the agreement between the UK and EU with respect to Gibraltar following Brexit.
45	Switzerland	Geneva	20 June 2025	Along with the French Foreign Minister Jean-Noël Barrot, the German Foreign Minister Johann Wadephul and the EU High Representative for Foreign Affairs and Security Policy Kaja Kallas, met with the Iranian Foreign Minister Abbas Araghchi. They together called for deescalation during the Twelve-Day War.
46	Netherlands	The Hague	24 June 2025	Attended the NATO Foreign Ministers meeting ahead of the 2025 NATO Summit.
46	Belgium	Brussels	25 June 2025	Attended the Global Summit: Health and Prosperity through Immunisation in Brussels.
47	Turkey	Ankara	30-31 June 2025	Met with Turkish President Erdogan and foreign minister Hakan Fidan to discuss trade and security links.
48	Cyprus	Nicosia	4 July 2025	Met with Cypriot foreign minister Constantinos Kombos to discuss bilateral ties.
48	Lebanon	Beirut	4 July 2025	Met with President Joseph Aoun to reiterate British support for Lebanon and discuss ongoing UK support to the Lebanese armed forces.
48	Syria	Damascus	5 July 2025	UK Foreign Secretary makes first Syria visit since 2011 as diplomatic ties are restored. Met with Foreign Minister Asaad al-Shaibani and President Ahmed al-Sharaa to discuss the advancement of Syria–United Kingdom relations, to support the new government, and to ensure that it will "meet its commitments".
48	Kuwait	Kuwait City	6 July 2025	Met with Kuwaiti Crown Prince Sabah Al-Khalid Al-Sabah to discuss security and trade.
49	Malaysia	Kuala Lumpur	11 July 2025	Attended the 32nd ASEAN regional forum. Met with Malaysian Prime Minister Anwar Ibrahim and Malaysian Foreign Minister Mohamad Hasan. They together called for deescalation during the Twelve-Day War.
49	Singapore	Singapore	12 July 2025	Met with the Singaporean Minister of Foreign Affairs Dr Vivian Balakrishnan, to celebrate the 60th anniversary of the establishment of relations between the UK and Singapore.
50	Australia	Sydney, Melbourne, Darwin	24-26 July 2025	With the UK Defence Secretary John Healey, traveled to Australia for the annual “Australia-UK Ministerial”, known as AUKMIN with counterparts Penny Wong and Richard Marles retrospectively. While they signed a new 50 year UK-Australia defence treaty, deepening the 2021 AUKUS partnership. They also traveled to Darwin to visit the UK Carrier Strike Group while on deployment (Operation Highmast).
51	United States	New York City	29 July 2025	David Lammy spoke at the UN Two-State Solution conference in New York. While there he announced the UK intention to recognise the Palestinian State in September at the UN General Assembly, unless Israel declares a ceasefire in Gaza.
52	Switzerland	Locarno	11 August 2025	David Lammy spoke at the Locarno film festival on the spirit of the Locarno Treaties.

== See also ==
- List of international prime ministerial trips made by Keir Starmer
- List of international trips made by foreign secretaries of the United Kingdom
- List of international trips made by David Cameron as Foreign Secretary of the United Kingdom
