= List of international prime ministerial trips made by Keir Starmer =

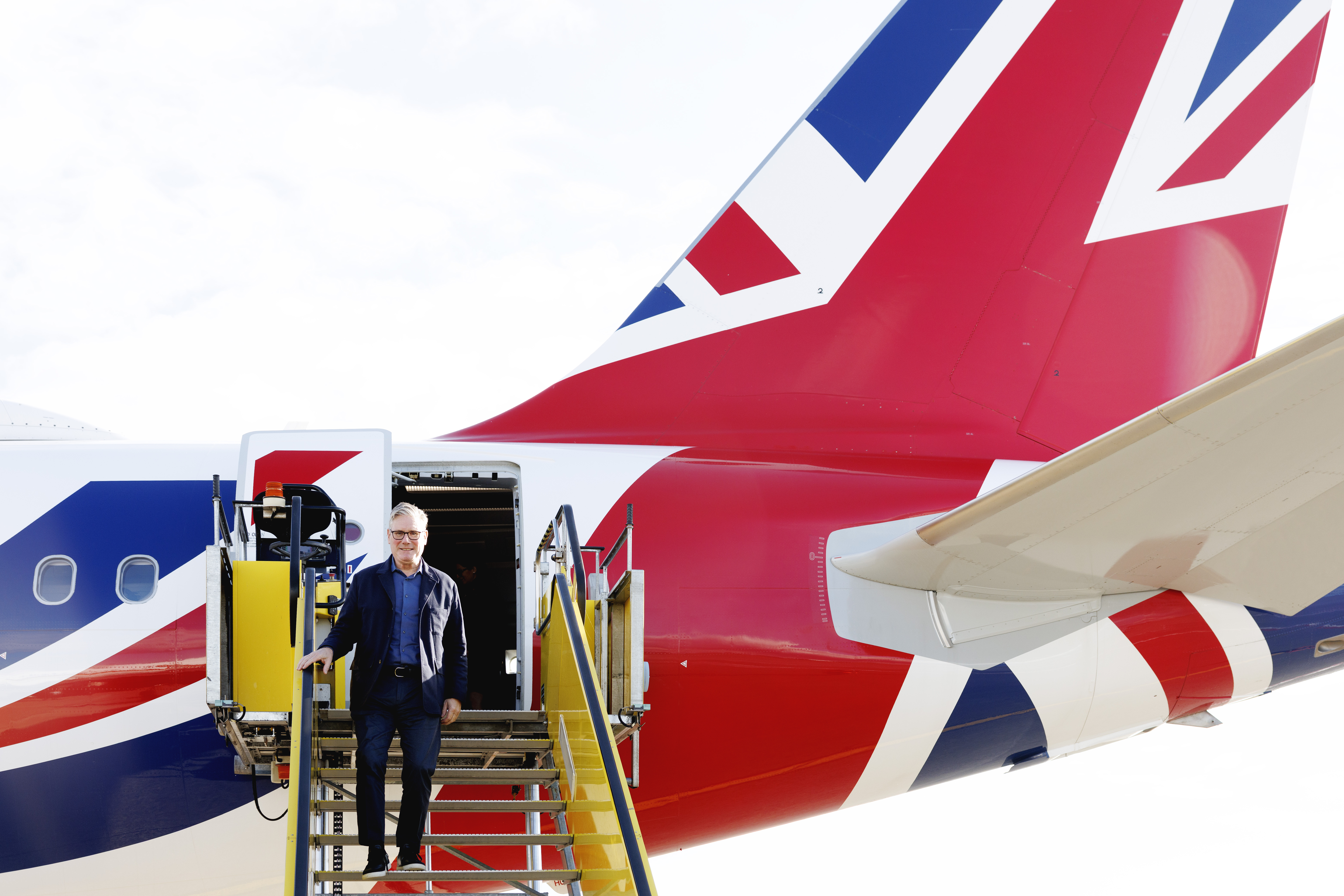
Prime Minister Keir Starmer arrives in Copenhagen, October 2025.

Keir Starmer, who served as Prime Minister of the United Kingdom from 5 July 2024 until his resignation on 20 July 2026, made 49 international trips to 33 countries and one British Overseas Territory during his premiership.

== Summary ==
The number of visits per country/territory where Starmer travelled are:

- One: Akrotiri and Dhekelia, Albania, Armenia, Azerbaijan, Bahrain, Canada, China, Cyprus, Denmark, Egypt, Estonia, Finland, Hungary, India, Japan, the Netherlands, Poland, Qatar, Samoa, South Africa, Switzerland, and the Vatican City
- Two: Belgium, Brazil, Ireland, Italy, Norway, Saudi Arabia, Turkey, and the United Arab Emirates
- Three: Ukraine
- Five: United States
- Seven: Germany
- Nine: France

World map highlighting the 33 countries visited by Keir Starmer during his premiership: United Kingdom One visit Two visits Three visits Five visits Seven or more visits

== 2024 ==
#	Country/Territory	Location	Date	Details	Image
1	United States	Washington, D.C.	9–11 July	Starmer attended the 2024 NATO summit for his first international trip. On the flight to the summit, Starmer laid out a "cast iron" commitment to increase defence spending to 2.5% of GDP, following a “root and branch” review of Britain's defences. At the summit, Starmer signaled that Ukraine could use Britain's Storm Shadow missile donations to strike military targets inside Russia, during the Russian invasion of Ukraine. In a meeting with Ukrainian president Volodymyr Zelenskyy, Starmer called for an “irreversible” membership strategy for Ukraine to join NATO. Starmer presented US president Joe Biden with an Arsenal shirt during their introductory meeting, while emphasising the importance of the US-UK Special Relationship. Additionally, Starmer held a bilateral meeting with German Chancellor Olaf Scholz, and watched England win the UEFA Euro 2024 semi-finals with Dutch prime minister Dick Schoof. Starmer spoke with French president Emmanuel Macron, Estonian prime minister Kaja Kallas, and NATO Secretary General Jens Stoltenberg in “brush by” encounters.	
2	Germany	Berlin	14 July	Starmer attended the UEFA Euro 2024 final, with Prince William, Prince George, and Culture Secretary Lisa Nandy, watching England lose to Spain.	
3	France	Paris	26–27 July	Starmer attended the 2024 Summer Olympics opening ceremony, and was greeted by President Macron upon arrival. Starmer was originally planned to travel by Eurostar; however, flew instead due to delays and cancellations caused by arson attacks across French railways. On the following day, Starmer met with athletes from Team GB, and backed them to get a top-three finish in the medal table.	
4	Germany	Berlin	27–28 August	Starmer met with Chancellor Olaf Scholz at the chancellery to discuss bilateral and foreign policy topics as well as European and economic policy issues. On the first day of his trip, Starmer visited the Brandenburg Gate; he met with President Frank-Walter Steinmeier the following morning. Starmer and Scholz discussed negotiations on a defence pact, based on the Lancaster House Treaties between France and the UK, in addition to a wider cooperation agreement that would boost political and economic ties, previously damaged by Brexit. Starmer also met chief executive of Rheinmetall Armin Papperger, whose company is working to modernise the British Army. Starmer stated that the two countries plan to draw up a “joint action plan to tackle illegal migration;” Starmer emphasised that the trip was beginning of a 'reset' of UK relations with Europe, and the European Union.	
4	France	Paris	28–29 August	Starmer attended the 2024 Summer Paralympics opening ceremony. The following day, Starmer had breakfast with major French business investors, including from Thales, Eutelsat, Mistral AI and Sanofi. After meeting Starmer later met with President Emmanuel Macron at Élysée Palace, where they agreed to deepen bilateral relations, particularly in defence, security, and energy. Starmer welcomed joint action on tackling illegal migrants crossing the English Channel to the UK by small boats from France.	
5	Ireland	Dublin	7 September	Starmer met with Taoiseach Simon Harris for a working lunch at Farmleigh House where they agreed reinstate annual Anglo–Irish summits, aftwerwards the two leaders attend a UEFA Nations League match between Ireland and England at Aviva Stadium.	
6	United States	Washington, D.C.	13 September	Starmer met President Biden at the White House to discuss the wars in Gaza and Ukraine. Starmer used the meeting to encourage Biden to allow Ukraine to use Western-supplied missiles to strike military targets deep inside Russian territory, however the final decision was delayed until the United Nations General Assembly meeting.	
7	Italy	Rome	16 September	Starmer met with Italian prime minister Giorgia Meloni, seeking her support for a proposal to let Ukraine use non-US long-range weapons against Russia. Starmer promised "a new era" in cross-border cooperation to tackle people smuggling gangs.	
8	United States	New York City	24–27 September	Starmer attended the 79th United Nations General Assembly. Starmer addressed the United Nations Security Council to accuse Russia of violating the UN Charter citing the casualties of the Russo-Ukrainian war; he also called for diplomacy and an immediate ceasefire of the conflict between Israel and Hezbollah, which escalated following the 2024 Lebanon pager explosions. Starmer, with Foreign Secretary David Lammy, met with Donald Trump for the first time at Trump Tower to "establish a relationship" between the two.	
9	Belgium	Brussels	2 October	Starmer met with President of the European Commission Ursula von der Leyen to discuss ‘resetting’ UK–EU relations. The two agreed to hold regular leaders’ summits starting from 2025.	
10	Germany	Berlin	18 October	Starmer met with the 'European Quad' leaders, President Biden, Chancellor Scholz, and President Macron, to discuss the war in Ukraine and the ongoing Middle East Crisis, in wake of Israel's killing of the Hamas leader Yahya Sinwar.	
11	Samoa	Apia	24–26 October	Starmer attended the 2024 Commonwealth Heads of Government Meeting; it also marked the first time a UK prime minister had visited Samoa. Starmer met with New Zealand prime minister Christopher Luxon; the two leaders discussed the Commonwealth and bilateral relations, and Starmer thanked Luxon for New Zealand's support for Operation Interflex. The following morning, Starmer met Samoan prime minister Afioga Fiamē Naomi Mataʻafa. During a meeting with Australian prime minister Anthony Albanese, Australia and the UK announced a Climate and Energy Partnership.	
12	Hungary	Budapest	7 November	Starmer attended the 5th European Political Community Summit in Budapest. Starmer announced the signing of agreements with Kosovo, North Macedonia, and Serbia to tackle people-smuggling gangs. Starmer and Zelenskyy met on the sidelines of the summit to discuss the Ukraine Victory Plan.	
13	France	Paris	11–12 November	Starmer attended a French Armistice Day ceremony, with President Macron, becoming the first British leader to do so since Winston Churchill in 1944. Starmer and Macron pledged 'unwavering' support for Ukraine in response to the re-election of Donald Trump. The following morning, Starmer had breakfast with Macron and French prime minister Michel Barnier.	
13	Azerbaijan	Baku	12 November	Starmer became the first incumbent British prime minister to visit Azerbaijan. Starmer attended the 2024 United Nations Climate Change Conference. He announced that the UK would cut greenhouse gas emissions by 81% by 2035.	
14	Brazil	Rio de Janeiro	18–19 November	Starmer attended the 2024 G20 Rio de Janeiro summit, marking the first visit by a British premier to Brazil in 12 years. Starmer met with Chinese leaders Xi Jinping, Li Qiang and Zhao Leji, the first time a UK prime minister has met the Chinese leaders since 2018, discussing a range of subjects including Jimmy Lai, Chinese sanctions on British MPs, and committing to mutual respect and openness in bilateral relations. Starmer and Indian prime minister Narendra Modi agreed to relaunch negotiations for a Free Trade Agreement in 2025, Starmer also proposed upgrading bilateral relations by seeking a new Strategic Partnership covering energy and security. Starmer and Japanese prime minister Shigeru Ishiba agreed to launch regular "economic 2-plus-2" talks between their foreign and economic ministers, designed to boost defence and economic cooperation, as well as dissuade the United States from tariffs.	
15	United Arab Emirates	Abu Dhabi	8–9 December	Starmer met with Emirati President Sheikh Mohammed bin Zayed Al Nahyan, to discuss improving bilateral relations, boost investment, and push for a Free trade Agreement with the Gulf Cooperation Council. Upon arrival, Starmer welcomed the fall of Bashar al-Assad's regime in Syria.	
15	Saudi Arabia	Riyadh	9 December	Starmer met with Saudi Crown Prince Mohammed bin Salman to boost bilateral relations, secure further investment, and push for a Free Trade Agreement. The two leaders discussed Saudi Arabia's human rights record; Starmer also invited the Saudi crown prince to the UK, stating "hoped the leaders would be able to watch a game of football in between meetings if he took up the offer".	
15	Cyprus	Nicosia	9–10 December	Starmer became the first Prime Minister to visit Cyprus since John Major's Commonwealth meeting in 1993, and the first to visit for bilateral talks since Edward Heath in 1971. Starmer turned down an invitation to visit Northern Cyprus from Northern Cypriot President Ersin Tatar. Starmer met with Cypriot President Nikos Christodoulides agreed to strengthen intelligence and security relationship, supporting Cyprus' new National Sanctions Implementation Unit to crack down on illicit Russian finance.	
15	Akrotiri and Dhekelia	Akrotiri	10 December	Starmer visited service personnel and families at RAF Akrotiri.	
16	Norway	Bergen	16 December	Starmer became the first UK prime minister to visit Norway since Theresa May in 2018. He and Prime Minister Jonas Gahr Støre outlined a new green industrial partnership between the two countries; the two visited the Northern Lights CCUS Plant CO2 transport and storage facility. The two leaders signed a Strategic Partnership between the two countries.	
16	Estonia	Tallinn	16–17 December	Starmer attended the 2024 Joint Expeditionary Force summit. Upon arrival, Starmer reiterated his intentions to increase sanction on Russia, while putting "Ukraine in the strongest possible position whether or not there are negotiations" for a peace deal; he spoke alongside Prime Minister Støre and Estonian prime minister Kristen Michal. The following day, Starmer and Prime Minister Michal held a bilateral meeting where the two discussed military cooperation, sanctions against Russia, and EU–UK relations. Following the summit, Starmer held a trilateral meeting with Finnish president Alexander Stubb and Danish prime minister Mette Frederiksen. Starmer also met with Swedish prime minister Ulf Kristersson. Starmer addressed and thanked British troops of the HMS Iron Duke.	

== 2025 ==
#	Country/Territory	Location	Date	Details	Image
17	Ukraine	Kyiv	16 January	Upon arrival, Starmer was greeted at Kyiv railway station by British Ambassador to Ukraine, Martin Harris and Ukraine's envoy to London, Valerii Zaluzhnyi. Starmer and President Zelenskyy placed wreaths in the national colours of the UK and Ukraine at the foot of the wall outside St. Michael's Golden-Domed Monastery. At Mariinskyi Palace, the two leaders signed a '100 year Partnership' between the two countries. During his visit, Kyiv was placed under air-raid alert; Mayor of Kyiv Vitali Klitschko stated that air defences were operating in response to a drone attack.	
17	Poland	Oświęcim, Warsaw	16–17 January	Starmer, with his wife Victoria, visited the Auschwitz concentration camp ahead of the 80th anniversary of the liberation of the site. Starmer met with Polish prime minister Donald Tusk where the two discussed a new bilateral defence pact; he later met with Polish president Andrzej Duda. Starmer announced that the two countries would open a new joint programme office in Bristol the next generation of air defence systems to Poland.	
18	Belgium	Brussels	3 February	Starmer travelled to NATO headquarters for a meeting with NATO secretary general Mark Rutte. In the evening at Egmont Palace, Starmer became the first Prime Minister since the UK left the EU to address the European Council; he primarily used the trip to urge European leaders to pursue a new defence and security pact between the EU and the UK.	
19	France	Paris	17 February	Starmer joined an Emergency meeting of European leaders, hosted by President Macron, to respond to President Trump's push for peace negotiations to end the Russo-Ukrainian War. During the meeting, Starmer indicated he was prepared to deploy British troops on the ground, but also stated that the US would have to provide a "backstop" to European security guarantees.	
20	United States	Washington, D.C.	27 February	Upon arrival at the British embassy, Starmer made a speech, insisting on security guarantees for Ukraine. Starmer was greeted by President Trump at the White House, marking the first meeting between the two as leaders of their respective nations. He presented to Trump an invitation letter from King Charles III for an 'unprecedented' second state visit for a US president. Trump endorsed the Starmer government's proposed deal to relinquish the British Indian Ocean Territory to Mauritius by ceding sovereignty of the Chagos Archipelago, in exchange for a 99-year lease of Diego Garcia - including the UK-US military base. Starmer and Trump agreed to work towards a trade deal. Trump avoided Starmer's primary request of committing to a US backstop in any security guarantees for Ukraine. Starmer toured the Washington offices of Palantir Technologies, he spoke to Chief Executive Officer Alex Karp and was shown some of the company's defence-related AI technology.	
21	France	Paris	27 March	Starmer attended a meeting of the "Coalition of the willing" hosted by President Macron. During a speech, Starmer accused Russian president Vladimir Putin of "playing games and playing for time" after Putin demanded the lifting of sanctions as a condition for a Black Sea ceasefire with Ukraine, instead Starmer encouraged allies to increace sanctions. Starmer also announced that the UK would host the Ukraine Defense Contact Group meeting on 11 April.	
22	Vatican City		26 April	Starmer attended the funeral of Pope Francis, along with Prince William, Victoria Starmer, and Foreign Secretary David Lammy, on behalf of the UK.	
22	Italy	Rome	26 April	Starmer and President Zelenskyy discussed "positive progress" to end the war in Ukraine on the sidelines of the funeral, in a meeting at the British Ambassador's residence in Rome. Starmer met with Prime Minister Meloni at the Palazzo Chigi.	
23	Norway	Oslo	9 May	Starmer attended the 2025 Joint Expeditionary Force Summit. Starmer announced new sanctions against up to 100 vessels in the Russian shadow fleet which have carried more than £18 billion worth of cargo since the start of 2024.	
23	Ukraine	Kyiv	9–10 May	Starmer met with French president Emmanuel Macron, German chancellor Friedrich Merz, and Polish prime minister Donald Tusk on board a train to Kyiv. The four leaders called on Russia to agree a "full and unconditional 30-day ceasefire" in a joint statement.	
24	Albania	Tirana	14–16 May	Starmer became the first British prime minister in 26 years to visit Albania. He pushed for further efforts against migrant smuggling gangs and reinforce Albania–UK cooperation in tackling illegal migration at its source. Starmer attended the 6th European Political Community Summit.	
25	Canada	Ottawa, Kananaskis	14–17 June	On route to Ottawa, Starmer stated that "Canada is an independent, sovereign country and a much-valued member of the Commonwealth” in the wake of President Trump's threats to annex Canada as the 51st state. Upon arrival, Starmer had dinner with Canadian prime minister Mark Carney at his official residence at Rideau Cottage, later the two watched a National Hockey League game between the Edmonton Oilers and the Florida Panthers. They agreed to establish an Economic and Trade Working Group and to deepen the Trade Continuity Agreement, while Carney committed Canada to ratifying the UK's accession to CPTPP. The meeting was the first between two international leaders since Israel's strikes on Iran starting the Twelve-Day War; Starmer began a diplomatic push to try to de-escalate the Middle Eastern crisis. Starmer attended the 51st G7 summit. Starmer met with President Trump where the latter signed an executive order to implement the UK–US Trade Deal reducing some tariffs between the two countries.	
26	Netherlands	The Hague	24–25 June	Starmer attended the 2025 NATO summit, where he pledged to boost overall UK defence and security spending to 5% of economic output by 2035 to meet a NATO target. Keir Starmer has announced that the UK will send 350 advanced air defence missiles to Ukraine, funded for the first time by £70m in interest from frozen Russian assets, with the missiles rapidly adapted for ground launch and delivered via UK-supplied Raven systems. Additionally, he announced the UK's decision to purchase 12 F-35A jets which are expected to carry US atomic bombs—expanding UK nuclear capability to include airborne delivery systems.	
27	Switzerland	Zurich, Basel	27–28 July	Starmer attended the UEFA Women's Euro 2025 final.	
28	United States	Washington, D.C.	18–19 August	Starmer attended a White House multilateral meeting on Ukraine, in which he held peace talks with US president Trump, Ukrainian president Zelenskyy, and other European leaders following the Trump–Putin Alaska Summit.	
29	Denmark	Copenhagen	1–2 October	Starmer met with Danish business leaders at the British ambassador's residence in Denmark. The following day, Starmer attended the 7th European Political Community Summit. Starmer left the summit early in order to chair a COBR meeting on a Manchester synagogue attack which occurred while he was abroad.	
30	India	Mumbai	8–9 October	Starmer led the UK's largest ever trade mission to India to boost trade, technology, and defence ties; the trip followed up Indian prime minister Modi's trip to Britain where the two signed a Comprehensive Economic and Trade Agreement. Starmer and Modi held a meeting in which the two discussed the Russian invasion of Ukraine, India's reliance on fossil fuels, and India's purchase of Russian oil, in addition to Starmer reiterating the UK's support for India's bid for permanent seat at the United Nations Security Council.	
31	Egypt	Sharm El Sheikh	13 October	Upon his arrival, Starmer announced that the UK would host a conference on Gaza recovery and reconstruction; ahead of the summit Starmer met with French president Macron and Palestinian president Mahmoud Abbas. Starmer attended the 2025 Gaza peace summit which included key nations agreeing to US president Trump's Gaza peace plan to end the Gaza war. Starmer claimed the event led to a “historic day” while pledging the UK to lead rebuilding efforts and announcing a £20m humanitarian package for Gaza.	
32	Turkey	Ankara	27 October	Starmer met with Turkish president Recep Tayyip Erdoğan, where the two agreed that the UK would sell 20 Eurofighter Typhoon jets to Turkey in a deal worth up to £8 billion. The agreement marked Britain's biggest fighter-jet deal for almost two decades, and Turkey's first purchase of combat aircraft from a country other than the United States.	
33	Brazil	Rio de Janeiro, Belém	5–7 November	Starmer attended the 2025 Earthshot Prize ceremony at the Museum of Tomorrow, in Rio de Janeiro, along with Prince William, Energy Secretary Ed Miliband and London Mayor Sadiq Khan. Starmer attended the COP30 pre-conference, in which he acknowledged that "the consensus is gone" on climate change despite earlier international unity following the 2015 Paris Agreement during a speech. Marking 200 years of Brazil–United Kingdom diplomatic relations, Starmer held a bilateral meeting with Brazilian president Luiz Inácio Lula da Silva, where the two discussed multilateralism and international collaboration on climate change, joint efforts on clean energy, and the Russian invasion of Ukraine.	
34	Germany	Berlin	18 November	Starmer attended a dinner with E3 leaders German chancellor Merz and French president Macron. The three leaders discussed European defence and security, primarily focusing on the UK's ongoing negotiations to join Security Action for Europe (SAFE), the European Union's financial instrument for funding increased defence spending in European countries.	
35	South Africa	Johannesburg	21–23 November	Starmer attended the 2025 G20 Johannesburg summit. Upon arrival, he held a bilateral meeting with South African president Cyril Ramaphosa, met with South African business leaders, and announced a South Africa–UK mutual recognition agreement between their two authorised economic operators. On 22 November, the official opening day of the summit, Starmer held a virtual meeting with Indonesian president Prabowo Subianto, in which the two leaders discussed plans to launch the Indonesia–United Kingdom Strategic Partnership, and announced a new bilateral Maritime Agreement. Starmer held his first meeting with Japanese prime minister Sanae Takaichi, in which he congratulated Takaichi for her appointment as prime minister. on In response to the Draft 28-point U.S. peace plan, Starmer held an emergency 25 minute E3 meeting with French president Macron and German chancellor Merz; the meeting later expanded to the leaders of Ukrainian allies Canada, Italy, Japan, Norway, and the European Union.	
36	Germany	Berlin	15 December	Starmer attended a meeting with European leaders on peace talks for the Ukraine War.	

== 2026 ==
#	Country/Territory	Location	Date	Details	Image
37	France	Paris	6 January	Starmer attended a meeting of the Coalition of the Willing to discuss peace talks for the Ukraine War with US mediators Steve Witkoff and Jared Kushner. Starmer, along with French president Macron and Ukrainian president Zelenskyy, signed a joint declaration pledging to deploy British and French troops to Ukraine in the event of a peace deal.	
38	China	Beijing, Shanghai	28–31 January	Main article: 2026 visit by Keir Starmer to China Starmer became the first British prime minister to visit China since 2018. Starmer's trip primarily focused on broadening trade ties, bringing a delegation heavy on British banking executives, including HSBC, Barclays, and Standard Chartered, and cultural emissaries representing the arts and sports, as well as manufacturers, including Airbus, AstraZeneca, Brompton Bikes, Jaguar Land Rover, and McLaren Automotive. Starmer held a bilateral meeting at the Great Hall of the People and a lunch with Chinese president Xi Jinping and other Chinese senior officials, where the two agreed to develop a “long-term and stable comprehensive strategic partnership”. Additionally Starmer hailed China's commitments to lowering Chinese whisky tariffs and securing visa-free travel for British citizens entering China, as well as privately discussing British-Hong Kong democracy campaigner Jimmy Lai. After holding official meetings with Chinese government, Starmer took a set‑piece cultural tour at the Forbidden City. Starmer visited Shanghai on the final day of the trip.	
38	Japan	Tokyo	31 January	Starmer held a bilateral meeting with Japanese prime minister Takaichi in which the two agreed to deepen defence and economic ties, focusing on collective security in the Euro-Atlantic and Indo-Pacific regions, as well as increasing cooperation in strengthening supply chains of critical minerals. At the end of the trip, Starmer invited Takaichi to visit the United Kingdom.	
39	Germany	Munich	13–14 February	Starmer attended the 62nd Munich Security Conference. Starmer held a trilateral E3 meeting with French president Macron and German chancellor Merz. Starmer made a speech at the conference to call for a new multilateral defence initiative leading to closer integration between Britain and Europe on defence; while announcing the future deployment of the UK Carrier Strike Group, led by the HMS Prince of Wales, to the Arctic.	
40	Ireland	Cork	12–13 March	Starmer attended the 2026 UK–Ireland summit. Starmer met with Taoiseach Martin where the two leaders discussed energy security, defence cooperation, and the 2026 Iran war. Starmer and Martin signed a renewed defence agreement covering the protection of subsea cables, gas connectors, and other connections under the water.	
41	Finland	Helsinki	26 March	Starmer attended the 2026 JEF Leaders’ Summit. During the trip, he met with Finnish president Alexander Stubb and Finnish prime minister Petteri Orpo, and used the visit to discuss support for Ukraine, European security, and measures against Russia's shadow fleet.	
42	Saudi Arabia	Taif, Jeddah	8–9 April	Starmer visited the Gulf to discuss a long-term resolution to the Iran war with regional allies, particularly in response to the crisis caused from the Iranian closure of the Strait of Hormuz. Starmer began the trip by meeting with British and Saudi personnel at King Fahd Air Base. Starmer held a meeting with Saudi Crown Prince Mohammed bin Salman in which the two agreed to deepen their defence industrial cooperation to boost capability and mutual security in the long term.	
42	United Arab Emirates	Abu Dhabi	9 April	Starmer visited the United Arab Emirates on the second leg of his trip to Gulf countries. Starmer held a meeting with Emirati Sheikh Mohamed Bin Zayed Al Nahyan in which the two discussed the Iran war, its ceasefire, and its implications for regional stability.	
42	Bahrain	Manama, Zallaq	9 April	Starmer met with Bahraini King Hamad bin Isa Al Khalifa and Crown Prince Salman bin Hamad Al Khalifa in Al-Sakhir Palace, where they discussed the Iran War and the ceasefire.	
42	Qatar	Doha	9–10 April	Starmer visited Qatar for the fourth leg of his Gulf trip. Starmer met with Qatar Sheikh Tamim bin Hamad Al Thani at Lusail palace, in which the two discussed the Iran war, regional stability, and bolstering the Qatar–United Kingdom Strategic Partnership.	
43	France	Paris	17 April	Starmer co-hosted the Straits of Hormuz summit, alongside French president Macron, at the Élysée Palace with representatives of some 50 countries and organisations. The two leaders announced that the United Kingdom and France would lead a defensive multinational mission to ensure freedom of navigation in the Strait of Hormuz.	
44	Armenia	Yerevan	3–4 May	Starmer became the first incumbent British prime minister to visit Armenia post-independence. Starmer attended the 8th European Political Community Summit. Upon arrival, Starmer was welcomed by Armenian president Vahagn Khachaturyan at Zvartnots International Airport. Prior to the summit, Starmer held a bilateral meeting with Ukrainian president Zelenskyy, during which Zelenskyy thanked King Charles III for his support of Ukraine during his state visit to the United States. During the summit, Starmer and Armenian prime minister Nikol Pashinyan signed the Armenia–United Kingdom Strategic Partnership agreement.	
45	France	Évian-les-Bains	15–17 June	Starmer attended the 52nd G7 summit. Starmer resigned as Prime Minister less than a week after the trip.	
46	Germany	Berlin	24 June	Starmer attended an E5 meeting with Chancellor Friedrich Merz, French president Emmanuel Macron, Italian prime minister Giorgia Meloni, and Polish prime minister Donald Tusk, focused on preparation for the upcoming NATO summit.	
47	Turkey	Ankara	7–8 July	Starmer attended the 2026 Ankara NATO summit.	
48	France	Paris	13–14 July	Starmer co-chaired a meeting of the coalition of the willing with President Emmanuel Macron. Starmer attended Bastille Day celebrations, during which he was presented the Legion of Honour award by Macron; Starmer became the first UK prime minister to receive the award.	
49	Ukraine	Kyiv	16 July	Starmer met with President Volodymyr Zelenskyy on his final international trip as prime minister. Zelenskyy presented Starmer with the Order of Freedom.	

== Multilateral meetings ==
Starmer attended the following regular summits during his premiership:

Group	Year		
Group	2024	2025	2026
CHOGM	25–26 October, (Samoa) Apia	none	
COP	12 November, (Azerbaijan) Baku	5–7 November, (Brazil) Belém	
EPC	18 July, (United Kingdom) Woodstock	16 May, (Albania) Tirana	4 May, (Armenia) Yerevan
EPC	7 November, (Hungary) Budapest	2 October, (Denmark) Copenhagen	
G20	18–19 November, (Brazil) Rio de Janeiro	22–23 November, (South Africa) Johannesburg	
G7		16–17 June, (Canada) Kananaskis	15–17 June, (France) Évian-les-Bains
JEF	17 December, (Estonia) Tallinn	9 May, (Norway) Oslo	26 March, (Finland) Helsinki
NATO	9–11 July, (United States) Washington, D.C.	24–25 June, (Netherlands) The Hague	7–8 July, (Turkey) Ankara
UNGA	24–27 September, (United States) New York City	23–26 September^{[a]}, (United States) New York City	
██ = Did not attend.^a Deputy Prime Minister David Lammy attended in the prime minister's place.

== See also ==
- Foreign relations of the United Kingdom
- List of international trips made by David Lammy as Foreign Secretary
- List of international trips made by Yvette Cooper as Foreign Secretary
- List of international trips made by prime ministers of the United Kingdom
- List of official overseas trips made by Charles III
