= List of international trips made by foreign secretaries of the United Kingdom =

The following is a list of international trips made by foreign secretaries of the United Kingdom since 2021, in chronological order.

== James Cleverly (2022-2023) ==
Cleverly visited 51 countries and territories during his tenure as Foreign Secretary. He was the first UK Foreign Secretary to visit either Papua New Guinea or the Solomon Islands.

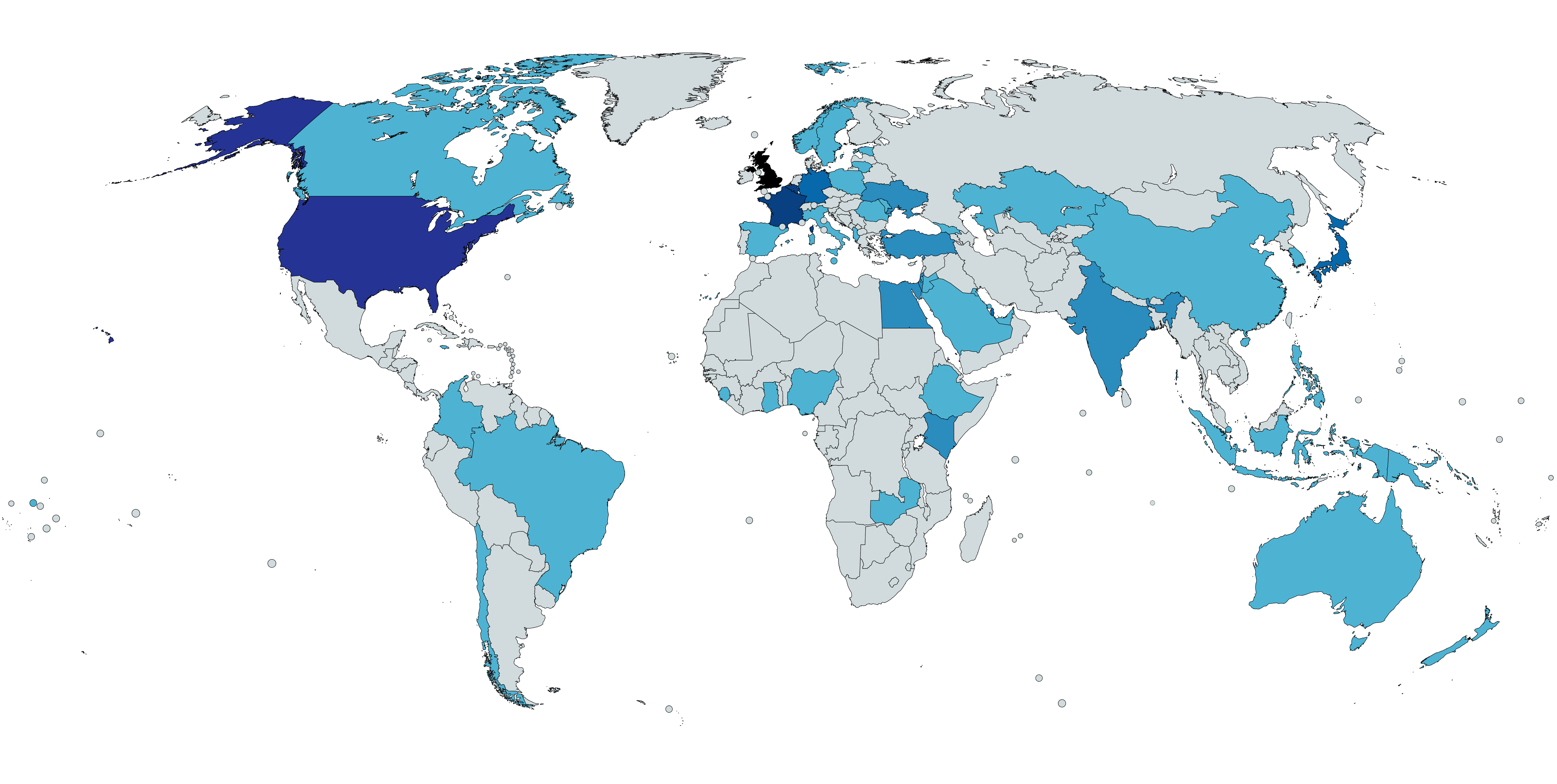
Map of international trips made by James Cleverly as Foreign Secretary: United Kingdom 5+ visits 4 visits 3 visits 2 visits 1 visit

== David Cameron (2023-2024) ==
Cameron visited 34 countries and territories during his tenure as Foreign Secretary. He was the first Minister to visit the Falkland Islands since 2016, and the first ever to visit Paraguay, Kyrgyzstan, Turkmenistan and Tajikistan.

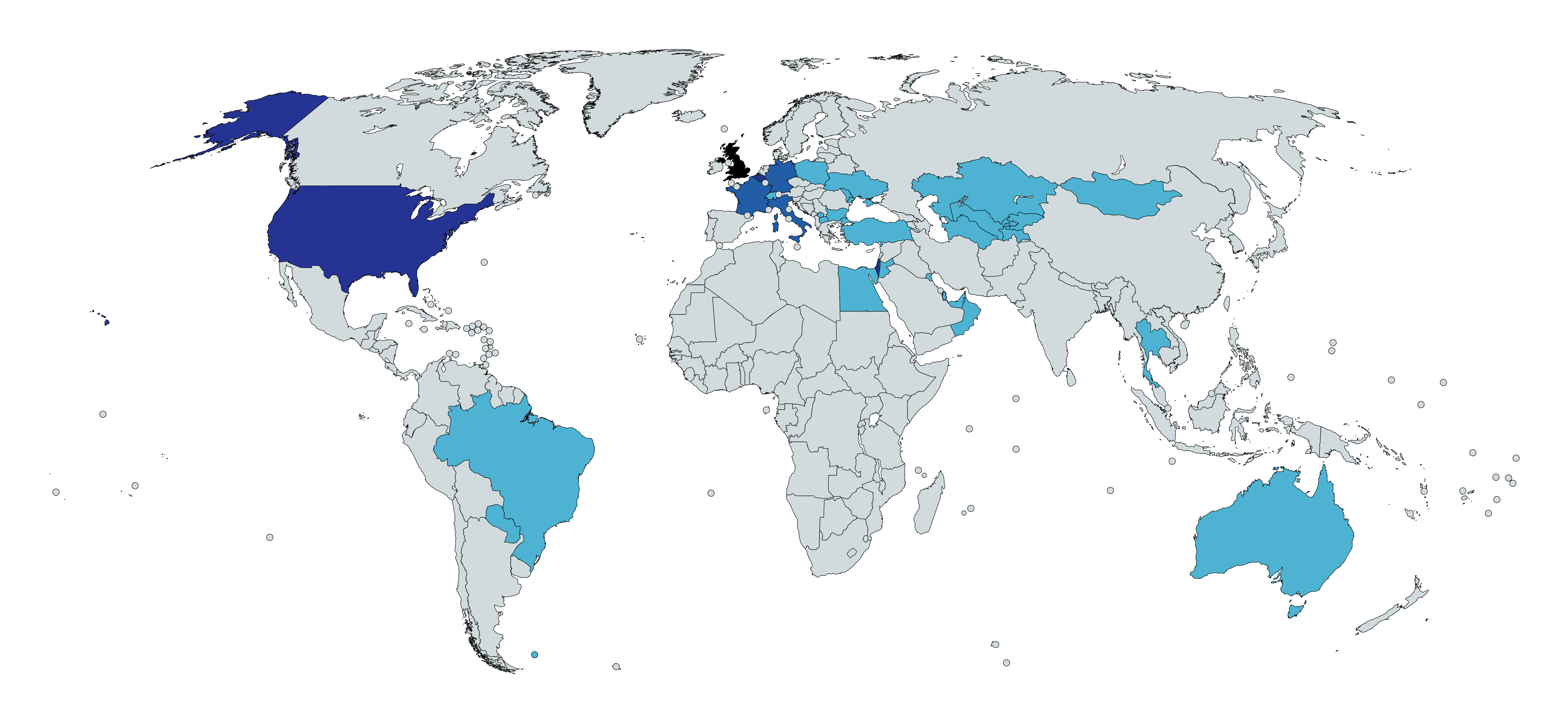
Map of international trips made by David Cameron as Foreign Secretary – March 2024: United Kingdom 3 visits 2 visits 1 visit

== David Lammy (2024-2025) ==
Lammy visited 56 countries and territories during his tenure as Foreign Secretary. He was the first UK Foreign Secretary to visit Ireland since 2017 and to visit Pakistan since 2021. He was the first to visit Syria since 2011, the first to visit Iceland since 2002 and the first ever to visit the Norwegian archipelago of Svalbard.

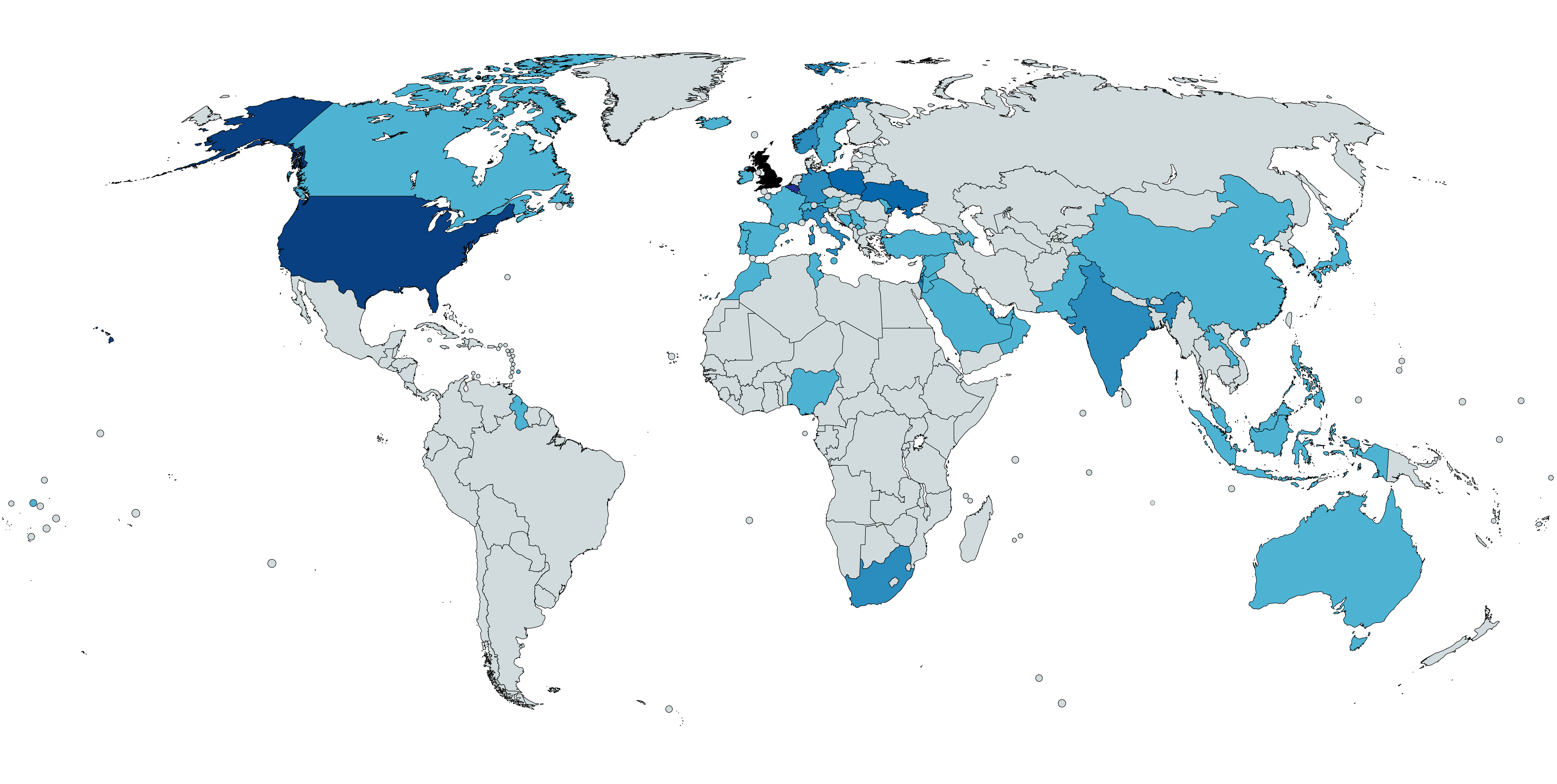
Map of international trips made by David Lammy as Foreign Secretary – July 2025: United Kingdom 5+ visits 4 visits 3 visits 2 visits 1 visit

== Yvette Cooper (2025-2026) ==
Cooper visited 26 countries during her tenure as Foreign Secretary.

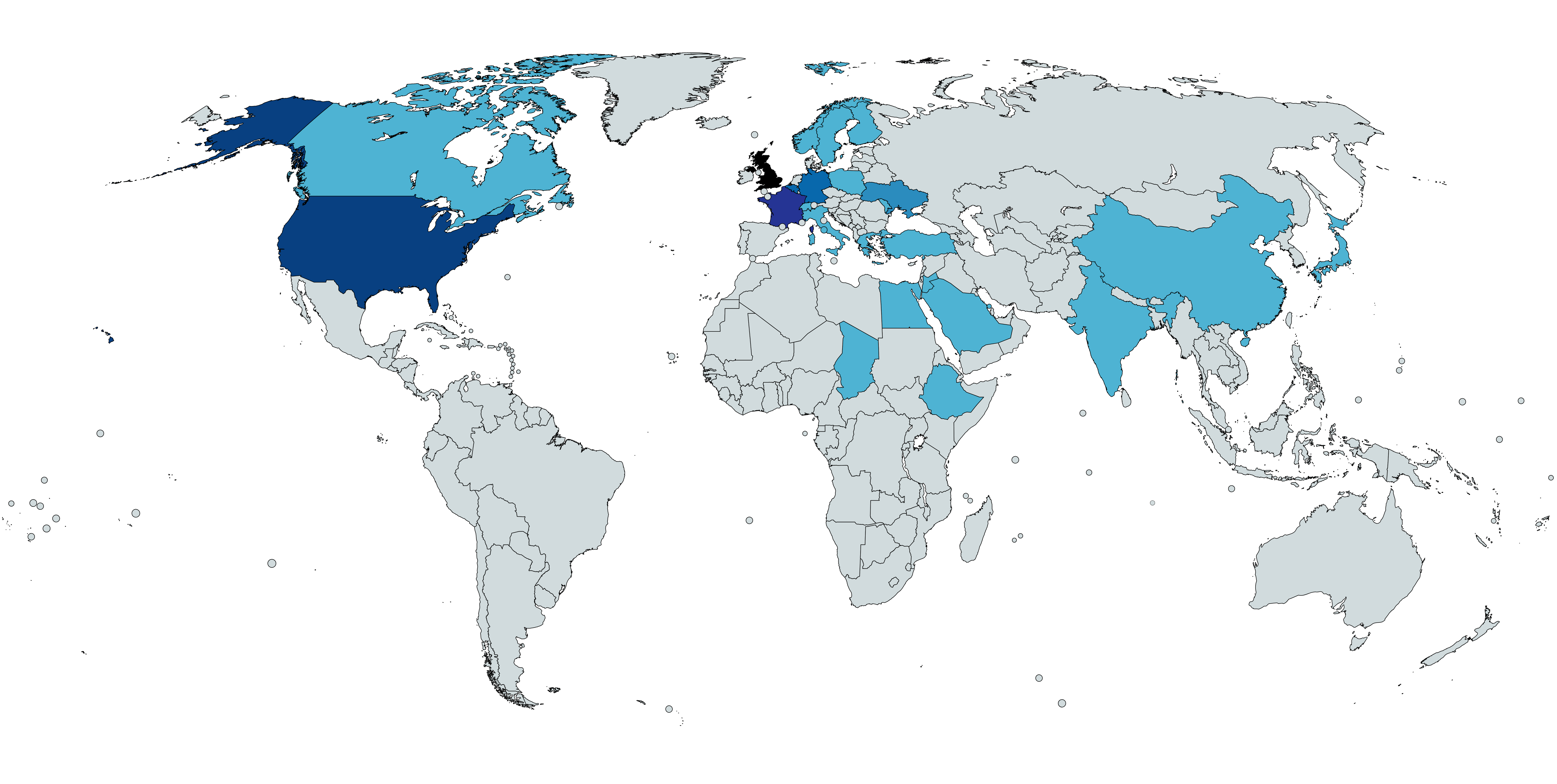
Map of international trips made by Yvette Cooper as Foreign Secretary – August 2026: United Kingdom 5+ visits 4 visits 3 visits 2 visits 1 visit

== Ed Miliband (2026-present) ==
Miliband has visited 6 countries thus far during his tenure as Foreign Secretary.

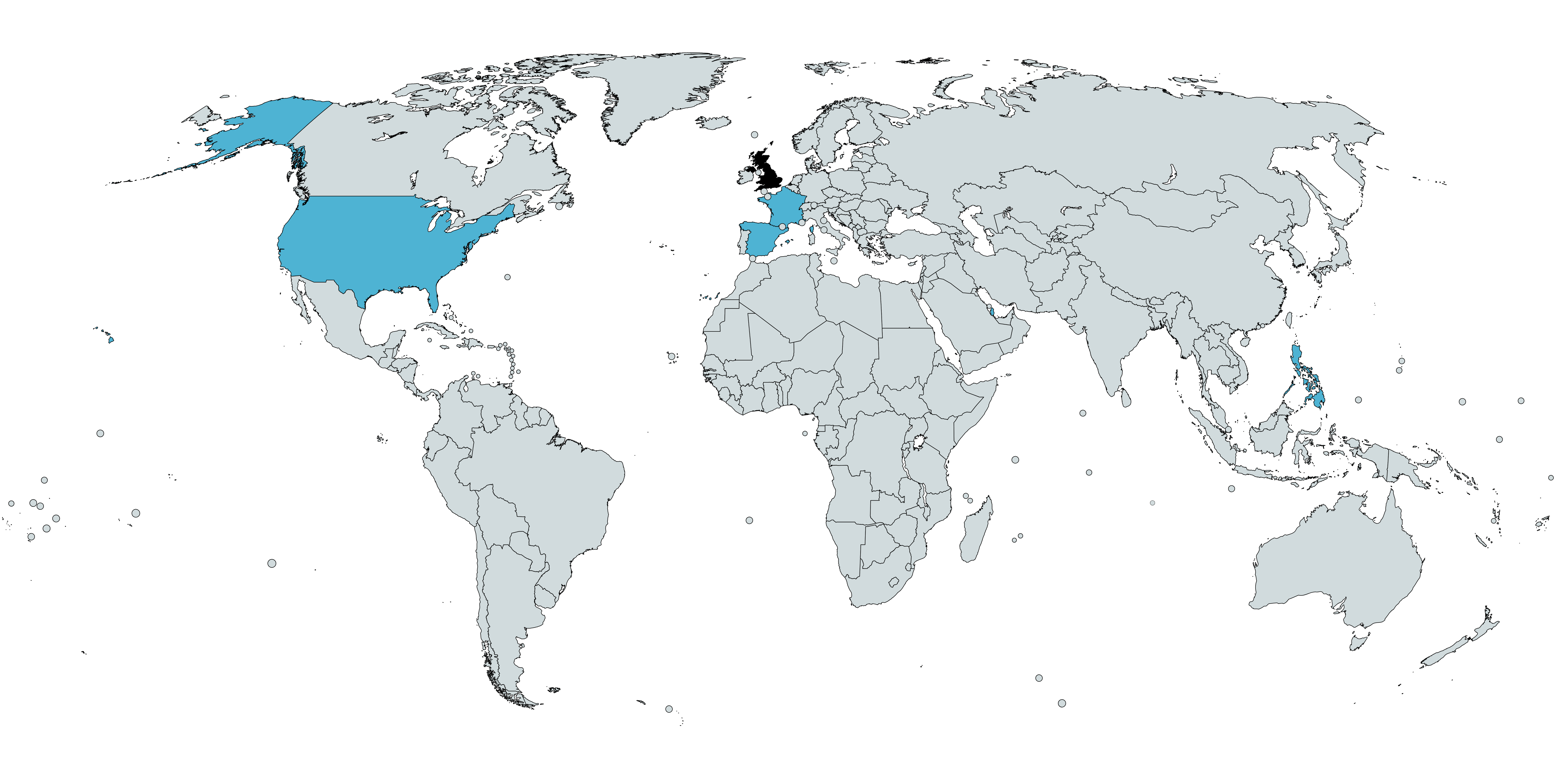
Map of international trips made by Ed Miliband as Foreign Secretary – July 2026: United Kingdom 1 visit
