= South China Global Talent Institute =

Think tank studying international talents in China

South China Global Talent Institute (Chinese: 南方国际人才研究院) is a think tank focusing on the study of international talents. Headquartered in Guangzhou (Canton), the institute serves as a part of the South Start-up Service Center of the "Thousand-talent Plan", which is administered by the Organization Department of the Chinese Communist Party. The institute was officially established in October 2012. Wang Huiyao, the Vice Chairman of the United Front Work Department's Western Returned Scholars Association (WRSA) and Director General of Center for China and Globalization, acts as the founding director.

== Background ==
In response to China's strategy of reinvigorating the country through human resources development, the Organization Department of CCP launched the Thousand Talents Plan in 2008. Proposed by Li Yuanchao, the Chinese Vice-president, who then acted as the head of the Organization Department, the South Start-up Service Center was created at the end of 2012. As part of the center, South China Global Talent Institute was founded at the same time. Leaders from the Talents Bureau of the Organization Department of the CCP Central Committee, the Ministry of Human Resources and Social Security, Guangdong provincial government and Guangzhou municipal government jointly inaugurated the institute.

== Positioning ==
Cooperating with the Center for China and Globalization, South China Global Talent Institute provides intellectual support for corporations as well as government agencies on talent issues. Activities include events, publications and research.

== Research projects ==
- International Talent Strategy Research
- Improvement on Green Card System of China
- Cooperation of Overseas Returnees and Local Private Enterprises
- Development of Overseas Chinese Professional Associations
- Advisory Report on Improving "Thousand-Talent" Plan

== Publications ==
- China and Globalization Research
- Globalizing China
- Global Talent Briefing
- Policy Recommendation References
- Immigration Tide
- National Strategy: Talents Will Change the World
- Talent War
- Movers on Wall Street
- The Blue Book Series

== Events ==
- Beijing Forum of WRSA
- Global Talents Conference
- Annual International Forum
- High-level Foreign Experts Seminar
- Round Table Meeting on International Talent Issues
