= Gina Chua =

Singaporean journalist

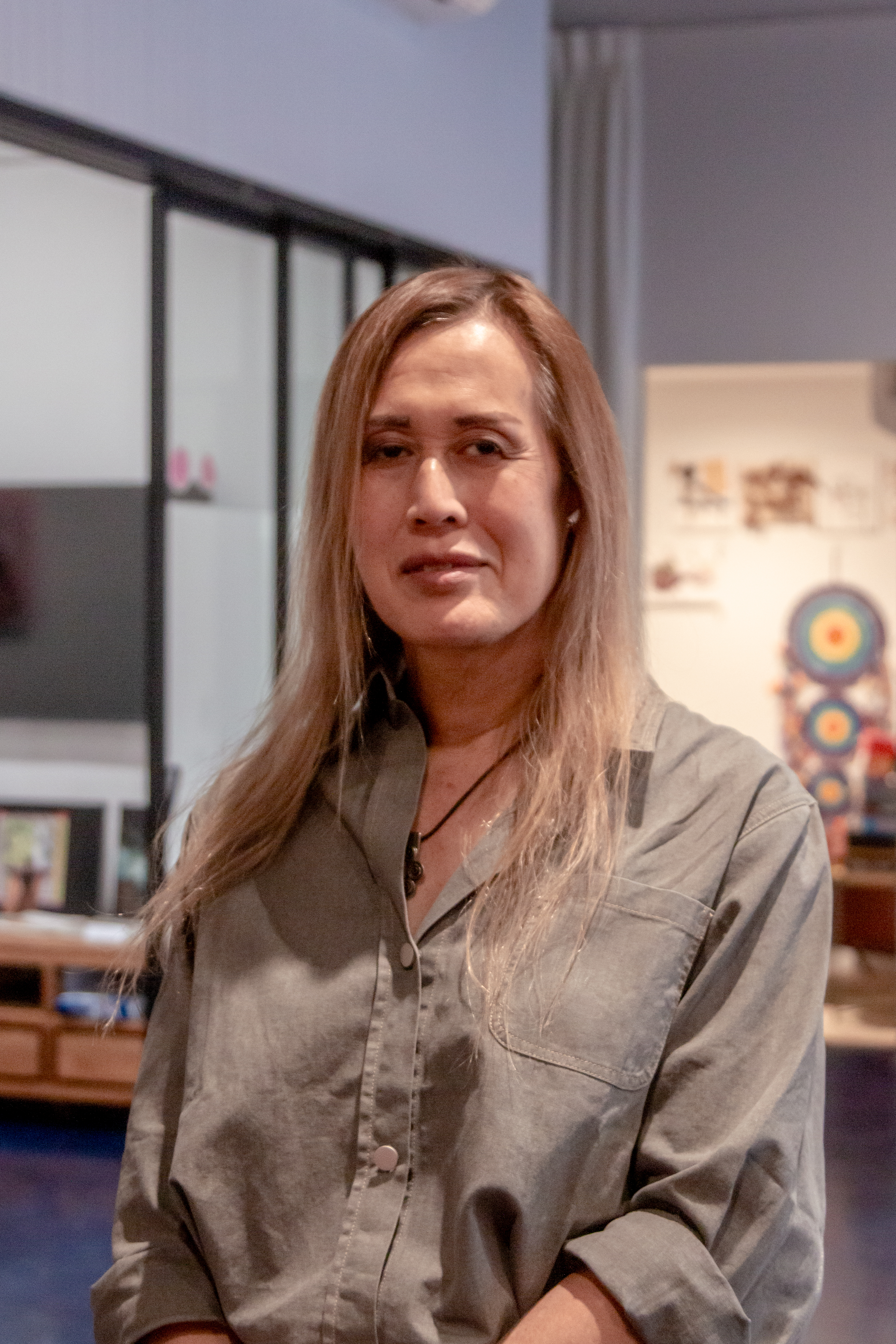
- Chua in Singapore, 2025
- Born: 1960 or 1961 (age 65–66); Singapore
- Education: University of Chicago; Columbia University
- Occupation: Executive Editor
- Employer(s): Semafor; City University of New York
- Website: ginachua.me

Gina Chua is a Singaporean journalist serving as the executive editor of the media startup Semafor, and executive director of the Tow-Knight Center at the Craig Newmark Graduate School of Journalism at the City University of New York. She previously served as the executive editor of the Reuters news agency. A trans woman, Chua is one of the most senior openly transgender journalists in the U.S.

== Early life and education ==
Born in Singapore, Chua attended high school in the Philippines, studied at the University of Chicago, earning a bachelor's degree in mathematics, and Columbia University, earning a master's degree in journalism.

== Career ==
Chua's first jobs in journalism included stints at Reuters, the Singapore Broadcasting Corporation and the Straits Times. Chua joined The Wall Street Journal in Manila in 1993, started the paper's Hanoi bureau in 1995 and in August 1997 was named editor of The Wall Street Journal Asia (known then as The Asian Wall Street Journal).

Chua moved to New York in 2005 and worked as The Wall Street Journal's assistant managing editor for budget and administration until 2008. In July 2009, Chua was named editor-in-chief of the South China Morning Post in Hong Kong and stepped down in March 2011.

Chua began working as an editor for Reuters in 2011 and was appointed executive editor in April 2021. In March 2022, Chua announced she would leave Reuters to become the executive editor of Semafor, a new media startup founded by journalist Ben Smith and former Bloomberg Media Group CEO Justin B. Smith.

Chua co-founded the Sigma Awards for data journalism with Aron Pilhofer in 2020. She has taught graduate- and undergraduate-level classes and short training courses on the business models of journalism, computer-assisted reporting, and numeracy at New York University, Hong Kong University, and Nanyang Technological University. She also created and found funding for a fellowship to bring Asian journalists for a Masters' in business and economic reporting at New York University.

In 2021, Chua was named the inaugural recipient of the Online News Association's Impact Award for "her dedication to innovation in visual storytelling and steadfast commitment to mentor journalists and address structural issues in the industry."

In 2024, Chua joined the Pulitzer Prize Board.

In 2025, Chua was named executive director of the Tow-Knight Center at the Craig Newmark Graduate School of Journalism at the City University of New York.

== Personal life ==
Chua transitioned to female in late 2020. Chua is the partner of Filipino journalist and Columbia University Graduate School of Journalism director Sheila Coronel. Chua has two adult children.
