= AUKUS =

Australia–UK–US security partnership

- Trilateral security partnership between Australia, the United Kingdom, and the United States

- Member states shown in dark green
- Abbreviation: AUKUS
- Formation: 15 September 2021; 5 years ago
- Type: Military technology partnership
- Purpose: Collective security
- Region served: Indo-Pacific
- Members: Australia; United Kingdom; United States

AUKUS (/ˈɔːkəs/ AW-kəs), also styled as Aukus, is a trilateral security partnership between Australia, the United Kingdom, and the United States, which have stated that its goals are to "promote a free and open Indo-Pacific that is secure and stable." Initially announced on 15 September 2021, the partnership involves two lines of effort referred to as pillars. Pillar 1 focuses on Australia acquiring nuclear-powered attack submarines and the rotational basing of US and UK nuclear-powered attack submarines in Australia. Pillar 2 entails the collaborative development of advanced capabilities in six technological areas: undersea capabilities, quantum technologies, artificial intelligence and autonomy, advanced cyber, hypersonic and counter-hypersonic capabilities, and electronic warfare; and in two broader functional areas: innovation and information sharing.

AUKUS is widely seen as a response to the perception among its members that the People's Republic of China poses a threat to the Indo-Pacific region. When the partnership was announced, the Chinese government said that it risked "severely damaging regional peace" and had a "cold-war mentality".

A direct result of the creation of the partnership was Australia's controversial cancellation of a French-Australian submarine contract worth €56 billion (A$90 billion). The Australian government only gave the French government a few hours' notice of this before the public announcement of AUKUS. The Australian government agreed to a €555 million (US$584 million) compensation settlement with French defence contractor Naval Group.

== Background ==
=== Naval Group–Australia strategic partnership agreement ===
In 2009, two years after the start of the project to replace the Royal Australian Navy's conventionally-powered Collins-class submarines, the Australian Defence White Paper stated: "The Government has ruled out nuclear propulsion for these submarines".

In 2016, Prime Minister of Australia Malcolm Turnbull signed a A$50 billion (€31 billion) deal with the majority French government-owned company Naval Group (known as DCNS until 2017) to design a new generation of submarines, known as the Attack class, under the "Future Submarine Program", scheduled to replace the Collins class. (Note: The exact build price and sustainment costs submitted by Naval Group to the Australian government are confidential. The government has refused to release the details under FOI. A decision by the OAIC to overturn the refusal and release the details is being appealed by the Department of Defence and Naval Group at the AAT).) The design was based on the latest French nuclear-powered attack submarine, the Barracuda class, which required converting the nuclear propulsion to conventional propulsion. Another difference was that Australia chose to equip it with a United States Navy combat system and torpedo with Lockheed Martin Australia selected to integrate them into the design. Australia typically requires that part of their vessels be built there, which increases the cost. In this case it corresponded to 60 per cent of the contract value, with France handling the technology transfer.

In 2019, Australia signed a strategic partnership agreement with Naval Group to design and construct twelve submarines to be built in Australia. However, the project was beset by delays and cost overruns, leading to uncertainty and tension behind the scenes. The revised cost, including inflation during the length of the program, was A$90 billion (€56 billion).

In February 2021, an initial design plan was rejected as being too expensive, and Naval Group were given until September to improve their proposal. At a Senate inquiry in early June 2021, with delays ongoing, Defence Secretary Greg Moriarty revealed under questioning that he had considered making contingency plans if the French project was to fail, admitting that there had been ongoing problems for over a year. Two weeks later, Australian prime minister Scott Morrison met French president Emmanuel Macron in Paris and expressed concern about the project going off track, to which Macron replied that France was giving "full and complete" commitment and would proceed "further and faster if possible".

On 30 August 2021, the French and Australian defence and foreign affairs ministers released a joint statement reaffirming the project, stating that the "Ministers underlined the importance of the Future Submarine program."

Less than three weeks later, Australia decided to publicly cancel the contract with Naval Group for the Attack class submarines despite having already spent about A$2.4 billion on the French project. It was expected that Australia would have to pay hundreds of millions of euros in penalties for cancelling the contract. The contract contained "control gates" with "off-ramps" at which point Australia could withdraw from the contract.

The Australian Department of Defence wrote to Naval Group on the same day the security partnership was announced. The French Ministry of Defence claim the department told them that "they were satisfied with the submarine's achievable performance and with the progress of the program." Naval Group said that Australia "terminated the contract for convenience".

Morrison said that Australia now required a nuclear-powered submarine which has clear advantages of greater endurance, speed, power, stealth and carrying capacity than a conventionally-powered submarine, based on changes in the strategic situation in the Indo-Pacific.

=== Australia–UK–US negotiations ===
The Sunday Telegraph reported that in March 2021 the Australian navy chief Vice Admiral Michael Noonan met in London with his British counterpart Admiral Tony Radakin and requested assistance from the UK and the US in acquiring nuclear-powered submarines. The Daily Telegraph reported that British Foreign Secretary Dominic Raab "helped broker the deal". The New York Times also reported that Australia first approached the UK for assistance. The Wall Street Journal reported Australia approached the US in April 2021. A trilateral discussion was held between Johnson, Biden and Morrison at the June 2021 G7 summit held in Cornwall, England. The talks took place without the knowledge of the French government or Naval Group. This approach was possible as a result of the UK not entering into a formal foreign policy and security treaty in the post-Brexit deal with the EU. As a result, the UK was free to pursue enhanced cooperation with other allies. Axios reported that the Biden administration sought assurances from Australia that cancelling the contract was not dependent on the US providing them with assistance and that cancelling was a fait accompli. Morrison said Australia had been considering an alternative to the Attack class submarine deal for the past 18 months.

Although the joint announcement by Australian prime minister Scott Morrison, British prime minister Boris Johnson and US president Joe Biden did not mention any other country by name, except France, anonymous White House sources have alleged it is designed to counter the influence of Chinese forces in the Indo-Pacific region. However, Johnson later told parliament that the move was not intended to be "adversarial towards any other power".

United States secretary of state Antony Blinken and United States secretary of defense Lloyd Austin said that Australia did not have any "reciprocal requirements" as a consequence of the US sharing nuclear submarine propulsion technology such as Australia hosting intermediate-range missiles.

== Features ==
=== Pillar 1 – Nuclear-powered submarines ===
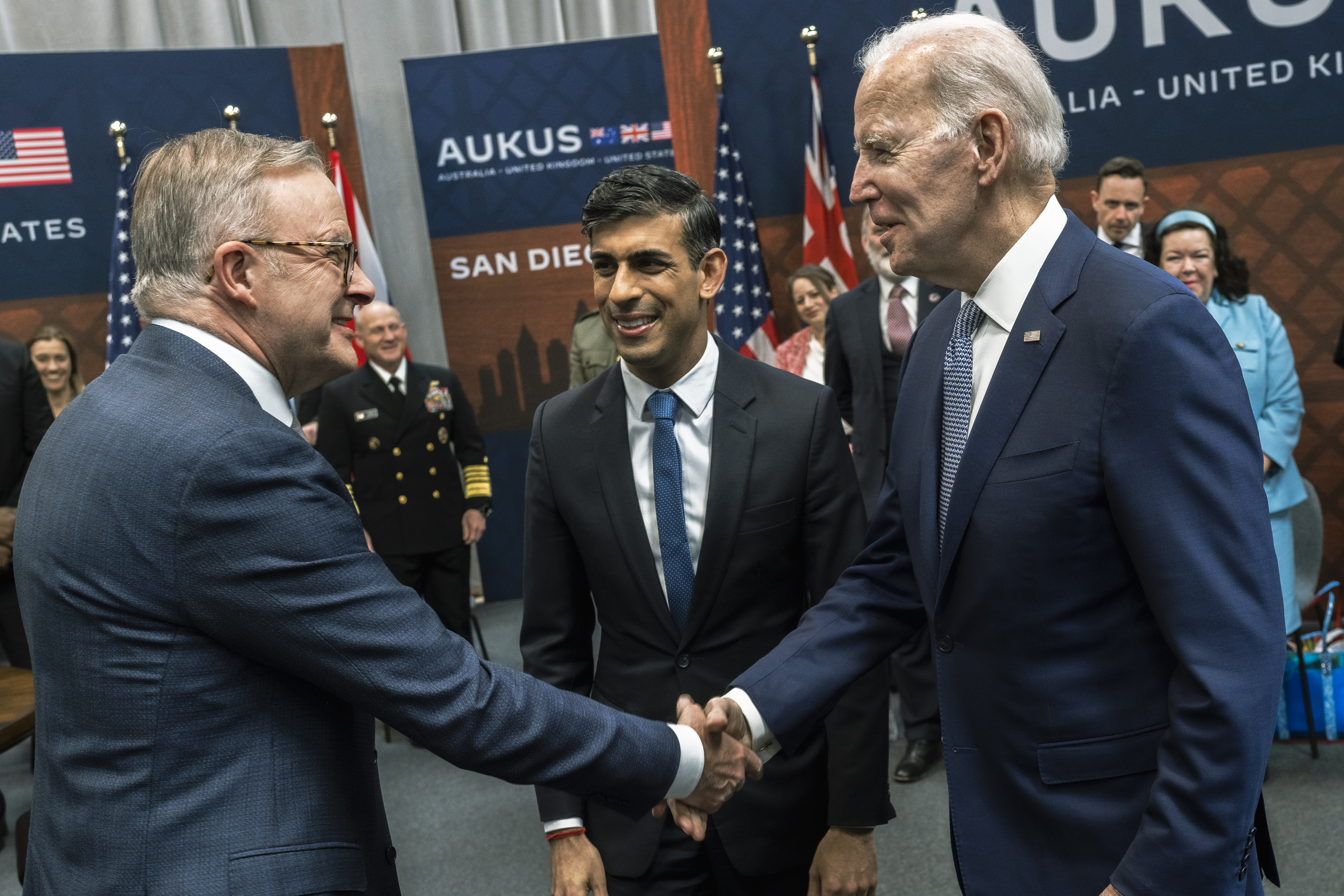
US president Joe Biden, UK prime minister Rishi Sunak and Australian prime minister Anthony Albanese at the AUKUS meeting in San Diego, California, on 13 March 2023

Under the partnership, the US and UK will share nuclear propulsion technology with Australia, as they have done with each other since 1958 under the US–UK Mutual Defence Agreement. The Royal Australian Navy (RAN) will acquire at least eight nuclear-powered submarines armed with conventional weapons. The basic design and key technologies will be decided by the Australian Nuclear-Powered Submarine Task Force an 18-month Department of Defence research project headed by Vice Admiral Jonathan Mead, begun in September 2021 with assistance from the US and UK.

Australia will extend the life of its Collins class submarines that the Attack class was due to replace and may consider leasing or buying nuclear-powered submarines from the US or the UK in the interim until the delivery of its future nuclear powered submarines. Also in the interim, Australian Defence Minister Peter Dutton said that Australia will have regular visits by US and UK nuclear-powered submarines. (Note: The 2012 Australian Defence Force Posture Review recommended that Australia's submarine base at HMAS Stirling in Perth be expanded and be able to support US Navy (USN) submarines.) The annual Australia-US Ministerial Consultations (AUSMIN) between the Australian Ministers for Foreign Affairs and Defence and the US Secretaries of State and Defense held in September 2021 endorsed "increasing logistics and sustainment capabilities of US surface and subsurface vessels in Australia."

Australia considered purchasing French nuclear submarines which use nuclear reactors fuelled by low-enriched uranium at less than 6%. However, French reactor designs have to be refuelled every ten years, and Australia does not have a civil nuclear capability with nuclear energy prohibited. In contrast, American and British designs power the submarines for the expected life of the submarines using nuclear reactors fuelled by highly enriched uranium (HEU) at 93% enrichment.

Currently, six countries have nuclear submarines, the five permanent members of the UN Security Council (China, France, Russia, the United Kingdom and the United States) and India. The New York Times reported that Australia will probably buy HEU from the US for the nuclear reactor that powers the submarine. (Note: Even though Australia is a leading producer of uranium, it has never operated nuclear power plants.) The United States' naval reactors are all pressurized water reactors (PWR). The latest UK propulsion system is the Rolls-Royce PWR3 that will power the Royal Navy's (RN) new Dreadnought-class submarines currently being built and is "based on a US design but using UK reactor technology".

US officials have said that sharing nuclear propulsion technology with Australia is a "one-off" and that they have no "intention of extending this to other countries". South Korea, also a US treaty ally, has had ambitions to acquire nuclear-powered submarines since 2017 and was reportedly refused US assistance in September 2020 because of nuclear non-proliferation.

On 22 November 2021, Australia, the US and the UK signed the Exchange of Naval Nuclear Propulsion Information Agreement (ENNPIA) treaty. The treaty permits the disclosure of information by the US and the UK to Australia and its use. The US is restricted by the Atomic Energy Act of 1946 from sharing information without an agreement and the UK is also restricted by the 1958 US-UK Mutual Defence Agreement unless authorised. The treaty was considered in Australia by the Parliament's Joint Standing Committee on Treaties, in the UK by the Parliament and in the US by Congress. The ENNPIA treaty entered into force on 8 February 2022.

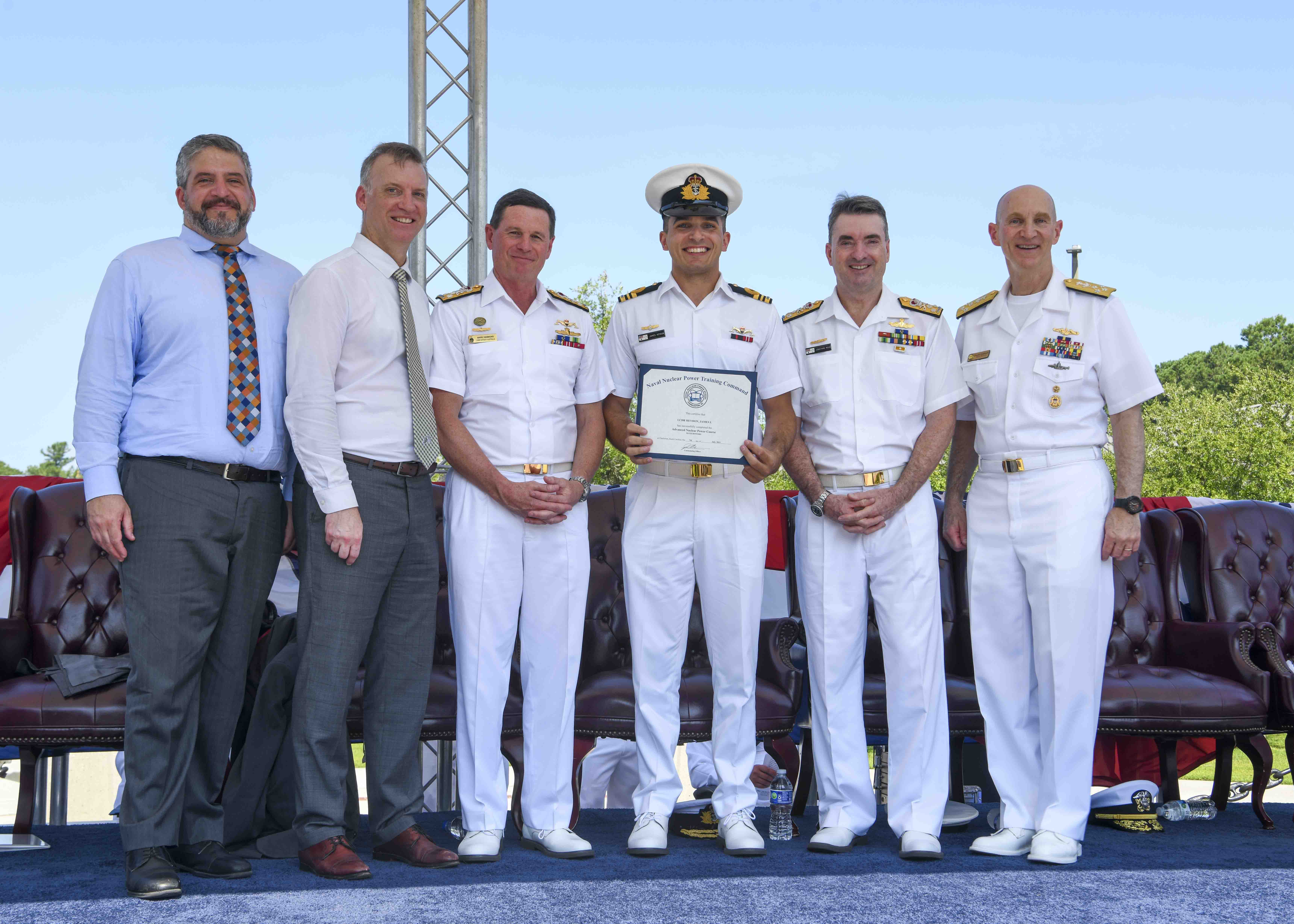
One of the first three Royal Australian Navy officers to graduate from the US Navy's Nuclear Power School posing with Australian and American dignitaries in July 2023

On 31 August 2022, the UK announced that Australian submariners would receive training aboard Astute-class submarines.

On 13 March 2023, AUKUS announced that a new nuclear powered submarine class would be built in the UK and Australia to be called the SSN-AUKUS, also known as the SSN-A. The US intends to sell Australia three nuclear-powered Virginia class submarines, subject to congressional approval, to ensure there is no capability gap as the Collins class submarines are retired, with the potential to sell up to two more if needed. RAN personnel are embedded in the RN and USN to receive nuclear training and at UK and US submarine industrial bases. The Submarine Rotational Force-West initiative which will from as early as 2027 base USN Virginia class and RN Astute class submarines on a rotational basis at the RAN's HMAS Stirling submarine base in order to accelerate Australia's ability to operate nuclear-powered submarines and to contribute to security in the Indo-Pacific region.

The SSN-AUKUS class will based on the UK SSNR design already under development. The RN is planned to receive its first SSN-AUKUS class submarine as early as the late 2030s. The RAN is planned to receive their first submarine in the early 2040s. Australia will reportedly build five SSN-AUKUS submarines. The RAN is planned to receive their first Virginia class submarine from the US in the early 2030s.

The Australian Submarine Agency was established on 1 July 2023. It has the role of managing the Australian nuclear submarine program, and includes personnel posted to the UK and US.

In November 2023, Capt. Lincoln Reifsteck USN, the USN's AUKUS integration and acquisition program manager, talked at the Naval Submarine League's annual symposium. He said that, in 2032 and 2035, the US will sell to Australia in-service Block IV Virginia class submarines, the first of which was commissioned in 2020, and the final will likely commission around 2026. Thus, Australia would receive submarines with between six and 15 years' worth of use, out of their designed service life of 33 years. He also said that the US would sell a new Block VII boat to Australia in 2038, the Block VIIs being the original Virginia class length without the Virginia Payload Module, set to begin construction in FY2029.

In August 2024, Australian prime minister Anthony Albanese, made undisclosed "political commitments" with its AUKUS partners in an agreement for the transfer of naval nuclear technology to Australia, sparking concerns about the potential for high-level radioactive waste to be stored in the country. The White House confirmed that Australia, the UK, and the US reached a significant milestone in their cooperation, essential for Australia's future nuclear-powered submarine capabilities. Despite assurances from the government, critics, including the Greens, warned of possible loopholes that could lead to uranium enrichment and radioactive waste management in Australia.

On 1 June 2025, the UK government announced that it will build up to twelve SSN-AUKUS submarines to replace the Royal Navy's seven Astute-class attack submarines from the late 2030s. The announcement also said that there will be a major expansion of industrial capability at BAE Systems Submarines at Barrow and at Rolls-Royce Submarines at Derby, with a new boat scheduled to be built every eighteen months. On 26 July 2025, the UK and Australian governments signed the Geelong Treaty, a 50-year bilateral defence agreement to facilitate bilateral cooperation on the construction of Australia's SSN-AUKUS submarines.

By November 2025, 10% of USN attack submarine crews were Australian, with 170 qualified or training RAN officers and sailors. On 30 May 2026, at an AUKUS Defence Minister's Meeting held in Singapore it was announced that the third Virginia-class boat that Australia is planned to receive will now be an in-service Block IV boat the same as the first two. This will simplify fleet training and maintenance for Australia and save them significant costs.

In October 2026, the Australian Defence Minister Richard Marles announced in a joint statement with UK and US counterparts that the first submarine to be based at HMAS Stirling as part of Submarine Rotational Force-West would be the Virginia class USS Colorado from late 2027.

=== Pillar 2 – Advanced Capabilities ===
AUKUS Pillar 2 encompasses a wide array of activities (including many commonly referred to by the US Department of Defense as international armaments cooperation). There may include information and personnel exchange, cooperative research, development, testing, and evaluation, and joint production. In contrast to Pillar 1 activities, which will take decades to deliver results, Pillar 2 is likely to produce more immediate capability improvements.

==== Undersea Capabilities ====
Undersea capabilities, in the context of AUKUS, refer to systems and technologies that operate underwater but are not crewed submarines. Pillar 2 activities in this area include the “AUKUS Maritime Autonomy Experimentation and Exercise Series,” which the three governments have described as “a series of integrated trilateral experiments and exercises aimed at enhancing capability development, improving interoperability, and increasing the sophistication and scale of autonomous systems in the maritime domain.” The AUKUS governments are also working on the ability to deploy and recover UUVs (Uncrewed Underwater Vehicles) from crewed submarines (sometimes referred to as “launch and recovery”), conducting activities to develop and improve “the ability to launch and recover undersea vehicles from torpedo tubes on current classes of submarines to deliver effects such as strike and intelligence, surveillance, and reconnaissance.” In November 2023, the United States Department of Defense announced that the AUKUS partners had participated in a joint exercise to demonstrate and improve capabilities relating to the protection of underwater infrastructure and the use of autonomous and semiautonomous undersea systems.

The Defence Minister's meeting on 30 May 2026 announced that the first signature project of Pillar 2 would be cutting-edge sensors, payloads and weapons systems for UUVs with delivery to commence in 2027.

==== Quantum Technologies ====
As part of the Quantum Technologies working group, the AUKUS nations have established the AUKUS Quantum Arrangement (AQuA), an initiative to coordinate U.S., British, and Australian RDT&E efforts concerning quantum technologies. Initial AQuA efforts were expected to focus on developing alternate solutions for position, navigation, and timing (similar to current Global Positioning System capability) through trials and experimentation through 2025. Additionally, the AUKUS governments announced in December 2023 that they were “accelerating the development of quantum technologies for positioning, navigation, and timing in military capabilities,” with a particular focus on improving “resilience for our trilateral forces in Global Positioning System-degraded environments and enhance stealth in the undersea domain.”

==== Advanced Cyber ====
The announcement of AUKUS included the stated aim of improving "joint capabilities and interoperability. These initial efforts will focus on cyber capabilities, artificial intelligence, quantum technologies, and additional undersea capabilities." Tom Tugendhat, chair of the British Commons' Foreign Affairs Committee, later commented on Twitter that "Bringing together the military-industrial complex of these three allies together is a step-change in the relationship. We've always been interoperable, but this aims at much more. From artificial intelligence to advanced technology the US, UK and Australia will now be able to cost save by increasing platform sharing and innovation costs. Particularly for the smaller two, that's game-changing." Engineering & Technology pointed to the increasing expansion of Chinese technology firms such as Huawei, which has been excluded from tendering for participation in telecommunications networks by the US and Australia on national security grounds, and government vetoes over the attempted Chinese acquisition of American company Lattice Semiconductor and ongoing British consideration of proposed takeovers of local semiconductor firms. Engineering & Technology also pointed to the March 2021 statement of the US National Security Commission on AI, of the imperative to intensify local efforts but also "rally our closest allies and partners to defend and compete in the coming era of AI-accelerated competition and conflict".

==== Hypersonic and Counter-Hypersonic Capabilities ====
Under the partnership, the three countries will cooperate to accelerate development of hypersonic missiles and defence against such missiles. Hypersonic and counter-hypersonic cooperation was one of four additional areas of cooperation announced on 5 April 2022. Australia and the US have been cooperating on the development of hypersonic missiles since 2020 after signing an agreement to "flight test full-size prototype hypersonic cruise missiles" under the Southern Cross Integrated Flight Research Experiment (SCIFiRE).

==== Other Pillar 2 activities ====
The AUKUS partners have announced they will “pursue opportunities in Long Range Fires under AUKUS Pillar II in 2024,” and have also announced the establishment of a Deep Space Advanced Radar Capability (DARC) program to constantly track, detect, and identify objects in deep space from up to 22,000 miles away from Earth (the first will be built in Western Australia and is expected to be operational by 2026, with the radars based in the UK and the US aimed to be completed by 2030). In addition, the U.S., British, and Australian governments have established a number of initiatives designed to support Pillar 2 efforts as a whole, such as the AUKUS Advanced Capabilities Industry Forum and the AUKUS Defense Investors Network.

== Expansion ==
=== Japan ===
Since the announcement of "Pillar II" of AUKUS, there has been persistent speculation that Japan will eventually join the partnership; American Ambassador to Japan Rahm Emanuel wrote that Japan was "about to become the first additional Pillar II partner" in The Wall Street Journal on 3 April 2024. On 7 April 2024, the Financial Times reported that AUKUS defence ministers will announce on 8 April 2024 that they will launch talks related to the expansion of Pillar II of the alliance. While many officials in the US government advocate the inclusion of Japan in AUKUS, notably Deputy Secretary of State Kurt Campbell, there has been push back for months from the UK and Australia partly in order to focus on ironing out existing complications in AUKUS, however primarily over concerns that Japan lacks the security systems required to protect highly sensitive information.

In September 2024, the leaders of Australia, the UK and the US issued a joint statement announcing that AUKUS partners and Japan were exploring opportunities to improve interoperability of their maritime autonomous systems as an initial area of cooperation.

=== New Zealand ===
New Zealand has agreed to officially explore the potential benefits of joining Pillar 2. In March 2023, New Zealand's defence minister Andrew Little said New Zealand had been offered the opportunity to discuss joining AUKUS for the non-submarine co-operation areas. New Zealand has indicated it was "willing to explore" the proposal. In July 2023, US Secretary of State Antony Blinken told New Zealand reporters that the “door is open” for New Zealand, as well as other countries, to join the security partnership. In December 2023, following the formation of a new government, Prime Minister Christopher Luxon said that New Zealand was open to joining the non-nuclear pillar of the AUKUS agreement during a state visit to Australia.

In February 2024, Australia agreed to brief New Zealand on Pillar 2 developments following a joint bilateral meeting between Australian and New Zealand foreign and defence ministers in Melbourne. Australian Defence Minister Richard Marles confirmed that Australia would send officials to brief their New Zealand counterparts on Pillar 2. The four ministers also issued a joint statement expressing concerns about human rights violations in Xinjiang, Tibet and Hong Kong. In response to the joint Australian-NZ bilateral meeting, the Chinese Embassy in Wellington issued a statement deploring critical statements about China's internal affairs and describing AUKUS as "counter to the letter and spirit of the international nuclear non-proliferation regime". On 12 February, the New Zealand Labour Party also reversed its previous support for the Pillar Two component of AUKUS, with associate foreign spokesperson Phil Twyford describing AUKUS as an "offensive warfighting alliance against China." Similar sentiments were echoed by former Labour Prime Minister Helen Clark, who expressed concern that the National-led coalition government was shifting New Zealand foreign policy away from a bipartisan nuclear free policy and getting the country drawn into geopolitical games.

In September 2024, the leaders of Australia, the UK and the US issued a joint statement announcing that they were consulting with Canada, New Zealand, and South Korea to identify possibilities for collaboration on advanced capabilities under AUKUS Pillar II.

=== Others ===
The following non-participating nations were also subject to media speculation about potentially joining:

- Canada
- India
- South Korea

== Nuclear proliferation concerns ==
The Nuclear Nonproliferation Treaty allows non-nuclear-weapon states to produce the highly enriched uranium for naval reactor fuel. Nevertheless, the agreement to transfer US or UK nuclear submarine technology including possibly highly enriched uranium has been described as an act of nuclear proliferation, and has been criticised by scholars and politicians. In the Bulletin of the Atomic Scientists, scholar Sébastien Philippe criticised AUKUS and wrote "we can now expect the proliferation of very sensitive military nuclear technology in the coming years, with literally tons of new nuclear materials under loose or no international safeguards". James M. Acton of the Carnegie Endowment for International Peace wrote that "the nonproliferation implications of the AUKUS submarine deal are both negative and serious. For Australia to operate nuclear-powered submarines, it will have to become the first non-nuclear-weapon state to exercise a loophole that allows it to remove nuclear material from the inspection system of the International Atomic Energy Agency. I have no real concerns that Australia will misuse this material itself, but I am concerned that this removal will set a damaging precedent. In the future, would-be proliferators could use naval reactor programs as cover for the development of nuclear weapons."

Australia and Brazil (Note: See Brazilian submarine Álvaro Alberto.) would be the first countries without nuclear weapons to have nuclear-powered submarines. Concerns were raised that this may lead to increased risk of arms proliferation if other countries follow the same approach because it would involve other countries enriching uranium for naval reactors, potentially creating more avenues to develop material needed for nuclear weapons without the safeguards provided by regular inspections.

== Comments and responses from participating countries ==
Territories and territorial waters of Australia (yellow), the United Kingdom (blue), and the United States (green), including the respective Antarctic claims of Australia and the UK.

=== Australia ===
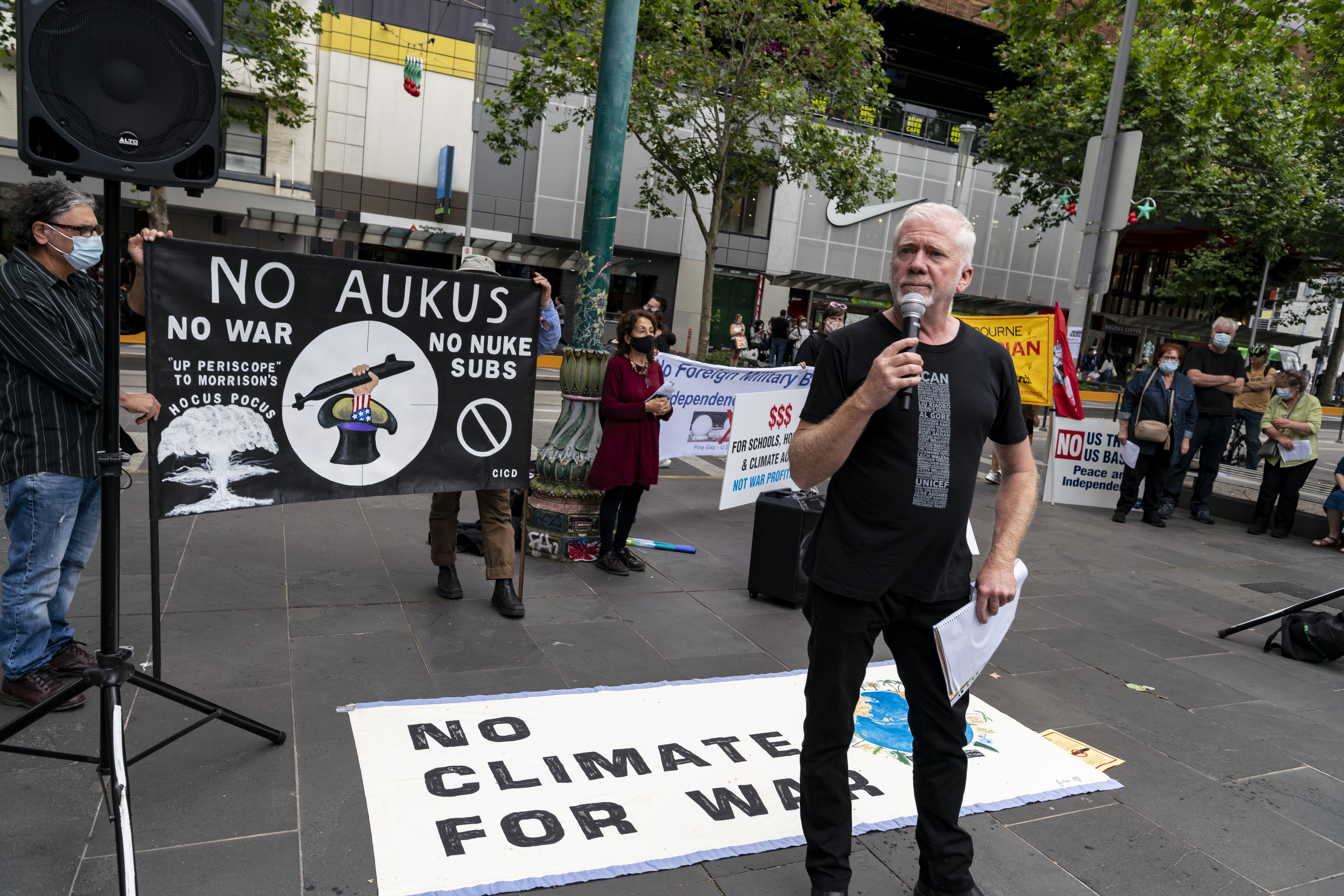
A speaker during a December 2021 protest against the AUKUS agreement in Melbourne

The federal opposition leader at the time, Anthony Albanese, of the Australian Labor Party, said that his party would support nuclear submarines as long as there was no requirement to have a domestic civil nuclear industry, no possession of nuclear weapons and that the deal is consistent with Australia's responsibilities under the nuclear non-proliferation treaty. Former Labor prime minister Paul Keating condemned the deal, saying "This arrangement would witness a further dramatic loss of Australian sovereignty, as material dependency on the United States robbed Australia of any freedom or choice in any engagement Australia may deem appropriate". Former Labor prime minister Kevin Rudd warned against overly obtrusive criticism of China and recommended that Australia focus on quietly improving military capability.

Former Liberal prime minister Malcolm Turnbull, who had signed the original deal for the Attack class submarines called the decision to scrap the deal "an appalling episode in Australia's international affairs and the consequences of it will endure to our disadvantage for a very long time". He called the actions of his successor as deceitful and that it would damage Australia as foreign nations would no longer be able to trust Australia.

Former Liberal prime minister Tony Abbott called the move "the biggest decision that any Australian government has made in decades" as "it indicates that we are going to stand shoulder to shoulder with the United States and the United Kingdom in meeting the great strategic challenge of our time, which obviously, is China". Abbott said that Australia would be safer as a result, and cited China's increasing naval firepower as a justification for the deal.

The Australian defence minister at the time, Peter Dutton, responded by saying that Australia wanted peace and stability and "an opportunity for Indonesia, Vietnam and Sri Lanka and Korea to continue to develop". Dutton further dismissed "outbursts from China" and said that Australia was a "proud democracy" committed to "enduring peace and this collaboration makes it a safer region ... no amount of propaganda can dismiss the facts".

Australian Greens leader Adam Bandt criticised the deal, saying that it escalates tensions in the region and "makes Australia less safe".

=== United Kingdom ===
Prime Minister at the time, Boris Johnson, said that the deal would create "hundreds of high-skilled jobs" and "preserve security and stability around the world" but said that the relationship with France was "rock solid". Conservative MP Tom Tugendhat said: "After years of bullying and trade hostility, and watching regional neighbours like the Philippines see encroachment into their waters, Australia didn't have a choice, and nor did the US or UK [to make the deal]". Former prime minister Theresa May questioned whether the UK would be forced into a war with China should Taiwan be invaded.

Johnson responded to French anger on 21 September by saying "I just think it's time for some of our dearest friends around the world to prenez un grip about this and donnez-moi un break"; the latter being broken French for "get a grip and give me a break". He made further reference to the deal in his speech at the Conservative Party Conference the next month, touting it as "a supreme example of global Britain in action, of something daring and brilliant that would simply would not have happened if we'd remained in the EU", whilst acknowledging "a certain raucous squawkus from the anti-AUKUS caucus."

Foreign Secretary at the time, Liz Truss viewed AUKUS as the beginning of a "Network of Liberty", and also stated "On security we are striking new pacts to protect our sea routes, trade routes and freedoms", adding that "We are in talks with Japan about better military access and operational support between our two countries [and] we want closer security ties with key allies like India and Canada in everything from fighting cyber to traditional defence capability".

In 2026, the Defence Select Committee inquiry on AUKUS found that the political leadership of the programme had faded and that the UK commitment to Astute-class submarine visits to Australia had placed severe pressure on the overstretched Royal Navy. Responsibility for AUKUS had been transferred from the Cabinet Office to the Ministry of Defence, though the view that Prime Ministerial leadership would be important to maintaining the political impetus to deliver AUKUS was reported. The MOD had forecast that the UK nuclear workforce (defence plus civil) will need to increase by 40,000 by 2030 to support AUKUS and the wider demands on the Defence Nuclear Enterprise. To 2026, the UK government had committed £16 billion to developing AUKUS: long lead components for SSN-AUKUS, BAE and Rolls-Royce plant upgrades, and the Rolls-Royce nuclear reactors for submarines. It noted that trilateral progress on advanced technology under Pillar 2 had been inadequate and was losing credibility.

=== United States ===
President Joe Biden stated that the deal was a way to "address both the current strategic environment in the (Indo-Pacific) region and how it may evolve". After a call between the French and US presidents, the White House acknowledged the crisis could have been averted if there had been open consultations between allies. It was agreed the process would continue in such manner.

In June 2025, the United States Department of Defense launched a review to inform whether to modify or cancel the AUKUS agreement with Australia and the United Kingdom, after a push by the Under Secretary of Defense for Policy, Elbridge Colby.

In November 2026 the US Congressional Budget Office found that the US submarine industrial base is currently struggling to meet the Navy's demand for submarines. AUKUS would reduce the number of attack submarines available to the navy for many years. Australia denied that this was true.

== International responses ==
=== Japan ===
On 12 April 2022, Sankei Shimbun reported that the United States, United Kingdom, and Australia were inquiring about Japan's participation in the security framework of AUKUS. The newspaper added that the aim of said negotiations was related to the incorporation of Japanese hypersonic weapon development and the strengthening of electronic warfare capabilities. Prior to this, in November 2021, former prime minister Shinzo Abe in a virtual address to the Sydney Dialogue, welcomed the creation of AUKUS in the midst of an increasingly severe security environment, and called for greater Japan-AUKUS cooperation and integration concerning artificial intelligence and cyberwarfare capabilities. The US denied inviting Japan into the security alliance, with Jen Psaki stating that Sankei Shimbun's report was "inaccurate". This was followed by another denial from Hirokazu Matsuno, the Japanese chief cabinet secretary. On 10 December 2022, Australia's Minister for Defence announced their desire for Japan to join the partnership.

On 14 March 2023, Japanese prime minister Kishida Fumio expressed his support for Australia's planned acquisition of US-made nuclear-powered submarines under the AUKUS partnership.

=== France ===
The French government received official notification from Australia that the Attack class submarine project was to be cancelled only a few hours before it was publicly announced. Le Monde reported that the original cost of the project in 2016 was €35 billion of which €8 billion (A$12 billion) was to go to French companies. The project was reportedly going to employ 4,000 people in France over six years at Naval Group and its 200 subcontractors. The French government was angered by both the cancellation of the Attack class submarine project and not being made aware of the negotiations that led to the AUKUS agreement. In a joint statement, French foreign minister Jean-Yves Le Drian and armed forces minister Florence Parly expressed disappointment at Australia's decision to abandon their joint submarine program with France.

On 31 October 2021, at the G20 summit in Rome, Macron was asked whether he thought that PM Morrison lied about the French submarine contract, to which Macron responded "I don't think, I know". The French Ambassador also criticised Morrison on the basis that he lied about the former contract.

Le Drian further stated in a radio interview that the contract termination was a "stab in the back". On 17 September, France recalled its ambassadors from Australia and the US, Jean-Pierre Thébault and Philippe Étienne respectively. Despite tension in the past, France had never before withdrawn its ambassador to the United States. In a statement, Le Drian said that the "exceptional decision is justified by the exceptional gravity of the [AUKUS] announcements" and that the snap cancellation of the submarine contract "constitute[d] unacceptable behaviour between allies and partners". French president Emmanuel Macron has not commented but is reported to have been "furious" about the turn of events. In response to questions about the Australia-EU trade deal currently being negotiated, French secretary of state for European affairs Clément Beaune stated that he doesn't see how France can trust Australia. Arnaud Danjean, a French MEP, said that "Australians can expect more than a delay in concluding the Free Trade Agreement with the EU". French Lowy Institute policy analyst Hervé Lemahieu said the diplomatic damage from the cancellation will take years to repair and leave a lasting legacy of mistrust". After a call between the French and US presidents, the French ambassador returned to the US on 30 September.

Beaune described the United Kingdom as a junior partner and vassal of the United States due to the partnership, saying in an interview: "Our British friends explained to us they were leaving the EU to create Global Britain. We can see that this is a return into the American lap and a form of accepted vassalisation." Le Drian stated that "We have recalled our ambassadors to [Canberra and Washington] to re-evaluate the situation. With Britain, there is no need. We know their constant opportunism. So there is no need to bring our ambassador back to explain." A Franco-British defence summit was cancelled.

Some opposition politicians in France, such as Xavier Bertrand, Jordan Bardella, and Fabien Roussel, criticised the French government and demanded that France leave NATO, with Christian Jacob as well as demanding a parliamentary inquiry.

A foreign ministers meeting between France, Germany, the UK, and the US had been postponed, and a ministerial meeting between Australia, France, and India was cancelled. France however, contacted India to talk about strengthening their cooperation in the Indo-Pacific. France's foreign commerce minister declined a meeting with his Australian counterpart.

French president Macron said that Europe needs to stop being naïve when it comes to defending its interests and build its own military capacity.

Following the ousting of Scott Morrison's government after the 2022 Australian federal election, the new Labor government led by Prime Minister Anthony Albanese agreed to a €555 million (US$584 million) settlement with French defence contractor Naval Group. In response, French defence minister Lecornu said that France aims to rebuild its relationship with Australia. In addition, Albanese announced plans to travel to France to reset bilateral relations between the two countries.

The exclusion of France from AUKUS has been conceptualised within the longue durée of the fractious relationship between France and the Anglosphere, potentially reducing scope for coordination in the Indo-Pacific in the short term.

=== China ===
The People's Republic of China (PRC)'s foreign affairs department spokesperson Zhao Lijian said, "The nuclear submarine cooperation between the US, the UK, and Australia has seriously undermined regional peace and stability, intensified the arms race and undermined international non-proliferation efforts". Zhao also said "The three countries should discard the Cold War zero-sum mentality and narrow geopolitical perspective". Spokesperson Hua Chunying said "China is firmly opposed to the US, the UK and Australia's malicious exploitation of loopholes in the Nuclear non-proliferation treaty and the International Atomic Energy Agency safeguards mechanism".

The Chinese Communist Party-owned tabloid Global Times, which is known for being more aggressive than official government statements, denounced Australia and said it had "turned itself into an adversary of China" and warned that Australia could be targeted by China as a warning to other countries if it acted "with bravado" in alliance with the US, or by being "militarily assertive". It further told Australia to avoid "provocation" or else China would "certainly punish it with no mercy", and concluded "Thus, Australian troops are also most likely to be the first batch of western soldiers to waste their lives in the South China Sea".

A Chinese Communist Party official, Victor Gao — former interpreter for Deng Xiaoping and vice president of a Beijing think tank, the Center for China and Globalization — considered the move to be a violation of international law and warned that Australia's moves towards nuclear-powered submarines would lead to the country "being targeted with nuclear weapons", in a future nuclear war.

The PRC ambassador to France Lu Shaye urged the new alliance to fulfill their nuclear non proliferation obligations and said Asia-Pacific needs jobs, not submarines, and urged France to boost cooperation.

=== Indonesia ===
The Ministry of Foreign Affairs expressed concerns about the implications of the Australian acquisition of nuclear-powered submarines for "the continuing arms race and power projection in the region". It called on Canberra to maintain its commitment to regional peace and stability. Foreign Minister Retno Marsudi stated the situation "would certainly not benefit anyone" and that "efforts to maintain a peaceful and stable region must continue". Indonesia later cancelled a planned visit by Australian Prime Minister Scott Morrison amid the fallout of the AUKUS deal. On 22 September 2021, the Commission I of the People's Representative Council urged President Joko Widodo to take a strong stand over the AUKUS deal through the auspices of ASEAN. Commission I member Rizki Aulia Rahman described the formation of AUKUS as a threat to Indonesian national defence and sovereignty. The Foreign Ministry responded that they were working on a response to the issues posed by AUKUS.

The Minister of Defence Prabowo Subianto at the Manama Dialogue in November 2021 said that Indonesian's position is that Southeast Asia should be nuclear-free and that Southeast Asian nations fear that AUKUS could spark an arms race. He also said that he understands and respects the formation of AUKUS to enable nations to protect themselves if they feel threatened. In November 2023, Prabowo said that he considered the formation of AUKUS by Australia, the US and the UK as a sovereign right.

=== Other countries ===
- Canada – The deal was announced in the midst of the 2021 Canadian federal election. Opposition politicians quickly attacked Prime Minister Justin Trudeau over Canada's exclusion from the partnership, to which Trudeau responded by stating that "This is a deal for nuclear submarines, which Canada is not currently or any time soon in the market for. Australia is." Leader of the Official Opposition Erin O'Toole stated that he would seek to join the alliance if elected. In March 2026, Canadian Defence Minister David McGuinty said Canada was "unlikely" to join AUKUS.
- Denmark – Prime Minister Mette Frederiksen said that Joe Biden is "very loyal" to Europe and that "we should not turn... challenges, which will always exist between allies, into something they should not be." The Prime Minister also said she did not understand the criticism coming from Paris and Brussels.
- Fiji – The day after both Indonesia and Malaysia aired concerns at the sweeping plan, Albanese met Fijian counterpart Sitiveni Rabuka to assure him the pact would help ensure regional stability. In a briefing later, a senior member of the Australian government said the message from the Fijian leader was that he supported the AUKUS agreement and Fiji's ties with its traditional security partners. In March 2023 Rabuka met Albanese during his brief stop in Fiji on his way back from San Diego. Rabuka told reporters travelling with Albanese in Fiji that he backed AUKUS, and that Albanese had assured him Australia's submarine push would not undermine the Treaty of Rarotonga, which declares that the South Pacific is a nuclear weapons-free zone.
- Germany– Minister of State for Europe Michael Roth described the row as a "wake up call" and stated that the EU must speak with one voice and that rebuilding lost trust will not be easy.
- Kiribati – President Taneti Maamau said that the deal puts the region at risk and that he was not consulted in relation to it. In the past the UK and US tested nuclear weapons in Kiribati, so they are concerned about nuclear submarines being developed. Kiribati recently switched diplomatic recognition from Taiwan to the China mainland. Beijing told Kiribati it is listening, whereas they felt that Australia is not listening to them. Mr Maamau said he is looking to Australia to show leadership as it debates a commitment to net zero emissions by 2050. Mr Maamuu also stated he was surprised at the absence of "courtesy" Australia displayed in not discussing the proposed agreement with its Pacific "neighbours".
- Malaysia – Prime Minister Ismail Sabri Yaakob said he had raised concerns about the project with Mr. Morrison, and warned that the nuclear submarine project might heighten military tensions in Asia. He urged all parties to avoid any provocation, as well as an arms race in the region. "At the same time, it will provoke other powers to take more aggressive action in this region, especially in the South China Sea," Mr Yaakob said. Ismail Sabri also stressed the importance of respecting and adhering to Malaysia's existing stance and approach to nuclear-powered submarines operating in Malaysian waters, including under the United Nations Convention on the Law of the Sea and the Southeast Asian Nuclear-Weapon-Free Zone Treaty. After a meeting with Indonesia's Foreign Minister, Malaysian Foreign Minister Saifuddin Abdullah stated, "Although [Australia] stated that these are nuclear-powered summaries and not nuclear-armed ones, both our governments expressed concern and disturbance." Australia has since dispatched officials to Kuala Lumpur to clarify about the deal. Abdullah agreed to the suggestion of Australian Minister of Foreign Affairs, Marise Payne, for an in-depth briefing over the matter. In response to the announcement of the agreement Malaysia's defence Minister proposed an immediate working trip to China to discuss AUKUS, as they wanted to get views of AUKUS from China's Leadership.
- New Zealand – On 16 September 2021, Prime Minister Jacinda Ardern issued a statement reiterating New Zealand's stance that no nuclear submarines were permitted in its waters, while also stating that they were not approached about the partnership and that she would not have expected them to have been approached. Ardern said the leaders of the three member states were "very well versed" in New Zealand's nuclear-free policy and would have "understood our likely position on the establishment of nuclear-powered submarines". Notably, Ardern was the first foreign politician that Morrison informed prior to the public announcement. Judith Collins, the leader of the National Party, expressed disappointment that New Zealand was not approached to join the partnership for the non-submarine co-operation areas.
- Democratic People's Republic of Korea (North Korea) – The Foreign Ministry issued a statement condemning the deal as "extremely undesirable and dangerous" which would "upset the strategic balance in the Asia-Pacific region", potentially destroying the nuclear non-proliferation system, and criticising the "double-dealing" of the US which "seriously threatens the world peace and stability" stating that North Korea will take counteraction if the alliance threatens the country.
- Papua New Guinea — The Prime Minister stated that he wanted to protect the "peace and serenity" of the region and that "as far as securing peace is concerned, we've got no problem, but if such activities bring disharmony in the region then we have an issue".
- Philippines – Through a statement released by the Department of Foreign Affairs, the Philippines welcomed the signing of the trilateral security partnership. Foreign Secretary Teodoro Locsin Jr. highlighted that "the enhancement of a near-abroad ally's ability to project power should restore and keep the balance rather than destabilise it", Secretary Locsin further added that without an actual presence of nuclear weapons within the region, the Philippines therefore finds that the AUKUS move would not constitute a violation of the 1995 Southeast Asian Nuclear-Weapon-Free Zone Treaty.
- Portugal – Minister Augusto Santos Silva said "In general, we ourselves express our solidarity with France, which has not been treated with due respect in this process", adding that "clearly, the form was not one that should have been followed".
- Russia – Deputy foreign minister Sergei Ryabkov expressed concern, stating "This is a great challenge to the international nuclear non-proliferation regime." and that "We are also concerned about the ... partnership that will allow Australia, after 18 months of consultations and several years of attempts, to obtain nuclear-powered submarines in sufficient numbers to become one of the top five countries for this type of armaments."
- Singapore – Prime Minister Lee Hsien Loong welcomed Australia's assurance that its new defence partnership with the US and the UK aims to promote a "stable and secure" Asia Pacific amid China's concerns.
- Solomon Islands— Prime minister Manasseh Sogavare said that he wanted to keep the region "nuclear free" and that he opposed "any form of militarisation in our region that could threaten regional and international peace and stability".
- Taiwan – Vice President Lai Ching-te, immediately welcomed the partnership, referring to it "as a positive development for democracy, peace, and prosperity in the region". The foreign affairs spokesperson said, "Taiwan, on the groundwork of the Taiwan Relations Act and the Six Guarantees, will continue to deepen the close partnership with the United States, maintain the rules-based international order, and the peace, stability, and prosperity in the Taiwan Strait and in the Indo-Pacific region together." Taiwan's Foreign Minister Joseph Wu also welcomed the partnership, stating "We are pleased to see that the like-minded partners of Taiwan — the United States and the UK and Australia — are working closer with each other to acquire more advanced defence articles so that we can defend Indo-Pacific".
- Others – Morrison said he contacted prime ministers Yoshihide Suga of Japan, Narendra Modi of India, and Lee Hsien Loong of Singapore. South Korea has also remained silent.

=== European Union ===
President of the European Commission Ursula von der Leyen told CNN that "one of our member states has been treated in a way that is not acceptable. ... We want to know what happened and why." The EU also demanded an apology from Australia. President of the European Council Charles Michel denounced a "lack of transparency and loyalty" by the US. The EU said the crisis affects the whole union.

Preparations for a new EU-US trade and technology council between the US and EU were postponed. France eventually dropped their opposition to these talks which took place in Pittsburgh on 29 September 2021. France also attempted to delay the free trade talks between the EU and Australia. Apparently "most of Europe felt that transatlantic ties were too important to sacrifice to French pique"; such as the pro-free trade Northern Europe countries, as well as Eastern European nations that prioritize security ties with Washington, who "resented the French attempt to impose its indignation on the rest of the bloc". Key advocates for the TTC talks included EU's digital chief Margrethe Vestager, who favors open markets, and EU trade chief Valdis Dombrovskis from Latvia, who views the US alliance and NATO as a vital counterweight to Russia and China. Lithuanian deputy European Affairs Minister Arnoldas Prankevicius proclaimed "What is important is to keep trans-Atlantic unity, because we believe this is our biggest strength and biggest value, especially vis-à-vis such countries as Russia and China".

== Summits ==
	Date	Host	Location	Leaders	Ref.
1	15 September 2021	United States	Virtual meeting (Video conference)	(Australia) Scott Morrison; (United Kingdom) Boris Johnson; (United States) Joe Biden	
2	13 March 2023	United States	San Diego	(Australia) Anthony Albanese; (United Kingdom) Rishi Sunak; (United States) Joe Biden	

== See also ==
- Allied technological cooperation during World War II
- Anglosphere
- ANZUS – 1951 Australia, New Zealand, the United States Security Treaty
- AUSCANNZUKUS
- ABCANZ Armies
- Five Eyes
- Five Power Defence Arrangements (FPDA) – Defence cooperation among Australia, Malaysia, New Zealand, Singapore and UK
- Free and Open Indo-Pacific (FOIP)
- Foreign policy of Xi Jinping
- Quadrilateral Security Dialogue (Quad) – Strategic dialogue among Australia, India, Japan and the US
- Reciprocal Access Agreement – Bilateral defense and security pacts with Japan
- Southeast Asia Treaty Organization (SEATO)
- Tizard Mission
- UKUSA Agreement – Multilateral signals intelligence treaty signed in 1946
- US–UK Mutual Defence Agreement
- United States foreign policy toward the People's Republic of China
