= Philip Revzin =

American writer

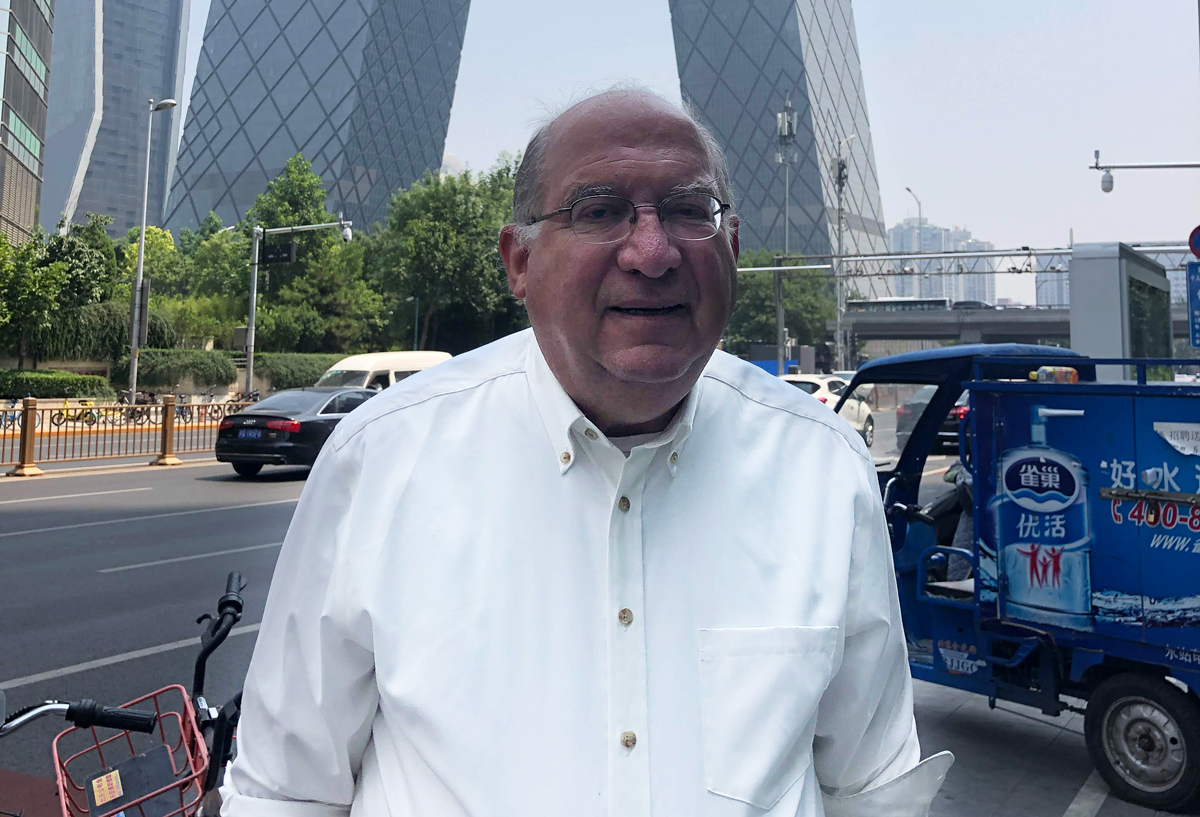
- Born: 1952 (age 73–74)
- Education: Stanford University (B.A.); Columbia University (M.A.)
- Occupations: Writer and Newspaper Editor
- Notable work: Just One Before I Die A Cubs Fan’s Chronicle of a Championship Season, Various newspaper articles

Philip Revzin (born 1952) is a freelance writer as well as former publisher and head editor for The Wall Street Journal Europe and The Wall Street Journal Asia. Philip grew up in Chicago, and first started at The Wall Street Journal as a newspaper summer intern reporting while attending Stanford University in 1972. He worked as a reporter and editor for the Wall Street Journal for 31 years in various locations including New York, London, Paris, and Brussels. While at the Journal he interviewed world leaders including Margaret Thatcher, Francois Mitterrand, Jacques Chirac, and Lee Kwan Yew. After departing the Wall Street Journal he worked in book publishing with St. Martin's Press as a senior editor as well as an editor for Bloomberg News. In 2016 at the age of 64 he wrote and published his first book, Just One Before I Die A Cubs Fan’s Chronicle of a Championship Season. The book covers the Chicago Cubs' 2016 World Series winning season. Philip currently works as a freelance writer.
