= Chunyuan Liao =

Founder and CEO of HiScene

Chunyuan Liao is the founder and CEO of HiScene, a Chinese image recognition and augmented reality technology provider he began in 2012. Liao is part of the Chinese government's "Thousand Talents Plan".

== Education ==
Liao received his B.S. and Ph.D. degrees from Tsinghua University, China, and the University of Maryland, respectively.

== Career ==
Before founding HiScene, Liao was a research scientist at Fuji Xerox Palo Alto Laboratory in Silicon Valley, California.
