= Semafor (website) =

American news website

- Website type: News
- Available in: English
- Founders: Ben Smith, Justin B. Smith
- CEO: Justin B. Smith
- Website: www.semafor.com
- Launched: October 18, 2022; 4 years ago
- Current status: Active

Semafor is an American company operating a news website and publishing newsletters. It was founded in 2022 by Ben Smith, a former editor-in-chief of BuzzFeed News and media columnist at The New York Times, and Justin B. Smith, the former CEO of Bloomberg Media Group. Semafor covers business, technology, politics, global issues, as well as other subjects. As of 2026, Semafor is valued at $330 million after recording its first profitable year in 2025. Semafor's advisory board includes Microsoft CEO Satya Nadella, Nvidia founder Jensen Huang, Anthropic President Daniela Amodei, and LinkedIn co-founder Reid Hoffman.

== Description and etymology ==
Vox has described Semafor as "a collection of newsletters, plus a website, aimed at an upscale audience that understands topics like Washington politics and Silicon Valley tech but wants more". The website is free to access and supported by advertisements, though Semafor's co-founders have described plans to convert to a paid subscription model. The organization is based in New York City.

The name "Semafor" is derived from the word "semaphore", which "appears in similar form in many languages". According to The New York Times, "semaphore" is "often used in a nautical context" and can be described as "a visual signaling apparatus often involving flags, lights and arm gestures". The co-founders appreciated that the word "sounds about the same in thirty-five languages".

== History ==
=== Founding ===
Semafor was launched by journalist Ben Smith, who was previously a media columnist for The New York Times, and Justin B. Smith (no relation), the chief executive officer of Bloomberg Media Group, in October 2022. The duo had met in Manhattan in 2008 and kept in touch; at a conference in Davos in 2018, they began a series of discussions that led to the development of Semafor over four years. Ahead of the launch, both men resigned from their previous positions in January 2022. A federal trademark registration for Semafor was filed on January 16, and the Smiths announced the organization's name in March 2022. In a memo Justin Smith sent to "close confidants", he described a new company that would "reimagine quality global journalism" aimed at what he said was an "English-speaking, college-educated, professional class" that had "lost trust in all sources of news and information". Semafor launched on October 18, 2022, with Gina Chua as executive editor.

=== Expansion ===
Leading up to the launch, Semafor advertised heavily on Twitter. Semafor and Twitter also launched a video distribution partnership. Semafor partnered with Gallup for data, and uses office space in the analytics company's headquarters in Washington, D.C. In addition to offices in New York City and Washington, D.C., Semafor has a presence in London and Africa. There are plans to expand to Asia, other parts of Europe, and Latin America. Semafor has an equity program that shares profits with employees.

In December 2023, Ozy Media sued Semafor, Buzzfeed, and Ben Smith for allegedly stealing trade secrets.

In July 2024, Semafor launched a Middle East vertical, adding another world region to its existing coverage of the United States and sub-Saharan Africa. In December 2024, Semafor launched Semafor Gulf, with Mohammed Sergie (previously with Bloomberg News and the Council on Foreign Relations) as editor.

=== Funding ===
Operations were initially supported by $25 million in investment funding, as well as revenue generated from advertising and in-person events. Investors have included Sam Bankman-Fried, David G. Bradley, Jorge Paulo Lemann, and Jessica Lessin. Genesis Motor/Hyundai Motor Company, Mastercard, Pfizer, Qualcomm, the Indian multinational conglomerate Tata Group, and Verizon were among ten founding launch partners. Other advertisers and sponsors included Cisco and Alibaba Group. In December 2022, Semafor Climate Editor Bill Spindle left the company after unsuccessfully trying to remove adverts from Chevron next to articles about climate change, criticizing Semafor's "Over-Dependence on Chevron Advertising". Semafor said the advertising did not influence its coverage. Dylan Byers of Puck News wrote in 2025 that Semafor has "morphed into an events business oriented almost entirely around sponsorship deals."

In 2023, Semafor announced plans to repurchase Bankman-Fried's investment following the bankruptcy of FTX. Semafor's co-founder Justin Smith stated that Bankman-Fried had received "no actual shares" in Semafor due to the company's dual-class share structure and that neither he nor any other investors influence editorial coverage or operations. Although Bankman-Fried was Semafor's largest external investor, he would only have received a small minority stake if he had converted his investment to equity. In May 2023, Semafor raised $19 million in additional funding from investors to replace the money received from Bankman-Fried.

Semafor has received criticism for its relationship with individuals and companies tied to the Chinese Communist Party. In January 2023, Voice of America reported that Semafor received sponsorship funding from Chinese e-commerce giant Alibaba Group.

In January 2026, Semafor raised $30 million in a new funding round, with plans to expand its events business and hire additional journalists. The financing valued the company at $330 million after its first profitable year in 2025.

=== Staff ===
Co-founders Justin B. Smith and Ben Smith are the chief executive officer and editor-in-chief, respectively. Gina Chua was announced as the executive editor in March 2022. Rachel Oppenheim was hired as the chief revenue officer, Kellen Henry as the head of product, and Al Lucca as the head of design.

Semafor launched with approximately 60 employees—at least half of whom were reporters. Initial hires included Reed Albergotti of The Washington Post, Liz Hoffman of The Wall Street Journal, and Max Tani of Politico, who would focus on technology, business and finance, and media, respectively. In his role as editor-at-large, Steven Clemons, also formerly of The Wall Street Journal, was hired to oversee live journalism operations, moderate on-stage interviews, and write a newsletter about American politics and policy. David Weigel writes a newsletter called Americana.

Benjy Sarlin is chief of the Washington, D.C., bureau. Nigerian editor Yinka Adegoke leads Semafor Africa, the organization's first international edition. Alexis Akwagyiram joined as managing editor from the Financial Times.

== Content ==
Semafor's articles and newsletters are structured into short sections, each with a separate subtitle. The first section generally consists of a short summary of the relevant facts, followed by "The Reporter's View", a section containing analysis or an editorial by the writer of the article. Other common sections include "The View From", which describes perspectives from countries or parties involved in the story, and "Room for Disagreement", which explores why the writer's analysis may be wrong. The structure, which Semafor calls "Semaform", is intended to clearly separate fact from opinion.

Semafor publishes a daily newsletter entitled Flagship that covers world news, as well as distinct newsletters focusing on Africa, U.S. politics and policy, business and finance, climate, international security, media, and technology. Each newsletter contains a regular feature called "One Good Text" in which journalists conduct one-question interviews with politicians, business executives, and other notable individuals via text message.

== Events ==
Events are a significant part of Semafor's operations: 30% of its revenue in 2022, its first year of operation, was generated by events. In 2025, events accounted for more than half of its revenue. Co-founder Justin B. Smith noted that part of the motivation for dedicating a large portion of operations to events was that traditional sources of revenue, such as subscriptions and advertising, take a long time to cultivate, while events provide an immediate source of income for a news startup. Even before launching, Semafor had already held 12 events, including one in July 2022 with Tucker Carlson and Taylor Lorenz that focused on polarization and trust within the news industry, and another in November 2022 called "Media, Government, and a Healthy Democracy" with Karine Jean-Pierre and Anthony Scaramucci.

Semafor also hosted several live journalism event series. In December 2022, it hosted an event focusing on Africa to coincide with that year's U.S.–Africa Leaders Summit in Washington, D.C. The event featured interviews with Rwandan president Paul Kagame, U.S. trade representative Katherine Tai, and Qin Gang, China's ambassador to the U.S. Subsequent events included a "media summit" in April 2023 in New York City with Barry Diller, Chris Licht, Jen Psaki, Stephen A. Smith, and Kara Swisher, and a "World Economy Summit" in Washington, D.C., in April 2023 with National Economic Council director Lael Brainard and Microsoft president Brad Smith.

== China ==
In March 2023, Semafor launched its "China and Global Business Initiative", a collaboration with the Center for China and Globalization (CCG), a think tank registered as a non-governmental organization (though its independence from the Chinese Communist Party has been disputed). The initiative consists of regular events in New York City and Beijing, and would foster dialogue between business leaders amid increasing China–U.S. tensions.

That same year, Semafor's partnership with the CCG came under scrutiny by Axios and other news outlets. Semafor CEO Justin Smith said Semafor would go into the collaboration with its "eyes wide open" and that it was under "[no] illusion that Chinese business leaders or other local groups operate independently of the Chinese Communist Party." Smith also said Semafor would retain editorial independence and full ownership of the project.

The project's advisory board contains both U.S. and Chinese business leaders and academics, such as Robin Zeng—the chairman of Contemporary Amperex Technology Co., Limited and a member of the Chinese People's Political Consultative Conference—and Wang Huiyao, founder and President of CCG. Other advisors include Chen Deming, a former Minister of Commerce; Cui Tiankai, a former Chinese ambassador to the U.S.; and Zhou Xiaochuan, a former governor of People's Bank of China. U.S. board members include Jessica Chen Weiss, a professor at Cornell University and former senior advisor to the United States Department of State's Policy Planning Staff; Jerry Yang, co-founder of Yahoo!; Susan Thornton, former acting Assistant Secretary of State for East Asian and Pacific Affairs; Rana Mitter, S.T. Lee Chair in U.S.–Asia Relations at the Harvard Kennedy School; John L. Thornton, former co-president of Goldman Sachs; and David Rubenstein, a philanthropist, investor, and former Deputy Assistant to the President for domestic policy.
