= Beijing Overseas Talent Aggregation Project =

Beijing Overseas Talent Aggregation Project (abbreviated as BOTAP, Chinese: 北京海外人才聚集工程), or Haiju Project (Chinese: 海聚工程), is a talent program implemented in Beijing. It was initiated in 2019 by the Opinions on the Implementation of Beijing Overseas Talent Aggregation Project issued by the Beijing Municipal Committee of the Chinese Communist Party and three policy documents, Interim Measures of Beijing Municipality to Encourage Overseas High-level Talents to Come to Beijing for Entrepreneurship and Work and Interim Measures of Beijing Municipality to Promote Overseas Educated Personnel to Come to Beijing for Entrepreneurship and Work, both of which were released by Beijing Municipal Government.

== History ==
It is planned to introduce all kinds of talents from overseas, gather 10 R&D teams led by strategic scientists, 50 or so high-tech entrepreneurial teams led by scientific and technological leaders, introduce and support about 200 overseas high-level talents in innovation and entrepreneurship, and establish 10 innovation and entrepreneurship bases for overseas high-level talents in a period of 5 to 10 years starting from 2009. The main bodies that can apply for the BOTAP Project are Beijing key innovation projects, key disciplines and key laboratories, municipal colleges and universities, scientific research institutes, hospitals, state-owned enterprises and commercial financial institutions, as well as high-tech industrial development zones such as Zhongguancun Science and Technology Park and Beijing Economic-Technological Development Zone.

The BOTAP Project also has a youth program to introduce young high-level talents from overseas.

== See also ==
- Thousand Talents Plan
