= Victor Gao =

Chinese scholar (born 1962)

- 高志凯
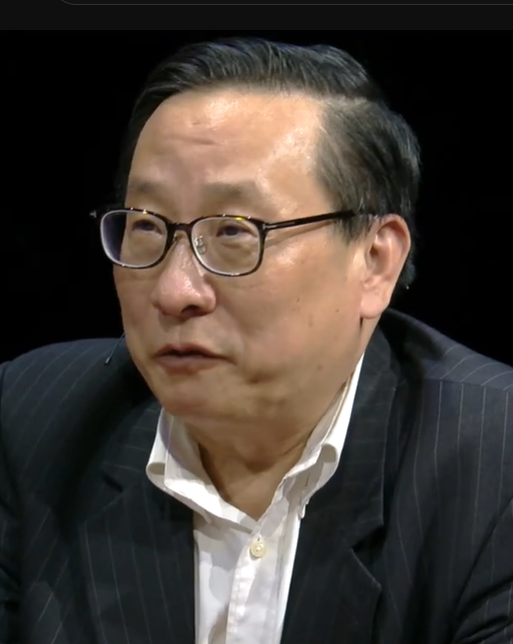
- Gao in 2024
- Born: Gao Zhikai; 1962 (age 63–64); Suzhou, Jiangsu, China
- Education: Soochow University (BA); Beijing Foreign Studies University (MA); Yale University (MA, JD)
- Occupations: Lawyer; legal scholar; academic
- Organization: Center for China and Globalization
- Political party: Revolutionary Committee of the Chinese Kuomintang

Victor Zhikai Gao (Note: Chinese: 高志凯; pinyin: Gāo Zhìkǎi) (born 1962) is a Chinese lawyer, businessman, and academic who is the vice president of the Beijing-based Center for China and Globalization (CCG).

Gao is an expert on international relations at Soochow University, where he is a Chair Professor. Gao is also a member of the Beijing Municipal Committee of the Revolutionary Committee of the Chinese Kuomintang, a minor and non-oppositional political party led by the Chinese Communist Party. He was formerly an interpreter for Chinese head of state Deng Xiaoping.

== Early life and education ==
Gao was raised in rural China during the 1970s. He attended high school in Southern China. When Chinese Communist Party leader Deng Xiaoping reopened universities during the reform and opening up, Gao convinced local authorities to allow him to take the Gaokao for college admission in 1977 before he had graduated high school.

Gao received a Bachelor of Arts (B.A.) in English language and literature from Soochow University in 1981, then earned a Master of Arts (M.A.) in English language and literature from Beijing University of Foreign Studies in 1983. He pursued graduate studies in the United States at Yale University, where he graduated with a master's degree in political science in 1990 and then a Juris Doctor (J.D.) from Yale Law School in 1993. He was admitted to the New York State Bar Association in 1994.

== Career ==
From 1983 to 1988, Gao was a translator for Deng Xiaoping. He was also a member of the Ministry of Foreign Affairs from 1983 to 1989 at the United Nations Secretariat in New York. After leaving the Ministry of Foreign Affairs in 1988, Gao was recommended by Henry Kissinger to study at Yale University, where he earned a Juris Doctor degree from Yale Law School in 1993. Then he was a policy adviser for the Hong Kong Securities and Futures Commission from 1999 to 2000.

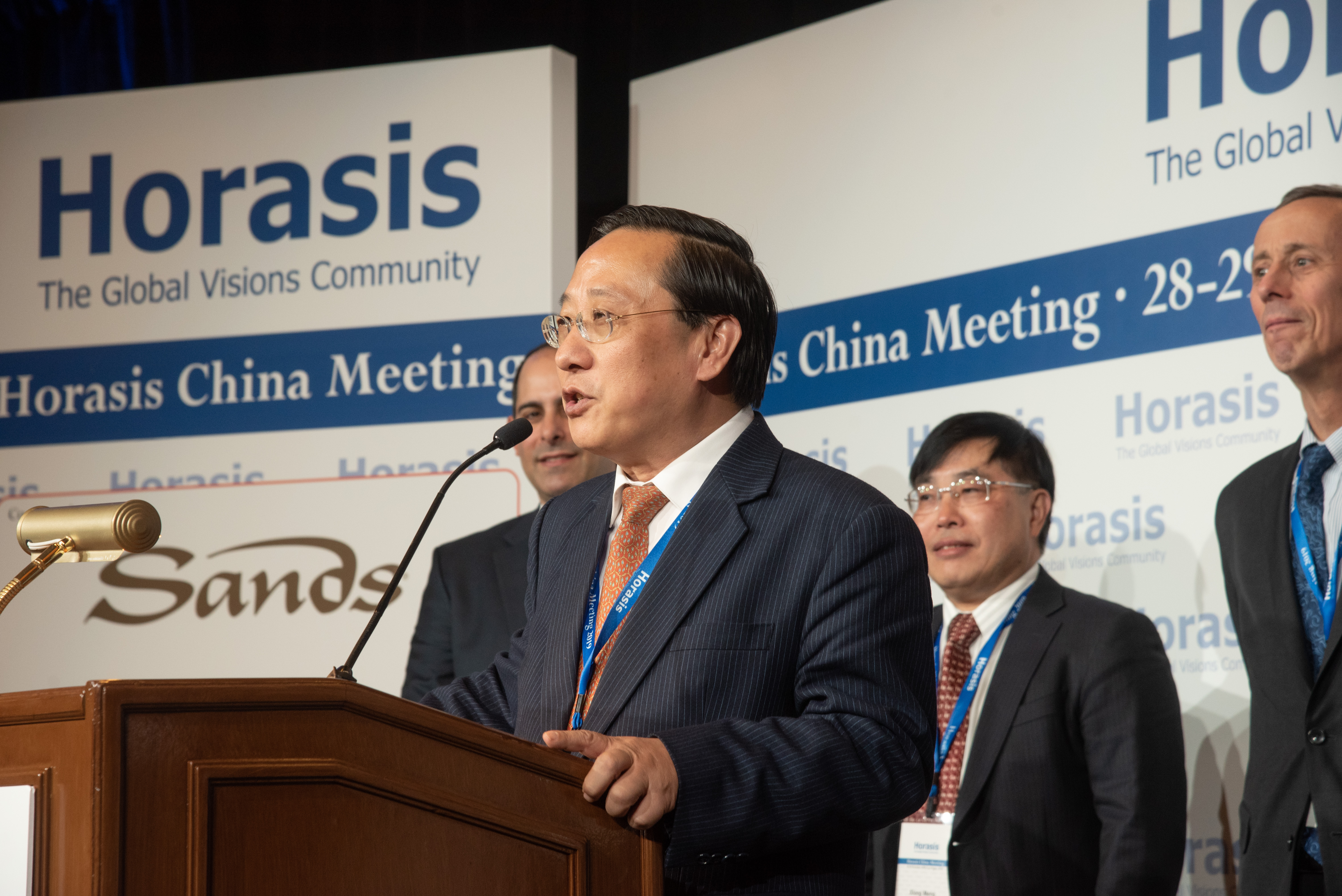
Gao speaking at the Horasis Global China Business Meeting 2019

Gao has been an investment banker for Morgan Stanley. He is a director of the China National Association of International Studies and an executive director of Beijing Private Equity Association. Gao is the vice president of the Center for China and Globalization.

According to Foreign Policy, "Gao was once treated as a reputable interlocutor in U.S.–China relations."

== Views ==
=== Hong Kong ===
In 2014, Gao condemned pro-democracy protests in Hong Kong as illegal and provocative. He supports the 2020 Hong Kong National Security Law.

=== AUKUS ===
In September 2021, Gao referred to the AUKUS pact as a "gross violation of international law," claimed that "Armed with nuclear submarines, Australia itself will be a target for possible nuclear attacks in the future," and referred to Australians as "brainless." He also warned that Australia's moves towards nuclear-powered submarines would lead to the country "being targeted with nuclear weapons," in a future nuclear war. Gao repeated his warning to Australia during an interview on 60 Minutes Australia television programme in November 2021: "I would say the AUKUS deal in itself by enabling Australia to build nuclear submarines will have one big consequence for Australia, that is, Australia will no longer enjoy the benefit and the very rare privilege of not being targeted with nuclear weapons going forward."

The interviewer challenged Gao by reminding him that Australia was planning to buy nuclear-powered submarines and not nuclear-armed submarines, and asked: "Why should Australia then be a target of nuclear weapons?" Dismissing the distinction, Gao insisted: "Listen to me: the tubes in the submarine can be armed with both nuclear warheads and conventional warheads. Now, in the heat of a battle or in the heat of a war, do you think Australia will allow inspections as to what kind of warhead you put into that big tube? I can bet you, in the heat of battle no one will pause – and the safe approach is to target Australia as a nuclear-armed country.

=== Taiwan ===
Gao supports "any means possible" to achieve Chinese unification.

In October 2021, Gao claimed that Taiwanese of Japanese descent supported Taiwanese independence, and that after a PRC take over they should either demonstrate support for reunification in writing or emigrate. Foreign Policy magazine considered this to be a call for ethnic cleansing.

In August 2022, Gao argued that the "Chinese military's mission is to liberate Taiwan."

In July 2025, Gao advocated for a "second Xi'an Incident" that would involve the kidnapping of Taiwanese President Lai Ching-te as part of a plan for military annexation of Taiwan.

=== COVID-19 ===
Gao believes that any search for the origins of the COVID-19 virus in China are part of "a conspiracy" because it "existed earlier than the outbreak of Wuhan in other parts of the world, including, most logically, in the United States, centering on Fort Detrick."

=== Peng Shuai ===
In February 2022, Gao claimed on the 60 Minutes Australia program that the Chinese tennis player Peng Shuai could not have been raped by a CCP official because of her physical athleticism as a professional athlete and said that "she can defend herself in front of whatever man or person in China".

=== Other ===
Gao opposes Scottish Independence and criticised the UK for allowing the 2014 Scottish independence referendum to happen at all.

In June 2021, Gao said that "The G7 and NATO have been distorted into anti-China platforms."

Gao believes that the enlargement of NATO and potential missile defense system emplacements were the cause of the Russian invasion of Ukraine. According to the South China Morning Post, "He said the same scenario could occur between England and Scotland, if a country like Russia wanted to deploy nuclear weapons on Scottish territory." He has claimed that Ukraine joining NATO would "trigger armageddon." In February 2023, Time magazine reported that Gao had believed that the Russian invasion of Ukraine would likely end in an armistice, with Ukraine not being able to win back all of its territories, and that both sides would be "shelving the disputes for future generations to resolve".

In May 2025, following the 2025 India–Pakistan conflict and India's suspension of the Indus Waters Treaty, Gao has commented on the importance of upholding international river treaties such as the Indus Waters Treaty. He warned against using water as a geopolitical weapon and encouraged cooperation between China, India, and Pakistan over the Brahmaputra and Indus rivers.

In June 2025, Gao suggested that China's border with India should be drawn at the Ganga (Ganges) River, to rebut the so-called McMahon Line that was drawn without any basis. This comment, quickly dubbed the "Victor Gao Line", implied that all territory north of the river, including Delhi and the Indo-Gangetic plains, could be claimed by China. The statement sparked widespread reactions online and in diplomatic circles.
