= Sheila Coronel =

Filipino investigative journalist

Sheila S. Coronel is a Philippines-born investigative journalist and journalism professor. She is one of the founders of the Philippine Center for Investigative Journalism (PCIJ). In 2006, she was named the inaugural director of the Stabile Center for Investigative Journalism at Columbia University's Graduate School of Journalism. In 2014, she was appointed the School's Academic Dean, a position she held until the end of 2020.

== Biography ==
Coronel, the oldest of six children, was born to Antonio Coronel, a criminal defense attorney, and Dorotea Soto, an English teacher and entrepreneur. She graduated from the College of the Holy Spirit Manila and the University of the Philippines with a degree in political science. She became an activist in college and was nearly arrested during a military roundup in 1982. She earned a Master's degree in political sociology from the London School of Economics.

Coronel began her journalism career during the twilight of the dictatorship of Ferdinand Marcos. After the People Power Revolution that ousted Marcos, she worked as a political reporter for The Manila Times and The Manila Chronicle, and in 1989, became the first executive director of the Philippine Center for Investigative Journalism, one of the earliest nonprofit investigative centers to be formed globally. In a series of articles in 2001, the organization exposed corruption by then-President Joseph Estrada; the series sparked impeachment hearings in the Philippine Senate and a popular uprising that ousted the president.

In 2006 she joined the Columbia University Graduate School of Journalism in New York City. In 2014 she took over as academic dean of the journalism school. As of 2024 she is the Toni Stabile Professor of Professional Practice in Investigative Journalism and the director of the Toni Stabile Center for Investigative Journalism.

Coronel is board chair of the Media Development Investment Fund, which invests in independent media in countries with a history of media repression. She also sits on the boards of the Committee to Protect Journalists, the Columbia Journalism Review, and ProPublica. In addition, she is a member and former board chair of the International Consortium of Investigative Journalists.

Her recent work is on the populist Philippine President Rodrigo Duterte and police abuses in the war on drugs. She wrote about the link between police corruption and human rights abuses in the book, A Duterte Reader. In a 2019 article for The Atlantic, she and two Stabile Center fellows estimated that the casualties in Duterte's drug war were three times more than what the police claimed. As part of a series on populist autocrats published by Foreign Affairs, she traced Duterte's rise from the gun-toting mayor of Davao City to president. She has also written about populist threats to democracy and press freedom.

== Awards and honors ==
In early 1999, Coronel received the McLuhan Prize from the Canadian Embassy in Manila for her work as an investigative journalist. In 2001, she was named the Philippines' Best Print Journalist. After winning the Best Investigative Journalism Award four times in last 12 years, in 2001 she was included in the Hall of Fame list of Jaime V. Ongpin Awards for Investigative Journalism. In 2003, Coronel received the Magsaysay Award for Journalism, Literature and Creative Communication Arts. In 2011, she received one of Columbia's highest honors, the Presidential Teaching Award.

== Publications ==
Coronel is the author or editor of a number of books on investigative journalism and Philippine politics and society, including The Rulemakers: How the Wealthy and Well-Born Dominate Congress; Pork and Other Perks: Corruption and Governance in the Philippines; and Coups, Cults & Cannibals.

== Personal life ==
Coronel is the partner of Gina Chua, a journalist and trans woman. Her sister is Miriam Coronel-Ferrer, a Filipino peace negotiator.
