= The Wall Street Journal Asia =

Discontinued version of American newspaper

- Founded: 1976
- Ceased publication: October 9, 2017
- Headquarters: Hong Kong

The Wall Street Journal Asia, a version of The Wall Street Journal, was a newspaper that provided news and analysis of global business developments for an Asian audience. Formerly known as The Asian Wall Street Journal, it was founded in 1976 and was printed in nine Asian cities: Bangkok, Hong Kong, Jakarta, Kuala Lumpur, Manila, Seoul, Singapore, Taipei, and Tokyo. Average circulation for 2011 was 83,421. Its largest markets in order of importance were: Hong Kong, Singapore, the Philippines, Japan, Thailand, South Korea, Indonesia, Taiwan, Malaysia, China, India, and Vietnam. The final print edition of the newspaper was published on 9 October 2017.

The paper's main regional office was in Hong Kong, and its former editor, international, was Daniel Hertzberg. The first editor and publisher of the Asian Journal was Peter R. Kann, the former chairman and chief executive officer of Dow Jones & Company. Gina Chua served as editor-in-chief of the publication before her appointment as executive editor of Reuters. Philip Revzin also served as editor for the paper after serving as the editor and publisher for The Wall Street Journal Europe.

The Wall Street Journal Asia was also online at WSJ.com, the largest paid subscription news site on the web, and in Chinese at Chinese.wsj.com.

== Statistics ==
- Its readers were 77.9% Asian citizens, and 67.4% worked in top management.
- Its readership had an average annual income of US$229,000 and an average annual household income of US$301,000.

== See also ==
- The Wall Street Journal Europe
- Category:Lists of newspapers by country
