= Ben Smith (journalist) =

American political journalist (born 1976)

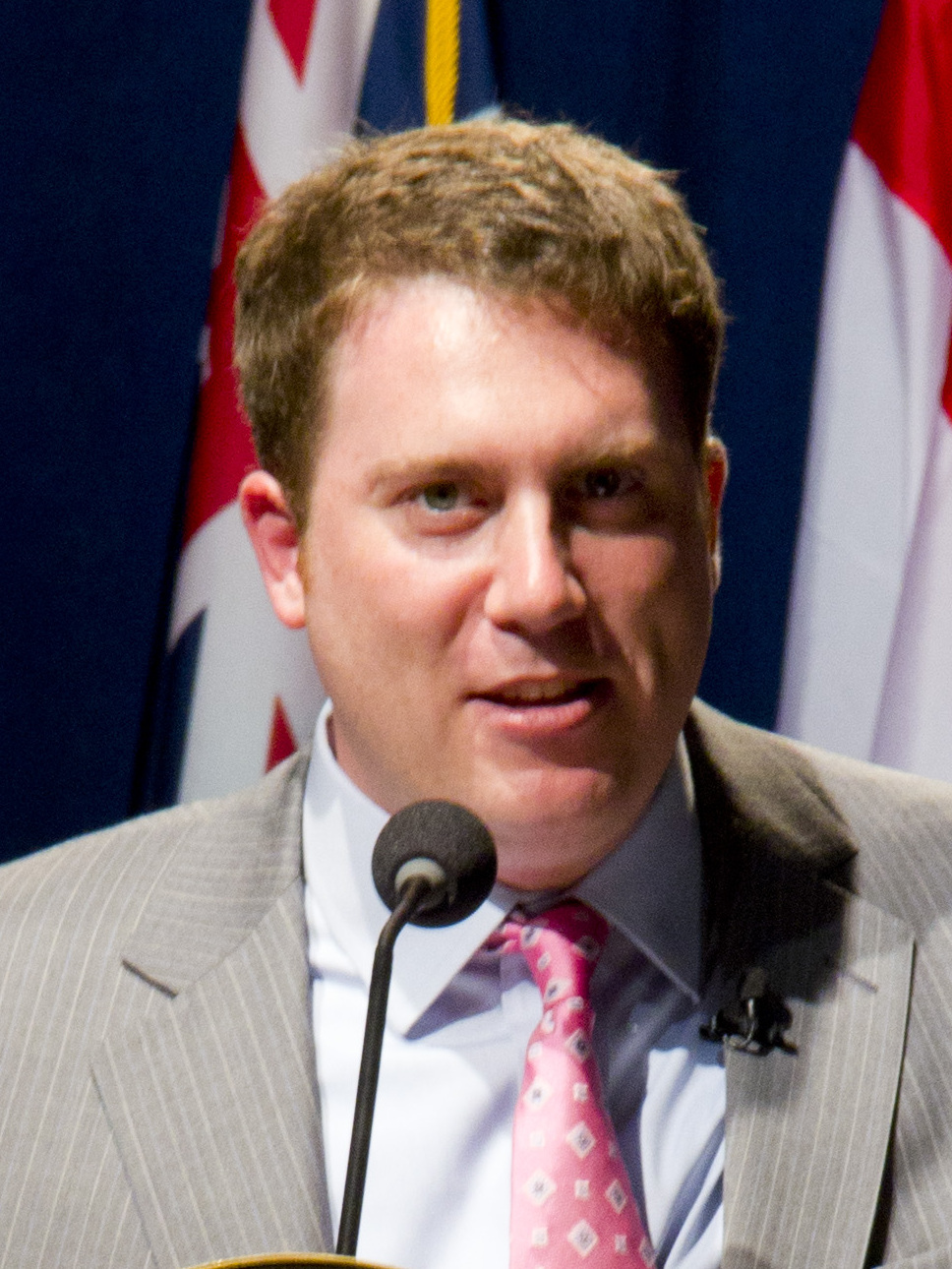
- Smith in 2012
- Born: Benjamin Eli Smith; November 4, 1976 (age 49); New York, New York, U.S.
- Education: Yale University (BA)
- Occupation: Journalist
- Years active: 1999–present
- Spouse: Liena Zagare (m. 2002)
- Children: 3
- Parents: Robert S. Smith (father); Dian Goldston Smith (mother)

Benjamin Eli Smith (November 4, 1976) is an American journalist who is the co-founder and editor-in-chief of Semafor, a news website he formed with Justin Smith in early 2022. He was previously a media columnist at The New York Times from 2020 to 2022. From 2011 to 2020, he was the editor-in-chief of BuzzFeed News.

== Early life and education ==
Benjamin Eli Smith was born and raised on the Upper West Side of Manhattan, the son of author Dian (née Goldston) and attorney Robert S. Smith, an associate judge on the New York Court of Appeals. His mother was Jewish and a Democrat. His father was a Christian and conservative. He admired his grandfather, a novelist who ghostwrote for Mickey Mantle and Tommy John, and his grandmother, a Mark Twain scholar. He attended Trinity School (New York City) on the Upper West Side. He graduated with a B.A. summa cum laude from Yale University in 1999, where he wrote for The Yale Herald and The New Journal magazine. He was a resident of Morse College. Smith first became interested in journalism during junior year of college as an intern at The Forward.

== Career ==
Smith's first professional reporting job was the crime beat for The Indianapolis Star. He then moved to Latvia to take a position at The Baltic Times and also began reporting for The Wall Street Journal Europe (until 2001). Smith has also written for The New York Sun (2002–2003), The New York Observer (2003–2006), and the New York Daily News (2006–2007). Between 2004 and 2006, Smith also started three New York City political blogs: The Politicker, The Daily Politics, and Room Eight.

=== Politico ===
Smith wrote for the news outlet Politico from 2008 to 2011, joining as that site expanded. Joining Politico from the New York Daily News in 2007, Smith covered the Democratic presidential primary for Politico in 2008. He covered controversies including Barack Obama's contacts with former Weatherman Bill Ayers and conspiracy theories about Obama's citizenship and Barack Obama religion conspiracy theories. Smith reported erroneously during that 2008 campaign that John Edwards would be dropping out of the race before the press conference at which Edwards announced that his wife Elizabeth had cancer. Smith later posted an apology and retracted the story. In 2010, he reported on a confidential Republican National Committee fundraising presentation counseling the party to capitalize on fear.

=== BuzzFeed News ===
In December 2011, he was named editor-in-chief of BuzzFeed News. Smith explained that he would be leaving his Politico blog but he would still write for the publication weekly. While working at BuzzFeed, Smith focused on strengthening the organization's investigative journalism unit.

Smith interviewed Barack Obama in early 2015 for BuzzFeed's first presidential interview.

In January 2017, Smith, as the editor of BuzzFeed News, published the Steele dossier, a 35-page dossier about Donald Trump, which major news organizations, including The New York Times and NBC News, refused to publish due to lack of credible evidence. Smith defended his decision by saying, "We have always erred on the side of publishing."

=== The New York Times ===
In January 2020, he was named media columnist for The New York Times, replacing Jim Rutenberg.

On May 17, 2020, Smith published an article titled "Is Ronan Farrow Too Good to Be True?" arguing that some of Farrow's journalism did not hold up to scrutiny. In response, Farrow said that he stood by his reporting. In a Slate piece, Ashley Feinberg described Smith's report as an "overcorrection for resistance journalism" and opined that his approach "[performed] broad-mindedness, sacrificing accuracy for some vague, centrist perception of fairness."

Smith reported in late September 2021 that Ozy, a media company, had attempted to deceive investors and advertisers. After Smith's media column appeared on September 26, the story led to a flurry of additional investigation and reporting by multiple sources including Smith, culminating in Ozy's board of directors announcing their intention to shut the company down on October 1. Slate and Fairness & Accuracy In Reporting (FAIR) each reported on the potential conflict of interest that Smith held an undisclosed amount of stock options in BuzzFeed, an Ozy competitor, during his investigation of Ozy. Vice reported that in a column for The New York Times about the NewsGuild union, Smith "doesn’t disclose that he worked against BuzzFeed staffers organizing with NewsGuild when he was in charge of the site’s news side, or that he has a financial interest in BuzzFeed, with which the union is currently negotiating."

=== Semafor ===
In early January 2022, Smith announced he would be leaving The New York Times to start a global news venture aimed at the 200 million college-educated English readers. Justin B. Smith would lead the business side of the new venture and Ben would be the top editor. The news site says it will break news and offer nuance to complex news stories. Justin Smith described a new company that would "reimagine quality global journalism" aimed at what he said was an "English-speaking, college-educated, professional class" that had "lost trust in all sources of news and information." The name of the new venture, Semafor, was announced in March 2022. Smith also writes a Washington-focused column for Semafor.

== Recognition ==
In 2012, Fast Company placed Smith on its "100 Most Creative" list.

In 2016, he and Buzzfeed co-founder Jonah Peretti were listed as two of the most powerful people in the media by The Hollywood Reporter.

In 2017, he and fellow Jewish journalist Andrea Mitchell were awarded The Jewish Daily Forward's Distinguished Journalism Award.

== Personal life ==
Smith married Latvian publisher Liena Zagare in 2002. He and Zagare have three children and live in Brooklyn.

== Works ==
- Traffic: Genius, Rivalry, and Delusion in the Billion-Dollar Race to Go Viral. Penguin Press, ISBN 978-0-593-29975-3

== See also ==
- New Yorkers in journalism
