= Munk Debates =

Semi-annual series of debates held in Toronto, Canada

The Munk Debates are a semi-annual series of debates on major policy issues held in Toronto, Ontario, Canada. They are run by the Aurea Foundation, a charitable foundation set up by Peter Munk, founder of mining company Barrick Gold, and his wife Melanie Munk. The debate series was founded in 2008 by Munk and Rudyard Griffiths, who moderates most of the debates.

The Munk debates are held in Toronto, at steadily larger venues as they have proven popular. Tickets are sold to the general public, and sell out shortly after being made available.

A poll is taken from the audience both before and after each debate. The winner of the debate is determined by how many people are persuaded to move from one opinion side to the other. The debates have been broadcast on CBC Radio's Ideas as well as CPAC. The more recent ones have also appeared on international broadcasters including BBC and C-SPAN.

== Debates ==
Date	Motion	Pro	Con	Winner	Swing	Venue
May 26, 2008	Be it resolved, the world is a safer place with a Republican in the White House.	Charles Krauthammer and Niall Ferguson	Samantha Power and Richard Holbrooke	Pro	17%	Royal Ontario Museum
Dec 1, 2008	Be it resolved, if countries like Sudan, Somalia and Burma will not end their man-made humanitarian crises, the international community should.	Gareth Evans and Mia Farrow	John Bolton and Rick Hillier	Con	9%	Royal Ontario Museum
June 1, 2009	Be it resolved, foreign aid does more harm than good.	Hernando de Soto Polar and Dambisa Moyo	Stephen Lewis and Paul Collier	Pro	2%	Royal Ontario Museum
Dec 1, 2009	Be it resolved, climate change is mankind's defining crisis, and demands a commensurate response.	George Monbiot and Elizabeth May	Bjørn Lomborg and Nigel Lawson	Con	8%	The Royal Conservatory of Music
June 7, 2010	Be it resolved, I would rather get sick in the United States than Canada.	Bill Frist and David Gratzer	Howard Dean and Robert Bell	Draw	0%	The Royal Conservatory of Music
Nov 26, 2010	Be it resolved, religion is a force for good in the world.	Tony Blair	Christopher Hitchens	Con	7%	Roy Thomson Hall
June 17, 2011	Be it resolved, the 21st century will belong to China.	Niall Ferguson and David Daokui Li	Henry Kissinger and Fareed Zakaria	Con	1%	Roy Thomson Hall
Nov 14, 2011	Be it resolved, North America faces a Japan-style era of high unemployment and slow growth.	Paul Krugman and David Rosenberg	Lawrence Summers and Ian Bremmer	Con	1%	Roy Thomson Hall
May 25, 2012	Be it resolved, the European experiment has failed.	Niall Ferguson and Josef Joffe	Daniel Cohn-Bendit and Peter Mandelson	Pro	1%	Roy Thomson Hall
November 26, 2012	Be it resolved, the world cannot tolerate an Iran with nuclear weapons capability.	Amos Yadlin and Charles Krauthammer	Fareed Zakaria and Vali Nasr	Con	2%	Roy Thomson Hall
May 30, 2013	Be it resolved, tax the rich (more).	George Papandreou and Paul Krugman	Newt Gingrich and Arthur Laffer	Pro	12%	Roy Thomson Hall
November 15, 2013	Be it resolved, men are obsolete.	Hanna Rosin and Maureen Dowd	Caitlin Moran and Camille Paglia	Pro	28%	Roy Thomson Hall
May 2, 2014	Be it resolved, state surveillance is a legitimate defence of our freedoms.	Michael Hayden and Alan Dershowitz	Glenn Greenwald and Alexis Ohanian	Pro	9%	Roy Thomson Hall
November 5, 2014	Be it resolved, Obama's foreign policy is emboldening our enemies and making the world a more dangerous place.	Bret Stephens and Robert Kagan	Anne-Marie Slaughter and Fareed Zakaria	Con	11%	Roy Thomson Hall
April 10, 2015	Be it resolved, the West should engage not isolate Russia.	Stephen F. Cohen and Vladimir Pozner	Anne Applebaum and Garry Kasparov	Con	10%	Roy Thomson Hall
Sept 28, 2015	The Munk Debate on Canada's Foreign Policy	Stephen Harper, Tom Mulcair, Justin Trudeau		–	–	Roy Thomson Hall
November 6, 2015	Be it resolved, humankind's best days lie ahead.	Steven Pinker and Matt Ridley	Alain de Botton and Malcolm Gladwell	Pro	2%	Roy Thomson Hall
April 1, 2016	Be it resolved, give us your tired, your poor, your huddled masses yearning to breathe free.	Louise Arbour and Simon Schama	Nigel Farage and Mark Steyn	Con	22%	Roy Thomson Hall
September 30, 2016	Be it resolved, Donald Trump can make America great again.	Newt Gingrich and Laura Ingraham	Robert Reich and Jennifer Granholm	Pro	6%	Roy Thomson Hall
April 28, 2017	Be it resolved, the liberal international order is over.	Niall Ferguson	Fareed Zakaria	Con	5%	Roy Thomson Hall
October 12, 2017	Be it resolved, American democracy is in its worst crisis in a generation and Donald J. Trump is to blame.	Andrew Sullivan and E. J. Dionne	Newt Gingrich and Kimberly Strassel	Con	3%	Roy Thomson Hall
May 18, 2018	Be it resolved, what you call political correctness, I call progress.	Michael Eric Dyson and Michelle Goldberg	Stephen Fry and Jordan Peterson	Con	6%	Roy Thomson Hall
November 2, 2018	Be it resolved, the future of western politics is populist not liberal.	Steve Bannon	David Frum	Draw*	0%	Roy Thomson Hall
May 9, 2019	Be it resolved, China is a threat to the liberal international order.	H. R. McMaster and Michael Pillsbury	Kishore Mahbubani and Wang Huiyao	Con*	2%	Roy Thomson Hall
December 4, 2019	Be it resolved, the capitalist system is broken. It's time to try something different.	Katrina Vanden Heuvel and Yanis Varoufakis	Arthur Brooks and David Brooks	Con	2%	Roy Thomson Hall
May 12, 2022	Be it resolved, ending the world's worst geopolitical crisis in a generation starts with acknowledging Russia's security interests.	John Mearsheimer and Stephen Walt	Michael McFaul and Radosław Sikorski	Con	16%	Roy Thomson Hall
November 30, 2022	Be it resolved, don't trust Mainstream Media.	Douglas Murray and Matt Taibbi	Malcolm Gladwell and Michelle Goldberg	Pro	19%	Roy Thomson Hall
June 22, 2023	Be it resolved, AI research and development poses an existential threat.	Max Tegmark and Yoshua Bengio	Melanie Mitchell and Yann LeCun	Con	3%	Roy Thomson Hall
November 3, 2023	Be it resolved, liberalism gets the big questions right.	George Will and Jacob Rees-Mogg	Ash Sarkar and Sohrab Ahmari	Con	14%	Roy Thomson Hall
June 17, 2024	Be it resolved, anti-Zionism is antisemitism.	Douglas Murray and Natasha Hausdorff	Mehdi Hasan and Gideon Levy	Pro	5%	Roy Thomson Hall
May 29, 2025	Be it resolved, this is America's golden age.	Kellyanne Conway and Kevin Roberts	Ezra Klein and Ben Rhodes	Con	1%	Roy Thomson Hall
December 3, 2025	Be it resolved, it is in Israel's national interest to accept a two-state solution.	Ehud Olmert and Tzipi Livni	Ayelet Shaked and Michael Oren	Con	13%	Roy Thomson Hall
May 20, 2026	Be it resolved, don't go hunting monsters.	John Mearsheimer and Stephen Walt	Mike Pompeo and Victoria Nuland	Pro	1%	Meridian Hall
May 20, 2026	Be it resolved, liberalism has failed America.	Patrick Deneen	Fareed Zakaria	Con	28%	92nd Street Y

* Indicates a corrected count. The initial tally was incorrect; table includes the final, corrected accounting.

== Debate histories ==
In 2018, the debates hosted Steve Bannon, resulting in calls by several Canadian politicians for that debate to be cancelled. A rally outside Roy Thomson Hall over the debate resulted in the arrest of 12 people. The debate was held anyway. The next day, the Munk Debates announced a correction: a "technical error" had led to releasing an inaccurate debate result, wrongly stating that Bannon's arguments had swayed the audience in favor of populism. Actually, there was no net change in audience opinion.

In 2019, the debates continued to be "financially underwritten by the Canadian charitable foundation, Aurea."

=== Cancelled debates ===
Munk Debates proposed a leaders debate on foreign policy during the 2019 Canadian election. Justin Trudeau, Andrew Scheer, Jagmeet Singh and Elizabeth May were invited. Singh, Scheer and May agreed to attend. Maxime Bernier was not invited. The debate was cancelled when Trudeau refused to attend.

A scheduled November 2024 debate on Donald Trump's upcoming second term as US president had to be cancelled at the last minute when one of the signed debaters, Robert F. Kennedy Jr., was nominated by Trump for the position of Secretary of Health and Human Services and was told by the administration not to engage in public discussions before his Senate confirmation hearing.
