= Center for China and Globalization =

Think tank in China

- 全球化智库
- Abbreviation: CCG
- Formation: 2008; 18 years ago
- Founder: Wang Huiyao; Mable Miao Lu
- Type: Think tank
- Headquarters: Beijing
- President: Wang Huiyao
- Secretary General: Mable Lu Miao
- Website: www.ccg.org.cn

The Center for China and Globalization (CCG) is a Chinese think tank based in Beijing. It is registered as a non-governmental organization, though its independence from the Chinese Communist Party has been disputed. It has also occasionally been criticized on Chinese social media platforms and some of its reports censored within China.

== Leadership ==
CCG was founded in 2008 by Wang Huiyao and Mable Miao Lu, scholars who are reported to have ties to the Chinese Communist Party (CCP). Wang is a central committee member of the Jiusan Society, one of the country's eight legally permitted minor political parties led by the CCP. Wang has also served as a counselor to the State Council appointed by Premier Li Keqiang. According to The Economist, Wang is a "something of a go-between for technocratic government ministries, Chinese entrepreneurs and foreign embassies in Beijing." Victor Gao is a vice president of the CCG.

== Political stance ==
=== Residency permits and visas for foreigners ===
As a counselor to the State Council, CCG's Wang Huiyao and Mabel Lu Miao have advocated for easing the residency requirements for foreign citizens in China. In 2020, the Ministry of Justice published a draft legislation outlining new paths to permanent residence, sparking controversy among Chinese nationalists who opposed the move. Wang was vilified by nationalists for supporting the permanent residency scheme. In October 2025, CCG praised Chinese government's new visa to attract young science and technology graduates, but was attacked by Chinese nationalists.

=== Criticism of external propaganda ===
In 2021, CCG hosted an event critical of China's external propaganda as "mirroring internal propaganda in external propaganda." Chinese scholars at a CCG event "were stark about the country's global image." As a result, CCG and the scholars were targeted and media posts related to the event began to disappear.

== Controversy ==
=== Links to the Chinese Communist Party ===
CCG is a member of an alliance of think tanks, coordinated by the International Department of the Chinese Communist Party, that support the Belt and Road Initiative.

Wang Huiyao, president of CCG, was previously a vice chairman of the Western Returned Scholars Association (WRSA). He has been a standing director of the China Overseas Friendship Association (COFA). Both WRSA and COFA are under the jurisdiction of the United Front Work Department (UFWD), where Wang was once on the advisory board. In a 2015 press release, CCG stated that it was "initiated by the China Global Talents Committee and the WRSA's Suggestions Committee."

CCG has argued that it is financed primarily by private and corporate donors without government funding, and that Wang's involvement with the WRSA was merely an advisory role on its council, not formal employment. In 2023, CCG denied being "founded, run, or financed" by the WRSA, explaining that to navigate the stringent legal requirements for private think tanks, the organization had

incorrectly said WRSA was one initiator of CCG. In trying to survive, exist, and develop, CCG staff took advantage of what was plausibly available in an imperfect development environment and felt then it was preferable to mention what could be its most plausible link to an organization with over 100 years of history—longer than the CPC or PRC.

A May 2024 report by the Mercator Institute for China Studies, a German think tank, stated CCG is "private, without official governmental affiliation."

=== Wilson Center panel ===
In 2018, the Woodrow Wilson International Center for Scholars invited CCG president Wang Huiyao to a Kissinger Institute panel on Chinese influence operations in Washington, DC on May 9. In a letter to the Wilson Center, U.S. Senator Marco Rubio, then chair of the Congressional-Executive Commission on China, asked the think tank to disclose Wang's affiliation with the United Front Work Department (UFWD). Wang ended up not confirming his attendance as a panelist at the Wilson Center, but visited the Council on Foreign Relations, The Heritage Foundation, and the Asia Society instead. He visited the Wilson Center in person in 2019 and spoke virtually at a panel in 2020.

=== Collaboration with Semafor ===
In March 2023, U.S. news startup Semafor launched its "China and Global Business" initiative in partnership with CCG and the Chinese foreign ministry-affiliated China Public Diplomacy Association. Justin B. Smith, CEO of Semafor, wrote that the company was not "under the illusion that Chinese business leaders or other local groups operate independently of the Chinese Communist Party." Due to Chinese legal requirements, however, CCG "will take on local administrative responsibilities and coordinate with local sponsors, and Semafor will pay CCG for their services. The platform will be exclusively underwritten by corporate partnerships with no financial contributions from our local Chinese partners or the Chinese government."

Sara Fischer and Bethany Allen-Ebrahimian, reporting for Axios, wrote that the "speech and activities of Chinese Communist Party-linked groups are strongly influenced by Beijing. Semafor has not detailed how it plans to disclose to its audiences during live events or via digital coverage details about the group's affiliation to the CCP."

== See also ==
- Government-organized non-governmental organization
- China Institutes of Contemporary International Relations
- Institute for a Community with Shared Future
