= Mabel Lu Miao =

Chinese scholar

Mabel Lu Miao (Chinese: 苗绿) is a Chinese scholar on globalization and China, as well as the secretary general of Center for China and Globalization.

== Education ==
Miao earned her Ph.D. from Beijing Normal University, and did postdoctoral work at Hong Kong University of Science and Technology.

== Work ==
Miao is widely quoted in Chinese media. In the People's Daily, she observed China's Belt and Road Initiative brought in a wave of international students in China, which she found to be positive. In China Youth Daily, she believes Chinese schools should teach lessons on "strengthening mutual respect and understanding of cultural differences," so as to "avoid populism, nationalism, extreme individualism, and international terrorism." In Beijing Youth Daily, she argues for increasing the number of foreigners resident in China by lowering Chinese requirement to intern, work, live, and acquire permanent residence in China.

Miao advocates higher participation and influence of women in public life, saying "women shouldn't talk about only soft power, but also hard power" and activities by her thinktank must involve women as much as possible. She warns against "increasing inequality as a result of technology innovation, despite that the social, political, and economic status of women and female children have improved."

A Munich Young Leader at the Munich Security Conference, Miao is co-founder, vice president, and secretary-general of the Center for China and Globalization (CCG). At CCG, she founded the Global Young Leadership Dialogue (GYLD) that promotes exchanges between foreign young achievers and China, the first of its kind in China. Xi Jinping, General Secretary of the Chinese Communist Party, sent a letter to GYLD in 2021. Foreign dignitaries who have applauded the GYLD include Herman Achille Van Rompuy, former Prime Minister of Belgium and President of the European Council, and Pascal Lamy, former Director-General of the World Trade Organization. She led participants of the GYLD to the United Nations in China on the 77th United Nations Day.

Despite China-EU relations tanking, she co-wrote a journal article insisting there is large room for cooperation between the two.

== Books ==
Miao is the coauthor of:

- Wang, Huiyao; Miao, Lu (2016). China Goes Global. Palgrave Macmillan Asian Business Series. doi:10.1007/978-1-137-57813-6. ISBN 978-1-349-84623-8.
- Miao, Lu; Wang, Huiyao (2017). International migration of China: status, policy and social responses to the globalization of migration. Singapore: Springer. ISBN 978-981-10-6073-1.
- Wang, Huiyao; Miao, Lu (2019). China's Domestic and International Migration Development. Singapore: Springer. ISBN 978-981-13-6255-2.
- Wang, Huiyao; Miao, Lu (2020). The Globalization of Chinese Enterprises: Trends and Characteristics. doi:10.1007/978-981-15-4646-4. ISBN 978-981-15-4645-7. S2CID 219512448.

Her edited volumes include:

- Wang, Huiyao; Miao, Lu, eds. (2019). Handbook on China and globalization. Handbooks of research on contemporary China. Cheltenham, UK Northampton, MA, USA: Edward Elgar Publishing. ISBN 978-1-78536-607-9.
- Wang, Huiyao; Miao, Lu, eds. (2022). Understanding Globalization, Global Gaps, and Power Shifts in the 21st Century: CCG Global Dialogues. Palgrave Macmillan.
- Wang, Huiyao; Miao, Lu, eds. (2022). China and the world in a changing context: perspectives from ambassadors to China. China and Globalization. Singapore: Springer. ISBN 978-981-16-8085-4.
- Wang, Huiyao; Miao, Lu, eds. (2022). Transition and Opportunity: Strategies from Business Leaders on Making the Most of China's Future. China and Globalization. doi:10.1007/978-981-16-8603-0. ISBN 978-981-16-8602-3.
- Wang, Huiyao; Miao, Lu, eds. (2023). Strategies for Chinese Enterprises Going Global. The Chinese Enterprise Globalization Series. doi:10.1007/978-981-19-6120-5. ISBN 978-981-19-6119-9. S2CID 257957535.
