= Wang Huiyao =

Chinese government interlocutor

- 王辉耀
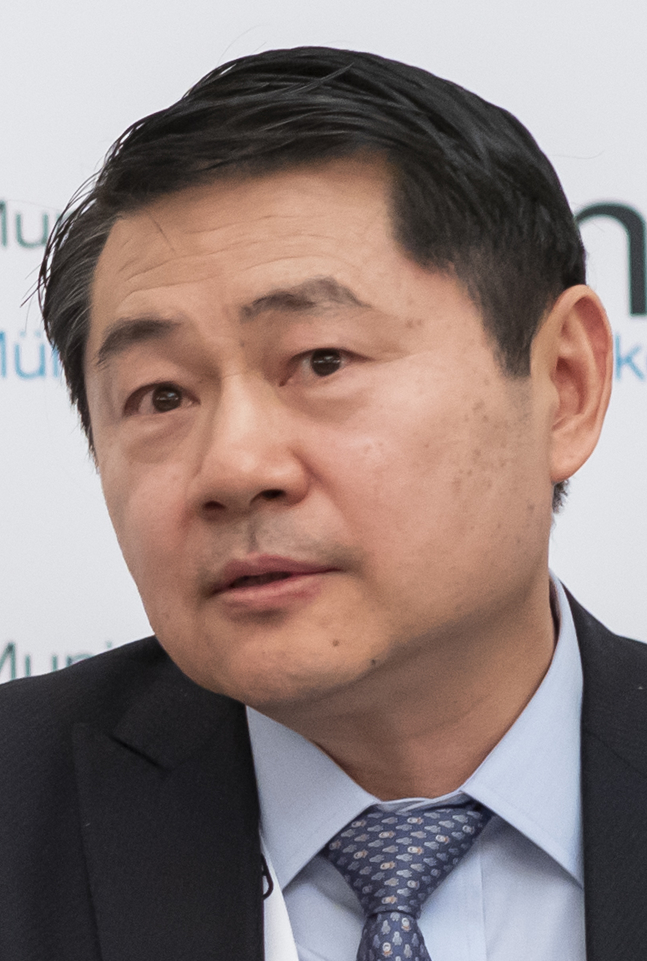
- Wang Huiyao during the MSC 2019
- Born: July 2, 1958 (age 68); Hangzhou, Zhejiang, China
- Education: Guangdong University of Foreign Studies (BA); University of Windsor (MBA); University of Western Ontario (PhD); University of Manchester (PhD)
- Known for: Founder and President of Center for China and Globalization
- Political party: Jiusan Society
- Website: www.wanghuiyao.com

Wang Huiyao (Chinese: 王辉耀; born July 2, 1958), also known as Henry Wang, is the founder and president of Center for China and Globalization (CCG), a think tank in China. Wang plays multiple policy advisory roles in China, as a counselor for the State Council appointed by Premier Li Keqiang in 2015, and honorable vice chairman of China Association for International Economic Cooperation (CAIEC) under the Ministry of Commerce.

== Early life ==
Wang Huiyao became one of those who were enrolled in college after the entrance examination system was re-instituted in 1977. After graduating from Guangdong University of Foreign Studies, he worked as an official in the Ministry of Foreign Trade and Economic Cooperation a couple of years (now Ministry of Commerce). Then, he went on to study abroad and received an MBA from the University of Windsor in Ontario Canada. Afterwards, he obtained his PhD degrees at the University of Western Ontario and University of Manchester. Meanwhile, he worked a number of years in Canada's business sector, including serving as Chief Trade Representative for Quebec Government Office in Hong Kong and Greater China. His senior corporate positions include Director of Asia at SNC-Lavalin and Vice President for AMEC-Agra in Canada.

Wang was also a senior fellow at Harvard Kennedy School and a visiting fellow at Brookings, the experience which most of his "articles and books about U.S. think tanks largely based on", as well as a senior fellow at Asia Pacific Foundation of Canada. Besides, Wang was an adjunct professor at the Guanghua Management School of Peking University and Richard Ivey School of Business at the University of Western Ontario.

== Career ==
Wang is a steering committee member of the Paris Peace Forum, and a member of the Migration Advisory Board of International Organization of Migration (IOM) of United Nations. He is also the Dean of Institute of Development Studies of China Southwestern University of Finance and Economics and a member of the Duke Kunshan University Advisory Council.

Wang frequently participates in the discussion and debates about global issues like China and globalization, global governance, international trade and investment, global migration and talent, as well as think tank development, such as Munich Security Conference, Munk Debates, Paris Peace Forum, and Athens Democracy Forum. Wang, an advocate for "Track II" diplomacy between China-foreign academic exchange, has joined and held multiple dialogues between Chinese and US think tanks and research institutes, including CSIS, the Hudson Institute, and Brookings Institution. He has also been interviewed by The New York Times, CNN, and BBC News for the perspectives on trade and globalization issues as well as China policies.

Wang is a central committee member of the Jiusan Society, one of the country's eight legally permitted minor political parties subservient to the Chinese Communist Party. Wang has also served as a director of the China Overseas Friendship Association, an external name for the Ninth Bureau of the United Front Work Department of the Central Committee of the Chinese Communist Party. According to a statement by the CCG, Wang is also vice chairman of the Western Returned Scholars Association, which is under the jurisdiction of the United Front Work Department. In 2018, Wang's affiliation with the United Front Work Department attracted the attention of Senator Marco Rubio and sparked subsequent discussions of government influence with think tanks. Wang remains a guest of U.S. thinktanks, including the Center for Strategic and International Studies, Hudson Institute, and The Woodrow Wilson Center, which Rubio questioned in 2018.

He was a senior fellow at Harvard Kennedy School and a visiting fellow at Brookings Institution.

== Activities ==
Wang has actively advocated for "Track II" diplomacy to increase China-foreign academic and business exchange, and has joined and held a number of dialogues between Chinese and US think tanks and research institutes.

Wang has been interviewed by global media outlets, such as GZERO Media, Al-Jazeera, Bloomberg, and the Wall Street Journal, to comment on trade and economic issues as well as China policies. He has been a contributor and columnist to a number of media such as The New York Times, Financial Times, and the South China Morning Post.

In 2020, Wang and the CCG "promoted the permanent-residency scheme" for foreigners in China, which led him to be "vilified online as a traitor" by some, according to The Economist.
