= Manama Dialogue =

Annual security and geopolitical conference

The Manama Dialogue is an annual global security and geopolitical conference held annually since 2004 in the Kingdom of Bahrain under the auspices of the International Institute for Strategic Studies and the Ministry Foreign Affairs in Manama, Bahrain.

The 20th IISS Manama Dialogue took place 6-8 December 2024.

During the November 2023 Manama Dialogue conference the topics ranging from governance in the wake of the COVID-19 pandemic to the Gaza war feature on the agenda; the heads of ministries from around the globe frequently attend, as do business leaders.

During the December 2024 Manama Dialogue conference the topic of the resurgence of rebel forces in Syria was discussed; in fact, the Assad regime fell while the conference was ongoing. Anne Neuberger, American deputy national security advisor for cyber and emerging technology told reporters that the Salt Typhoon campaign was a "focused" operation, recording high-level people in politics for espionage purposes.

In 2025, the BDS Movement and the Gulf Coalition Against Normalization (an umbrella organization of pro-Palestine groups in Arab States of teh Persian Gulf) called for a boycott of the Manama Dialogue until it stops hosting Israeli officials and representatives of Zionist lobby organizations like AIPAC. Israeli involvement in the conference began after the Bahraini government joined the Abraham Accords in 2020.
