= Justin B. Smith =

American media executive (born 1969)

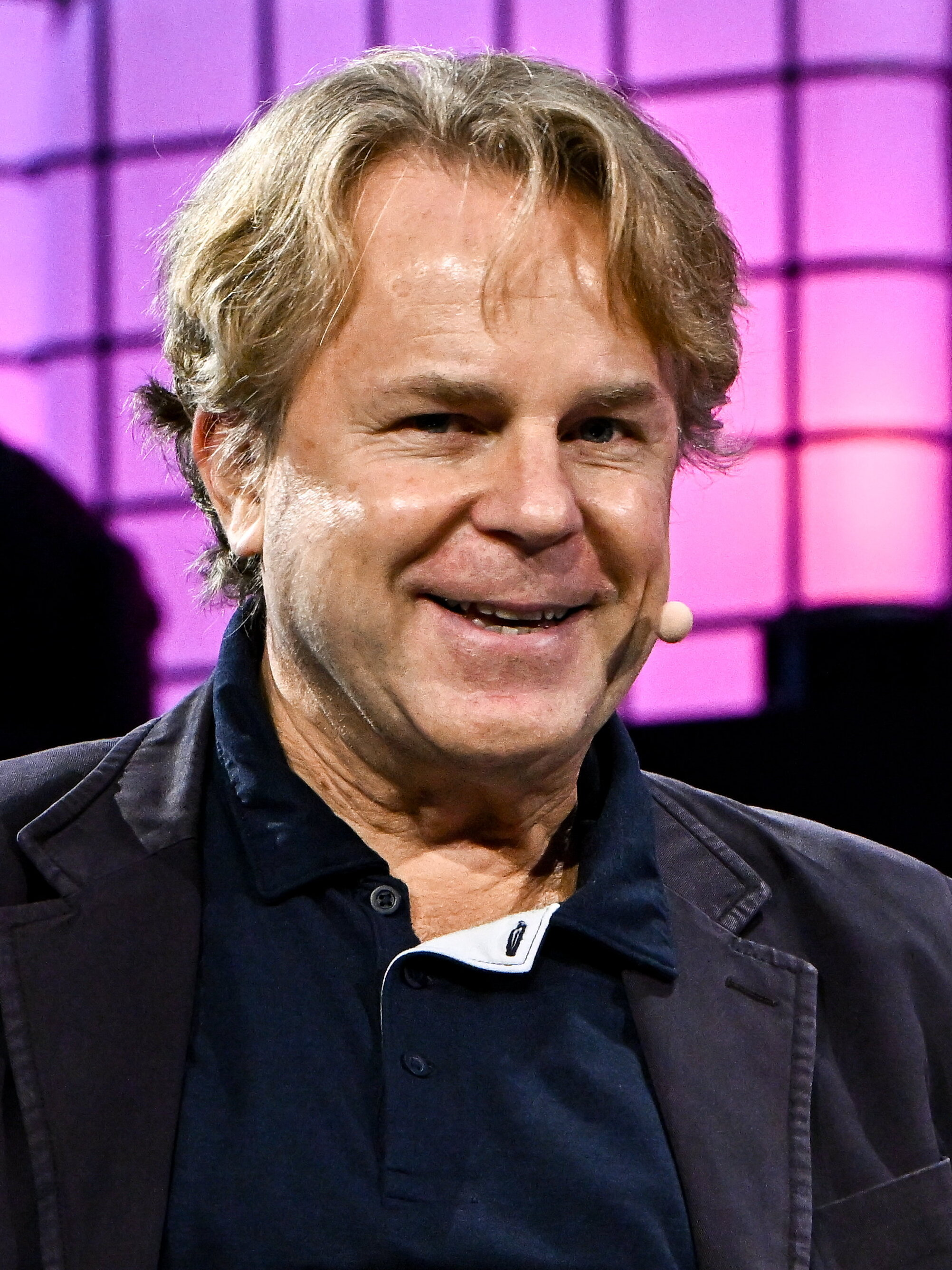
- Smith in 2024
- Born: August 13, 1969 (age 57); Hartford, Connecticut
- Education: Phillips Academy, Georgetown University
- Occupations: Co-founder and CEO of Semafor
- Employer: Semafor
- Board member of: Georgetown University, Elizabeth Glaser Pediatric AIDS Foundation

Justin B. Smith (born August 13, 1969) is an American media executive. He co-founded the news website Semafor in 2022. He was previously the chief executive officer of Bloomberg Media Group. Before joining Bloomberg, Smith worked for Atlantic Media, The Week magazine and The Economist.

== Career ==
Smith began his career at the Department of State in 1991, working in the U.S. Embassy at Ouagadougou, the capital of Burkina Faso, under Ambassador Edward Brynn. After leaving the State Department, Smith joined the International Herald Tribune. He worked in Paris and in Hong Kong, where he helped build the newspaper's conference business. Smith then joined The Economist as the head of corporate strategy, working from London, Hong Kong and New York City.

In 2001, Smith joined The Week, where he helped launch a U.S. version of the weekly news magazine founded in London. In 2005, Smith was promoted to president of the magazine. In 2006, he had helped The Week reach more than 443,000 U.S. subscribers. While at The Week, Smith was named to AdAge's "40 Under 40" list.

In 2007, Smith was hired as president of Atlantic Consumer Media at The Atlantic. Smith was later promoted to president of Atlantic Media Company, which gave him responsibility over National Journal and Government Executive. By 2010, under his leadership, The Atlantic made a $1.8 million profit, the first time the magazine had been profitable in decades. While at The Atlantic, Smith oversaw the launch of several digital brands. In 2009, the company launched The Atlantic Wire, a news content and aggregation site now called The Wire. Site traffic reached nearly one million monthly visitors within one year of launch. In 2012, while leading Atlantic Media, Smith founded a new global business news brand, Quartz. In 2013, Atlantic Media launched Defense One for reporting on national security.

In 2010, Smith and The Atlantic publisher Jay Lauf were named Ad Age's Publishing Executives of the Year, and The Atlantic was ranked second on Ad Age's list of A-list magazines.

Smith is also the founder of Breaking Media, a collection of specialized websites that includes Above the Law, Dealbreaker and Fashionista.

== Bloomberg ==
In July 2013, Bloomberg LP hired Justin Smith as the chief executive officer of Bloomberg Media Group, which comprises Bloomberg Television, Bloomberg Radio, Bloomberg Businessweek, and digital businesses globally. Smith reported to Bloomberg LP President and CEO Dan Doctoroff. Later that year, Smith said he would add online destinations to Bloomberg and invest more in digital video.

In April 2014, Smith hired veteran journalists Mark Halperin and John Heilemann, who wrote Game Change and Double Down: Game Change 2012 on the 2008 and 2012 presidential elections respectively, to create a new Bloomberg website focused on American politics and policy.

In January 2022, he stepped down as CEO to found Semafor with former New York Times journalist Ben Smith.

== Personal life ==
Smith was born on August 13, 1969, in Hartford, Connecticut. His American father was president of the American College in Paris and his English mother was an artist. He was raised in Paris, where he attended the École Internationale Bilingue until high school, at which point his parents moved him to Massachusetts, where he attended Fessenden School and Phillips Andover Academy. After finishing secondary school, he attended the School of Foreign Service at Georgetown University in 1991. Smith served as a member of the Georgetown University Board of Directors and is a lifetime member of the Council on Foreign Relations. He is the founder of the Bali Purnati Center for the Arts on the island of Bali and the Ouagadougou Education project. In 2013, Smith was named a Henry Crown Fellow at the Aspen Institute, and in 2014, he was named to the board of directors for the Elizabeth Glaser Pediatric AIDS Foundation.

Smith lives in Washington, D.C., and New York City. As of 2021, he was dating American actress Uma Thurman.
