= The Wall Street Journal Europe =

Discontinued version of American newspaper

- Type: Daily newspaper
- Format: Broadsheet
- Owner(s): Dow Jones & Company (owned by News Corp)
- Founded: 1983
- Language: English
- Ceased publication: September 27, 2017
- Headquarters: Brussels, Belgium
- Website: http://europe.wsj.com/home-page

The Wall Street Journal Europe was a daily English-language newspaper that covered global and regional business news for Europe, the Middle East, and Africa (EMEA). Published by the Dow Jones & Company, a News Corp company, it formed as a part of the business publication franchise that included The Wall Street Journal, The Wall Street Journal Asia, and The Wall Street Journal Online. The final print edition of the newspaper was published on 29 September 2017.

== Background ==
Founded in 1983, The Wall Street Journal Europe was printed in nine locations throughout the region, including in Belgium, Germany, Ireland, Italy, Spain, Switzerland, Turkey, the U.K., and Israel. The paper was distributed in more than 60 countries, and almost 80% of its subscribers were European citizens. The paper ceased publication in 2017.

The website of The Wall Street Journal Europe offered news and analysis, opinion, market data, and multimedia features tailored for a European audience by a London-based editorial team. Blogs included New Europe, covering Eastern and Central Europe; Iain Martin's blog on U.K. Politics The Source; and Real Time Brussels, offering analysis on events through the European business day.

Content was also available via mobile devices, including a Europe edition of the WSJ.com BlackBerry Reader. A mobile-optimized website provided continually updated news, information, and analysis from Europe.WSJ.com via any web-enabled mobile device or smartphone.

== Circulation figures ==
Growth figures for circulation of The Wall Street Journal Europe may not be directly comparable to that of other newspapers beginning January 2008 due to the Journal's contract with Executive Learning Partnership (ELP) of the Netherlands. This agreement involved ELP's purchasing copies of the newspaper at between 1–5 cents a copy, well below normal market price. These copies, given at no cost to students, represented 41% of The Wall Street Journal Europe circulation by 2010. Since ELP received payments from the Journal through intermediary companies, some journalists and a whistleblower then employed by the Journal alleged that the newspaper was secretly boosting circulation figures by buying its own papers. This could have had a positive impact on the newspaper's advertising revenues. The contract also committed the Journal to publishing articles that reportedly promoted ELP's activities. While maintaining that the arrangement was legitimate and appropriate, the European managing director of the Journal's parent Dow Jones & Company, Andrew Langhoff, resigned in October 2011. Les Hinton, who was chief executive officer of Dow Jones & Company and who was reportedly advised of the arrangement with ELP, resigned in July 2011 in conjunction with the unrelated News International phone hacking scandal.
