= Thousand Talents Plan =

Chinese academic program

- Simplified Chinese: 千人计划
- Traditional Chinese: 千人計劃
Transcriptions
Standard Mandarin
- Hanyu Pinyin: Qiān rén jìhuà

Alternative Chinese name
- Simplified Chinese: 海外高层次人才引进计划
- Traditional Chinese: 海外高層次人才引進計劃
- Literal meaning: Overseas High-Level Talent Recruitment Programs
Transcriptions
Standard Mandarin
- Hanyu Pinyin: Hǎiwài gāo céngcì réncái yǐnjìn jìhuà

The Thousand Talents Plan or Thousand Talents Program (TTP), or Overseas High-Level Talent Recruitment Programs is a program by the government of the People's Republic of China to recruit experts in science and technology from abroad, principally but not exclusively from overseas Chinese communities. The original program was replaced by another program called Qiming, administered by the Ministry of Industry and Information Technology.

Law enforcement and counterintelligence agencies in the United States, Australia, Canada, and other countries have raised concerns about the program as a vector for intellectual property theft and espionage.

== Background ==
According to data from the U.S. Department of Energy's Oak Ridge Institute for Science and Education, 92 percent of Chinese who received a science or technology Ph.D. in the U.S. in 2002 were still in the U.S. in 2007. To reverse this trend and to build the size and prestige of China's university system, the central government of China recognized the need and turned to attracting overseas Chinese and top foreign-born talent from the world's best universities.

The Thousand Talent program is the most prominent of China's more than 200 talent recruitment programs. It grew out of the "Talent Superpower Strategy" of the 17th National Congress of the Chinese Communist Party (CCP) in 2007. The CCP Central Committee and State Council of the People's Republic of China elevated the program in 2010 to become the top-level award given through China's National Talent Development Plan to strengthen innovation and international competitiveness within China. In 2019, the program was re-branded as the "National High-end Foreign Experts Recruitment Plan." The CCP's United Front Work Department's Western Returned Scholars Association is the official representative body for program participants.

Previous attempts to attract foreign scientific talent through a decentralized network of approximately 600 "talent recruitment stations" worldwide had been largely ineffective at convincing top researchers to leave developed countries permanently.

== Selection ==
The Thousand Talents program primarily targets Chinese citizens who were educated in elite programs overseas and who have been successful as entrepreneurs, professionals, and researchers. The program also recognizes a small number of elite foreign-born experts with skills that are critical to China's international competitiveness in science and innovation. International experts in the latter category are typically winners of major prizes such as the Nobel Prize and the Fields Medal, and are expected first to have made internationally renowned contributions to a field of technological importance to China, and secondly to hold either a tenured position at one of the world's top universities or a senior role in an internationally important research organization. In 2013, the Junior Thousand Talent Plan was created to attract faculty members under the age of 40 who have performed high impact research at one of the world's top universities.

The program includes two mechanisms: resources for permanent recruitment into Chinese academia, and resources for short-term appointments that typically target international experts who have full-time employment at a leading international university or research laboratory.

Within a decade of the announcement of the Thousand Talents Plan in 2008, it had attracted more than 7,000 people overall. More than 1,400 people participating in the Thousand Talents Plan, including several foreigners, specialize in life sciences fields.

More than 300 scientists and scholars at Australian tertiary institutions are connected to the program, according to research by Australian Strategic Policy Institute.

The Thousand Talents Plan professorship is the highest academic honor awarded by the State Council, analogous to the top-level award given by the Ministry of Education.

In 2010, China began the Thousand Youth Talent Plan. It focuses on the recruitment of early career STEM scholars.

In 2011, China began the Thousand Foreign Experts Plan and the Special Talent Zone, followed by the Ten Thousand Talents Plan in 2012.

=== Benefits to participants ===
The program confers the prestigious title of "Thousand Talents Plan Distinguished Professor" (千人计划特聘教授) or "Junior Thousand Talents Plan Professor" upon the selected individuals, and provides benefits including this prestigious title, high pay, and visa privileges. The program is the first ever to enable individuals of extraordinary ability to gain access to Chinese immigration visas, including "long-stay visas." The program provides a one-time bonus of 1 million RMB to select individuals, substantial resources for research and academic exchange, and assistance with housing and transportation costs. Thousand Talents scholars are eligible for high levels of Chinese government funding.

Participants in the Young Thousand Talents program receive a one-time award of 500,000 RMB and start-up grants between 1 million and three million RMB. These packages are typically matched by host institutions in China or local governments. Participants also receive fringe benefits including subsidized housing and prioritization when applying for grants.

== Reaction ==
=== Conflict of interest and fraud allegations ===
Some Thousand Talents Plan Professors have reported fraud in the program including misappropriated grant funding, poor accommodations, and violations of research ethics. Concerns were raised because some TTP contracts contain non-disclosure agreements that forbid informing the home university or home government of the award. Dismissals due to undisclosed connections to the TTP have taken place. In 2019, executives and researchers at the H. Lee Moffitt Cancer Center & Research Institute resigned following scrutiny into their links with the TTP. Individuals who receive either of China's two top academic awards, the Thousand Talents Professorship and the Changjiang (Yangtze River) Scholar award, have become targets for recruitment by China's wealthiest universities so frequently that the Ministry of Education issued notices in both 2013 and 2017 discouraging Chinese universities from recruiting away top talent from one another.

=== Effectiveness assessments ===
Evaluations of the program's efficacy and impact have been mixed. Although the program has successfully attracted top international talent to China, its efficacy in retaining these talented individuals has been questioned, with many of the most talented scientists willing to spend short periods in China but unwilling to abandon their tenured positions at major Western universities. A study published in 2023 concluded that the scholars were on average in the top 15% of productivity (albeit not top caliber) caliber and outperformed overseas peers in last-authored publications because of better access to resources in China.

=== Foreign government reactions ===
==== Canada ====
In August 2020, Canadian Security Intelligence Service (CSIS) warned both Canadian universities and Canadian research institutions of the TTP, saying that it recruited researchers and scientists around the world to persuade them to share their research and technology — either willingly or by coercion.

==== South Korea ====
In June 2023, the Seoul Metropolitan Police Agency arrested a Chinese TTP researcher on espionage charges for allegedly stealing thousands of files relating to medical robot technology.

==== United States ====
The success of the program in recruiting U.S.-trained scientists back to China has been viewed with concern from the U.S., with a June 2018 report from the National Intelligence Council declaring an underlying motivation of the program to be "to facilitate the legal and illicit transfer of US technology, intellectual property and know-how" to China. US and Canadian authorities have asserted that China intends to use scientists who are involved with this plan to gain access to new technology for economic and military advantage. The Federal Bureau of Investigation (FBI) has indicated that foreign recruitment sponsor talent plans "to bring outside knowledge and innovation back to their countries—and sometimes that means stealing trade secrets, breaking export control laws, or violating conflict-of-interest policies to do so."

In January 2020, the FBI arrested Charles M. Lieber, the chair of Harvard University's Department of Chemistry and Chemical Biology, for lying about his ties to the program, and was convicted in December 2021. In May 2020, the FBI arrested a former researcher at the Cleveland Clinic for failing to disclose ties to the Thousand Talents Program, although a year later federal prosecutors dismissed the case. In June 2020, it was reported that the National Institutes of Health had investigations into the behavior of 189 scientists. In November 2020, Song Guo Zheng, a TTP participant, pled guilty to making false claims to the FBI about his ties to the Chinese government during his employment at Ohio State University.

In November 2019, the US Senate Permanent Subcommittee on Investigations and Committee on Homeland Security and Governmental Affairs held an open hearing on the China's Talent Recruitment Plans, including the TTP, and called the programs a threat to national security. The report from the hearing cited TTP contracts as violating research values, TTP members willfully failing to disclose their membership to their home institutions, and cited numerous cases against TTP members for theft of intellectual property and fraud. One TTP member stole proprietary defense information on U.S. military jet engines. The report indicated that "TTP targets U.S.-based researchers and scientists, regardless of ethnicity or citizenship, who focus on or have access to cutting-edge research and technology."

In 2019, the National Institute of Health (NIH) completed a yearlong investigation into research violations. Among other issues, it noticed after going over published papers that scores of researchers revealed their affiliation with or funding from institutions in China but had failed to report those ties to their home institution or the NIH. Michael Lauer, who oversaw the extramural research program, said that while TTP is not a threat, participants should fully disclose that relationship.

In September 2022, it was reported that TTP programs recruited over 150 scientists who worked on U.S. government-sponsored research at Los Alamos National Laboratory.

In August 2026, Ohio State University reached an agreement with the U.S. Department of Justice to pay $2.1 million to settle U.S. government allegations that the university failed to timely disclose a principal investigator's participation in the Thousand Talents Program to NASA and the National Science Foundation.

=== Academia ===
Although the program has successfully attracted top international talent to China, its efficacy in retaining these talented individuals has been questioned, with many of the most talented scientists willing to spend short periods in China but unwilling to abandon their tenured positions at major Western universities.

According to academic Scott Moore, the Chinese government had been the most assertive government in the world in introducing policies like the Thousand Talents Plan to trigger "a reverse brain drain." Moore stated that while the program posed several challenges for developed democracies such as incentivizing recruited professors to improperly transfer of resources to their concurrent workplace in China, the biggest challenges had less to do with national security than to "increasingly outdated and misguided immigration policies common among developed democracies." According to Moore, the high number of participants in the program with a specialization in the life sciences prompted US policymakers to view the TTP as signaling by Beijing of its intention to "mount a full-spectrum challenge to US leadership in the biotechnology sector", with one US policymaker saying the TTP helped build China's talent pipeline for the sector.

In a study funded by the National Natural Science Foundation of China, academics Dongbo Shi, Weichen Liu, and Yanbo Wang conducted an analysis of Young Thousand Talent program participants, and concluded "that China's YTT program has been successful in recruiting and nurturing high-caliber scientists and that YTT scientists outperform their overseas peers in post-return publication, mainly owing to their access to greater funding and larger research teams. These results show the potential of talent programs as a policy tool for countries to attract expatriate scientists and promote their productivity."

== See also ==
- China Scholarship Council
- Made in China 2025
- Beijing Overseas Talent Aggregation Project
