= Western Returned Scholars Association =

Chinese united front organization

- 欧美同学会
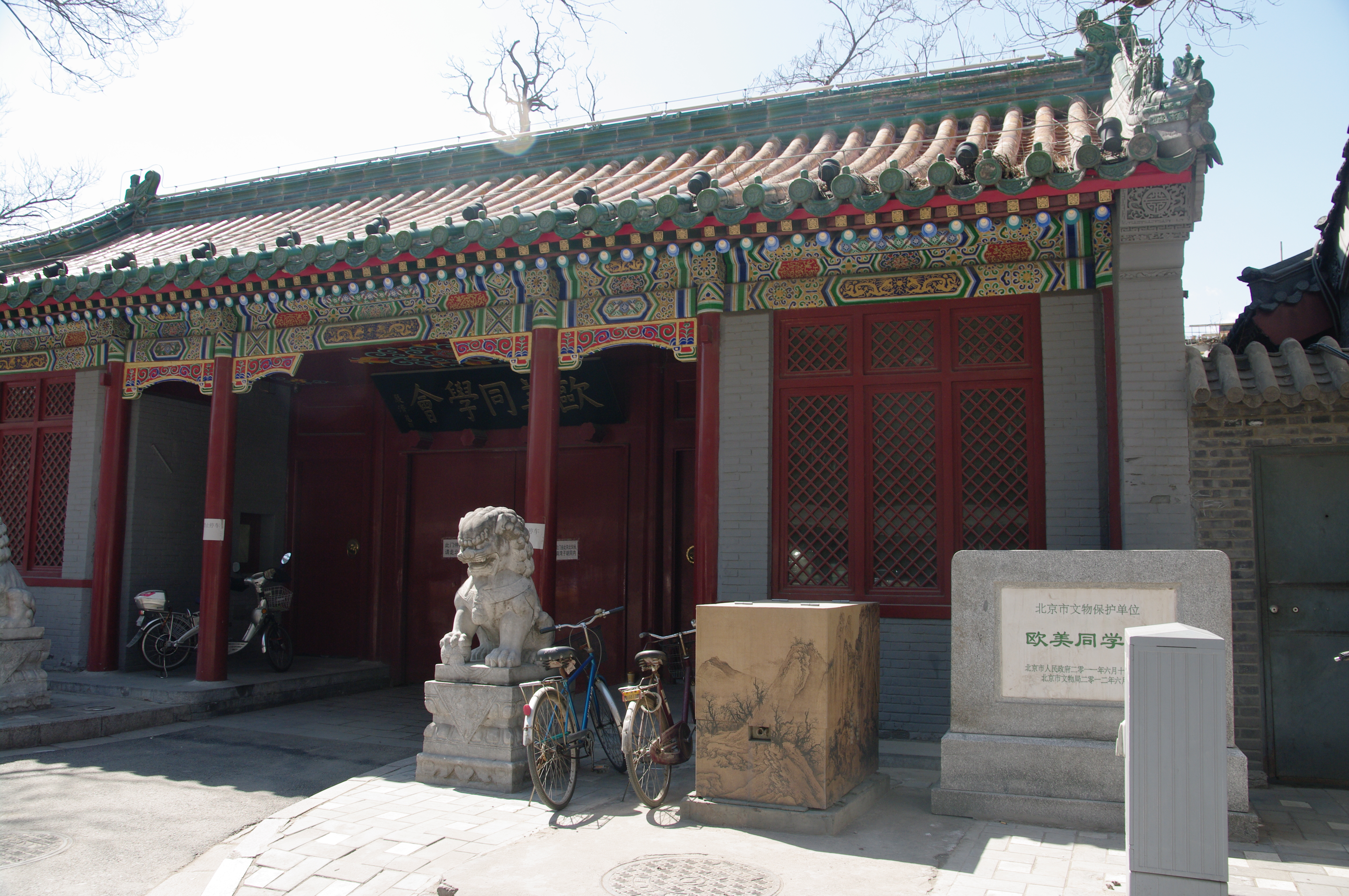
- Headquarters of the Western Returned Scholars Association
- Formation: October 1913; 113 years ago
- Type: People's organization
- Headquarters: Ruide Building, No. 5 Yumin East Road, Xicheng, Beijing
- President: Ding Zhongli
- Parent organization: United Front Work Department
- Website: www.wrsa.net

Western Returned Scholars Association
- Simplified Chinese: 欧美同学会
- Traditional Chinese: 歐美同學會
Transcriptions
Standard Mandarin
- Hanyu Pinyin: Ōuměi Tóngxuéhuì

Alternate name
- Simplified Chinese: 中国留学人员联谊会
- Traditional Chinese: 中國留學人員聯誼會
Transcriptions
Standard Mandarin
- Hanyu Pinyin: Zhōngguó Liúxué Rényuán Liányìhuì

The Western Returned Scholars Association (WRSA) is a people's organization composed mainly of returned overseas Chinese students from various countries. It is under the United Front Work Department (UFWD) of the Chinese Communist Party (CCP).

== History ==
The original WRSA was founded in October 1913 in Beijing by Wellington Koo, Liang Dunyan, Zhan Tianyou, Cai Yuanpei, Yan Huiqing, Chengting T. Wang, and Zhou Yichun, among others.

The organization ceased activities during the Cultural Revolution, and resumed its activities in 1982.

== Functions ==
According to analyst Alex Joske, the WRSA is "the UFWD's primary body for interacting with ethnic Chinese scholars and scientists". It runs the official association for participants for the Thousand Talents Plan. It is managed by the UFWD's Non-Affiliated and Minor Party Intellectuals Work Bureau and led by the CCP Secretariat. In the 2020s, the WRSA has come under greater scrutiny in the West.

== Organization ==
=== Presidents ===
Name	Took office	Left office	Notes
Liang Dunyan	1913	1918	
Lu Zhengxiang	1918	1925	
Chengting T. Wang	1925	Late 1920s	
Hu Shih	Late 1920s	1949	
Li Zongen	1949	1950	
Yan Jici	1950	1951	
Cao Richang	1952	1953	
Zhang Yuanshan	1953	1955	
Li Zongen	1955	1956	
Chen Daisun	1957	1958	
Ye Jingxin	1958	1961	
Chu Coching	1961		
Mao Yisheng	1982	1991	President of the 1st Council
Lu Jiaxi	1991	1995	President of the 2nd Council
Wu Jieping	1995	1999	President of the 3rd Council
Ding Shisun	1999	2003	President of the 4th Council
Han Qide	2003	2013	President of the 5th and 6th Council
Chen Zhu	2013	2021	President of the 7th Council
Ding Zhongli	2021	Incumbent	President of the 8th Council
