= List of international prime ministerial trips made by Theresa May =

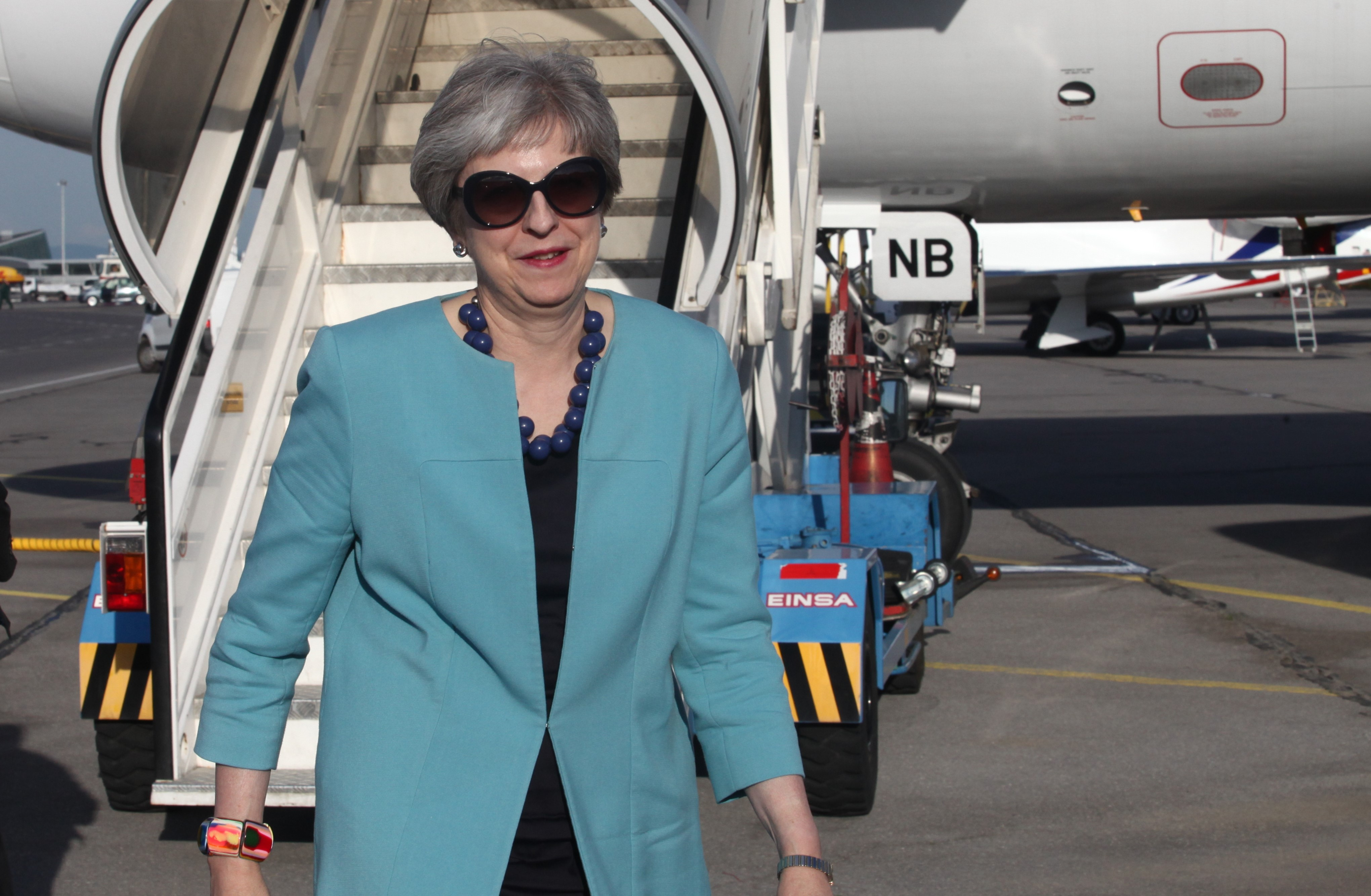
Prime Minister Theresa May arrives in Sofia, May 2018.

This is a list of international prime ministerial trips made by Theresa May, who served as Prime Minister of the United Kingdom from 13 July 2016 until her resignation on 24 July 2019. Theresa May made 77 trips to 33 countries and one British Overseas Territory during her premiership.

== Summary ==
The number of visits per country/territory where May travelled are:

- One: Akrotiri and Dhekelia, Argentina, Bahrain, Bulgaria, Estonia, Egypt, India, Iraq, Kenya, Macedonia, Malta, Nigeria, Norway, Slovakia, South Africa, Spain and Turkey
- Two: Austria, Canada, China, Denmark, Ireland, Japan, Jordan, Saudi Arabia and Sweden
- Three: Italy, Netherlands, Poland and Switzerland
- Four: United States
- Nine: Germany
- Ten: France
- Twenty-seven: Belgium

World map highlighting the 33 countries visited by Theresa May during her premiership: United Kingdom One visit Two visits Three visits Four visits Seven or more visits

== 2016 ==
#	Country	Location	Date	Details	Image
1	Germany	Berlin	20–21 July	Inaugural visit to Chancellor Angela Merkel in Berlin to discuss Germany–United Kingdom relations while the United Kingdom prepares for Brexit, insisting that the UK intends to retain the "closest economic links" with European countries despite withdrawing from the European Union. May has said that the UK does not plan to invoke Article 50 of the Treaty on European Union within the year, saying that the UK needs time to secure a "sensible and orderly departure" from the EU.	
1	France	Paris	21 July	May met with President François Hollande in Paris to discuss France–United Kingdom relations while the United Kingdom prepares for Brexit, insisting that the UK intends to retain the "closest economic links" with European countries despite withdrawing from the European Union.	
2	Italy	Rome	27 July	May met with Prime Minister Matteo Renzi at the Villa Doria Pamphili in Rome to discuss the UK's relationship with the European Union following Brexit. The two premiers agreed to maintain the "closest possible economic ties" once the UK leaves the EU. Renzi said that Brexit negotiations should be as "efficient as possible" and suggested the use of a timeline. During a press conference, May said that the British government would guarantee the rights of EU citizens living in the UK to be protected under the condition that the rights of British citizens living in other EU member states would also be guaranteed.	
2	Slovakia	Bratislava	28 July	May met with Prime Minister Robert Fico in Bratislava to discuss the UK's relationship with the European Union following Brexit.	
2	Poland	Warsaw	28 July	May met with Prime Minister Beata Szydło in Warsaw to discuss the UK's relationship with the European Union following Brexit.	
3	China	Hangzhou	4–5 September	In her first trip outside of Europe as prime minister, May travelled to China to attend the G20 summit.	
4	United States	New York City	19–20 September	May travelled to New York City to participate in the General Debate of the seventy-first session of the United Nations General Assembly, where she also gave her first address to the General Assembly. She also held bilateral meetings with world leaders including UN Secretary General Ban Ki-moon, Malcolm Turnbull (Australia), Abdel Fattah el-Sisi (Egypt), Hassan Rouhani (Iran), Shinzō Abe (Japan), Joseph Muscat (Malta), John Key (New Zealand), Nawaz Sharif (Pakistan) and President Erdoğan of Turkey. She also attended a reception for American companies operating in the United Kingdom.	
5	Denmark	Kongens Lyngby	10 October	May met with Prime Minister Lars Løkke Rasmussen at the Marienborg in Kongens Lyngby, near Copenhagen. Løkke said that the Danish and British governments will aim for a "friendly divorce" as the United Kingdom would trigger Article 50 of the Treaty on European Union by the end of March 2017. Both prime ministers "firmly agreed" to "stand up for free trade" between Denmark and the UK as the latter prepares for its Brexit negotiations.	
5	The Netherlands	The Hague	10 October	May met with Prime Minister Mark Rutte in the Hague to gain the Netherlands' support ahead of the United Kingdom's Brexit negotiations. Both prime ministers discussed enhancing and maintaining Netherlands–UK relations ahead of the negotiations.	
6	Spain	Madrid	13 October	May met with acting Prime Minister Mariano Rajoy during a working lunch at the Moncloa Palace in Madrid to discuss the effect of Brexit on Spain–United Kingdom relations and the proposed second Scottish independence referendum, to which Rajoy said that Spain supports a "continued integrity" of the United Kingdom. May pledged to protect the interests of Spaniards in the United Kingdom amid the effects of the Brexit negotiations, while Rajoy also pledged a similar commitment to the Britons in Spain. They may have also discussed the disputed status of Gibraltar.	
7	Belgium	Brussels	20 October	May attended her first European Council summit, where the European migrant crisis, trade, and Russia were on the agenda. May also laid out her approach for the Brexit negotiations, which includes triggering Article 50 of the Treaty on European Union by the end of March 2017.	
8	India	New Delhi, Bangalore	6–8 November	In her first bilateral trip outside Europe and first trade mission, May met with Prime Minister Narendra Modi in New Delhi to discuss India–United Kingdom trade relations following Brexit and to inaugurate the India–UK Tech Summit. In New Delhi, she also visited the India Gate and the Gandhi Smriti, and met with President Pranab Mukherjee. In Bangalore, May met with Karnataka Chief Minister Siddaramaiah, visited school children at the Stonehill Government School, toured the Dynamatic Technologies facility, and visited the Halasuru Someshwara Temple.	
9	Germany	Berlin	18 November	May met with Chancellor Angela Merkel, French President François Hollande, Italian Prime Minister Matteo Renzi, and U.S. President Barack Obama to discuss trade, the Russo-Ukrainian War, the Syrian civil war, and Islamic State of Iraq and the Levant.	
10	Bahrain	Manama	6–7 December	May attended a summit of the Gulf Cooperation Council in Manama and held bilateral meetings with each leader of the member states to discuss security cooperation, trade and investment, the Syrian and Yemeni civil wars, and Iran. She also met with investors, Royal Navy personnel of the Joint Expeditionary Force on HMS Ocean, and the Bahraini youth. May became the first British Prime Minister and woman leader to participate in the Gulf Cooperation Council summit.	
11	Belgium	Brussels	15 December	May attended the European Council summit.	

== 2017 ==
#	Country	Location	Date	Details	Image
12	Switzerland	Davos	19 January	May addressed and met with business leaders at the World Economic Forum in Davos, reassuring them of their relationship amid her government's Brexit plans.	
13	United States	Philadelphia, Washington, D.C.	26–27 January	May met with Congressional Republicans at their biannual joint retreat in Philadelphia, on 26 January. May addressed both the House Republican Conference and the Senate Republican Conference, where she called on U.S. lawmakers not to renounce the Iran nuclear deal and to support international organizations like NATO and the United Nations. Following this, May travelled to Washington, D.C. to meet with President Donald Trump at the White House. She was the first head of government to meet with Trump since his inauguration. The two leaders discussed trade relations ahead of the Brexit negotiations, NATO, the Syrian Civil War, relations with Russia, and counter-terrorism. May also laid a wreath at the Tomb of the Unknowns at Arlington National Cemetery.	
14	Turkey	Ankara	28 January	May met with President Recep Tayyip Erdoğan and Prime Minister Binali Yıldırım. May became the first Western leader to visit Turkey following the attempted coup in the Summer of 2016. May discussed free trade agreements with Turkey after Brexit process, including the establishment of a joint working group to lay the groundwork for a free trade agreement. May also discussed counter-terrorism, fight against ISIL and ongoing reunification talks on Cyprus. In addition, May also agreed a £100 million defence deal with Turkey, in order to help Turkey develop their own fighter jets. May also laid a wreath at the tomb of Mustafa Kemal Atatürk, the founder of modern-day Turkey.	
15	Ireland	Dublin	30 January	May met with Taoiseach Enda Kenny ahead of the Brexit negotiations triggering Article 50, to which May and Kenny expressed their desires for a "seamless, frictionless" border between the Republic and Northern Ireland.	
16	Malta	Valletta	3 February	May attended the EU summit, where the European migrant crisis, the Trump administration, and Brexit were discussed. This summit gave May the opportunity to discuss with other EU leaders her government's plans for triggering Article 50 of the Treaty on European Union to withdraw from the EU, as the Parliament reads the bill required for withdrawal. She departed Valletta in the afternoon as the other EU leaders discussed Brexit without her.	
17	Belgium	Brussels	9–10 March	May attended the European Council summit.	
18	Jordan	Amman	3 April	May met with King Abdullah II, in order to hold talks about refugees, security and the Middle East crisis. May announced a new UK–Jordan initiative to tackle terrorism, and develop new capabilities to strike Daesh. May also confirmed a plan to improve co-operation between the two nations in countering extremism in the region.	
18	Saudi Arabia	Riyadh	4–5 April	May held talks about counter terrorism, security, the Middle East crisis as well as future trade links. May met with the Saudi Minister of Energy to discuss energy policy, as well as investment opportunities on the London Stock Exchange. May also met with the Saudi Interior Minister to discuss terrorism and security. On 5 April, May met with King Salman of Saudi Arabia to discuss security and trade. May was honoured by King Salman with the Order of King Abdulaziz.	
19	Belgium	Brussels	25–26 May	May attended the NATO summit.	
19	Italy	Taormina	26–27 May	May attended the G7 summit She chaired a session on counter-terrorism.	
20	France	Paris, Saint-Denis	13 June	May met with President Emmanuel Macron in Paris. They also attended a football match between France and England.	
21	Belgium	Brussels	22–23 June	May attended the European Council summit.	
22	Germany	Berlin	29 June	May met with other European heads of state and government, as part of the preparations for the G20 summit.	
23	France	Strasbourg	1 July	May paid tribute to former German Chancellor Helmut Kohl at the European Parliament in Strasbourg.	
24	Germany	Hamburg	7–8 July	May attended the G20 summit.	
25	Belgium	Ypres	31 July	May attended the commemorations of the 100th anniversary of the Battle of Passchendaele.	
26	Japan	Tokyo	30 August – 1 September	May improved relations with the country and discuss a potential new UK-Japan trade agreement for the period after Brexit concludes. Her visit also involved discussions surrounding threats which North Korea's nuclear missile tests posed to Japan. She met with, among others, Japanese Prime Minister Shinzo Abe. and Emperor Akihito. During a joint press conference in Tokyo, Abe and May pledged agreement to a new economic deal between both Britain and Japan, as well as British and Japanese companies, which would in the future expand on the current EU-Japan deal following the completion of Brexit.	
27	Canada	Ottawa	18 September	May traveled to Canada on her first ever visit to the country to meet with Prime Minister Justin Trudeau to further deepen the strong bond between the two countries, where they discussed issues of mutual interest, including innovation, security, climate change, China, Islamaphobia, trade and advancing gender equality. May and Trudeau later held a joint press conference as well. May also showed solidarity with Canada and Bombardier over their dispute with Boeing as Bombardier have a factory in Northern Ireland and expressed optimism for Trudeau's promise of a "seamless" transition concerning British-Canadian trade relations following the completion of Brexit.	
27	United States	New York City	19–20 September	May attended the UN General Assembly alongside the foreign secretary, Boris Johnson, though it was later announced that Johnson's separate UN meeting was cancelled and that he would fly back with May. It will be the second speech May makes to the UN. After arriving in New York, May held a press conference about Brexit and her relationship with Johnson and also held a special meeting with President Trump's daughter Ivanka and United Nations Secretary General António Guterres. On September 20, May held a bilateral meeting on the sidelines of the UN General Assembly with Iranian President Hassan Rouhani and Rouhani announced that Iran was ready to expand ties to Britain in all fields, citing Britain's support of the Joint Comprehensive Plan of Action. She also attended a major UN Security Council meeting which saw the passage of a UN resolution on peacekeeping reforms and met with US Vice President Mike Pence. May would later address the UN General Assembly and warned tech firms to go "further and faster" in removing extremist content promoting terrorism, as well as other issues. She also met with US President Donald Trump on the General Assembly sidelines to discuss trade, security, defense and foreign relations between Britain and the United States of America.	
28	Italy	Florence	22 September	May gave a landmark speech on Brexit. She claimed to want a transitional period after Britain's exit from the EU, to allow time to discuss a trade deal, whilst still paying money into the EU budget. May also announced that the UK will "honour its [financial] commitments" so as to not make other EU countries pay more or receive less during the current EU budget period.	
29	Estonia	Tapa Army Base, Tallinn	28–29 September	May visited NATO's Tapa Base with President Kersti Kaljulaid and French President Emmanuel Macron and all displayed solidarity against Russia. She also attended a summit in the capital city of Tallinn and met with, among others, German Chancellor Angela Merkel. Downing Street said May and Merkel agreed on the need to settle the issue of EU citizens' rights quickly and that Merkel also hailed ‘good progress’ in latest Brexit talks as well.	
30	Belgium	Brussels	16 October	May attended a dinner meeting with the President of the European Commission Jean-Claude Juncker. During their meeting, May and Juncker agreed to "accelerate" Brexit talks.	
31	Belgium	Brussels	19–20 October	May attended the European Council summit on Brexit to discuss the rights of EU citizens, the United Kingdom's financial commitments and Northern Ireland's border with the Republic of Ireland.	
32	Sweden	Gothenburg	17 November	May attended the European Union summit on labour, jobs, social reform and economic growth across Europe, and met Donald Tusk and Swedish Prime Minister Stefan Löfven to discuss Brexit ahead of trade talks in December.	
33	Belgium	Brussels	24 November	May attended the European Council summit on the security of the Non-EU Eastern European countries Ukraine, Belarus, Georgia, Moldova, Armenia and Azerbaijan amid growing threats from Russia and to underline the United Kingdom's commitment to European security post Brexit.	
34	Saudi Arabia	Riyadh	28–29 November	May strengthened trade links between the two nations (Saudi Arabia being the United Kingdom's biggest trading partner in the Middle East) for the UK post-Brexit. She met with Crown Prince Mohammad bin Salman to discuss the humanitarian crisis in Yemen and to discuss Saudi Arabia's diplomatic crisis with Qatar.	
34	Iraq	Taji Military Base, Baghdad	29 November	May traveled from Saudi Arabia to Iraq transiting via Jordan to visit a coalition military base in Taji to meet British and Iraqi troops. Having been kept secret for security reasons, she arrived in an RAF Hercules C-130 aircraft with information for her visit not being released until she arrived in Iraq, being the first time she had entered a zone of conflict. It is also the first time a British leader has visited the country since Gordon Brown did so in 2008. May then flew to Baghdad to meet with Prime Minister Haider al-Abadi and promised to bolster the United Kingdom's efforts in helping fight against Islamic State by offering £10 million over three years to increase their counter-terrorism capabilities before flying back to Saudi Arabia.	
34	Jordan	Amman	30 November	May travelled from Saudi Arabia to Jordan and met with King Abdullah II and Prime Minister Hani Al-Mulki to discuss how the United Kingdom can support the economy of Jordan and to meet with members of the Arab Women's Enterprise Fund who have benefited from new jobs and opportunities. She will conclude her visit by addressing Jordanian parliamentarians, business leaders and media on economic reform in the country.	
35	Belgium	Brussels	4 December	May, accompanied by the Secretary of State for Exiting the European Union David Davis, met with the President of the European Commission Jean-Claude Juncker and President of the European Council Donald Tusk in Brussels "in a final attempt to smooth over a Brexit deal" before the EU Summit on trading relations post-Brexit on 14–15 December with the heads of governments from the other 27 member states. It was reported that the European Commission and the United Kingdom had reached a consensus on the guarantees of reciprocal citizens rights and the divorce bill, but was still yet to reach an agreement on the United Kingdom's border in Northern Ireland with the Republic of Ireland.	
36	Belgium	Brussels	8 December	May again travelled to Brussels, where the President of the European Commission President Jean-Claude Juncker announces a "breakthrough" Brexit deal had been reached following negotiations. The deal outlines agreements on issues such as: protecting the rights of Union citizens in the UK and British citizens in the Union; the framework for addressing the unique circumstances of Northern Ireland: and the financial settlements	
37	France	Paris	12 December	May attended the 'One Planet Summit' hosted by President Macron to mark the second anniversary of the signing of the Paris Agreement.	
38	Belgium	Brussels	14–15 December	May attended the first day of the European Council Summit.	
39	Poland	Warsaw	21 December	May signed a defence treaty with Poland.	
39	Akrotiri and Dhekelia	Akrotiri	22 December	May visited British troops at RAF Akrotiri.	

== 2018 ==
#	Country	Location	Date	Details	Image
40	Switzerland	Davos	25 January	May addressed and met with business leaders at the World Economic Forum in Davos. Met with the President Alain Berset.	
41	China	Wuhan, Beijing, Shanghai	31 January – 2 February	May pursued deals in China.	
42	Germany	Berlin, Munich	16–17 February	May held a meeting with Chancellor Angela Merkel and attended the annual Munich Security Conference.	
43	Belgium	Brussels	22–23 March	May attended the European Council summit. There she was preoccupied with responding to the Skripal poisoning.	
44	Denmark	Copenhagen	9 April	May met the Prime Minister Lars Løkke Rasmussen to discuss the Skripal poisoning, security cooperation, Britain's exit from the EU and bilateral trade.	
44	Sweden	Stockholm	9 April	May met the Prime Minister Stefan Löfven to discuss the Skripal poisoning, security cooperation, Britain's exit from the EU and bilateral trade.	
45	Bulgaria	Sofia	17 May	May met EU leaders in the Western-Balkans summit to discuss security, and the Irish Taoiseach Leo Varadkar to discuss the Irish border.	
45	Macedonia	Skopje	17–18 May	May became the first British Prime Minister to visit Macedonia in 20 years. She discussed post-Brexit trade with Macedonian Prime Minister Zoran Zaev.	
46	Canada	La Malbaie	7–9 June	May attended the G7 summit.	
47	Belgium	Brussels	28–29 June	May attended the European Council summit.	
48	Netherlands	The Hague	3 July	May met with Prime Minister Mark Rutte for continuing discussions on Britain's Departure from the European Union.	
49	Germany	Berlin	5 July	May held a meeting with Chancellor Angela Merkel.	
50	Belgium	Brussels	11–12 July	May attended the NATO summit.	
51	Austria	Salzburg	27 July	May met with Chancellor Sebastian Kurz and Czech Prime Minister Andrej Babis.	
52	France	Fort de Bregancon	2–3 August	May met with President Emmanuel Macron to discuss progression on the Brexit talks.	
53	France	Amiens	8 August	May attended commemoration services marking the Centenary of the Battle of Amiens.	
54	South Africa	Cape Town	28 August	May gave a keynote speech on trade and how British private sector investment can be brought into Africa. She also had a bilateral meeting with President Cyril Ramaphosa, she also visited the Robben Island Prison.	
54	Nigeria	Lagos	29 August	May met with the Nigerian government to discuss bilateral trade talks and strengthening the bond between the two countries.	
54	Kenya	Nairobi	30 August	May met with President Uhuru Kenyatta for talks on bilateral trade and announced plans to open a cyber security centre in Nairobi to combat human trafficking.	
55	Austria	Salzburg	19–20 September	Attended a working summit with EU leaders.	
56	United States	New York City	25–27 September	Attended the United Nations General Assembly and addressed US Businesses at the Bloomberg Business Forum.	
57	Belgium	Brussels	18–19 October	May attended the European Council summit.	
58	Norway	Oslo	30 October	May attended the Northern Future Forum and met with Norwegian Prime Minister Erna Solberg.	
59	Belgium	Saint-Symphorien	9 November	May attended commemoration services marking the Centenary of the end of World War I, laying a wreath at the first and last British soldiers to die during war at St Symphorien Military Cemetery.	
59	France	Thiepval	9 November	May attended commemoration services marking the Centenary of the end of World War I.	
60	Belgium	Brussels	21 November	May met with President of the European Commission Jean-Claude Juncker ahead of the European Council summit to discuss the Brexit negotiations.	
61	Belgium	Brussels	24–25 November	May attended an extraordinary European Council summit on Brexit following an agreement on the EU Withdrawal Agreement.	
62	Argentina	Buenos Aires	29 November – 1 December	May attended the G20 summit.	
63	Netherlands	The Hague	11 December	May held talks with Prime Minister Mark Rutte on the EU Withdrawal Agreement.	
63	Germany	Berlin	11 December	May held talks with Chancellor Angela Merkel on the EU Withdrawal Agreement.	
63	Belgium	Brussels	11 December	May held talks with President of the European Commission Jean-Claude Juncker and President of the European Council Donald Tusk on the EU Withdrawal Agreement.	
64	Belgium	Brussels	13–14 December	May attended the European Council summit.	

== 2019 ==
#	Country	Location	Date	Details	Image
65	Belgium	Brussels	7–8 February	May held Brexit talks with both President of the European Commission Jean-Claude Juncker and President of the European Council Donald Tusk.	
65	Ireland	Dublin	8 February	May held talks with Taoiseach Leo Varadkar concerning the proposed Irish backstop.	
66	Belgium	Brussels	20 February	May held Brexit talks President of the European Commission Jean-Claude Juncker	
67	Egypt	Sharm-el-Sheikh	24–25 February	Attended the first-ever Arab League-European Union summit. Held talks on Brexit with European Council President Donald Tusk. Also met with some Arab League and European Union leaders.	
68	France	Strasbourg	11–12 March	May held talks with President of the European Commission Jean-Claude Juncker to get last-minute further interpretation on the Northern Irish backstop in relation to the Brexit Withdrawal Agreement ahead of a second 'Meaningful Vote' in the House of Commons.	
69	Belgium	Brussels	21–22 March	May attended the European Council Summit where they approved an extension of the Article 50 negotiating period until April 12th.	
70	Germany	Berlin	9 April	May held talks with Chancellor Angela Merkel on the EU Withdrawal Agreement.	
70	France	Paris	9 April	May held talks with President Emmanuel Macron on the EU Withdrawal Agreement.	
70	Belgium	Brussels	10 April	May held talks with President of the European Council Donald Tusk and attended the European Council summit (Art.50) where the Article 50 process was extended until October 31, further delaying Brexit.	
71	France	Paris	15 May	May attended a conference on online hate speech hosted by President Emmanuel Macron and New Zealand Prime Minister Jacinda Ardern organised following the Christchurch attacks.	
72	Belgium	Brussels	28 May	May attended an EU Summit about the European election.	
73	France	Ver-sur-Mer	6 June	May attended the commendations of D-Day and opened the British Monument in Ver-sur-Mer with President Emmanuel Macron.	
74	Switzerland	Geneva	11 June	May attended the centenary of the International Labour Organization.	
75	Belgium	Brussels	20–21 June	May attended the European Council summit.	
76	Japan	Osaka	27–29 June	May attended the G20 summit.	
76	Belgium	Brussels	20 June – 2 July	May attended an extraordinary European Council summit.	
77	Poland	Poznań	4–5 July	May attended the 2019 Western Balkans Summit, Poznań	

== Multilateral meetings ==
Theresa May participated in the following summits during her premiership:

Group	Year			
Group	2016	2017	2018	2019
UN GA	19–20 September, (United States) New York City	19–20 September, (United States) New York City	25–27 September, (United States) New York City	
G7		26–27 May, (Italy) Taormina	8–9 June, (Canada) La Malbaie	
G20	4–5 September, (China) Hangzhou	7–8 July, (Germany) Hamburg	30 November – 1 December, (Argentina) Buenos Aires	28–29 June, (Japan) Osaka
NATO		25 May, (Belgium) Brussels	11–12 July, (Belgium) Brussels	
EU Summit	20–21 October, 15 December, (Belgium) Brussels	9–10 March, 22–23 June, 19–20 October, 14–15 December, (Belgium) Brussels	22–23 March, 28–29 June, 18–19 October, 13–14 December, (Belgium) Brussels	21–22 March, 20–21 June, (Belgium) Brussels
CHOGM	none	none	April 18–20, (United Kingdom) London	none

== See also ==
- Foreign relations of the United Kingdom
- List of international trips made by prime ministers of the United Kingdom
- List of state visits made by Elizabeth II
- List of Commonwealth visits made by Elizabeth II
