= List of international prime ministerial trips made by Tony Blair =

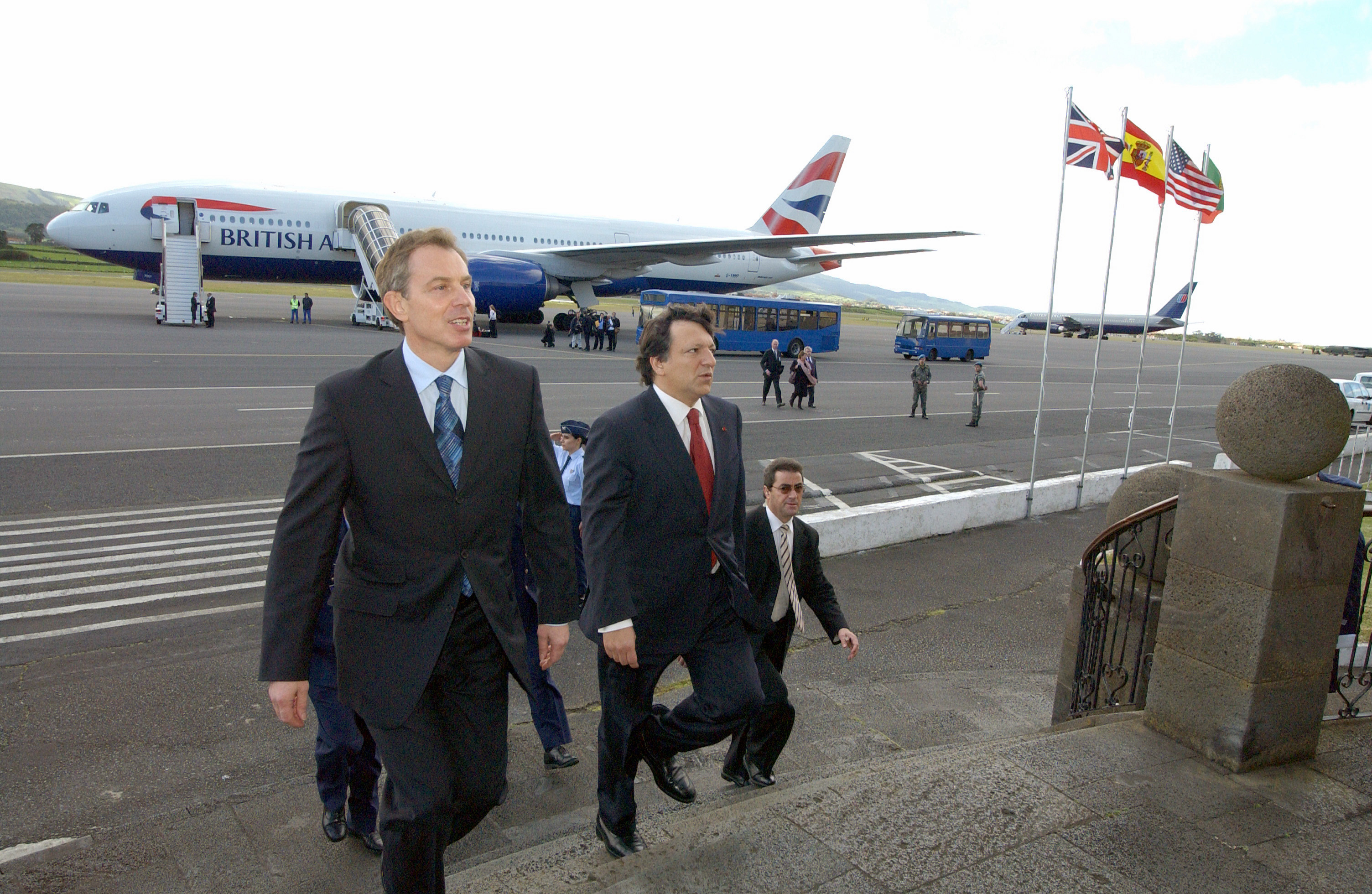
Prime Minister Tony Blair with Portuguese Prime Minister José Manuel Barroso, March 2003.

This is the list of international prime ministerial trips made by Tony Blair, who has served as Prime Minister of the United Kingdom from 2 May 1997 until 27 June 2007. Tony Blair made 208 trips to 68 countries during his premiership.

== Summary ==
The number of visits per country where Blair travelled are:

- One: Afghanistan, Albania, Argentina, Bangladesh, Barbados, Brazil, Bulgaria, Croatia, Ethiopia, Ghana, Hungary, Indonesia, Jamaica, Kosovo, Lebanon, Malta, Mexico, Mozambique, New Zealand, Oman, Romania, Senegal, Singapore, Slovakia, Sudan, Syria, and the United Arab Emirates.
- Two: Australia, Canada, Denmark, Libya, North Macedonia, Nigeria, Saudi Arabia, Sierra Leone, South Korea, and the Vatican City.
- Three: Austria, Bosnia and Herzegovina, China, the Czech Republic, Greece, Hong Kong, India, Japan, Kuwait, Pakistan, Poland, and Turkey.
- Four: Egypt, Finland, and Luxembourg.
- Five: Israel, Jordan, Palestine, Portugal, South Africa, and Switzerland.
- Six: the Netherlands and Sweden.
- Seven: Iraq and Ireland.
- Nine: Russia.
- Eleven: Spain.
- Sixteen: Italy.
- Twenty-two: Germany.
- Twenty-three: The United States.
- Twenty-seven: France.
- Thirty-one: Belgium.

== 1997 ==
#	Country/Territory	Location	Date	Details	Image
1	Netherlands	Noordwijk	23 May	Blair's first overseas trip as prime minister was to the Netherlands, where he attended his first European Council meeting.	
2	France	Paris	26–27 May	Blair attended a NATO–Russia summit, in which he signed the NATO–Russia Founding Act.	
3	Sweden	Malmö	6 June	Blair attended the European Socialist Congress.	
3	Germany	Bonn	6–7 June	Blair held a bilateral meeting with German Chancellor Helmut Kohl.	
4	France	Paris	11 June	Blair held a bilateral meeting with French President Jacques Chirac.	
5	Netherlands	Amsterdam	15–18 June	Blair attended a European Council meeting, which focused on drafting the Treaty of Amsterdam.	
6	United States	Denver, New York City	20–22 June	Blair attended the first G8 summit, he travelled to the event on Concorde. Following the G8 summit, Blair attended the United Nations Earth Summit at the United Nations Headquarters, including a meeting with US Vice President Al Gore.	
6	Hong Kong	Hong Kong Island	30 June–1 July	Blair attended the Hong Kong handover ceremony. Blair arrived in the British Dependent Territory of Hong Kong, but the sovereignty of the territory was transferred to China during the trip.	
6	Hong Kong	Hong Kong Island	30 June–1 July	Blair attended the Hong Kong handover ceremony. Blair arrived in the British Dependent Territory of Hong Kong, but the sovereignty of the territory was transferred to China during the trip.	
7	Spain	Madrid	7–9 July	Blair attended the 1997 NATO summit. Blair backed US President Bill Clinton's approach that NATO expansion should be capped at 3 countries.	
8	Italy	San Gimignano	2–26 August	Blair went on holiday with his wife Cherie Blair and children, staying with Geoffrey Robinson in Tuscany.	
8	France		2–26 August	Blair visited France for bilateral talks.	
9	Russia	Moscow	5–6 October	Blair met with Russian President Boris Yeltsin, he also signed an agreement on cooperating in the fight against organized crime with Russian Prime Minister Viktor Chernomyrdin.	
10	Luxembourg	Luxembourg City	9 October	Blair met with Luxembourgish Prime Minister Jean-Claude Juncker.	
10	France	Strasbourg	9–10 October	Blair attended a Council of Europe summit.	
11	Luxembourg	Luxembourg City	20–21 November	Blair attended a Jobs summit, with all European Union leaders.	
12	Bosnia and Herzegovina	Banja Luka, Sarajevo	28 November	In Banja Luka, Blair visited British troops serving in the Stabilisation Force in Bosnia and Herzegovina. Blair met with Republika Sprkpska President Biljana Plavšić, in which Blair offered British support meanwhile Plavšić provided her support for the Dayton Agreement. Blair travelled to Sarajevo for a meeting with Bosnian Chairman Alija Izetbegović, Croat Member of the Presidency of Bosnia and Herzegovina Krešimir Zubak, and Serb Member of the Presidency of Bosnia and Herzegovina Momčilo Krajišnik.	
13	Luxembourg	Luxembourg City	11–13 December	Blair attended a European Council summit, focusing on creating a European single currency, European Union enlargement to central and Eastern Europe, and issues surrounding Turkey's application to the European Union.	

== 1998 ==
#	Country/Territory	Location	Date	Details	Image
14	Japan	Tokyo	9–13 January	Blair held meetings with Japanese Prime Minister Ryutaro Hashimoto, and Japanese Emperor Akihito. Blair made a speech during the opening of the Festival UK98, a series of events promoting British culture among Japanese, at the British Embassy Tokyo. Japan offered Blair an apology for suffering of British prisoners during World War II.	
15	Netherlands	The Hague	20 January	Blair made a speech at the Ridderzaal.	
16	United States	Washington D.C.	4–7 February	Blair met with US president Clinton where the two emphasised the significance of the Special Relationship in United Kingdom–United States relations. Blair publicly supported President Clinton over the Lewinsky scandal.	
17	Germany	Bonn	20 March	Blair met with German chancellor Kohl, where the two discussed the European single currency, European Union expansion, and the outbreak of the Kosovo War. Later at the British Embassy in Bonn, Blair met with Social Democratic Party Leader Gerhard Schroeder.	
18	France	Paris	24 March	Blair made a speech to the French National Assembly.	
19	Spain	Doñana National Park, Córdoba	10–15 April	Blair met with Spanish Prime Minister José María Aznar in Doñana National Park. Blair and his family had a holiday in Andalusia.	
20	Egypt	Cairo	17–18 April	Blair met with Egyptian President Hosni Mubarak. Blair promoted British arms exports, attended the signing ceremony of a new energy deal with British Gas, and announced the creation of an Egyptian British Business Council.	
20	Saudi Arabia	Jeddah	18 April	Blair met Saudi Arabian King Abdullah to promote trade ties, and raise the case of two British nurses in jail on murder charges.	
20	Jordan	Amman	18–19 April	Blair met with Jordanian King Hussein to discuss peace talks on the Israeli–Palestinian conflict.	
20	Israel	Jerusalem	19–21 April	Blair visited the Yad Vashem museum and laid a wreath at the grave of an assassinated Israeli prime minister Yitzhak Rabin. Blair met with Israeli prime minister Benjamin Netanyahu.	
20	Palestine	Gaza	20 April	Blair met with Palestinian President Yasser Arafat, in which he discussed peace talks and announced closer cooperation in Palestine–European Union relations.	
21	Netherlands	The Hague	1 May	Blair made a speech for the 'Celebration of Labour Day'.	
21	Belgium	Brussels	1–2 May	Blair attended a European Council focused on appointing the first president of the European Central Bank.	
22	Switzerland	Geneva	19 May	Blair made a speech to the World Trade Organization on the 50th anniversary of the General Agreement on Tariffs and Trade.	
23	Spain	Madrid	1 June	Blair visited Madrid for the first stop on his Pre-European Council Tour running up to the Cardiff summit.	
23	Ireland	Dublin	1–2 June	Blair held meetings with Irish President Mary McAleese and Taoiseach Bertie Ahern, the latter being the first meeting between the two since the signing of the Good Friday Agreement. On the second day of the trip, Blair was invited by Ahern to address the Oireachtas.	
24	Netherlands	The Hague	4–5 June	Blair visited the Netherlands, Italy, and Austria during his Pre-European Council Tour running up to the Cardiff summit.	
24	Italy	Rome	4–5 June	Blair visited the Netherlands, Italy, and Austria during his Pre-European Council Tour running up to the Cardiff summit.	
24	Austria	Vienna	4–5 June	Blair visited the Netherlands, Italy, and Austria during his Pre-European Council Tour running up to the Cardiff summit.	
25	Sweden	Stockholm	8–9 June	Blair visited Sweden, Finland, Denmark, Belgium, Luxembourg, Germany, and France during the final leg of his Pre-European Council Tour running up to the Cardiff summit.	
25	Finland	Helsinki	8–9 June	Blair visited Sweden, Finland, Denmark, Belgium, Luxembourg, Germany, and France during the final leg of his Pre-European Council Tour running up to the Cardiff summit.	
25	Denmark	Copenhagen	8–9 June	Blair visited Sweden, Finland, Denmark, Belgium, Luxembourg, Germany, and France during the final leg of his Pre-European Council Tour running up to the Cardiff summit.	
25	Belgium	Brussels	8–9 June	Blair visited Sweden, Finland, Denmark, Belgium, Luxembourg, Germany, and France during the final leg of his Pre-European Council Tour running up to the Cardiff summit.	
25	Luxembourg	Luxembourg City	8–9 June	Blair visited Sweden, Finland, Denmark, Belgium, Luxembourg, Germany, and France during the final leg of his Pre-European Council Tour running up to the Cardiff summit.	
25	Germany	Bonn	8–9 June	Blair visited Sweden, Finland, Denmark, Belgium, Luxembourg, Germany, and France during the final leg of his Pre-European Council Tour running up to the Cardiff summit.	
25	France	Paris	8–9 June	Blair visited Sweden, Finland, Denmark, Belgium, Luxembourg, Germany, and France during the final leg of his Pre-European Council Tour running up to the Cardiff summit.	
26	France	Strasbourg	18 June	Blair made a speech to the European Council marking the end of the UK's presidency of the European Council.	
27	Germany	Frankfurt	30 June	Blair attended the inauguration ceremony for the European System of Central Banks, and the launch of the European Central Bank.	
28	Italy	Bologna	1 August	Blair met with Italian Prime Minister Romano Prodi at Bologna Guglielmo Marconi Airport.	
29	Italy	Florence	8 August	Blair met with Italian President Vannino Chiti.	
30	France	Cintegabelle	21 August	Blair met with French Prime Minister Lionel Jospin. The meeting occurred in the wake of Operation Infinite Reach.	
31	Ireland	Cong	26 August	Blair held a meeting with Taoiseach Ahern at Ashford Castle.	
32	United States	New York City	21 September	Blair addressed the United Nations General Assembly and the New York Stock Exchange; he later had a meeting with New York City Mayor Rudy Giuliani.	
33	China	Beijing, Shanghai	6–9 October	Blair travelled to boost Anglo-Chinese relations, where he received a welcoming ceremony in Tiananmen Square. Following the detention of Xu Wenli in Beijing, Blair stated that there was a "fundamental disagreement" between Britain and China over human rights. In Shanghai, Blair awarded the best Chinese midfield player prize to Fan Zhiyi, and accepted a personalised "Blair 1" shirt from Crystal Palace—who had recently bought two Chinese players.	
33	Hong Kong	Hong Kong Island, Kowloon	9–10 October	Blair aimed to use the trip to inspect the former British colony following its handover, though he received criticism from lawmakers in relation to his comments on human rights in China. Blair and his wife visited Chi Lin Nunnery.	
34	Austria	Pörtschach am Wörthersee	24–25 October	Blair attended an informal European Council summit. Blair pushed for greater European defence spending, and tilted in favour of divvying up the Western European Union between the European Union and NATO.	
35	Ireland	Dublin	25–26 November	Blair held a bilateral meeting with Taoiseach Ahern, and made a speech pushing for the implementation of the Good Friday Agreement to the Oireachtas. During the visit, Taoiseach Ahern raised the prospect of Ireland rejoining the Commonwealth, stating that it would "not be an unhealthy discussion" for Ireland.	
36	France	Saint-Malo	3–4 December	Blair attended an Anglo-French summit; Blair discussed harmonising European taxes with French president Chirac, and oversaw the signing of the Saint-Malo declaration.	
37	Austria	Vienna	10–12 December	Blair attended a European Council summit, which focused on European tax rates.	

== 1999 ==
#	Country/Territory	Location	Date	Details	Image
38	South Africa	Pretoria, Johannesburg, Cape Town	6–8 January	Upon arrival Blair's arrival faced protests from White South Africans seeking an apology for British usage of concentration camps during the Second Boer War, as well as Muslims protesting the 1998 bombing of Iraq; Blair announced that the UK would provide £100 million to a worldwide Aids programme. Blair met with South African Deputy President Thabo Mbeki, where the two discussed the Lockerbie bombing, Iraq, the future of Africa, and the location of the 2006 FIFA World Cup: of which both countries were bidding for. In Cape Town, Blair held a meeting with South African President Nelson Mandela, in which the two signed a trade agreement.	
38	Kuwait	Kuwait City	9 January	Blair visited UK troops and met with Kuwaiti officials.	
39	Jordan	Amman	7–8 February	Blair attended the state funeral of Hussein of Jordan.	
40	Russia	Saint Petersburg	25–26 February	Blair attended an informal heads of state meeting.	
41	Germany	Berlin	24–25 March	Blair attended a European Council meeting.	
42	Belgium	Brussels	14 April	Blair attended a European Council meeting.	
43	Belgium	Mons	20 April	Blair met with NATO Secretary General Javier Solana at the Supreme Headquarters Allied Powers Europe, where the two discussed the NATO bombing of Yugoslavia and its legitimacy.	
43	Germany	Elmpt	20 April	Blair visited RAF crews at RAF Bruggen, from where Tornado GR-1 bombers flew against Yugoslavia.	
44	United States	Washington, D.C, Chicago	21–25 April	Blair met with US president Clinton met at the White House, where the two discussed the Kosovo crisis. Following the meeting, Blair met with US senators on Capitol Hill. Blair attended the 1999 NATO summit. Blair became the first incumbent British prime minister to visit Chicago, where he made a speech to the Economic Club of Chicago, in which he unveiled an international doctrine in favour of interventionism.	
45	Macedonia	Skopje	3–4 May	Upon his arrival, Blair pledged to double British foreign aid to Kosovan refugees from £20m to £40m. Blair visited Stenkovic I Refugee camp, where he spoke with Kosovan refugees; he later visited a Kosovo border crossing.	
45	Romania	Bucharest	4 May	Blair became the first British prime minister to visit Romania in 25 years. Blair addressed the Romanian Parliament where stated he wanted the country "to be on a fast track to Nato membership" and that Romania had the UK's full backing.	
46	Germany	Geilenkirchen, Aachen	12–13 May	Blair received the Charlemagne Prize in the throne room of Aachen Town Hall.	
47	Bulgaria	Sofia	17–18 May	Blair made a speech to the Atlantic Club at Sofia University, in which he called for NATO ground troops to defeat Yugoslav President Slobodan Milošević's forces. Blair held meetings with Bulgarian Prime Minister Ivan Kostov, and later Bulgarian President Petar Stoyanov; Blair publicly and privately announced Britain's support for Bulgaria's accession to the European Union and NATO.	
47	Albania	Elbasan, Tirana	18 May	Blair visited a camp for Kosovo Albanian refugee camp in Elbasan. In Tirana, Blair held a meeting with Albanian Prime Minister Pandeli Majko.	
48	Germany	Cologne	2–4 June	Blair attended a European Council summit, which focused on the Kumanovo Agreement and Britains potential entry into the Eurozone.	
48	Netherlands	Rotterdam	4 June	Blair attended a Q&A session.	
49	Germany	Cologne	18–20 June	Blair attended the 1999 G8 summit.	
50	Bosnia and Herzegovina	Banja Luka, Sarajevo	30 July	Blair attended a Balkan stability pact summit.	
50	Macedonia	Skopje	30–31 July	Blair stayed overnight in Aleksandar Palace Hotel. Blair met with Macedonian Prime Minister Ljubčo Georgievski, where the two discussed future co-operation and support that the International Community could provide Macedonia.	
50	Kosovo	Pristina	30–31 July	Blair met with Allied Rapid Reaction Corps Commander General Sir Mike Jackson and the British representative in Pristina David Slinn; Blair later dined with United Nations Kosovo Administrator Bernard Kouchner. The following day, Blair met with Kosovo Liberation Army leader Hashim Thaci.	
51	Italy	Pisa, Florence	6–31 August	Blair and his family holidayed in Italy and France.	
51	France	Toulouse	6–31 August	Blair and his family holidayed in Italy and France.	
52	Finland	Tampere	14–16 October	Blair attended a European Council summit. On the sidelines of the summit, Blair held a meeting with French prime minister Lupin on France's continued ban on British beef in relation to the United Kingdom BSE outbreak.	
53	France	Paris	8 November	Blair attended a Socialist International conference. Blair held a meeting with Argentina President-elect Fernando de la Rúa for the first time.	
54	South Africa	Durban, George, Cape Town	11–14 November	Blair attended the 1999 Commonwealth Heads of Government Meeting. Blair's time at the summit heavily focused on tense United Kingdom–Zimbabwe relations.	
55	Italy	Florence	20–21 November	Blair attended an International Conference on Progressive Governance.	
56	Finland	Helsinki	9–10 December	Blair attended a European Council summit. During the summit, Blair discussed issues including the French ban on British Beef, European taxes, and the Second Chechen War.	

== 2000 ==
#	Country/Territory	Location	Date	Details	Image
57	Portugal	Lisbon	2–9 January	Blair and his family holidayed in Portugal. Blair held a meeting with Portuguese prime minister António Guterres, in which the two discussed preparations for the upcoming special European Union summit.	
58	Switzerland	Zurich, Davos	28 January	Blair attended the World Economic Forum annual meeting.	
59	Belgium	Ghent, Brussels	23 February	In Ghent, Blair made a speech on the UK's position within Europe. Blair met with the European Commission including Vice-President Neil Kinnock, and held a bilateral meeting with Belgian Prime Minister Guy Verhofstadt.	
60	Russia	Saint Petersburg	10–11 March	Blair became the first western leader to meet with Russian president Vladimir Putin since his election. Blair used his meeting with Putin to lobby for BP in relation to the bankruptcy of the Sidanko. Blair and Putin ended the trip by visiting the premiere of Sergei Prokofiev's War and Peace opera at the Mariinsky Theatre.	
61	Portugal	Lisbon	22–24 March	Blair attended a European Council summit.	
62	Portugal	Santa Maria da Feira	18–20 June	Blair attended a European Council summit, alongside Chancellor Gordon Brown and Foreign Secretary Robin Cook. The European Council agreed a deal on tax harmonisation; Blair claimed the agreement was "an extraordinary result" for the United Kingdom.	
63	Germany	Berlin	29–30 June	Blair held a bilateral meeting and had dinner with German chancellor Schroeder.	
64	Japan	Tokyo, Nago	19–23 July	Blair held a meeting with Japanese prime minister Yoshirō Mori, in which he lobbied for British Nuclear Fuels to win contracts for its Sellafield plant. In Tokyo, Blair met with Tim Blackman and pledged support for Blackman's campaign to find his missing daughter, Lucie Blackman. Blair attended the 2000 G8 summit.	
65	Italy	Florence	5–29 August	Blair holidayed in Italy and France.	
65	France	Toulouse	5–29 August	Blair holidayed in Italy and France.	
66	United States	New York City	5–8 September	Blair attended the Millennium Summit at the United Nations Headquarters.	
67	Poland	Warsaw	5–6 October	Blair made a speech at the Polish Stock Exchange.	
68	France	Biarritz	13 October	Blair attended a European Council summit, in which the leaders agreed upon the Charter of Fundamental Rights of the European Union.	
69	South Korea	Seoul	18–20 October	Blair attended the third Asia–Europe Meeting. The UK announced its intentions to establish diplomatic relations with North Korea.	
70	Spain	Madrid	27–28 October	Blair held a meeting with Spanish prime minister Aznou. The visit was overshadowed by safety fears and Spanish protests over a fault in the HMS Tireless's cooling system, the ship was docked in Gibraltar.	
71	Russia	Moscow	20–21 November	Blair met with Russian president Putin.	
72	Croatia	Zagreb	23–24 November	Blair held a meeting with Yugoslav President Vojislav Koštunica. Blair attended the first EU–Balkan summit.	
72	Bosnia and Herzegovina	Banja Luka	24 November	Blair met with British troops serving in the international stabilisation force.	
73	France	Nice	7–11 December	Blair attended a European Council summit, in which EU leaders drafted the Treaty of Nice.	

== 2001 ==
#	Country/Territory	Location	Date	Details	Image
74	Germany	Berlin	29 January	Blair held an informal dinner with German chancellor Schroeder.	
75	France	Cahors	9 February	Blair attended an Anglo–French summit; he and French president Chirac agreed an asylum agreement in relation to the Eurostar.	
76	Canada	Ottawa	22 February	Blair became the first British prime minister to visit Canada in 13 years. Blair addressed both the Canadian Parliament and Senate. Blair held a meeting with Canadian Prime Minister Jean Chretien focusing on defence matters and trade relations; Blair laid a wreath at the Tomb of the Unknown Soldier.	
76	United States	Washington, D.C.	22 February	Blair held his first meeting with recently inaugurated US president George W. Bush.	
77	Sweden	Stockholm	22–24 March	Blair attended a European Council summit. Blair's trip was primarily overshadowed by a foot-and-mouth outbreak in the United Kingdom, as well as speculation about the upcoming general election date.	
78	Belgium	Brussels	13 June	Blair attended the 2001 NATO special meeting.	
79	Sweden	Gothenburg	14–16 June	Blair attended a European Council summit, and an EU–US summit.	
80	Italy	Genoa	20–22 July	Blair attended the 2001 G8 summit.	
81	Jamaica	Kingston	29–30 July	Blair held a meeting with Jamaican Prime Minister P. J. Patterson, following which Blair announced Britain would provide £200,000 aid package to train Jamaican police. Blair attended the CARICOM–UK Summit.	
81	Brazil	Brasília, São Paulo, Foz do Iguaçu	30 July–2 August	Blair became the first incumbent British prime minister to visit Brazil. Blair used the trip to promote Brazil–United Kingdom relations, particularly in business and economic ties; Blair had lunch with Brazilian President Fernando Henrique Cardoso.	
81	Argentina	Puerto Iguazú	1 August	Blair became the first incumbent British prime minister to visit Argentina; he held a brief meeting with Argentine President de la Rúa.	
81	Mexico	Mexico City	2–4 August	Blair became the first incumbent British prime minister to visit Mexico; Blair held a meeting with Mexican President Vicente Fox, primarily focused on trade and investment, at the Mexican National Palace.	
82	Germany	Berlin	19 September	Blair began a tour of Western European countries to build a coalition to respond to the September 11 attacks. He met with German chancellor Schroeder, in which the two leaders expressed their countries' solidarity with the United States.	
82	France	Paris	19–20 September	Blair stayed the night in the British Embassy in Paris. Blair met with French president Chirac, in which the two leaders expressed their countries' support for the United States.	
82	United States	New York City, Washington, D.C.	20 September	Blair held a call with Iranian President Mohammad Khatami. Upon his arrival, Blair was greeted by New York City Mayor Rudy Giuliani; Blair, alongside Bill Clinton and United Nations Secretary General Kofi Annan, attended a memorial service for the British victims of the World Trade Centre attack. Blair then flew to Washington, D.C. for a dinner at the White House with US president Bush, and later attended a Congress meeting as a guest of honour, where he receives a standing ovation.	
82	Belgium	Brussels	21 September	Blair attended an emergency European Council summit.	
83	Russia	Moscow	4–5 October	Blair met with Russian president Putin.	
83	Pakistan	Islamabad	5 October	Blair held emergency talks with Pakistani President General Pervez Musharraf.	
83	India	New Delhi	5–6 October	Blair held coalition talks with Indian Prime Minister Atal Bihari Vajpayee.	
84	Switzerland	Geneva	9–10 October	Blair held a meeting with UAE President Zayed bin Sultan Al Nahyan.	
84	Oman	Muscat	10–11 October	Blair visited troops taking part in Exercise Saif Sareea 2.	
84	Egypt	Cairo	11 October	Blair held coalition talks with Egyptian President Hosni Mubarak, and held a phone call with Palestinian president Arafat.	
85	Belgium	Ghent	19 October	Blair joined a private E3 meeting with French president Chirac and German chancellor Schroeder, focusing on European tensions over the war on terror. Blair attended a European Council summit, in which European leaders reaffirmed "staunch support" for military action in Afghanistan and called for the elimination of the al-Qaeda.	
86	Syria	Damascus	31 October	Blair became the first incumbent British prime minister to visit Syria. Blair held a meeting with Syrian President Bashar al-Assad.	
86	Saudi Arabia	Riyadh	31 October–1 November	Blair held coalition talks with Saudi Arabia King Fahd and Crown Prince Abdullah.	
86	Jordan	Amman	1 November	Blair met with Jordanian King Abdullah II to discuss the war on terror and the Israeli–Palestinian conflict.	
86	Israel	Tel Aviv, Jerusalem	1 November	Blair held coalition talks with Israeli prime minister Ariel Sharon.	
86	Palestine	Gaza	1 November	Blair held coalition talks with Palestinian president Arafat.	
86	Italy	Genoa	1 November	Blair travelled to Genoa on route back from his Middle East tour.	
87	United States	Washington, D.C.	7–8 November	Blair held coalition talks with US president Bush.	
88	Germany	Nuremberg	20 November	Blair held a meeting with German chancellor Schroeder. Blair became the first British prime minister to make a speech to a Social Democratic Party conference.	
89	Ireland	Dublin	30 November	Blair attended the first British-Irish Council meeting.	
90	Belgium	Brussels	13–15 December	Blair attended a European Council summit in Laeken.	

== 2002 ==
#	Country/Territory	Location	Date	Details	Image
91	Bangladesh	Dhaka	3–4 January	Blair met with Bangladeshi Prime Minister Khaleda Zia, he and Cherie Blair later visited the village of West Kelia, near Savar, where the centre of a development programme run by the Bangladesh Rural Advancement Committee. Blair laid a wreath at the National Martyrs' Memorial, commemorating 3 million Bangladeshis who died during the Bangladesh Liberation War.	
91	India	Bangalore, Hyderabad, New Delhi	4–7 January	In Bangalore, Blair attended a dinner hosted by Karnataka Governor V. S. Ramadevi at the Raj Bhavan. Blair met with Indian prime minister Vajpayee at Hyderabad House where the two discussed the 2001–2002 India–Pakistan standoff and the war on terror; the two signed the New Delhi Declaration which promised that the two countries would closely cooperate in the fight against terrorism.	
91	Pakistan	Islamabad	7–8 January	Blair held a meeting with Pakistani president Musharraf, in which Blair requested that Pakistan crack down on Islamist militants.	
91	Afghanistan	Bagram	8 January	Blair became the first incumbent British prime minister to visit Afghanistan. Blair spent four hours visiting Bagram Airfield, in which Blair met with the Afghan Interim Administration Chairman Hamid Karzai.	
92	Nigeria	Abuja	6–7 February	Blair visited West Africa to consult African nations on a G8 recovery plan for the region. Blair held a meeting with Nigerian President Olusegun Obasanjo.	
92	Ghana	Accra, Teshie, Suhum	7–9 February	Blair became the first incumbent British prime minister to visit Ghana since Harold Macmillan in January 1960. Blair held a meeting with Ghanaian President John Kufuor at Osu Castle, in which the two leaders discusses the impact of the World Trade Organization on Ghana, and the G8 Africa recovery plan. During the trip, he addressed the Parliament of Ghana. Blair met with military officials and visited the Ghana Armed Forces Staff and Command College in Teshie, where he discussed UK support for African peacekeeping and presented a conflict resolution paper calling upon African countries to support the International Criminal Court by ratifying the Rome Statute; he also visited the Cocoa Research Institute of Ghana in Suhum before returning to Accra.	
92	Sierra Leone	Freetown	9 January	Blair spent 2 1/2 hours in Sierra leone, where he visited British troops shortly after the British military intervention in the Sierra Leone Civil War; Blair also met with the Sierra Leonean President Ahmad Tejan Kabbah.	
92	Senegal	Dakar	10 February	Blair became the first incumbent British prime minister to visit Senegal. Blair was welcomed at Dakar Airport by Senegalese President Abdoulaye Wade and Senegalese Prime Minister Mame Madior Boye; he later took part in a seminar looking at how to replicate the stability and economic success of Senegal.	
93	Italy	Rome	15 February	Blair attended an Anglo–Italian summit, in which he met with Italian prime minister Silvio Berlusconi. Blair and Berlusconi agreed in principle on a shared position for lifting regulations on European labour and energy markets.	
94	Sweden	Stockholm	22–23 February	Blair attended a Progressive Governance summit with 11 centre-left leaders including Swedish Prime Minister Göran Persson and New Zealand Prime Minister Helen Clark.	
95	Australia	Coolum Beach	2–5 March	Blair attended the 2002 Commonwealth Heads of Government Meeting. Blair primarily used the summit to call for the suspension of Zimbabwe from the Commonwealth of Nations.	
96	Spain	Barcelona	14–16 March	Blair attended a European Council summit. Blair primarily used the summit to push for free market liberalisation in the European Union economy, particularly in the energy sector.	
97	United States	Crawford	5–7 April	Blair visited US president Bush at Prairie Chapel Ranch for a private meeting. During the visit, Blair offered Bush a strategic partnership to confront Iraqi President Saddam Hussein, proposing a plan centred on issuing an ultimatum for Iraq to allow the return of UN weapons inspectors or face military consequences; Blair committed to supporting potential military action, contingent on pursuing a UN-backed process to build international legitimacy.	
98	Czech Republic	Prague	8 April	Blair held a meeting with Czech Prime Minister Miloš Zeman, in which Blair privately lobbied for the sale of 24 Saab–BAE JAS 39 Gripen fighter planes. During the visit, Blair stated that the Beneš decrees should not block the Czech Republic's entry to the European Union, as well as thanking Czech Republic for its role in the U.S.-led war against terrorism.	
99	Germany	Berlin	12 May	Blair met with German chancellor Schroeder, where the two discussed situation in the Middle East, the War in Afghanistan, the war on terror, and the far right in Europe particularly in relation to the performance of Jean-Marie Le Pen in the 2002 French presidential election.	
100	Spain	Madrid	12 May	Blair attended the 2nd European Union, Latin America and the Caribbean Summit.	
101	Italy	Rome	28 May	Blair attended the 2002 Rome NATO–Russia summit.	
102	France	Paris	19 June	Blair held a meeting with French president Chirac.	
103	Spain	Seville	20–22 June	Blair attended a European Council summit.	
104	Canada	Kananaskis	25–28 June	Blair attended the 2002 G8 summit. Blair publicly dismissed US president Bush's Road map for peace to resolve the Israeli–Palestinian conflict which included plans to remove Palestinian president Arafat, insisting that it was up to the Palestinians to elect their own leaders. Blair primarily used the summit to conclude the G8 Africa recovery plan.	
105	Mozambique	Maputo, Beira	31 August–2 September	Blair visited Mozambique ten years after the Mozambican Civil War. Blair visited a hospital in northern Mozambique that treated people suffering from malaria and AIDs.	
105	South Africa	Johannesburg	2 September	Blair attended the World Summit on Sustainable Development, where he rebuked countries that had failed to sign the Kyoto Protocol.	
106	Sweden	Stockholm	4 September	Blair held a bilateral meeting with Swedish prime minister Persson; Blair also discussed plans to release the September Dossier with the media.	
107	Spain	Madrid	5 September	Blair attended the wedding of Spanish prime minister Aznar's daughter Ana Aznar.	
108	United States	Camp David	7 September	Blair held a bilateral meeting with US president Bush, in which Blair fully endorsed Bush's Rationale for the Iraq War.	
109	Russia	Moscow	10–11 October	Blair held a bilateral meeting with Russian president Putin, in which Blair tried to convince Putin to hold a tough stance against Hussein's Iraq while addressing Russia's concerns of losing billions of dollars in export revenues caused by oil market instability.	
110	Belgium	Brussels	24–25 October	Blair attended a European Council summit. Blair primarily used the summit to argue for reduced EU spending on the Common Agricultural Policy.	
111	Poland	Warsaw	15 November	Blair attended a meeting of European socialist leaders.	
112	Czech Republic	Prague	20–22 November	Blair attended the 2002 Prague NATO summit.	
113	Denmark	Copenhagen	12–13 December	Blair attended a European Council summit which focused on EU enlargement, including the conclusion of negotiations for the 2004 enlargement. Blair heavily advocated for the accession of Turkey to the European Union, in addition to Bulgaria and Romania.	

== 2003 ==
#	Country/Territory	Location	Date	Details	Image
114	Germany	Hanover	11 January	Blair held a meeting with German chancellor Schroeder, primarily focused on the possible invasion of Iraq of which the two had conflicting views.	
115	Spain	Madrid	30 January	Blair held a meeting with Spanish prime minister Aznar, primarily focused on the possible invasion of Iraq of which both leaders supported.	
115	United States	Washington, D.C.	30 January–1 February	Blair met with US president Bush, where the two discussed the possibility of military action against Hussein's regime, rallying international support, the legality of potential military action, and Blair advocating for a UNSC resolution to boost legitimacy. The trip was also significant for the later leaked Bush–Blair 2003 Iraq memo, which revealed that the two leaders were already planning the 2003 invasion of Iraq regardless of international legality and legitimacy.	
116	France	Le Touquet	4 February	Blair attended an Anglo–French summit with Home Secretary David Blunkett, Defence Secretary Geoff Hoon, and Foreign Secretary Jack Straw; Blair and French president Chirac signed bilateral agreements relating to asylum and immigration, education, and defence. On the Iraq War, Chirac resisted Blair's appeals to soften French opposition. Both leaders suggest that Colin Powell's presentation to the United Nations Security Council could influence their nation's final decisions.	
117	Belgium	Brussels	17 February	Blair attended a European Council summit, focused on securing common ground between EU leaders on the Iraq War. The search for common ground was primarily undermined by the vastly different stances of Blair and French president Chirac.	
118	Italy	Rome	21–22 February	Blair attended an Anglo–Italian summit, in which he met with Italian prime minister Berlusconi discussed the ongoing Iraq situation.	
118	Vatican City		22 February	Blair became the first British prime minister in over 30 years to hold an audience with a Pope. Blair and Pope John Paul II discussed the Iraq situation, with the Pope urging Blair to avoid war, emphasising peace and diplomatic solutions amid widespread concern about military conflict; he meeting was discreet and framed as a private dialogue on international peace and the implications of the Iraq conflict.	
118	Portugal	Lajes Field	16 March	Blair attended the Azores Summit, where he met with Portuguese Barroso, US president Bush, and Spanish prime minister Aznar. The pro-Iraq war meeting was historically significant as it occurring just four days before the invasion of Iraq.	
119	Belgium	Brussels	20–21 March	Blair attended a European Council summit.	
120	United States	Camp David, New York City	26–27 March	Blair met with US president Bush at Camp David, where the two discussed the progress of the Iraq War and post-war plans, emphasising the need for humanitarian relief, reconstruction, and building democratic institutions in Iraq. In New York City, Blair held a meeting with UN secretary general Kofi Annan.	
122	Germany	Hanover	15 April	Blair met German chancellor Schroeder, in which the two discussed Germany's role in rebuilding Iraq, emphasising cooperation on post-war reconstruction under the United Nations' leadership despite prior disagreements over the Iraq war.	
122	Greece	Athens	15–16 April	Blair attended a European Council summit, focused on Iraq, the Middle East, and EU expansion, including an unplanned meeting with French president Chirac. Blair defended the Iraq war amid large protests and emphasised the need for rapid reconstruction efforts under a UN-led framework. The summit also included historic EU enlargement treaty signings by 10 new member states; Blair called for a full-time EU President to oversee the expansion of the EU.	
123	Russia	Moscow	29 April	Blair held a meeting with Russian president Putin at the Russian presidential residence at Novo-Ogaryovo, where the two discussed the future of Iraq, UNSC Resolution 1483, and Russia's opposition to the proposed UNSC Resolution.	
124	Ireland	Dublin	6 May	Blair held a bilateral meeting with Taoiseach Bertie Ahern, focused on developments in the Northern Ireland peace process and implementation of the Good Friday Agreement. Prior to the visit, a pipe bomb was found in Merrion Square, Dublin.	
125	Germany	Berlin	22 May	Blair attended the 140th anniversary celebration of German Social Democracy alongside German chancellor Schröder; Blair's role was to politically support Schröder amid internal opposition to his proposed Agenda 2010 welfare and market reforms. During the visit, Blair welcomed the vote on UNSC Resolution 1483 which lifted Iraqi sanctions, describing the vote as good news for the Iraqi people and the broader global community.	
126	Kuwait	Kuwait City	28–29 May	Blair for an official reception and brief meetings with Kuwaiti Crown Prince and Prime Minister Sabah Al-Ahmad Al-Jaber Al-Sabah and other Kuwaiti officials to thank them for their support in the Iraq war.	
126	Iraq	Basra, Umm Qasr	29 May	Blair became the first Western leader to visit Iraq since beginning of the war and the toppling of the Saddam regime. During the trip, Blair met with British troops in Basra and Umm Qasr, visited an Iraqi school, and met with notable US and UK officials, including Coalition Administaror Paul Bremer and British Special Representative John Sawers.	
126	Poland	Warsaw	30 May	Blair publicly backed Poland's accession to the European Union, and called on Polish voters to back the 2003 Polish European Union membership referendum.	
126	Russia	Saint Petersburg	30–31 May	Blair held a meeting with Russian president Putin, where the two discussed Iraq's post-war settlement, agreeing on a three-stage process involving coalition reconstruction, cooperation on global security, counterterrorism, and weapons of mass destruction; Blair announced Putin's upcoming state visit to Britain, the first since the 1870s. Blair attended the Russia–European Union summit.	
126	France	Évian-les-Bains	1–3 June	Blair attended the 2003 G8 summit.	
127	France	Paris	11–12 June	Blair held a meeting with French president Chirac at Élysée Palace; the two discussed a potential European Union Constitution and the postwar Iraq, as well as condemning the Davidka Square bus bombing in Jerusalem.	
128	Greece	Thessaloniki	20–21 June	Blair attended a European Council summit in Porto Carras; the summit was the final European Council meeting not to be held in Brussels. The summit focused primarily on a proposed EU constitution, of which Blair Blair opposed proposals for greater European integration, including tax, foreign, defence policy, and border control.	
129	United States	Washington, D.C.	16–17 July	Blair's trip was intended as a celebration of the US-UK alliance in the Iraq war but was overshadowed by public and media backlash from the absence of weapons of mass destruction in Iraq. Blair became the fourth British prime minister to stand in the rostrum of the House of Representatives, where he primarily spoke about the justification of the Iraq War.	
129	Japan	Tokyo, Hakone	18–20 July	In Tokyo, Blair opened a pizza restaurant, made a speech on inward investment and the euro, and held talks with Japanese business leaders. In Hakone, Blair met with Japanese prime minister Junichiro Koizumi.	
129	South Korea	Seoul	20 July	Blair held a meeting with South Korean President Roh Moo-hyun, the two discussed North Korea's nuclear weapons ambitions and British business interests in the region.	
129	China	Beijing, Shanghai	20–22 July	Upon arrival in Beijing, Blair was greeted by Chinese Vice Foreign Minister Zhang Yesui. The following day, accompanied by Chinese Premier Wen Jiabao, Blair was formally welcomed with a 19-gun salute and a military guard of honour at the Great Hall of the People in Tiananmen Square. In Shanghai, Blair met with Shanghai Mayor Han Zheng; the two visited the Bund.	
129	Hong Kong	Hong Kong Island	22–24 July	Blair held a meeting with Hong Kong Chief Executive Tung Chee-hwa, and Hong Kong business leaders.	
130	Germany	Berlin	20 September	Blair attended an E3 meeting with German chancellor and French president Chirac, the three primarily discussed the Iraq War while Blair lobbied for French and German support for the upcoming vote on UNSC Resolubtion 1511.	
131	Italy	Rome	3–5 October	Blair attended an Inter-Governmental Conference with EU leaders and EU applicant country leaders; the summit launched negotiations to revise the European Union treaties and to discuss a proposed European constitution.	
132	Belgium	Brussels	16–17 October	Blair attended a European Council summit, in which EU leaders primarily discussed a proposed European constitution and ideas for autonomous EU defence capabilities.	
133	Nigeria	Abuja	4–7 December	Blair attended the 2003 Commonwealth Heads of Government Meeting; during the summit, Blair received backlash for rejecting calls to lift Zimbabwe's suspended membership.	
134	Belgium	Brussels	11–13 December	Blair attended a European Council summit, discussions included EU member rights post expansion and post-war Iraq reconstruction.	

== 2004 ==
#	Country/Territory	Location	Date	Details	Image
135	Iraq	Basra, Az Zubayr	4 January	Blair visited Iraq where he made a speech thanking 600 representatives of the 10,000 British troops and personnel stationed in Basra. Blair visited a new police academy in Az Zubayr, where he observed the training of Iraqi officers by British police and military personnel from Britain, Denmark, the Czech Republic, and Italy, later he met with Basra Governor Wael Abdul Latif, at Basra Palace.	
135	Jordan	Amman	4 January	Blair held a bilateral meeting with Jordanian King Abdullah II in which the two discussed the Middle East peace process, the situation in Iraq, and the need to combat violence in Palestinian territories.	
136	Belgium	Brussels	4 January	Blair held a bilateral meeting with Belgian prime minister Verhofstadt.	
137	Germany	Berlin	12 February	Blair held a bilateral meeting with German chancellor Schroeder in which the two discussed German military reforms, as well as the wars in Afghanistan and Iraq.	
138	Germany	Berlin	18 February	Blair attended an E3 meeting with German chancellor Schroeder and French president Chirac, the three primarily discussed the upcoming enlargement of the European Union.	
139	Italy	Rome	4 March	Blair met with Italian prime minister Berlusconi at Chigi Palace, where the two discussed the Iraq war, the 2004 Ashura massacre, as well as calling for economic reform for the European Union. The trip was also made to repair Italy–United Kingdom relations following Italian backlash from Italy's exclusion from the E3 meeting the prior month.	
140	Ireland	Dublin	11 March	Blair met with Taoiseach Ahern, the two primarily discussed Sinn Féin's inclusion in the Northern Ireland political process.	
141	Spain	Madrid	24 March	Blair held his inaugural meeting with Spanish prime minister José Luis Rodríguez Zapatero in which they primarily discussed Zapatero's opposition to the Iraq war and its implications on Spain's future involvement. Blair attended a memorial service for the 2004 Madrid train bombings at Almudena Cathedral, alongside Prince Charles and other world leaders.	
141	Portugal	Lisbon	24–25 March	Blair held a bilateral meeting Portuguese prime minister Barroso in which the two primarily discussed the Iraq war.	
141	Libya	Tripoli	25 March	Blair became the first incumbent British prime minister to visit Libya post-independence. The trip marked an economic reset in Libya–United Kingdom relations with British company Shell plc signed an oil and gas partnership with Libya's National Oil Corporation, as well as BAE Systems confirming talks for deals with Libya over Libyan airport upgrades and commercial aircraft sales. The trip was designed as a reward for Libyan Leader Muammar Gaddafi agreeing to dismantle Libya's weapons of mass destruction programs and condemn terrorism.	
141	Belgium	Brussels	25–26 March	Blair attended a European Council summit in which he primarily pushed for the adoption of a proposed European constitution.	
142	United States	New York City, Washington, D.C.	15–16 April	Blair met with UN secretary general Annan where they discussed Iraq's political transition and the need for a new UN Security Council resolution. Blair later met with US president Bush where the two discussed Iraq's new unity government and Blair's opposition to Israeli prime minister Ariel Sharon's Israeli disengagement from the Gaza Strip plan.	
143	Ireland	Dublin	1–2 May	Blair attended the EU Enlargement Welcome Day Ceremony. Blair held a bilateral meeting with Taoiseach Ahern to restart the peace process in Northern Ireland.	
144	France	Paris	9 May	Blair attended a Europe Day Event. Blair held talks with French president Chirac and Prime Minister Raffarin over the Iraq war and changes to the proposed European Constitution. During the trip, Blair announced he would call a referendum on the European Constitution.	
145	Turkey	Ankara	17 May	Blair became the first British prime minister to visit Turkey in 14 years. Blair held meetings with Turkish President Ahmet Necdet Sezer and Turkish Prime Minister Recep Tayyip Erdogan in which the leaders discussed the Cyprus problem, the Iraq war, and the upcoming NATO summit hosted in Turkey, while Blair publicly backed the accession of Turkey to the European Union. During the visit, Blair praised UN secretary general Annan's Cyprus reunification plan. Blair signed a security cooperation between Turkey and the United Kingdom to combat Islamic terrorism.	
146	France	Bayeux, Caen, Arromanches-les-Bains	6 June	Blair attended the 60th Anniversary of Normandy Landings. Blair Blair visited the Commonwealth War Graves Cemetery in Bayeux, where he participated in a joint British-French service alongside Queen Elizabeth II and French president Chirac. Blair traveled to Caen, where he attended a lunch with multinational leaders at the Town Hall. Blair participated in the Normandy international ceremony at Arromanches, where he stood alongside Queen Elizabth II and representatives from 17 nations.ge W. Bush.	
147	United States	Sea Island, Washington, D.C.	8–11 June	Blair attended the 2004 G8 summit. On the final day of the trip, Blair attended the state funeral of Ronald Reagan.	
148	Belgium	Brussels	17–18 June	Blair attended a European Council meeting. The meeting was notable for the drafting of the Treaty establishing a Constitution for Europe.	
149	Turkey	Istanbul	27–29 June	Blair attended the 2004 Istanbul NATO summit.	
149	Belgium	Brussels	29 June	Blair attended a European Council meeting.	
150	Greece	Athens	12–14 August	Blair attended the 2004 Summer Olympics, including the opening ceremony.	
151	Sudan	Khartoum	6–7 October	Blair became the first incumbent British prime minister to visit Sudan post-independence. Blair met with Sudanese President Omar al-Bashir in Khartoum to discuss the Darfur crisis where the two agreed to a five-point peace plan. Blair set a deadline for the completion of a comprehensive peace deal by the end of 2004.	
151	Ethiopia	Addis Ababa	7–8 October	Blair attended a meeting of the Commission for Africa.	
152	Hungary	Budapest	14–15 October	Blair attended a Progressive Governance summit. Blair held bilateral talks with Hungarian Prime Minister Ferenc Gyurcsány, which included writing a joint article for a Hungarian newspaper on the equality of status between established European Union members and newer member states.	
153	Italy	Rome	29 October	Blair attended a ceremony at the Palazzo dei Conservatori in Capitoline Hill where he signed the Treaty establishing a Constitution for Europe.	
154	Belgium	Brussels	4–5 November	Blair attended a European Council meeting.	
155	United States	Washington, D.C.	11–12 November	Blair met with US president Bush where the two discussed Iraq, the war on terror, and reaffirmed their alliance. The centrepiece of the visit was issuing a formal UK-US Joint Statement on the Middle East Peace Process that outlined a five-point plan to advance Israeli-Palestinian peace, including support for Palestinian elections and endorsement of Sharon's Gaza disengagement plan.	
156	Belgium	Brussels	16–17 December	Blair attended a European Council meeting.	
157	Iraq	Baghdad, Basra	20–21 December	Blair met with Iraqi Interim Prime Minister Ayad Allawi and Iraqi election officials, praising them as "heroes" for conducting the upcoming January 2005 national elections.	
157	Israel	Jerusalem	21–22 December	Blair met with Israeli prime minister Ariel Sharon; the two discussed Sharon's planned Gaza withdrawal and pressed both sides to coordinate whilst urging Sharon to facilitate Palestinian electoral freedom by withdrawing troops from Palestinian cities.	
157	Palestine	Ramallah	22 December	Blair met with Mahmoud Abbas and Palestinian leaders at the Muqata compound, where he paid respects at Yasser Arafat's tomb.	
158	Egypt	Sharm El Sheikh	26 December–3 January	Blair held a bilateral meeting with Egyptian President Hosni Mubarak, during which the two discussed the ongoing situations on Palestine, Iraq, and Darfur. Blair holidayed in the Sharm El Sheikh Red Sea resort with his family.	
158	Jordan	Aqaba	29 December	Blair visited Jordan directly from his holiday in Egypt. Blair held bilateral talks and a dinner with Jordan King Abdullah II at Raghadan Palace.	

== 2005 ==
#	Country/Territory	Location	Date	Details	Image
159	France	Toulouse	18 January	Blair attended the launch ceremony of Airbus A380 alongside French president Chirac and German chancellor Schroeder.	
160	Switzerland	Davos	26–27 January	Blair attended the 2005 World Economic Forum meeting. Blair, alongside Bono and Bill Gates, called for investment into Africa to tackle poverty as part of their African Commission; Blair announced that Britain would be contributing a further £45m towards provision of mosquito nets.	
161	Belgium	Brussels	21–22 February	Blair had a working breakfast with US president Bush before later attending the 2005 Brussels NATO summit. The following day, Blair attended a European Council meeting.	
162	Belgium	Brussels	22–23 March	Blair attended a European Council meeting.	
163	Vatican City		7–8 April	Blair attended the Death and funeral of Pope John Paul II.	
164	Italy	Rome	27 May	Blair met with Italian prime minister Berlusconi to discuss plans for the upcoming 2005 G8 summit particularly relating to increasing aid to Africa and tackling climate change.	
165	United States	Washington, D.C.	6–8 June	Blair met with US president Bush to discuss plans for the upcoming G8 summit particularly relating to American investment in Africa.	
166	France	Paris	14 June	Blair held a bilateral meeting with French president Chirac, in which the two discussed the European Union budget and the Common Agricultural Policy ahead of the European Council summit.	
167	Belgium	Brussels	16–17 June	Blair attended a European Council summit, which collapsed without agreement on the EU budget following a dispute over the British rebate.	
168	Belgium	Brussels	23 June	Blair addressed the European Parliament to set out the priorities of the UK's upcoming presidency of the Council of the European Union.	
169	Singapore	Singapore	3–6 July	Blair attended the 117th International Olympic Committee Session to lobby for London's bid to host the 2012 Summer Olympics.	
170	China	Beijing	4–6 September	Blair held meetings with Chinese president Hu Jintao and Chinese premier Wen Jiabao, and attended the EU–China summit.	
170	India	New Delhi	6–8 September	Blair held a bilateral meeting with Indian prime minister Manmohan Singh.	
171	United States	New York City	13–15 September	Blair attended the 2005 World Summit at the United Nations Headquarters.	
172	France	Paris	26 October	Blair held a meeting with French president Chirac ahead of the informal European Council summit at Hampton Court Palace.	
173	Malta	Valletta	24–27 November	Blair attended the 2005 Commonwealth Heads of Government Meeting.	
173	Spain	Barcelona	27–28 November	Blair attended the Euro-Mediterranean summit marking the tenth anniversary of the Barcelona Process.	
174	Belgium	Brussels	15–16 December	Blair attended a European Council summit, in which EU leaders agreed the 2007–2013 EU budget after Blair agreed to a reduction of the British rebate.	
175	France	Paris	20 December	Blair held a meeting with French president Chirac.	
176	Kuwait	Kuwait City	22 December	Blair visited Kuwait before travelling on to Iraq.	
176	Iraq	Baghdad, Basra	22 December	Blair made a surprise visit to Iraq following the December 2005 parliamentary election, where he met with British troops and Iraqi leaders.	

== 2006 ==
#	Country/Territory	Location	Date	Details	Image
177	South Africa	Johannesburg	11–12 February	Blair attended a Progressive Governance summit hosted by South African president Thabo Mbeki.	
178	Slovakia	Bratislava	9–10 March	Blair became the first serving British prime minister to visit Slovakia.	
179	Czech Republic	Prague	10 March	Blair met with Czech prime minister Jiří Paroubek and attended a meeting of European socialist leaders.	
180	Belgium	Brussels	16 March	Blair visited Brussels.	
181	Belgium	Brussels	23–24 March	Blair attended a European Council summit.	
182	Australia	Melbourne	25–28 March	Blair visited Australia, where he held talks with Australian prime minister John Howard.	
183	New Zealand	Wellington	28–29 March	Blair met with New Zealand prime minister Helen Clark and was greeted by anti-war protesters.	
184	Indonesia	Jakarta	29–30 March	Blair held talks with Indonesian president Susilo Bambang Yudhoyono.	
185	Iraq	Baghdad	22 May	Blair made a surprise visit to Iraq, where he met the leaders of Iraq's new government.	
186	United States	Washington, D.C.	25–26 May	Blair met with US president Bush at the White House.	
187	Belgium	Brussels	15–16 June	Blair attended a European Council summit.	
188	Russia	Saint Petersburg	15–17 July	Blair attended the 2006 G8 summit. A private conversation between Blair and Bush was picked up by an open microphone.	
189	United States	Washington, D.C., Los Angeles	28 July–2 August	Blair met with US president Bush, then travelled to California, where he agreed a climate change partnership with California Governor Arnold Schwarzenegger.	
190	Barbados	Bridgetown	8–25 August	Blair holidayed in Barbados during the 2006 Lebanon War.	
191	Israel	Jerusalem	9 September	Blair held talks with Israeli prime minister Ehud Olmert.	
191	Palestine	Ramallah	10 September	Blair met with Palestinian president Mahmoud Abbas.	
191	Lebanon	Beirut	11 September	Blair met with Lebanese prime minister Fouad Siniora following the 2006 Lebanon War.	
192	Finland	Helsinki	20 October	Blair attended the EU–Russia summit, where he met with Russian president Putin.	
193	Pakistan	Islamabad	19 November	Blair held a meeting with Pakistani president Musharraf.	
194	United States	Washington, D.C.	6–7 December	Blair met with US president Bush, where the two discussed Iraq following the publication of the Iraq Study Group report.	
195	Belgium	Brussels	14–15 December	Blair attended a European Council summit.	
196	Turkey	Ankara	15–16 December	Blair visited Turkey as the first stop of a Middle East tour.	
196	Egypt	Cairo	16 December	Blair held talks with Egyptian president Mubarak.	
196	Iraq	Baghdad, Basra	17 December	Blair visited Iraq.	
196	Israel; Palestine	Jerusalem, Ramallah	18 December	Blair held talks with Israeli prime minister Olmert and Palestinian president Abbas.	
196	United Arab Emirates	Abu Dhabi, Dubai	19–20 December	Blair visited the United Arab Emirates as the final stop of his Middle East tour.	
197	United States	Miami	26 December	Blair travelled to Miami, Florida for a holiday.	

== 2007 ==
#	Country/Territory	Location	Date	Details	Image
198	Switzerland	Davos	26–27 January	Blair attended the 2007 World Economic Forum annual meeting.	
199	Belgium	Brussels	8–9 March	Blair attended a European Council summit, in which EU leaders agreed on binding climate change and renewable energy targets.	
200	Germany	Berlin	24–25 March	Blair attended the celebrations of the 50th anniversary of the Treaty of Rome, where leaders signed the Berlin Declaration.	
201	France	Paris	11 May	Blair visited Paris.	
202	United States	Washington, D.C.	16–17 May	Blair held his final meeting with US president Bush at the White House as Prime Minister.	
203	Iraq	Baghdad, Basra	19 May	Blair made his final visit to Iraq as Prime Minister.	
204	Libya	Tripoli, Sirte	29 May	Blair met with Libyan leader Muammar Gaddafi.	
205	Sierra Leone	Mahera, Freetown	30 May	Blair visited Sierra Leone as part of his farewell tour of Africa.	
206	South Africa	Pretoria, Johannesburg	31 May–1 June	Blair met with South African president Mbeki.	
207	Germany	Heiligendamm	6–8 June	Blair attended the 2007 G8 summit.	
208	Belgium	Brussels	21–23 June	Blair attended a European Council summit, his final trip abroad as prime minister.	

== Multilateral meetings ==
Blair attended the following regular summits during his premiership:

Group	Year										
Group	1997	1998	1999	2000	2001	2002	2003	2004	2005	2006	2007
G8	20–22 June, (United States) Denver	15–17 May, (United Kingdom) Birmingham	18–20 June, (Germany) Cologne	21–23 July, Nago	20–22 July, (Italy) Genoa	26–27 June, (Canada) Kananaskis	1–3 June, Évian-les-Bains	8–10 June, (United States) Sea Island	6–8 July, (United Kingdom) Auchterarder	15–17 July, (Russia) Saint Petersburg	6–8 June, (Germany) Heiligendamm
NATO	8–9 July, (Spain) Madrid	none	24–25 April, (United States) Washington, D.C.	none	13 June, (Belgium) Brussels	28 May, (Italy) Rome	none	28–29 June, (Turkey) Istanbul	22 February, (Belgium) Brussels	28–29 November, (Latvia) Riga	none
NATO	8–9 July, (Spain) Madrid	none	24–25 April, (United States) Washington, D.C.	none	13 June, (Belgium) Brussels	21–22 November, (Czech Republic) Prague	none	28–29 June, (Turkey) Istanbul	22 February, (Belgium) Brussels	28–29 November, (Latvia) Riga	none
CHOGM	24–27 October, (United Kingdom) Edinburgh	none	12–14 November, (South Africa) Durban	none		2–5 March, (Australia) Coolum Beach	5–8 December, (Nigeria) Abuja	none	25–27 November, (Malta) Valletta	none	
██ = Did not attend.

== See also ==
- Foreign relations of the United Kingdom
- List of international trips made by prime ministers of the United Kingdom
- List of state visits made by Elizabeth II
