= List of international prime ministerial trips made by Andy Burnham =

Prime Minister Andy Burnham arrives in Turkey, November 2026

Andy Burnham has served as Prime Minister of the United Kingdom since 20 July 2026. As of 21 November 2026, Burnham has made six international trips to eight countries as prime minister.

== Summary ==
As of 21 November 2026, the number of visits per country/territory where Burnham travelled are:

- One: Antigua and Barbuda, Belgium, Ireland, the Netherlands, Turkey, Ukraine, and the United States
- Two: Germany

World map highlighting the countries visited by Andy Burnham during his premiership: (21 November 2026) United Kingdom One visit Two visits Three visits Four visits Five visits Six visits 7 or more visits

== 2026 ==
#	Country/Territory	Location	Date	Details	Image
1	Ukraine	Kyiv	24 August	Burnham visited Ukraine for his inaugural trip as the prime minister of the United Kingdom. Burnham co-chaired his first meeting of the coalition of the willing alongside German Chancellor Friedrich Merz and, virtually, French President Emmanuel Macron. During the trip, Burnham announced his decision to allow defence company MBDA to declassify information on UK components for the long-range Franco–British Storm Shadow missile. Burnham and Ukrainian President Volodymyr Zelenskyy signed an AI partnership agreement, making the United Kingdom the first country to be granted access to Ukrainian battlefield data used to train AI models to identify and strike Russian targets.	
2	United States	New York City	22 September	Burnham attended the 81st United Nations General Assembly. Burnham met with Spanish Prime Minister Pedro Sanchez at Central Park for a walk and a private meeting; Burnham later held his first in-person meeting with US President Donald Trump.	
3	Germany	Berlin	8 October	Burnham met with German Chancellor Friedrich Merz to formally ratify the Kensington Treaty. During the trip, Burnham stated that the UK is open to Germany joining the Global Combat Air Programme, a joint UK–Italy–Japan sixth-generation fighter project, following the collapse of the Future Combat Air System programme between France, Germany, and Spain.	
4	Antigua and Barbuda	St. John's	2–4 November	Burnham attended the 2026 Commonwealth Heads of Government Meeting.	
5	Turkey	Antalya	12 November	Burnham attended COP31.	
5	Ireland	Dublin	12 November	Burnham attended the 9th European Political Community Summit.	
6	Germany	Berlin	19 November	Burnham co-chaired a meeting of the coalition of the willing, where he announced that the UK will provide Ukraine with 1,000 long-range drones. After the meeting Burnham commented that the coalition was "more determined than ever to stay the course" in support of Ukraine.	
6	Belgium	Brussels	20 November	Burnham attended the 2026 EU–UK summit.	
6	Netherlands	Amsterdam	21 November	Burnham met with Prime Minister Rob Jetten at a dinner at the Rijksmuseum.	

== Upcoming trips ==
The following international prime ministerial trips are scheduled to be made by Burnham in 2026:

Country	Location	Date	Details
United States	Miami	14–15 December	Burnham is expected to attend the 2026 G20 Miami summit.

== Multilateral meetings ==
Burnham is scheduled to attend the following regular summits during his premiership:

Group	Year			
Group	2026	2027	2028	2029
CHOGM	2–4 November, (Antigua and Barbuda) St John's	none	TBD	none
COP	12 November (Turkey) Antalya	TBD (Ethiopia) Addis Ababa	TBD	
EPC		TBD, Switzerland	TBD, Azerbaijan	TBD
EPC	12 November, (Republic of Ireland) Dublin	TBD, Greece	TBD, Latvia	
G20	14–15 December, (United States) Miami	27–28 November, (United Kingdom) Manchester	TBD, South Korea	
G7		TBD, United States	TBD, United Kingdom	TBD, Germany
JEF		TBD; Iceland	TBD (Lithuania) Vilnius	TBD
NATO		none	TBD, (Albania) Tirana	TBD
UNGA	22 September, (United States) New York City	TBD, (United States) New York City	TBD, (United States) New York City	
██ = Did not attend. ██ = Future event.

== See also ==
- Foreign relations of the United Kingdom
- List of international trips made by Ed Miliband as Foreign Secretary
- List of international trips made by prime ministers of the United Kingdom
- List of official overseas trips made by Charles III
