= List of international prime ministerial trips made by Gordon Brown =

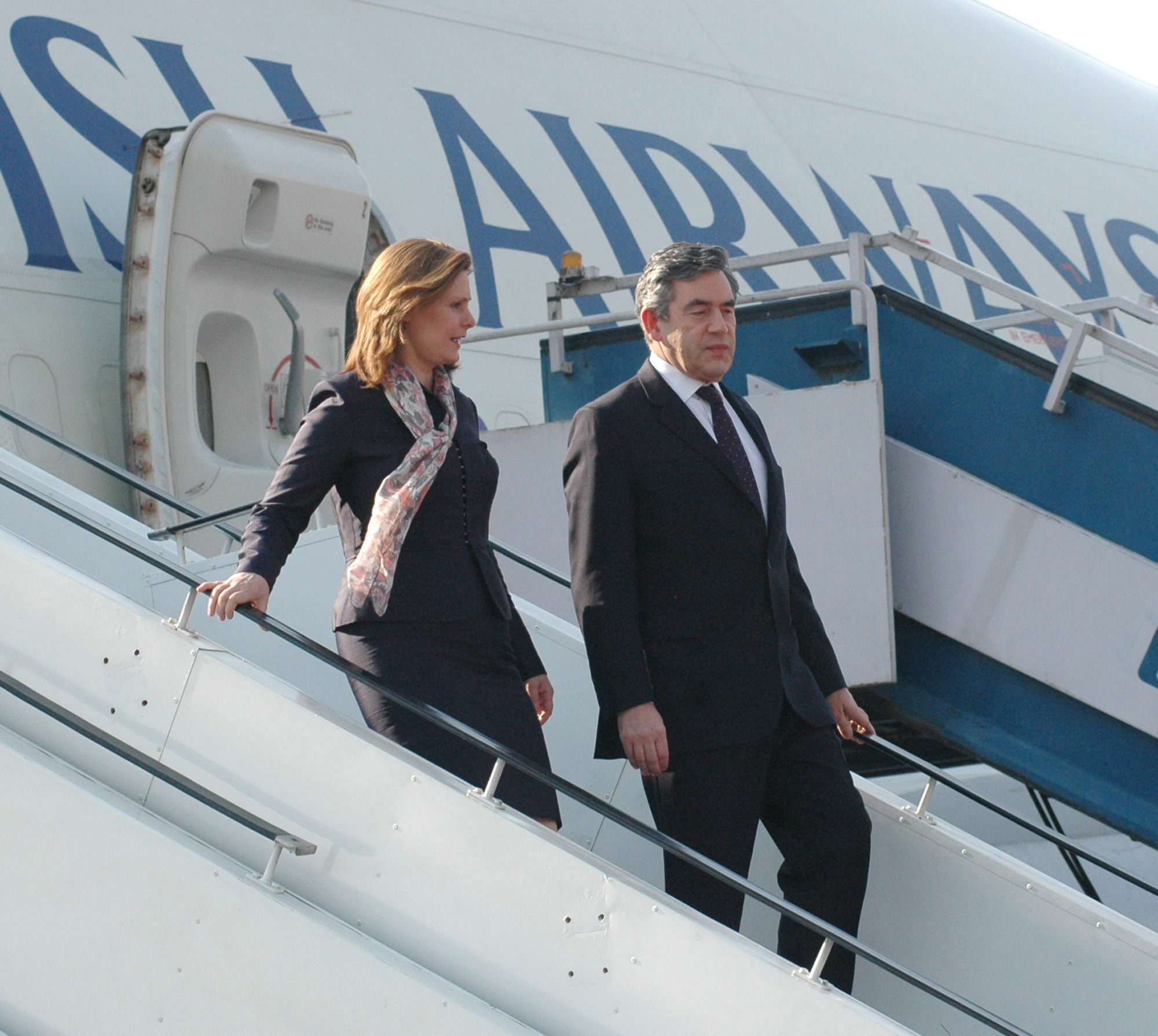
Prime Minister Gordon Brown and his wife Sarah Brown, January 2008.

This is the list of international prime ministerial trips made by Gordon Brown, who has served as Prime Minister of the United Kingdom from 27 June 2007 until 11 May 2010. Gordon Brown made 63 trips to 30 countries during his premiership.

== Summary ==
The number of visits per country where Brown travelled are:

- One: Brazil, Chile, the Czech Republic, Denmark, Egypt, Japan, Palestine, Poland, Qatar, Romania, Trinidad and Tobago, Uganda, the United Arab Emirates, and the Vatican City.
- Two: China, India, Israel, Italy, Pakistan, Portugal, Saudi Arabia, and Switzerland.
- Three: Kuwait.
- Four: Iraq.
- Five: Oman and Germany.
- Seven: Afghanistan and the United States.
- Fourteen: France.
- Sixteen: Belgium.

World map highlighting the countries visited by Gordon Brown during his premiership: United Kingdom One visit Two visits Three visits Four visits Five visits Six visits 7 or more visits

== 2007 ==
#	Country	Location	Date	Details	Image
1	Germany	Berlin	16 July	Brown's first overseas trip as prime minister was to Berlin, where he spoke with German Chancellor Angela Merkel. The meeting was overshadowed by the expulsion of four Russian diplomats in response to a lack of Russian cooperation on the investigation of the poising of Alexander Litvinenko.	
2	France	Paris	20 July	Brown met with French President Nicolas Sarkozy. The two leaders vowed to intensify France–UK cooperation on terrorism, and make a joint push in the United Nations Security Council to deploy peacekeeping troops in Sudan in response to the killing of civilians in western Darfur.	
3	United States	Washington, D.C., Camp David, New York City	29–31 July	Brown met with US President George W. Bush at Camp David. Brown later met with United Nations Secretary-General Ban Ki-moon, and made a speech to the United Nations.	
4	Kuwait	Kuwait City	1–2 October	Brown travelled to Kuwait en route to Iraq.	
4	Iraq	Baghdad, Basra	2 October	Brown met with Iraqi President Nouri al-Maliki in Baghdad. Following the meeting, Brown announced that British forces in Iraq would reduce by 1,000 troops. Later that day, Brown travelled to Basra to meet British troops.	
5	Portugal	Lisbon	18–19 October	Brown attended his first EU summit since becoming prime minister, where finalisation of the Treaty of Lisbon occurred. Brown also threatened to skip a future EU-Africa summit if Zimbabwean President Robert Mugabe was to be there.	
6	France	Paris	20 October	Brown attended the 2007 Rugby World Cup final, in which England lost to South Africa.	
7	Uganda	Kampala	22–25 November	Brown attended the 2007 Commonwealth Heads of Government Meeting. Brown agreed to give Uganda £700m in aid.	
9	Kuwait	Kuwait City	9 December	Brown travelled to Kuwait en route to Iraq.	
9	Iraq	Basra	9 December	Brown addressed British troops as they prepared to hand over the region to Iraqi forces at the end of the month.	
9	Oman	Muscat	9–10 December	Brown travelled to Oman en route to Afghanistan.	
9	Afghanistan	Lashkargah, Kabul	10 December	Brown met and spoke with British troops in Camp Bastion; he later visited Kabul to meet with Afghan President Hamid Karzai.	
10	Portugal	Lisbon	12–13 December	Brown turned up late to the ceremony for the Signing of the Treaty of Lisbon, overshadowing the event.	
10	Belgium	Brussels	13 December	Brown attended a European Council summit.	

== 2008 ==
#	Country	Location	Date	Details	Image
11	China	Beijing, Shanghai	17–20 January	Brown met with Chinese Premier Wen Jiabao at the Great Hall of the People, the two leaders discussed international issues relating to Iran, Darfur, Myanmar, Sudan, and the Middle East. Brown opened an office of the London Stock Exchange in Beijing. On the final day of his trip to China, Brown visited a Chinese Eco-city in Dongtan.	
11	India	New Delhi	20–21 January	Brown had dinner with Indian Prime Minister Manmohan Singh where the two discussed common issues, such as climate change and the need to boost counter-terrorism links. During the trip, Brown expressed support for India's bid to become a Permanent member of the United Nations Security Council.	
12	Switzerland	Davos	25 January	Brown attended the World Economic Forum annual meeting.	
12	Belgium	Brussels	21 February	Brown held a 3 hour long meeting with European Commission President Jose Manuel Barroso. Brown declared that Britain and the European Union were inseparable.	
13	Belgium	Brussels	13–14 March	Brown attended a European Council summit.	
14	Romania	Bucharest	2–4 April	Brown attended the 2008 Bucharest NATO summit.	
15	United States	New York City, Washington, D.C., Boston	16–18 April	Brown attended a United Nations General Assembly meeting. Brown had breakfast with United Nations Secretary-General Ban Ki-Moon, followed by a UN Security Council session on peacemaking in Africa in which Brown raised the recent controversy surrounding elections in Zimbabwe. Brown's visited coincided with Pope Benedict XVI's visit to the US. On his second day of the trip, Brown held meetings with 3 potential candidates for the 2008 presidential election in Washington, D.C.: Hillary Clinton, Barack Obama, and John McCain. Brown met with US President Bush, where the two promoted the Special Relationship between the two countries. On the final day of his trip, Brown travelled to Boston where he made a speech at John F. Kennedy Presidential Library, in which he highlighted the significance of the Transatlantic relations between Europe and the United States.	
16	France	Paris	19 June	Brown had lunch with French President Sarkozy.	
16	Belgium	Brussels	19–20 June	Brown attended a European Council summit, the summit primarily focused on rising oil and food prices, the 2008 financial crisis, sanctions against Zimbabwe, and the ratification of the Treaty of Lisbon.	
17	Saudi Arabia	Jeddah	21–22 June	Brown attended an oil summit which focused on tackling the escalating 2000s energy crisis. Brown called upon oil and gas producers to increase supply meanwhile urging countries to become more energy efficient.	
18	Japan	Tōyako	7–9 July	Brown attended the 2008 G8 summit. Brown helda tense meeting with Russian President Dmitry Medvedev focusing on bilateral issues including visas for BP workers; the closure of British Council offices; and Russia's refusal to extradite Andrei Lugovoy for the alleged poisoning of Alexander Litvinenko.	
19	France	Paris	13 July	Brown attended the Paris Summit for the Mediterranean.	
20	Iraq	Baghdad, Basra	19 July	Brown met with Iraqi Prime Minister Nouri al-Maliki, and later Iraqi President Jalal Talibani. Later that day, Brown visited British trips in Basra.	
20	Israel	Tel Aviv, Jerusalem	19–21 July	Brown arrived in Tel Aviv, where he had a meeting with Israeli President Shimon Peres. Returning from Palestine, Brown and his wife, Sarah Brown, toured Yad Vashem. Brown became the first UK prime minister to address the Knesset.	
20	Palestine	Bethlehem	20 July	Brown met with Palestinian President Mahmoud Abbas, where he demanded that Israel cease its settlement expansion in the West Bank and the Gaza Strip. Brown announced £30m of additional financial support for the Palestinian Authority.	
21	Oman	Muscat	21 July	Brown held a bilateral meeting with Omani Sultan Qaboos bin Said.	
21	Afghanistan	Lashkargah, Kabul	21 July	Brown visited British troops, toured a field hospital, and met injured soldiers at Camp Bastion. Brown later met with Afghan President Hamid Karzai, where he announced $120 million more in aid for Afghan development, and extra support for training and building the army and police forces.	
21	China	Beijing	22–24 July	Brown held meetings with Chinese President Hu Jintao, and later Chinese Premier Wen Jiabao. Brown attended the 2008 Summer Olympics closing ceremony, including the handover to London for the 2012 Summer Olympics.	
22	Belgium	Brussels	1 September	Brown attended an emergency European Council summit in the wake of the Russo-Georgian War.	
23	United States	New York City, Washington, D.C.	24–27 September	Brown attended the United Nations General Assembly and the Global Initiative Conference. Brown held a meeting with US President Bush, where the two discussed Bush's global bail-out plan, as well as the situations in Afghanistan, Georgia, and Iraq.	
24	France	Paris	4 October	Brown attended an E4 meeting, in which the European leaders agreed to work together to combat the 2008 financial crisis.	
25	France	Paris	12 October	Brown joined 15 Eurozone leaders at the Élysée Palace, where he convinced them to adopt the "Brown plan" last night to tackle the financial crisis by spending billions of euros to guarantee loans and the survival of leading banks.	
26	Belgium	Brussels	15–16 October	Brown attended a European Council meeting.	
27	France	Versailles, Paris	28 October	Brown met with French President Sarkozy at his residency at La Lanterne. The two held a meeting in Paris where they coordinated there positions on tackling the 2008 financial crisis.	
28	Saudi Arabia	Riyadh	1–2 November	Brown held a 3 hour meeting bilateral meeting with Saudi King Abdullah, in which he tried to persuade Saudi Arabia to increase its investment in the International Monetary Fund.	
28	Qatar	Doha	2–3 November	Brown held a bilateral meeting with Sheikh Hamad bin Jassim al-Thani, in which he continues pushing Gulf state leaders to invest in the IMF.	
28	United Arab Emirates	Abu Dhabi, Dubai	3–4 November	Brown held a meeting with Sheikh Hamad bin Jassim al-Thani, with British Ambassador to the United Arab Emirates Edward Oakden also present. Brown also signed joint £250m low carbon investment fund deal with Masdar.	
29	Belgium	Brussels	7 November	Brown attended an informal European Council meeting.	
30	United States	New York City, Washington, D.C.	13–15 November	Brown attended a United Nations meeting. Later in the trip he attended the 2008 G20 Washington summit.	
31	Belgium	Brussels	11–12 December	Brown attended a European Council meeting.	
32	Afghanistan	Lashkargah, Kabul	13 December	Brown visited British troops at Camp Bastion. Later in Kabul, Brown held a bilateral meeting with Afghan President Hamid Karzai.	
32	India	New Delhi	13–14 December	Brown held a bilateral meeting with Indian Prime Minister Manmohan Singh. The two discussed 2008 Mumbai attacks, with Brown backing India's assertion that Lashkar-e-Taiba was responsible for the attack.	
32	Pakistan	Islamabad	14 December	Brown held a bilateral meeting with Pakistani President Asif Ali Zardari, in which they discussed the 2008 Mumbai attacks and Pakistan's connections with terrorism; Brown warned that ‘linked to 75% of all UK terror plots’.	
33	Kuwait	Kuwait City	17–18 December	Brown was received at Kuwait International Airport by Kuwaiti Foreign Minister Sabah Al-Khalid Al-Sabah. Brown later held talks with Kuwaiti Emir Nawaf Al-Ahmad Al-Jaber Al-Sabah.	
33	Iraq	Kabul, Basra, Umm Qasr	18 December	Brown signed an agreement with Iraqi Prime Minister Nouri al-Maliki for the end of British involvement in the Iraq War. Later that day, Brown visited UK troops, and toured Umm Qasr Port by boat.	

== 2009 ==
#	Country	Location	Date	Details	Image
34	France	Paris	14–15 January	Brown had dinner with French President Sarkozy, where the two discussed preparations for the upcoming G20 London summit.	
34	Germany	Berlin	15 January	Brown met with German Chancellor Merkel for discussion on G20 preparations.	
35	Egypt	Sharm El-Sheikh	18 January	Brown attended a Middle East Peace Conference on the 2008–2009 Gaza War.	
35	Israel	Jerusalem	18 January	Brown had dinner with Israeli Prime Minister Ehud Olmert, along with other European leaders, following the announcement of the 2008 Israel–Hamas ceasefire.	
36	Switzerland	Davos	29–31 January	Brown attended the World Economic Forum annual meeting.	
37	Italy	Rome	19 February	Brown held a meeting with Italian Prime Minister Silvio Berlusconi, in which they discussed the upcoming G20 and G8 summits.	
37	Vatican City		19 February	Brown had a meeting with Pope Benedict XVI.	
38	Germany	Berlin	22 February	Brown held a bilateral meeting with German Chancellor Merkel.	
39	Belgium	Brussels	1 March	Brown attended an emergency European Council summit.	
40	United States	Washington, D.C.	2–3 March	Brown held a meeting with US President Barack Obama at the White House.	
41	France	Paris	19–20 March	Brown held bilateral talks with French President Sarkozy.	
41	Belgium	Brussels	20 March	Brown attended a European Council meeting.	
42	France	Strasbourg	24–25 March	Brown made a speech to the European Parliament.	
42	United States	New York City	25–26 March	Brown made a speech criticizing Wall Street financiers for their role in the 2008 financial crisis.	
42	Brazil	Brasília	26–27 March	Brown held a meeting with Brazilian President Luiz Inacio Lula da Silva discussed the global economic crisis, trade, and the environment.	
42	Chile	Viña del Mar	27–28 March	Brown became the first incumbent British prime minister to visit Chile. Brown held a meeting with Chilean President Michelle Bachelet. Brown held a meeting with Argentine President Cristina Fernández, in which he rejected an appeal to reopen talks over the sovereignty of the Falkland Islands.	
43	France	Strasbourg	3–4 April	Brown attended the 2009 NATO summit.	
44	Czech Republic	Prague	5 April	Brown attended an EU–US summit.	
45	Afghanistan	Kabul, Lashkargah	26–27 April	Brown travelled to Camp Bastion where he spoke to International Security Assistance Force troops. During his visit, Brown told the troops that he was thankful for the hard work they are performing in southern Afghanistan. He later met with Afghan President Hamid Karzai in Kabul, where the two leaders discussed a new strategy for dealing with terrorism resulting from the Afghanistan–Pakistan border.	
45	Pakistan	Islamabad	27–28 April	Brown met with Pakistani Prime Minister Yusuf Raza Gilani where he pledged £10m to fight extremism in Pakistan. Brown was scheduled to meet with Pakistani President Asif Ali Zardari, however Zaradari cancelled the meeting last minute.	
45	Poland	Warsaw, Oświęcim	28 April	Brown met with Polish President Lech Kaczyński in the Presidential Palace; they discussed terrorism in Afghanistan, recent violence towards Poles in the UK, supporting Poland's negotiations with the European Commission, Polish shipbuilding industry, and tackling unemployment in the wake of the Great Recession. Brown also met with Polish Prime Minister Donald Tusk, where the two leaders clashed on economic policies in relation to tackling the Great Recession. Brown later visited Auschwitz concentration camp where he promised to provide UK funding for maintenance work at Auschwitz-Birkenau State Museum.	
46	France	Bayeux, Colleville-sur-Mer	6 June	Brown visited Normandy, along with Prince Charles, to commemorate the 65th anniversary of the D-Day landings. During a memorial service, the two laid wreaths inside Bayeux Cathedral in honour of British servicemen. Brown and Prince Charles later joined President Obama, President Sarkozy, and Prime Minister Harper at remembrance service amid the graves of US servicemen in Colleville-sur-Mer.	
47	Belgium	Brussels	18–19 June	Brown attended a European Council summit, focused on proposals for a new European "financial architecture" in response to the Great Recession. Brown pushed against European proposals to exert greater controls over the City of London, the British financial sector and national fiscal powers. At the end of the summit, Brown claimed he had “ensured taxpayers will be properly protected”.	
48	France	Évian-les-Bains	6 July	Brown Met with French President Sarkozy for a France–UK summit, primarily focused on the upcoming G8 summit. The two discussed tensions with Iran and economic recovery, additionally the UK promised France £15m for border protection in return for help deporting immigrants. Brown's priorities for the summit were focusing on asylum-seekers at Calais, in addition to nuclear power discussions, Anglo-French collaboration on big infrastructure projects and progress towards a new environmental settlement for COP15.	
49	Italy	L'Aquila	8–10 July	Brown attended the 2009 G8 summit. The summit notably was the first meeting between Brown and Colonol Muammar Gaddafi, in which the two discussed the Lockerbie bombing. Brown also floated the possibility of Britain reducing its number of nuclear weapons to persuade countries including Iran and North Korea to renounce nuclear weapons.	
50	Oman	Muscat	29–30 August	Brown travelled to Oman en route to Afghanistan.	
50	Afghanistan	Lashkargah	30 August	Brown travelled to Camp Bastion where pledged to provide more equipment to help overcome the threat of Taliban roadside bombs. Brown travelled with Air Chief Marshal Sir Jock Stirrup, Chief of the Defence Staff, and spoke with senior commanders, including US commander General Stanley McChrystal.	
51	Germany	Berlin	6 September	Brown met with German Chancellor Merkel, where the two agreed to back a new UN conference to agree a fresh political approach towards Afghanistan following the controversial presidential elections.	
52	France	Paris	15 September	Brown visited France for a bilateral meeting with President Sarkozy at Élysée Palace. The two leaders primarily used the trip to discuss their differing views over how greater regulation of the financial sector should be agreed, with Sarkozy pushing harder further than Brown in calling for a clamp down on bankers' bonuses.	
53	Belgium	Brussels	17 September	Brown attended a meeting with fellow European leaders, in which they agreed an EU clause on banker's bonuses. During a dinner at Brussels, Brown proposed a plan, termed the global compact, for the G20 and the IMF to instruct nations on their national policies to focus on sustainable growth.	
54	United States	New York City, Pittsburgh	22–24 September	Brown attended the UN general assembly, where he made a speech focusing on issues relating to Africa, climate change, nuclear arms, recession, and terrorism. Brown was awarded "Statesman of the Year" by the Appeal of Conscience Foundation. Brown attended the 2009 G20 Pittsburgh summit.	
55	Germany	Berlin	9 November	Brown attended commemorations for the 20th Anniversary of the fall of the Berlin Wall. Brown made a speech where he paid tribute to the "unbreakable spirit" of those who "dared to dream".	
56	Belgium	Brussels	19 November	Brown attended a special European Council meeting, where the European leaders elected the first President of the European Council and High Representative of the Union for Foreign Affairs and Security Policy. Brown stated that newly elected Van Rompuy had unanimous backing at the summit, despite previously lobbying for Tony Blair for the role; Britain's Baroness Catherine Ashton was given the role of High Representative.	
57	Trinidad and Tobago	Port of Spain	26–28 November	Brown attended the 2009 Commonwealth Heads of Government Meeting. Brown emphasised that Zimbabwe needed to implement significant reform to resume its membership of the Commonwealth.	
58	Belgium	Brussels	10–11 December	Brown attended a European Council meeting. Brown announced a pledge, from European leaders, to provide €7.2 billion to help developing nations adapt to climate change.	
59	Oman	Muscat	12 December	Brown travelled to Oman en route to Afghanistan.	
59	Afghanistan	Kandahar	12–13 December	Brown visited Kandahar Airfield for a pre-Christmas visit. Brown became the first UK prime minister to sleep overnight in Afghanistan during the trip. He inspected new equipment and held talks with Afghan President Hamid Karzai.	
60	Denmark	Copenhagen	15–18 December	Brown attended the Copenhagen climate summit.	

== 2010 ==
#	Country	Location	Date	Details	Image
61	Belgium	Brussels	11 February	Brown attended an Informal European Council meeting.	
62	Oman	Muscat	5–6 March	Brown travelled to Oman en route to Afghanistan.	
62	Afghanistan	Lashkargah	6 March	Brown visited British troops in Helmand Province, including Camp Bastion and Forward Operating Base Shawqat. The visit took place during the early stages of Operation Moshtarak.	
63	Belgium	Brussels	25 March	Brown attended a European Council summit. He proposed creating a "European peace corps" based on the United States Peace Corps.	

== Multilateral meetings ==
Brown was scheduled to attend the following regular summits during his premiership:

Group	Year			
Group	2007	2008	2009	2010
UNGA	31 July (United States) New York City	24–27 September (United States) New York City	22–24 September (United States) New York City	
G8		7–9 July (Japan) Tōyako	8–10 July, (Italy) L'Aquila	
G20	none	14–15 November (United States) Washington, D.C.	1–5 April (United Kingdom) London	
G20	none	14–15 November (United States) Washington, D.C.	24 September (United States) Pittsburgh	
NATO	none	2–4 April (Romania) Bucharest	3–4 April; Strasbourg (Germany) Kehl	
CHOGM	23–25 November (Uganda) Kampala	none	27–29 November (Trinidad and Tobago) Port of Spain	none

== See also ==
- Foreign relations of the United Kingdom
- List of international trips made by prime ministers of the United Kingdom
- List of state visits made by Elizabeth II
