= List of international trips made by prime ministers of the United Kingdom =

Prime Minister Andy Burnham arrives in Turkey, November 2026.

The following is a list of international prime ministerial trips made by prime ministers of the United Kingdom in chronological order since the start of Premiership of Tony Blair in 1997.

== Summary ==
As of 21 November 2026, the number of visits per country/territory where Prime Ministers have travelled since the start of Premiership of Tony Blair in 1997 are:

- One: Algeria, Antigua and Barbuda, Armenia, Azerbaijan, Bangladesh, Barbados, Chile, Croatia, Cyprus, Ethiopia, Ghana, Gibraltar, Grenada, Kazakhstan, Kenya, Kosovo, Moldova, Mozambique, Myanmar, New Zealand, Rwanda, Samoa, Senegal, Slovenia, Sri Lanka, Sudan, Syria, Trinidad and Tobago, Uganda, and Vietnam
- Two: Akrotiri and Dhekelia, Albania, Argentina, Bahrain, Iceland, Jamaica, Lebanon, Lithuania, Malaysia, Mexico, and Sierra Leone
- Three: Bosnia and Herzegovina, Bulgaria, Greece, Hong Kong, Hungary, Latvia, North Macedonia, (Note: North Macedonia was officially known as the Republic of Macedonia during Tony Blair's visits in 1999 and Theresa May's visit in 2018.) Qatar, Romania, Singapore, Slovakia, and South Korea
- Four: Australia, Indonesia, Libya, Malta, Nigeria, Norway, and the Vatican City
- Five: Brazil and Estonia
- Six: Luxembourg
- Seven: Austria, Canada, Denmark, Finland, Kuwait, Pakistan, Palestine, and Portugal
- Eight: the Czech Republic and Oman
- Nine: Israel, Jordan, and South Africa
- Ten: China, Egypt, Japan, Turkey, Ukraine, and the United Arab Emirates
- Twelve: India, Iraq, Russia, and Sweden
- Thirteen: Saudi Arabia
- Fourteen: Ireland and the Netherlands
- Fifteen: Poland
- Sixteen: Spain
- Seventeen: Afghanistan
- Eighteen: Switzerland
- Thirty-one: Italy
- Fifty-five: The United States
- Sixty-three: Germany
- Eighty-one: France
- One-hundred and thirty-two: Belgium

Countries/Territories	International trips made by British Prime Ministers									
Countries/Territories	Tony Blair (1997–2007)	Gordon Brown (2007–2010)	David Cameron (2010–2016)	Theresa May (2016–2019)	Boris Johnson (2019–2022)	Liz Truss (2022)	Rishi Sunak (2022–2024)	Keir Starmer (2024–2026)	Andy Burnham (since 2026)	Total (Since 1997)
Afghanistan	1 (2002)	7 (2007, 2008, 2009, 2010)	9 (2010, 2011, 2012, 2013, 2014)	none	none	none	none	none	none	17 (2002, 2007, 2008, 2009, 2010, 2011, 2012, 2013, 2014)
Akrotiri and Dhekelia	none	none	none	1 (2017)	none	none	none	1 (2024)	none	2 (2017, 2024)
Albania	1 (1999)	none	none	none	none	none	none	1 (2025)	none	2 (1999, 2025)
Algeria	none	none	1 (2013)	none	none	none	none	none	none	1 (2013)
Antigua and Barbuda	none	none	none	none	none	none	none	none	1 (2026)	1 (2026)
Argentina	1 (2001)	none	none	1 (2018)	none	none	none	none	none	2 (2001, 2018)
Armenia	none	none	none	none	none	none	none	1 (2026)	none	1 (2026)
Australia	2 (2002, 2006)	none	2 (2011, 2014)	none	none	none	none	none	none	4 (2002, 2006, 2011, 2014)
Austria	3 (1998)	none	1 (2015)	2 (2018)	none	none	1 (2024)	none	none	7 (1998, 2015, 2018, 2024)
Azerbaijan	none	none	none	none	none	none	none	1 (2024)	none	1 (2024)
Bahrain	none	none	none	1 (2018)	none	none	none	1 (2026)	none	2 (2018, 2026)
Bangladesh	1 (2002)	none	none	none	none	none	none	none	none	1 (2002)
Barbados	1 (2006)	none	none	none	none	none	none	none	none	1 (2006)
Belgium	31 (1998, 1999, 2000, 2001, 2002, 2003, 2004, 2005, 2006, 2007)	16 (2007, 2008, 2009, 2010)	50 (2010, 2011, 2012, 2013, 2014, 2015, 2016)	27 (2016, 2017, 2018, 2019)	5 (2019, 2020, 2021, 2022)	none	none	2 (2024, 2025)	1 (2026)	132 (1998, 1999, 2000, 2001, 2002, 2003, 2004, 2005, 2006, 2007, 2008, 2009, 2010, 2011, 2012, 2013, 2014, 2015, 2016, 2017, 2018, 2019, 2020, 2021, 2022, 2024, 2025, 2026)
Bosnia and Herzegovina	3 (1997, 1999, 2000)	none	none	none	none	none	none	none	none	3 (1997, 1999, 2000)
Brazil	1 (2001)	1 (2009)	1 (2012)	none	none	none	none	2 (2024, 2025)	none	5 (2001, 2009, 2012, 2024, 2025)
Bulgaria	1 (1999)	none	1 (2015)	1 (2018)	none	none	none	none	none	3 (1999, 2015, 2018)
Canada	2 (2001, 2002)	none	2 (2010, 2011)	2 (2017, 2018)	none	none	none	1 (2025)	none	7 (2001, 2002, 2010, 2011, 2017, 2018, 2025)
Chile	none	1 (2009)	none	none	none	none	none	none	none	1 (2009)
China	3 (1998, 2003, 2005)	2 (2008)	2 (2010, 2013)	2 (2016, 2018)	none	none	none	1 (2026)	none	10 (1998, 2003, 2005, 2008, 2010, 2013, 2016, 2018, 2026)
Croatia	1 (2000)	none	none	none	none	none	none	none	none	1 (2000)
Cyprus	none	none	none	none	none	none	none	1 (2024)	none	1 (2024)
Czech Republic	3 (2002, 2006)	1 (2009)	3 (2011, 2015)	none	none	1 (2022)	none	none	none	8 (2002, 2006, 2009, 2011, 2015, 2022)
Denmark	2 (1998, 2002)	1 (2009)	1 (2016)	2 (2016, 2018)	none	none	none	1 (2025)	none	7 (1998, 2002, 2009, 2016, 2018, 2025)
Egypt	4 (1998, 2001, 2004, 2006)	1 (2009)	1 (2010)	1 (2019)	none	none	2 (2022, 2023)	1 (2025)	none	10 (1998, 2001, 2004, 2006, 2009, 2010, 2019, 2022, 2023, 2025)
Estonia	none	none	none	1 (2017)	2 (2019, 2022)	none	1 (2022)	1 (2024)	none	5 (2017, 2019, 2022, 2024)
Ethiopia	1 (2004)	none	none	none	none	none	none	none	none	1 (2004)
Finland	4 (1998, 1999, 2006)	none	1 (2014)	none	1 (2022)	none	none	1 (2026)	none	7 (1998, 1999, 2006, 2014, 2022, 2026)
France	27 (1997, 1998, 1999, 2000, 2001, 2002, 2003, 2004, 2005, 2007)	13 (2007, 2008, 2009)	18 (2010, 2011, 2012, 2013, 2014, 2015, 2016)	10 (2016, 2017, 2018, 2019)	2 (2019)	none	2 (2023, 2024)	9 (2024, 2025, 2026)	none	81 (1997, 1998, 1999, 2000, 2001, 2002, 2003, 2004, 2005, 2007, 2008, 2009, 2010, 2011, 2012, 2013, 2014, 2015, 2016, 2017, 2018, 2019, 2023, 2024, 2025, 2026)
Germany	22 (1997, 1998, 1999, 2000, 2001, 2002, 2003, 2004, 2007)	5 (2007, 2009)	12 (2010, 2011, 2012, 2013, 2014, 2015, 2016)	9 (2016, 2017, 2018, 2019)	4 (2019, 2020, 2022)	none	2 (2023, 2024)	7 (2024, 2025, 2026)	2 (2026)	63 (1997, 1998, 1999, 2000, 2001, 2002, 2003, 2004, 2007, 2009, 2010, 2011, 2012, 2013, 2014, 2015, 2016, 2017, 2018, 2019, 2020, 2022, 2023, 2024, 2025, 2026)
Ghana	1 (2002)	none	none	none	none	none	none	none	none	1 (2002)
Gibraltar	none	none	1 (2016)	none	none	none	none	none	none	1 (2016)
Greece	3 (2003, 2004)	none	none	none	none	none	none	none	none	3 (2003, 2004)
Grenada	none	none	1 (2015)	none	none	none	none	none	none	1 (2015)
Hong Kong	3 (1997, 1998, 2003)	none	none	none	none	none	none	none	none	3 (1997, 1998, 2003)
Hungary	1 (2004)	none	1 (2016)	none	none	none	none	1 (2024)	none	3 (2004, 2016, 2024)
Iceland	none	none	1 (2015)	none	none	none	1 (2023)	none	none	2 (2015, 2023)
India	3 (2001, 2002, 2005)	2 (2008)	3 (2010, 2012, 2013)	1 (2016)	1 (2022)	none	1 (2023)	1 (2025)	none	12 (2001, 2002, 2005, 2008, 2010, 2012, 2013, 2016, 2022, 2023, 2025)
Indonesia	1 (2006)	none	2 (2012, 2015)	none	none	none	1 (2022)	none	none	4 (2006, 2012, 2015, 2022)
Iraq	7 (2003, 2004, 2005, 2006, 2007)	4 (2007, 2008)	none	1 (2017)	none	none	none	none	none	12 (2003, 2004, 2005, 2006, 2007, 2008, 2017)
Ireland	7 (1998, 2001, 2003, 2004)	none	1 (2011)	2 (2017, 2019)	1 (2019)	none	none	2 (2024, 2026)	1 (2026)	14 (1998, 2001, 2003, 2004, 2011, 2017, 2019, 2024, 2026)
Israel	5 (1998, 2001, 2004, 2006)	2 (2008, 2009)	1 (2014)	none	none	none	1 (2023)	none	none	9 (1998, 2001, 2004, 2006, 2008, 2009, 2014, 2023)
Italy	16 (1997, 1998, 1999, 2000, 2001, 2002, 2003, 2004, 2005)	2 (2009)	5 (2010, 2011, 2012, 2014, 2015)	3 (2016, 2017)	1 (2021)	none	2 (2023, 2024)	2 (2024, 2025)	none	31 (1997, 1998, 1999, 2000, 2001, 2002, 2003, 2004, 2005, 2009, 2010, 2011, 2012, 2014, 2015, 2016, 2017, 2021, 2023, 2024, 2025)
Jamaica	1 (2001)	none	1 (2015)	none	none	none	none	none	none	2 (2001, 2015)
Japan	3 (1998, 2000, 2003)	1 (2008)	2 (2012, 2016)	2 (2017, 2019)	none	none	1 (2023)	1 (2026)	none	10 (1998, 2000, 2003, 2008, 2012, 2016, 2017, 2019, 2023, 2026)
Jordan	5 (1998, 1999, 2001, 2004)	none	2 (2012, 2015)	2 (2017)	none	none	none	none	none	9 (1998, 1999, 2001, 2004, 2012, 2015, 2017)
Kazakhstan	none	none	1 (2013)	none	none	none	none	none	none	1 (2013)
Kenya	none	none	none	1 (2018)	none	none	none	none	none	1 (2018)
Kosovo	1 (1999)	none	none	none	none	none	none	none	none	1 (1999)
Kuwait	3 (1999, 2003, 2005)	3 (2007, 2008)	1 (2011)	none	none	none	none	none	none	7 (1999, 2003, 2005, 2007, 2008, 2011)
Latvia	none	none	2 (2013, 2015)	none	none	none	1 (2022)	none	none	3 (2013, 2015, 2022)
Lebanon	1 (2006)	none	1 (2015)	none	none	none	none	none	none	2 (2006, 2015)
Libya	2 (2004, 2007)	none	2 (2011, 2013)	none	none	none	none	none	none	4 (2004, 2007, 2011, 2013)
Lithuania	none	none	1 (2013)	none	none	none	1 (2023)	none	none	2 (2013, 2023)
Luxembourg	4 (1997, 1998)	none	1 (2015)	none	1 (2019)	none	none	none	none	6 (1997, 1998, 2015, 2019)
Macedonia	2 (1999)	none	none	1 (2018)	none	none	none	none	none	3 (1999, 2018)
Malaysia	none	none	2 (2012, 2015)	none	none	none	none	none	none	2 (2012, 2015)
Malta	1 (2005)	none	2 (2015)	1 (2017)	none	none	none	none	none	4 (2005, 2015, 2017)
Mexico	1 (2001)	none	1 (2012)	none	none	none	none	none	none	2 (2001, 2012)
Moldova	none	none	none	none	none	none	1 (2023)	none	none	1 (2023)
Mozambique	1 (2002)	none	none	none	none	none	none	none	none	1 (2002)
Myanmar	none	none	1 (2012)	none	none	none	none	none	none	1 (2012)
Netherlands	6 (1997, 1998, 1999)	none	3 (2012, 2014, 2016)	3 (2016, 2018)	none	none	none	1 (2025)	1 (2026)	14 (1997, 1998, 1999, 2012, 2014, 2016, 2018, 2025, 2026)
New Zealand	1 (2006)	none	none	none	none	none	none	none	none	1 (2006)
Nigeria	2 (2002, 2003)	none	1 (2011)	1 (2018)	none	none	none	none	none	4 (2002, 2003, 2011, 2018)
Norway	none	none	1 (2012)	1 (2018)	none	none	none	2 (2024, 2025)	none	4 (2012, 2018, 2024, 2025)
Oman	1 (2001)	5 (2007, 2008, 2009, 2010)	1 (2011)	none	1 (2020)	none	none	none	none	8 (2001, 2007, 2008, 2009, 2010, 2011, 2020)
Pakistan	3 (2001, 2002, 2006)	2 (2008, 2009)	2 (2011, 2013)	none	none	none	none	none	none	7 (2001, 2002, 2006, 2008, 2009, 2011, 2013)
Palestine	5 (1998, 2001, 2004, 2006)	1 (2008)	1 (2014)	none	none	none	none	none	none	7 (1998, 2001, 2004, 2006, 2008, 2014)
Poland	3 (2000, 2002, 2003)	1 (2009)	5 (2014, 2015, 2016)	2 (2016, 2017, 2019)	2 (2022)	none	1 (2024)	1 (2025)	none	15 (2000, 2002, 2003, 2009, 2014, 2015, 2016, 2017, 2019, 2022, 2024, 2025)
Portugal	5 (2000, 2003, 2004)	2 (2007)	none	none	none	none	none	none	none	7 (2000, 2003, 2004, 2007)
Qatar	none	1 (2008)	1 (2011)	none	none	none	none	1 (2026)	none	3 (2008, 2011, 2026)
Romania	1 (1999)	1 (2008)	1 (2015)	none	none	none	none	none	none	3 (1999, 2008, 2015)
Russia	9 (1997, 1999, 2000, 2001, 2002, 2003, 2006)	none	3 (2011, 2013)	none	none	none	none	none	none	12 (1997, 1999, 2000, 2001, 2002, 2003, 2006, 2011, 2013)
Rwanda	none	none	none	none	1 (2022)	none	none	none	none	1 (2022)
Samoa	none	none	none	none	none	none	none	1 (2024)	none	1 (2024)
Saudi Arabia	2 (1998, 2001)	2 (2008)	3 (2012, 2015)	2 (2017)	1 (2022)	none	1 (2023)	2 (2024, 2026)	none	13 (1998, 2001, 2008, 2012, 2015, 2017, 2022, 2023, 2024, 2026)
Senegal	1 (2002)	none	none	none	none	none	none	none	none	1 (2002)
Sierra Leone	2 (2002, 2007)	none	none	none	none	none	none	none	none	2 (2002, 2007)
Singapore	1 (2005)	none	2 (2012, 2015)	none	none	none	none	none	none	3 (2005, 2012, 2015)
Slovakia	1 (2006)	none	1 (2015)	1 (2016)	none	none	none	none	none	3 (2006, 2015, 2016)
Slovenia	none	none	1 (2015)	none	none	none	none	none	none	1 (2015)
South Africa	5 (1999, 2002, 2006, 2007)	none	2 (2011, 2013)	1 (2018)	none	none	none	1 (2025)	none	9 (1999, 2002, 2006, 2007, 2011, 2013, 2018, 2025)
South Korea	2 (2000, 2003)	none	1 (2010)	none	none	none	none	none	none	3 (2000, 2003, 2010)
Spain	11 (1997, 1998, 2000, 2002, 2003, 2004, 2005)	none	2 (2013, 2015)	1 (2016)	1 (2022)	none	1 (2023)	none	none	16 (1997, 1998, 2000, 2002, 2003, 2004, 2005, 2013, 2015, 2016, 2022, 2023)
Sri Lanka	none	none	1 (2013)	none	none	none	none	none	none	1 (2013)
Sudan	1 (2004)	none	none	none	none	none	none	none	none	1 (2004)
Sweden	6 (1997, 1998, 2001, 2002)	none	2 (2012, 2014)	2 (2017, 2018)	1 (2022)	none	1 (2023)	none	none	12 (1997, 1998, 2001, 2002, 2012, 2014, 2017, 2018, 2022, 2023)
Switzerland	5 (1998, 2000, 2001, 2005, 2007)	2 (2008, 2009)	6 (2010, 2011, 2012, 2013, 2014, 2016)	3 (2017, 2018, 2019)	none	none	1 (2024)	1 (2025)	none	18 (1998, 2000, 2001, 2005, 2007, 2008, 2009, 2010, 2011, 2012, 2013, 2014, 2016, 2017, 2018, 2019, 2024, 2025)
Syria	1 (2001)	none	none	none	none	none	none	none	none	1 (2001)
Trinidad and Tobago	none	1 (2009)	none	none	none	none	none	none	none	1 (2009)
Turkey	3 (2004, 2006)	none	3 (2010, 2014, 2015)	1 (2017)	none	none	none	2 (2025, 2026)	1 (2026)	10 (2004, 2006, 2010, 2014, 2015, 2017, 2025, 2026)
Uganda	none	1 (2007)	none	none	none	none	none	none	none	1 (2007)
Ukraine	none	none	none	none	4 (2022)	none	2 (2022, 2024)	3 (2025, 2026)	1 (2026)	10 (2022, 2024, 2025, 2026)
United Arab Emirates	1 (2006)	1 (2008)	3 (2010, 2012, 2013)	none	2 (2022)	none	1 (2023)	2 (2024, 2026)	none	10 (2006, 2008, 2010, 2012, 2013, 2022, 2023, 2024, 2026)
United States	23 (1997, 1998, 1999, 2000, 2001, 2002, 2003, 2004, 2005, 2006, 2007)	7 (2007, 2008, 2009)	10 (2010, 2011, 2012, 2013, 2014, 2015, 2016)	4 (2016, 2017, 2018)	2 (2019, 2021)	1 (2022)	2 (2023)	5 (2024, 2025)	1 (2026)	55 (1997, 1998, 1999, 2000, 2001, 2002, 2003, 2004, 2005, 2006, 2007, 2008, 2009, 2010, 2011, 2012, 2013, 2014, 2015, 2016, 2017, 2018, 2019, 2021, 2022, 2023, 2024, 2025, 2026)
Vatican City	2 (2003, 2005)	1 (2009)	none	none	none	none	none	1 (2025)	none	4 (2003, 2005, 2009, 2025)
Vietnam	none	none	1 (2015)	none	none	none	none	none	none	1 (2015)

== Margaret Thatcher (1979–1990) ==
In September 1982, Thatcher became the first incumbent British Prime Minister to visit China. In February 1984, Thatcher became the first incumbent British Prime Minister to visit Hungary. In April 1985, Thatcher became the first incumbent British Prime Minister to visit Malaysia. In May 1986, Thatcher became the first incumbent British Prime Minister to visit South Korea. and Israel. In September 1988, Thatcher became the first incumbent British Prime Minister to visit Spain. In November 1988, Thatcher became the first incumbent British Prime Minister to visit Poland.

== Tony Blair (1997–2007) ==
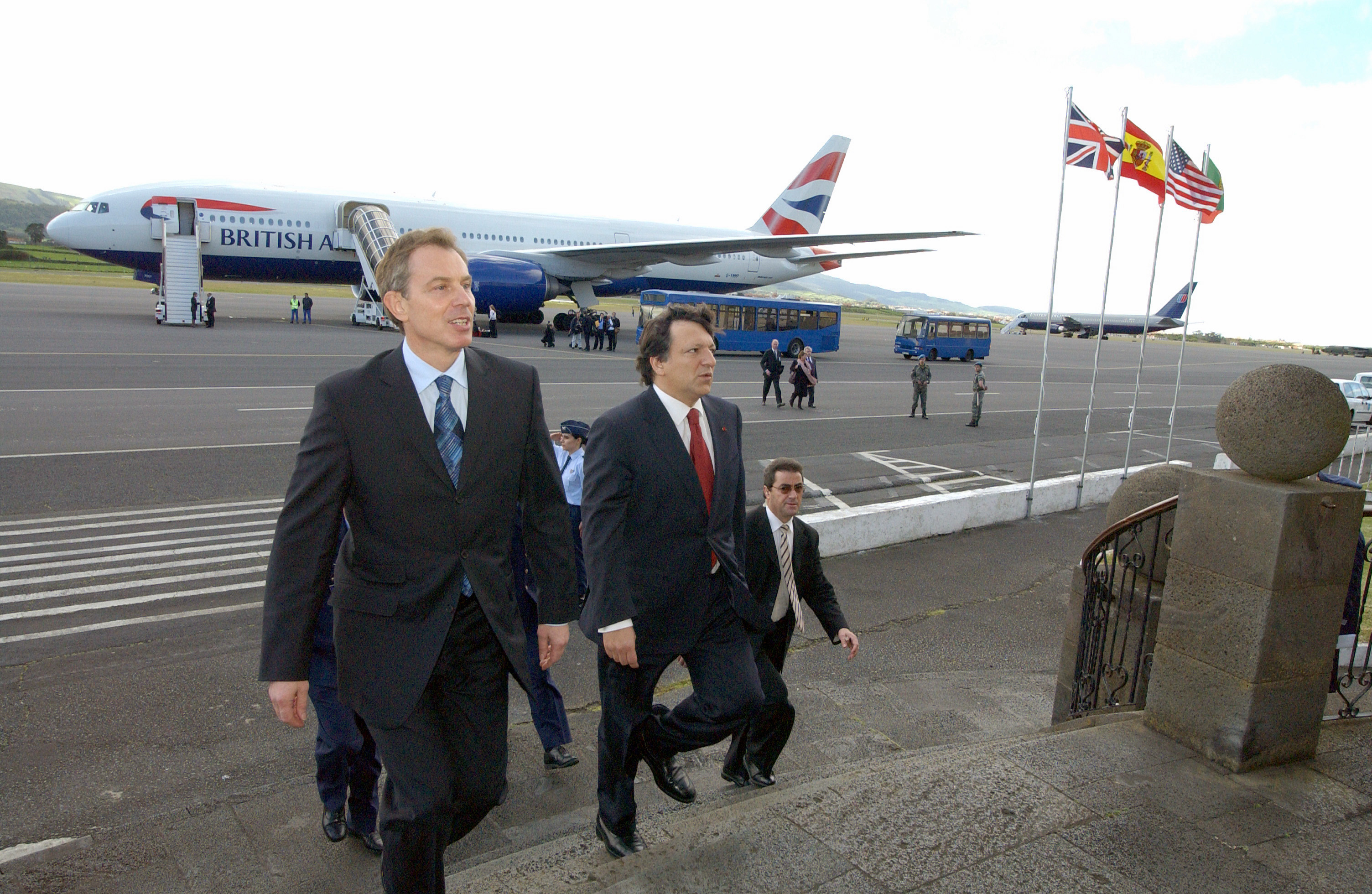
Prime Minister Tony Blair with Portuguese Prime Minister José Manuel Barroso, March 2003.

Tony Blair made 208 trips to 68 countries and territories during his premiership. In November 1998, Blair became the first British Prime Minister to address the Irish parliament. In April 1999, Blair became the first incumbent British Prime Minister to visit Chicago. In July 2001, Blair became the first incumbent British Prime Minister to visit Brazil. In August 2001, Blair became the first incumbent British Prime Minister to visit Argentina and Mexico. In October 2001, Blair became the first incumbent British Prime Minister to visit Syria. In January 2002, Blair became the first incumbent British Prime Minister to visit Afghanistan. In February 2002, Blair became the first incumbent British Prime Minister to visit Senegal. In March 2004, Blair became the first incumbent British Prime Minister to visit Libya post-independence. In October 2004, Blair became the first incumbent British Prime Minister to visit Sudan post-independence. In March 2006, Blair became the first incumbent British Prime Minister to visit Slovakia. In September 2006, Blair became the first incumbent British Prime Minister to visit Lebanon.

== Gordon Brown (2007–2010) ==
Countries visited by Gordon Brown during his premiership

Gordon Brown made 63 trips to 30 countries during his premiership. In July 2008, Brown became the first British Prime Minister to address the Knesset in Israel. Brown became the first incumbent British Prime Minister to visit Chile.

== David Cameron (2010–2016) ==
Countries visited by David Cameron during his premiership

David Cameron made 148 trips to 62 countries (in addition to visiting the Occupied Palestinian Territories) during his premiership. In April 2012, Cameron became the first incumbent British Prime Minister to visit Myanmar. In January 2013, Cameron became the first incumbent British Prime Minister to visit Algeria post-independence. In July 2013, Cameron became the first incumbent British Prime Minister to visit Kazakhstan. In July 2015, Cameron became the first incumbent British Prime Minister to visit Vietnam.

== Theresa May (2016–2019) ==
Countries visited by Theresa May during her premiership

Theresa May made 77 trips to 33 countries during her premiership.

== Boris Johnson (2019–2022) ==
Countries visited by Boris Johnson during his premiership

Boris Johnson made 26 trips to 18 countries during his premiership.

== Liz Truss (2022) ==
Countries visited by Liz Truss during her premiership

Liz Truss made two overseas trips to two countries during her premiership.

== Rishi Sunak (2022–2024) ==
Countries visited by Rishi Sunak during his premiership

Rishi Sunak made 24 international trips to 22 countries during his premiership. In June 2023, Sunak became the first incumbent British Prime Minister to visit Moldova.

== Keir Starmer (2024–2026) ==
Countries visited by Keir Starmer during his premiership

Keir Starmer made 49 international trips to 33 countries during his premiership. In October 2024, Starmer became the first incumbent British Prime Minister to visit Samoa. In November 2024, Starmer became the first incumbent British Prime Minister to visit Azerbaijan. In February 2025, Starmer became the first Prime Minister since the UK left the European Union to address the European Council. In May 2026, Starmer became the first incumbent British Prime Minister to visit Armenia post-independence.

== Andy Burnham (since 2026) ==
Countries visited by Andy Burnham during his premiership: (20 November 2026)

Andy Burnham made 7 international trips to 6 countries during his premiership.

== First visit by country ==
Countries by first incumbent British prime ministerial visit
Country	Date	Prime Minister	Ref.
United States	4 October 1929	Ramsay MacDonald	
Iceland	16 August 1941	Winston Churchill	
Jamaica	1 April 1961 (Note: First official visit to Jamaica, however Macmillan was the third British prime minister to visit Jamaica while in office. Additionally, Jamaica was a Crown colony during the visit.)	Harold Macmillan	
Japan	18 September 1972	Edward Heath	
China	22 September 1982	Margaret Thatcher	
Hungary	2 February 1984	Margaret Thatcher	
Malaysia	5 April 1985	Margaret Thatcher	
South Korea	2 May 1986	Margaret Thatcher	
Israel	25 May 1986	Margaret Thatcher	
Spain	22 September 1988	Margaret Thatcher	
Poland	2 November 1988	Margaret Thatcher	
Colombia	9 June 1992	John Major	
Brazil	30 July 2001	Tony Blair	
Argentina	1 August 2001	Tony Blair	
Mexico	2 August 2001	Tony Blair	
Syria	31 October 2001	Tony Blair	
Afghanistan	8 January 2002	Tony Blair	
Senegal	10 February 2002	Tony Blair	
Libya	25 March 2004 (Note: First visit post-independence)	Tony Blair	
Sudan	6 October 2004	Tony Blair	
Slovakia	10 March 2006	Tony Blair	
Lebanon	11 September 2006	Tony Blair	
Chile	27 March 2009	Gordon Brown	
Myanmar	13 April 2012	David Cameron	
Algeria	30 January 2013	David Cameron	
Kazakhstan	4 July 2013	David Cameron	
Vietnam	29 July 2015	David Cameron	
Moldova	1 June 2023	Rishi Sunak	
Samoa	24 October 2024	Keir Starmer	
Azerbaijan	12 November 2024	Keir Starmer	
Armenia	3 May 2026	Keir Starmer	

== See also ==
- Foreign relations of the United Kingdom
- List of international trips made by foreign secretaries of the United Kingdom
