= Stonehill International School =

International Baccalaureate World school in Bangalore

Stonehill International School Bangalore
- Tarahunise Post, Jalahobli, Bangalore, Karnataka; India

Information
- Type: Private, International, Co-educational, Day & Boarding
- Established: 2008
- Head of school: Joe Lumsden
- Grades: K-12
- Enrolment: 650
- Student to teacher ratio: 20:1
- Education system: International Baccalaureate (www.ibo.org)
- Campus size: 34 acres
- Mascot: Tiger
- Accreditation: Council of International Schools (CIS) & New England Association of Schools & Colleges (NEASC)
- Website: www.stonehill.in

Stonehill International School is a private, secular, coeducational day and boarding school for students aged three to eighteen. English is the medium of instruction throughout.

The school is operated by the Stonehill Education Foundation, within the Embassy Group, and is a non-profit company registered in India under Section 25 of the Companies Act. It operates under a ‘no-objection’ certificate issued by the Karnataka Government Secretariat Education Department. The Governing Council (GC) of the Stonehill Education Foundation acts with the authority of the Directors of the Foundation.

The school is accredited by the Council of International Schools (CIS) and by the New England Association of Schools and Colleges (NEASC). It is authorised to offer the International Baccalaureate Primary Years Programme (PYP), the Middle Years Programme (MYP), and the Diploma Programme (DP). Stonehill is a member of the Association of International Schools in India (TAISI), the East Asia Regional Council of Schools (EARCOS), and the Australian Boarding Schools’ Association (ABSA).

The school is located north of Bangalore on the way to Kempegowda International Airport. It is a two-story facility purpose-built on 34 acres of land. A fleet of buses transports students to and from school.

Students at Stonehill come from a wide variety of backgrounds, including expatriate children, long-term residents of Bangalore, and children of returning Indian families. At any time, the school has students of more than thirty nationalities.

== History ==
Stonehill International School was founded in 2008. The first classes began in September 2008 with 18 students. IB Diploma Programme (DP) authorisation was granted in 2010, PYP in 2011, and MYP in 2012. The boarding programme began in 2014. Infrastructure developments include the Multipurpose Hall (2018), STEM Block and Arts Centre (2019), and a new library (2022). The school is governed by a five-member Governing Council under the Stonehill Education Foundation.

== Campus and facilities ==
The campus spans 34 acres and includes:

- STEM building and Makerspace for design, robotics, and digital arts
- Arts Centre and auditorium
- 25-metre swimming pool
- Synthetic-turf football field, tennis courts, volleyball and basketball courts
- Indoor multipurpose sports hall
- Boarding houses with twin/quad rooms, study areas, cafeteria, fitness centre, and 24-hour medical supervision

Technology is integrated across the curriculum, with iPads in Primary School and laptops required in MYP/DP.

== Curriculum ==
Stonehill offers the full IB continuum: PYP, MYP, DP, and the IB Career-related Programme (IBCP) for Grades 11–12. The school emphasises technology integration, project-based learning, and language instruction. Non-native English speakers may participate in English as an Additional Language (EAL) programmes.

== Student body ==
The school has approximately 650 students from over 35 nationalities. Faculty members come from more than 15 nationalities. Average class size is 15 in Primary and 16–18 in Secondary. Approximately 20% of secondary students are boarders. The student–teacher ratio is approximately 20:1.

== Extracurricular activities ==
Stonehill offers a variety of sports, arts, and cultural programs:

- Sports: swimming, tennis, volleyball, basketball, football, equestrian
- Arts: music (private lessons available), drama, visual arts, performing arts
- Academic: Model United Nations (MUN), science and robotics clubs
- Annual events: cultural festivals, Founder’s Day run, school concerts

== Academic performance and university placements ==
Stonehill reports IB Diploma results above the global average, with all graduating students receiving university offers.

2025 graduates received university offers from 18 countries, including 39 offers from top-50 global universities. Fields of study included engineering, computer science, biomedical sciences, economics, psychology, design, anthropology, finance, and music. Scholarships totalled USD 1.93 million.

2024 graduates received offers from 24 countries, including Imperial College London, London School of Economics, New York University, University of Toronto, University of Melbourne, and Erasmus University Rotterdam. Scholarships totalled USD 2.7 million.
