= List of international trips made by James Cleverly as Foreign Secretary =

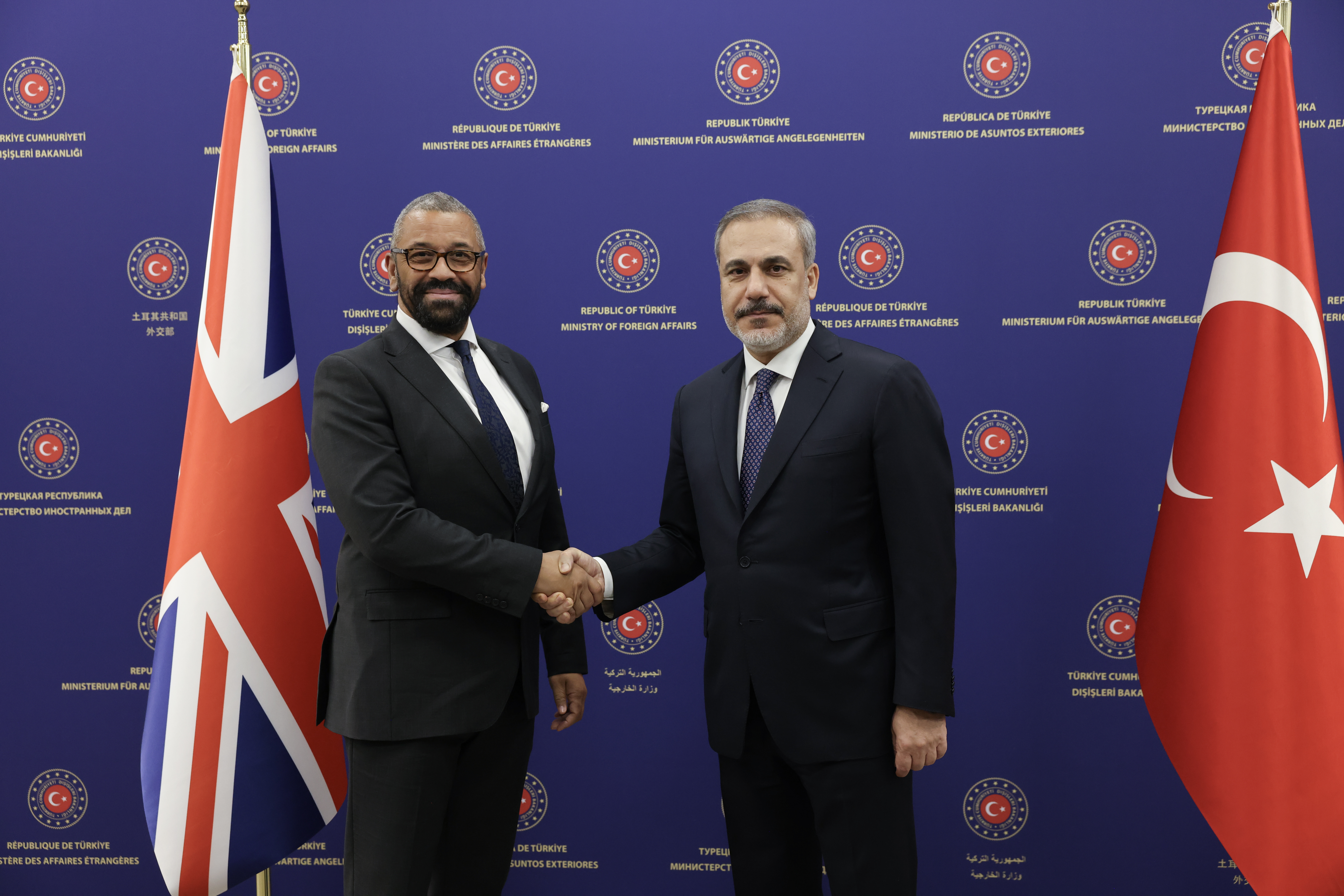
Cleverly with Turkish Foreign Minister Hakan Fidan in Ankara, Turkey, 13 September 2023

This is a list of international visits undertaken by James Cleverly (in office from September 2022 to November 2023) while serving as the Foreign Secretary, first for Liz Truss and then for Rishi Sunak. The list includes both private travel and official visits. The list includes only foreign travel which the Foreign Secretary made during his tenure in the position.

He was the first British Foreign Secretary to visit either Papua New Guinea or the Solomon Islands.

== Summary ==
Cleverly visited at least 51 countries and territories during his tenure as Foreign Secretary. The number of visits per country or territory where Cleverly traveled are:

- One visit to Albania, Australia, Bahrain, Brazil, Canada, Chile, China, Colombia, Ethiopia, Estonia, Georgia, Ghana, Indonesia, Italy, Jamaica, Jordan, Kazakhstan, Kuwait, Lithuania, Malta, Moldova, New Zealand, Nigeria, Norway, Palestinian National Authority, Papua New Guinea, the Philippines, Poland, Romania, Samoa, Saudi Arabia, Sierra Leone, Singapore, Solomon Islands, South Korea, Spain, Sweden, UAE and Zambia.
- Two visits to Egypt, India, Israel, Kenya, Turkey and Ukraine.
- Three visits to Germany, Japan and Qatar
- Four visits to Belgium and France.
- Six visits to the United States.

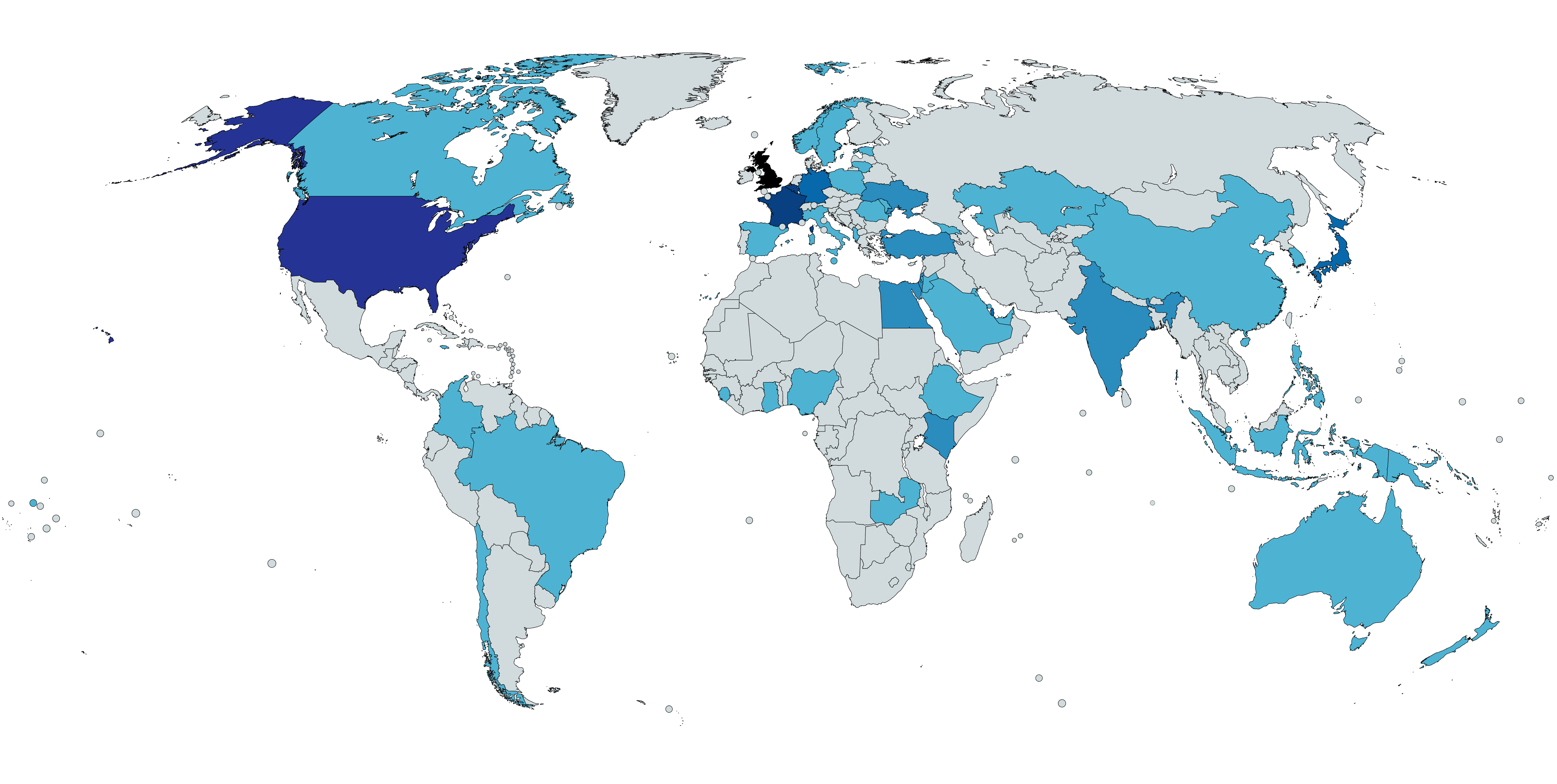
Map of international trips made by James Cleverly as Foreign Secretary: United Kingdom 5+ visits 4 visits 3 visits 2 visits 1 visit

== Table ==
	Country	Locations	Dates	Details
1	USA	New York	20–22 September 2022	Met with US Secretary of State Antony Blinken and addressed the UN General Assembly.
2	Japan	Tokyo	25–27 September 2022	Attended the State Funeral of former Prime Minister Shinzo Abe and meet Foreign Minister Yoshimasa Hayashi.
2	South Korea	Seoul	27–28 September 2022	Met with President Yoon Suk-yeol and visit the Joint Security Area of the Demilitarised Zone (DMZ).
2	Singapore	Singapore	28–30 September 2022	Met with Deputy Prime Minister Lawrence Wong and delivered a keynote speech at the Milken Asia Summit.
3	India	Mumbai, New Delhi	27–30 October 2022	Visited Mumbai to pay his respects to those who lost their lives in the city's terror attack at the Taj Palace Hotel in 2008. Subsequently traveled to New Delhi to meet his counterpart Dr S. Jaishankar.
4	Germany	Münster, Berlin	2–4 November 2022	Attended a meeting of the G7 Foreign Ministers.
5	Egypt	Sharm El Sheikh, Cairo	6–7 November 2022	Attended COP27, and, among others, met with John Kerry, the U.S. Special Presidential Envoy for Climate.
6	France	Paris	10–11 November 2022	Met with his French counterpart Catherine Colonna and discussed the planning for the 2023 UK-France summit (which occurred in March 2023). Cooperation on, bio-diversity, energy, migration, joint support for Ukraine, the Indo-Pacific and Iran was agreed.
7	Bahrain	Manama	18–19 November 2022	Attended the Manama Dialogue.
7	Qatar	Doha	20–21 November 2022	Attended the 2022 FIFA World Cup, despite some controversy over his attendance regarding Qatar's stance on human rights.
8	Ukraine	Kyiv	23–25 November 2022	Traveled to Ukraine to announce an additional £3 million of support for Ukraine and met with President Zelenskyy and Foreign Minister Dmytro Kuleba.
9	Romania	Bucharest	29–30 November 2022	Attended the NATO Foreign ministers meeting and emt with Secretary general Jens Stoltenberg.
9	Poland	Łódź	31 November – 1 December 2022	Attended the OSCE ministerial council.
10	Kenya	Nairobi	6–7 December 2022	Broke ground at the construction of the new Nairobi railways station (railway city), backed by £80 million of UK investment, and announced £650m illion for the Afrcan Development Fund over the next 3 years. Also met with Kenyan Foreign Minister Alfred Mutua.
10	Ethiopia	Addis Ababa, Semera and Hawassa	8–9 December 2022	Discussed the end of the Tigray war with the Ethiopian government and oversaw the distribution of aid to the region.
11	Spain	Madrid	14 December 2022	Met with Spanish Foreign Minister José Manuel Albares to discuss ongoing UK-Spain negotiations with respect to the status of Gibraltar post-Brexit.
11	Belgium	Brussels	15 December 2022	To discuss UK-EU bilat.
12	United States	Washington, D.C.	17–18 January 2023	Met with US Secretary of State Antony Blinken to deepen diplomatic, trade, intelligence and security ties and to discuss support for Ukraine. .
12	Canada	Toronto	18–19 January 2023	Traveled to Toronto with Antony Blinken for a round table discussion with Canadian Foreign Minister Mélanie Joly to discuss joint support for Ukraine.
13	Italy	Rome	8-9 February 2023	Attended the UK-Italy Pontignano Forum and bilateral programme. .
13	Malta	Valletta	9-10 February 2023	Met with his Maltese counterpart Ian Borg and signed the new UK-Malta bilateral cooperation framework.
14	Belgium	Brussels	17 February 2023	Held discussions on the Windsor Framework with EU officials.
14	Germany	Munich	18 February 2023	Attended the Munich Security Conference.
15	USA	New York	23-24 February 2023	Attended a UN Security Council meeting on Ukraine.
16	India	New Delhi	28 February-3 March 2023	Attended the 2023 G20 New Delhi summit, alongside Prime Minister Rishi Sunak.
17	Sierra Leone	Bo, Freetown	7-9 March 2023	Visited his mother's home town of Bo, touring a hospital and a secondary school. Following this he visited Freetown and met with his counterpart David Francis, foreign minister of Sierra Leone and signed a UK-Sierra Leone memorandum of understanding establishing Annual joint Trade and Investment dialogues and strengthening the bilateral economic relationship.
17	France	Paris	9-10 March 2023	Attended the 35th UK-France summit, accompanying Prime Minister Rishi Sunak.
18	Moldova	Chisinau	15 March 2023	Visited Moldova and announced UK government plans to bolster Moldova's resilience to this malign interference through an additional £10 million of funding for economic and governance reforms, including in the energy sector.
18	Georgia	Tbilisi	16-17 March 2023	Visited Georgia to discuss Russian subversion and provision of £500,000 aimed at creating an environment for free and fair elections in 2024, protecting them from external interference.
18	Kazakhstan	Astana	18 March 2023	Met with President Kassym-Jomart Tokayev and discussed ways to strengthen the UK-Kazakhstan strategic partnership.
19	Germany	Berlin, Hamburg	29-31 March 2023	Visited Germany accompanying King Charles III as part of the State visit by Charles III to Germany, his first official State Visit as monarch.
20	Belgium	Brussels	4-5 April 2023	Attended NATO Foreign Ministers Meeting.
21	Japan	Tokyo	15-18 April 2023	Attended the G7 Foreign Ministers meeting, to promote a “free and open” Indo-Pacific. This trip came in the context of an updated UK integrated review of defence and security policy in March 2023 that reinforced a post-Brexit “tilt” towards the IndoPacific as a “permanent pillar” of British foreign policy.
21	Papua New Guinea	Port Moresby	19 April 2023	Met with Foreign Minister Justin Tkatchenko and Prime Minister Marape. Also visited the Fleming Fund-backed hospital in Port Moresby, visit the Grass Skirt Project which promotes women and girls’ rights, and lay a wreath at the Bomana Commonwealth War Cemetery.
21	Solomon Islands	Honiara	19 April 2023	Met with Prime Minister Manasseh Sogavare and Foreign Minister Manel.
21	Samoa	Apia	20-21 April 2023	Traveled to Samoa with New Zealand Foreign Minister Nanaia Mahuta and met with Samoan Prime Minister Fiamē Naomi Mataʻafa.
21	New Zealand	Wellington	21-22 April 2023	Traveled on to New Zealand with Foreign Minister Nanaia Mahuta and met with Prime Minister Chris Hipkins.
21	USA	Washington, D.C.	8-11 May 2023	Met with US Secretary of State Antony Blinken and leading members of Congress to discuss the US and UK's long-term commitment to Ukraine.
22	Jamaica	Kingston	18-19 May 2023	Met with Jamaican Prime Minister Andrew Holness and attended the UK-Caribbean forum.
22	Colombia	Cartagena, Bogota	19-21 May 2023	Visited Latin America to make 200 years of British diplomatic relations with the nations of the region. In Colombia announced new UK support and funding for peace and tackling climate change by protecting the Amazon. Visited the Amazon frontier region of Guaviare to see how UK-funded projects are preventing deforestation and helping former combatants rebuild their lives through eco-tourism.
22	Chile	Santiago	21-22 May 2023	Traveled to Santiago and gave a speech setting out the UK's approach to Latin America and like-minded powers around the world.
22	Brazil	Manaus, Brazilia	22-25 May 2023	Visited the Brazilian national congress and signed a wide-ranging climate partnership with Brazil on green and inclusive growth building on agreements made between Prime Minister Rishi Sunak and Brazilian President Lula Da Silva in London earlier in May 2023.
23	Estonia	Tallinn, Ämari Air Base	30 May 2023	Met with members of the new Estonian Government to highlight the UK's role as a steadfast security partner. Visited the Royal Navy's amphibious flagship, HMS Albion, during a 2-month Baltic sea deployment, watched UK Typhoon's performing NATO air policing and visited a school for Ukrainian refugees.
23	Norway	Oslo	1 June 2023	Attended an informal meeting of NATO Foreign Ministers.
24	Ukraine	Kyiv	6-7 June 2023	Visited Kyiv and met with President Zelenskyy and Foreign Minister Kuleba, discussed further support to Ukraine prior to the UK hosted Ukraine recovery conference in London.
24	France	Paris	7-8 June 2023	Chaired the 2023 OECD Ministerial Council Meeting.
25	Sweden	Visby	27-28 June 2023	Visited the Swedish island of Visby to hold discussions on Swedish accession to NATO with Foreign Minister Tobias Billström and view Swedish submarines on exercise.
26	Belgium	Brussels	3 July 2023	Co-chaired the Withdrawal Agreement Joint Committee alongside EU Vice President Maroš Šefčovič. Bilateral meetings with European Parliament President Roberta Metsola and NATO Secretary General Jens Stoltenberg.
26	Lithuania	Vilnius	11-12 July 2023	Attended NATO Foreign Ministers Meeting as part of the 2023 Vilnius NATO summit, accompanying Prime Minister Rishi Sunak.
27	Indonesia	Jakarta	13-14 July 2023	Attended the ASEAN Foreign ministers meeting and met with Indonesia President Joko Widodo, announcing up to £25 million in funding to support ASEAN nations’ economic growth and reduce poverty.
28	USA	New York, Aspen	17-19 July 2023	Attended the UN Security Council and the Aspen Security Forum.
29	Qatar	Doha	25 July 2023	Met with the Prime Minister and Foreign Minister, Sheikh Mohammed bin Abdulrahman Al Thani.
29	Kuwait	Kuwait City	26 July 2023	Met the Crown Prince, Sheikh Meshal Al-Ahmad Al-Jaber Al-Sabah.
29	Jordan	Amman	27 July 2023	Met with Deputy Prime Minister and Foreign Minister Ayman Safadi and announced up to £1.5 million to support initiatives for women and girls.
30	Ghana	Accra	31 July 2023	Announced a pledge a £40 million boost for Ghanaian businesses.
30	Nigeria	Abuja, Lagos	1-2 August 2023	Met with Nigerian president Bola Ahmed Tinubu and National Security Advisor Mallam Nuhu Ribadu and announced major new UK investment in Nigerian agriculture.
30	Zambia	Lusaka	2-3 August 2023	Toured the Mimbula Copper Mine and signed a new agreement on critical minerals, as well as new green investment targets.
31	Australia	Sydney	18-20 August 2023	Attended the Women's World Cup final, where England played Spain. He also met with Australian Foreign Minister Penny Wong.
32	Philippines	Manila	28-29 August 2023	Met with President Bongbong Marcos and Foreign Secretary Enrique Manalo. Toured the BRP Melchora Aquino.
32	China	Beijing	29-30 August 2023	Met with Chinese Vice President Han Zheng and Chinese Foreign Minister and Director of the Office of the Central Foreign Affairs Commission Wang Yi.
33	Israel	Jerusalem	11-12 September 2023	Spoke at a security conference and met with Foreign Minister Eli Cohen, Prime Minister Benjamin Netanyahu.
33	Palestinian National Authority	Jalazone	12 September 2023	Visited Jalazone Refugee Camp and met with Prime Minister Mohammad Shtayyeh.
33	Turkey	Ankara	13-14 September 2023	Met with Foreign Minster Fidan. Held high-level talks aimed at enhancing trade, protecting regional security and cooperating to tackle the shared security challenges of counter terrorism, serious organised crime and illegal migration.
34	USA	New York	18-19 September 2023	Attended the UN General Assembly.
35	France	Paris, Bordeaux	20-22 September 2023	Accompanied Charles III on the King's first state visit to France as monarch.
36	Israel	Tel Aviv, Jerusalem, Ofakim	11 October 2023	Less than a month after his first visit to Israel as Foreign Secretary, Hamas launched the October 7 attacks and the Gaza war began. He traveled to the region to meet with President Herzog and Foreign Minister Eli Cohen and visit the site of the 7 October attacks (the first Foreign Minister to do so).
37	Albania	Tirana	16 October 2023	Visited Tirana to attend a Summit of Western Balkan and European leaders (the annual Berlin process summit). The visit was also used to highlight the growing UK-Albania partnership on migration and the deployment of 600 UK troops to the NATO peacekeeping mission in Kosovo.
38	Egypt	Cairo	18-19 October 2023	Traveled to the region to meet his Egyptian counterpart and discuss the Gaza War, including to push for agreement on humanitarian access to Gaza, the release of British hostages and foreign nationals, and securing safe passage for British nationals to leave Gaza.
38	Qatar	Doha	19-20 October 2023	Traveled to the region to meet his Qatari counterpart and discuss the Gaza War, including to push for agreement on humanitarian access to Gaza, the release of British hostages and foreign nationals, and securing safe passage for British nationals to leave Gaza.
38	Turkey	Ankara	20-2 October 2023	Traveled to the region to meet his Egyptian counterpart and discuss the Gaza War, including to push for agreement on humanitarian access to Gaza, the release of British hostages and foreign nationals, and securing safe passage for British nationals to leave Gaza..
39	UAE	Abu Dhabi	30 October 2023	Met with his counterpart Sheikh Abdullah bin Zayed Al Nahyan, and discussed the ongoing Gaza War and wider Middle Eastern issues.
40	Kenya	Nairobi	30 October-1 November 2023	Visited Kenya accompanying King Charles III as part of the State visit by Charles III to Kenya, his first official State Visit as monarch to a Commonwealth nation.
41	Japan	Tokyo	7-8 November 2023	Traveled to Japan to attend the G7 Foreign Ministers meeting. Also co-chaired the fifth UK-Japan 2+2 foreign and defence ministerial meeting with UK Defence Secretary Grant Shapps and Japanese Minister for Foreign Affairs Yōko Kamikawa and Defence Minister Minoru Kihara.
41	Saudi Arabia	Riyadh	8-9 November 2023	Met with meet with foreign ministers from the Middle East, who were gathering in Saudi Arabia ahead of a League of Arab States emergency meeting on the ongoing Gaza War.

== See also ==
- List of international prime ministerial trips made by Liz Truss
- List of international prime ministerial trips made by Rishi Sunak
- List of international trips made by foreign secretaries of the United Kingdom
