= List of international prime ministerial trips made by David Cameron =

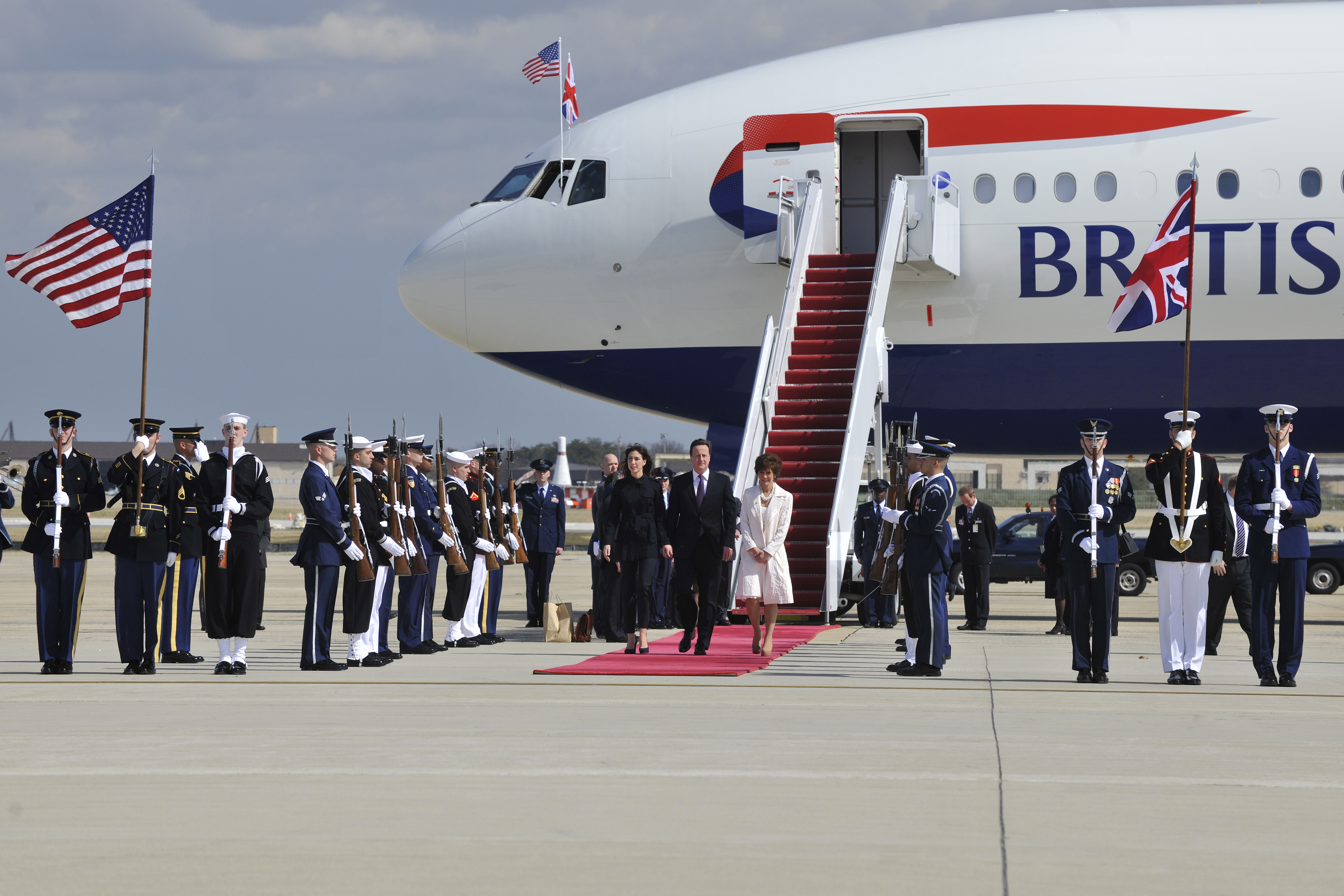
Prime Minister David Cameron, with his wife Samantha Cameron, March 2012.

This is the list of international prime ministerial trips made by David Cameron, who served as Prime Minister of the United Kingdom from 11 May 2010 until his resignation on 13 July 2016. David Cameron made 148 trips to 62 countries (in addition to visiting the Occupied Palestinian Territories) during his premiership.

== Summary ==
The number of visits per country where Cameron travelled are:

- One: Algeria, Austria, Brazil, Bulgaria, Denmark, Egypt, Finland, Grenada, Hungary, Iceland, Ireland, Israel, Jamaica, Kazakhstan, Kuwait, Lebanon, Liberia, Lithuania, Luxembourg, Mexico, Myanmar, Nigeria, Norway, Oman, Palestine, Qatar, Romania, Slovakia, Slovenia, South Korea, Sri Lanka, and Vietnam
- Two: Australia, Canada, China, Indonesia, Japan, Jordan, Latvia, Libya, Malaysia, Malta, Pakistan, Portugal, Singapore, South Africa, Spain, and Sweden
- Three: the Czech Republic, India, the Netherlands, Russia, Saudi Arabia, Turkey, and the United Arab Emirates
- Five: Italy and Poland
- Six: Switzerland
- Nine: Afghanistan
- Ten: the United States
- Twelve: Germany
- Eighteen: France
- Fifty: Belgium

World map highlighting the 62 countries visited by David Cameron during his premiership: United Kingdom One visit Two visits Three visits Four visits Five visits Seven or more visits

== 2010 ==
| # | Country | Location | Date | Details | Image |
|---|---|---|---|---|---|
| 1 | France | Paris | 20 May | Cameron met with President Nicolas Sarkozy. | |
| 1 | Germany | Berlin | 21 May | Cameron met with Chancellor Angela Merkel. | |
| 2 | United Arab Emirates | Abu Dhabi | 9–12 June | Cameron met with President Sheikh Khalifa bin Zayed Al Nahyan. | |
| 2 | Afghanistan | Camp Bastion | 9–12 June | Cameron met with President Hamid Karzai and visited troops. | |
| 3 | Belgium | Brussels | 16–17 June | Cameron attended the European Council summit. | |
| 4 | Canada | Huntsville, Toronto | 24–27 June | Cameron attended the G8 summit in Huntsville and the G20 summit in Toronto. | |
| 5 | United States | Washington, D.C., New York City | 19–22 July | Cameron met with President Barack Obama, the Mayor of New York and Inward investors. | |
| 6 | Turkey | Ankara | 26–27 July | Cameron met with President Abdullah Gül and spoke in favour of accession of Turkey to the European Union. | |
| 6 | India | Bangalore | 28–30 July | Cameron discussed trade and met with Prime Minister Manmohan Singh. He travelled with Business Secretary Vince Cable. | |
| 7 | Italy | Rome | 4–5 August | Cameron met with Prime Minister Silvio Berlusconi. | |
| 8 | Belgium | Brussels | 15–16 September | Cameron attended the European Council summit. | |
| 9 | Belgium | Brussels | 28–29 October | Cameron attended the European Council summit. | |
| 10 | China | Beijing | 8–12 November | Cameron made a Trade and Bilateral visit. | |
| 10 | South Korea | Seoul | 8–12 November | Cameron attended the G20 summit. | |
| 11 | Portugal | Lisbon | 19–20 November | Cameron attended the NATO summit. | |
| 12 | Switzerland | Zürich | 30 November – 2 December | Cameron visited Zürich in connection with the England 2018 FIFA World Cup bid. | |
| 13 | Afghanistan | Camp Bastion | 5–7 December | Cameron visited troops and held bilateral talks with President Hamid Karzai. | |
| 14 | Belgium | Brussels | 16–17 December | Cameron attended the European Council summit. | |

== 2011 ==
| # | Country | Location | Date | Details | Image |
|---|---|---|---|---|---|
| 15 | Switzerland | Davos | 27–29 January | Cameron attended the World Economic Forum annual meeting. | |
| 16 | Belgium | Brussels | 4–5 February | Cameron attended the European Council summit. | |
| 16 | Germany | Munich | 4–5 February | Cameron attended the 47th Munich Security Conference. | |
| 17 | Egypt | | 21–24 February | Cameron made bilateral visits. | |
| 17 | Kuwait | | 21–24 February | Cameron made bilateral visits. | |
| 17 | Qatar | | 21–24 February | Cameron made bilateral visits. | |
| 17 | Oman | | 21–24 February | Cameron made bilateral visits. | |
| 18 | Belgium | Brussels | 11 March | Cameron attended an extraordinary European Council summit. | |
| 19 | France | Paris | 19 March | Cameron attended the Libya conference. | |
| 20 | Belgium | Brussels | 24–25 March | Cameron attended the European Council summit. | |
| 21 | Italy | Gioia del Colle | 4–5 April | Cameron visited UK forces personnel. | |
| 21 | Pakistan | Islamabad | 4–5 April | Cameron took part in a bilateral visit. | |
| 22 | Ireland | Dublin | 18 May | Cameron travelled to Dublin as part of Her Majesty's State Visit. | |
| 23 | France | Deauville | 26 May | Cameron attended the G8 summit. | |
| 24 | Czech Republic | Prague | 23 June | Cameron took part in a bilateral visit. | |
| 25 | Belgium | Brussels | 24 June | Cameron attended the European Council summit. | |
| 26 | Afghanistan | Camp Bastion | 3–5 July | Cameron met troops, local leaders and held a bilateral meeting with President Hamid Karzai. | |
| 27 | South Africa | Johannesburg | 17–19 July | Cameron met with President Jacob Zuma, business leaders and Archbishop Desmond Tutu. | |
| 27 | Nigeria | Lagos | 17–19 July | Cameron met with President Goodluck Jonathan and business leaders. | |
| 28 | France | Paris | 1 September | Cameron attended a multilateral summit on Libya. | |
| 29 | Libya | Tripoli, Benghazi | 15 September | Cameron met with members of the National Transitional Council. | |
| 30 | Russia | Moscow | 11–12 September | Cameron met with Prime Minister Vladimir Putin, President Dmitry Medvedev and business leaders. | |
| 31 | United States | New York City | 21–22 September | Cameron attended the 66th United Nations General Assembly and held bilateral meetings. | |
| 31 | Canada | Ottawa | 21–22 September | Cameron met with Prime Minister Stephen Harper. | |
| 32 | Belgium | Brussels | 23 October | Cameron attended the European Council summit. | |
| 33 | Belgium | Brussels | 26–30 October | Cameron attended the European Council summit. | |
| 33 | Australia | Perth | 26–30 October | Cameron attended the 2011 Commonwealth Heads of Government Meeting. | |
| 34 | France | Cannes | 3–4 November | Cameron attended the G20 summit. | |
| 35 | Belgium | Brussels | 18 November | Cameron met with President of the European Commission José Manuel Barroso and President of the European Council Herman Van Rompuy. | |
| 35 | Germany | Berlin | 18 November | Cameron met with Chancellor Angela Merkel. | |
| 36 | France | Paris | 2 December | Cameron met with President Nicolas Sarkozy. | |
| 37 | Belgium | Brussels | 8–9 December | Cameron attended the European Council summit. | |
| 38 | Afghanistan | Kandahar Airfield | 19 December | Cameron met with British Forces and local leaders. | |
| 39 | Czech Republic | Prague | 23 December | Cameron attended the funeral of Václav Havel. | |

== 2012 ==
| # | Country | Location | Date | Details | Image |
|---|---|---|---|---|---|
| 40 | Saudi Arabia | Riyadh | 12 January | Cameron took part in a bilateral visit. | |
| 41 | France | Strasbourg | 25–27 January | Cameron attended a meeting of the Council of Europe. | |
| 41 | Switzerland | Davos | 25–27 January | Cameron attended the World Economic Forum annual meeting. | |
| 42 | Belgium | Brussels | 30 January | Cameron attended the European Council summit. | |
| 43 | Sweden | Stockholm | 8–9 February | Cameron attended the Nordic Future Forum. | |
| 44 | France | Paris | 17 February | Cameron attended the UK-France summit. | |
| 45 | Belgium | Brussels | 1–2 March | Cameron attended the European Council summit. | |
| 46 | United States | Washington, D.C., New York City | 13–15 March | Cameron met with President Barack Obama and attended the state dinner at the White House. | |
| 47 | Japan | Tokyo | 9–13 April | Cameron made bilateral and economic visits, including meeting with Aung San Suu Kyi after the historic by-elections | |
| 47 | Indonesia | Jakarta | 9–13 April | Cameron made bilateral and economic visits, including meeting with Aung San Suu Kyi after the historic by-elections | |
| 47 | Malaysia | Kuala Lumpur | 9–13 April | Cameron made bilateral and economic visits, including meeting with Aung San Suu Kyi after the historic by-elections | |
| 47 | Singapore | | 9–13 April | Cameron made bilateral and economic visits, including meeting with Aung San Suu Kyi after the historic by-elections | |
| 47 | Myanmar | Naypyidaw, Rangoon | 9–13 April | Cameron made bilateral and economic visits, including meeting with Aung San Suu Kyi after the historic by-elections | |
| 48 | United States | Camp David, Chicago | 18–21 May | Cameron attended the G8 summit and the NATO summit. | |
| 49 | Belgium | Brussels | 23 May | Cameron attended the European Council summit. | |
| 50 | Norway | Oslo | 6–7 June | Cameron made bilateral visits. | |
| 50 | Germany | Berlin | 6–7 June | Cameron made bilateral visits. | |
| 51 | Mexico | Los Cabos, Mexico City | 18–20 June | Cameron made a bilateral visit and attended the G20 summit. | |
| 52 | Belgium | Brussels | 28–29 June | Cameron attended the European Council summit. | |
| 53 | Afghanistan | Helmand Province | 17–19 July | Cameron met with British forces and local leaders. | |
| 54 | United States | New York City | 25–28 September | Cameron attended the 67th United Nations General Assembly. | |
| 54 | Brazil | São Paulo, Brasília, Rio de Janeiro | 25–28 September | Cameron made a bilateral and trade visit to Brazil. | |
| 55 | Belgium | Brussels | 18–19 October | Cameron attended the European Council summit. | |
| 56 | United Arab Emirates | | 5–7 November | Cameron made bilateral visits. | |
| 56 | Saudi Arabia | | 5–7 November | Cameron made bilateral visits. | |
| 56 | Jordan | | 5–7 November | Cameron made bilateral visits. | |
| 57 | Italy | Rome | 13 November | Cameron made bilateral visits. | |
| 57 | Netherlands | The Hague | 13 November | Cameron made bilateral visits. | |
| 58 | Belgium | Brussels | 22–23 November | Cameron attended the European Council summit. | |
| 59 | Belgium | Brussels | 13–14 December | Cameron attended the European Council summit. | |
| 60 | Afghanistan | Camp Bastion | 20–21 December | Cameron met with British forces and local leaders. | |

== 2013 ==
| # | Country | Location | Date | Details | Image |
|---|---|---|---|---|---|
| 61 | Switzerland | Davos | 22–25 January | Cameron attended the World Economic Forum at Davos. | |
| 62 | Algeria | Algiers | 30 January – 1 February | Cameron travelled to Algeria on the first visit to the country by a British prime minister post Independence, meeting with President Abdelaziz Bouteflika and Prime Minister Abdelmalek Sellal, attended a meeting of the UN High Level Panel in Monrovia and held bilateral meetings. | |
| 62 | Libya | Tripoli | 30 January – 1 February | Cameron travelled to Algeria on the first visit to the country by a British prime minister post Independence, meeting with President Abdelaziz Bouteflika and Prime Minister Abdelmalek Sellal, attended a meeting of the UN High Level Panel in Monrovia and held bilateral meetings. | |
| 62 | Liberia | Monrovia | 30 January – 1 February | Cameron travelled to Algeria on the first visit to the country by a British prime minister post Independence, meeting with President Abdelaziz Bouteflika and Prime Minister Abdelmalek Sellal, attended a meeting of the UN High Level Panel in Monrovia and held bilateral meetings. | |
| 63 | Belgium | Brussels | 7–8 February | Cameron attended the European Council summit. | |
| 64 | India | Mumbai, Delhi, Amritsar | 17–20 February | Cameron undertook an overseas trade mission and held bilateral meetings. | |
| 65 | Latvia | Riga | 27–28 February | Cameron attended the Northern Future Forum. | |
| 66 | Belgium | Brussels | 14–15 March | Cameron attended the European Council summit. | |
| 67 | Spain | Madrid | 8 April | Cameron held bilateral meetings. | |
| 68 | Germany | Berlin | 12–14 April | Cameron held bilateral meetings. | |
| 69 | Russia | Sochi | 10 May | Cameron held bilateral meetings. | |
| 70 | United States | Washington, D.C., Boston, New York City | 12–15 May | Cameron attended the UN High Level Panel and held bilateral meetings. | |
| 71 | Belgium | Brussels | 22 May | Cameron attended the European Council summit and held bilateral meetings. | |
| 71 | France | Paris | 22 May | Cameron attended the European Council summit and held bilateral meetings. | |
| 72 | Belgium | Brussels | 27–28 June | Cameron attended the European Council summit. | |
| 73 | Afghanistan | Kabul | 29 June – 1 July | Cameron met with British forces. | |
| 73 | Pakistan | Islamabad | 29 June – 1 July | Cameron held bilateral meetings. | |
| 73 | Kazakhstan | Atyrau, Astana | 29 June – 1 July | Cameron met with President Nursultan Nazarbayev. | |
| 74 | Russia | Saint Petersburg | 5–6 September | Cameron attended the G20 summit. | |
| 75 | Belgium | Brussels | 24–25 October | Cameron attended the European Council summit and held bilateral meetings. | |
| 76 | India | Delhi, Kolkata | 13–17 November | Cameron attended the 2013 Commonwealth Heads of Government Meeting in Colombo and held bilateral meetings. | |
| 76 | Sri Lanka | Colombo | 13–17 November | Cameron attended the 2013 Commonwealth Heads of Government Meeting in Colombo and held bilateral meetings. | |
| 76 | United Arab Emirates | Dubai, Abu Dhabi | 13–17 November | Cameron attended the 2013 Commonwealth Heads of Government Meeting in Colombo and held bilateral meetings. | |
| 77 | Lithuania | Vilnius | 28–29 November | Cameron attended the Eastern Partnership summit. | |
| 78 | China | Beijing, Shanghai, Chengdu | 1–3 December | Cameron undertook an overseas trade mission and held bilateral meetings. | |
| 79 | South Africa | Johannesburg | 9–11 December | Cameron attended the memorial service of Nelson Mandela. | |
| 80 | Afghanistan | Camp Bastion | 15–16 December | Cameron met with British forces. | |
| 81 | Belgium | Brussels, Ypres | 19–20 December | Cameron attended the European Council summit and held bilateral meetings. | |

== 2014 ==
| # | Country | Location | Date | Details | Image |
|---|---|---|---|---|---|
| 82 | Switzerland | Davos | 23–24 January | Cameron attended the World Economic Forum at Davos. | |
| 83 | Belgium | Brussels | 6 March | Cameron attended the European Council summit. | |
| 84 | Germany | Hanover | 9–10 March | Cameron attended the CeBIT trade fair. | |
| 85 | Israel; Occupied Palestinian territories | | 12–13 March | Cameron undertook a trade mission and held bilateral meetings. | |
| 86 | Belgium | Brussels | 20–21 March | Cameron attended the European Council summit. | |
| 87 | Netherlands | The Hague | 24–25 March | Cameron attended the Nuclear Security Summit and held bilateral meetings. | |
| 88 | Belgium | Brussels | 27–28 May | Cameron attended the European Council summit. | |
| 89 | Belgium | Brussels | 4–5 June | Cameron attended the G7 summit. | |
| 90 | France | Normandy | 5–6 June | Cameron attended D-Day commemorations. | |
| 91 | Sweden | Harpsund | 9–10 June | Cameron attended a meeting with Prime Minister Fredrik Reinfeldt, Germany Chancellor Angela Merkel, and Dutch Prime Minister Mark Rutte. | |
| 92 | Belgium | Brussels, Ypres | 26–27 June | Cameron attended the European Council summit. | |
| 93 | Belgium | Brussels | 16–17 July | Cameron attended the European Council summit. | |
| 94 | France | | 4 August | Cameron attended First World War centenary Commemorations. | |
| 94 | Belgium | | 4 August | Cameron attended First World War centenary Commemorations. | |
| 95 | Belgium | Brussels | 30 August | Cameron attended the European Council summit. | |
| 96 | United States | New York City | 22–24 September | Cameron attended the 69th United Nations General Assembly. | |
| 97 | Afghanistan | Kabul | 3 October | Cameron became the first foreign leader to visit new President of Afghanistan Ashraf Ghani. | |
| 98 | Italy | Milan | 16–17 October | Cameron attended the Asia-Europe meeting. | |
| 99 | Belgium | Brussels | 23–24 October | Cameron attended the European Council summit. | |
| 100 | Finland | Helsinki | 6–7 November | Cameron attended the Northern Future Forum. | |
| 101 | Australia | Brisbane | 13–17 November | Cameron attended the G20 summit. | |
| 102 | Turkey | Ankara | 9–10 December | Cameron held bilateral meetings with Prime Minister Ahmet Davutoğlu and President Recep Tayyip Erdoğan. | |
| 102 | Poland | Oświęcim | 9–10 December | Cameron visited the Auschwitz concentration camp. | |
| 103 | Belgium | Brussels | 18 December | Cameron attended the European Council summit. | |

== 2015 ==
| # | Country | Location | Date | Details | Image |
|---|---|---|---|---|---|
| 104 | France | Paris | 11 January | Cameron met with President François Hollande and other leaders and to attend march. | |
| 105 | United States | Washington, D.C. | 15–16 January | Cameron undertook a Global economy security visit and attended bilateral meetings. | |
| 106 | Saudi Arabia | Riyadh | 24 January | Cameron paid condolences following the death of King Abdullah bin Abdulaziz. | |
| 107 | Belgium | Brussels | 12 February | Cameron attended the European Council summit. | |
| 108 | Belgium | Brussels | 19–20 March | Cameron attended the European Council summit. | |
| 109 | Belgium | Brussels | 23 April | Cameron attended the European Council summit. | |
| 110 | Latvia | Riga | 21 May | Cameron attended the Eastern partnership summit. | |
| 111 | Netherlands | The Hague | 28–29 May | Cameron held bilateral talks with Prime Minister Mark Rutte. | |
| 111 | France | Paris | 28–29 May | Cameron held bilateral talks with President François Hollande. | |
| 111 | Poland | Warsaw | 28–29 May | Cameron held bilateral talks with Polish Prime Minister Ewa Kopacz. | |
| 111 | Germany | Berlin | 28–29 May | Cameron held bilateral talks with German Chancellor Angela Merkel. | |
| 112 | Germany | Schloss Elmau | 7 June | Cameron attended the G7 summit. | |
| 113 | Belgium | Brussels | 10 June | Cameron attended the EU-CELAC meeting. | |
| 114 | Italy | Milan | 17 June | Cameron visited Expo 2015 and held bilateral meetings. | |
| 114 | Luxembourg | Luxembourg | 17 June | Cameron held a bilateral meeting with Prime Minister Xavier Bettel. | |
| 115 | Slovenia | Ljubljana | 18–19 June | Cameron held Bilateral talks with Prime Minister Miro Cerar. | |
| 115 | Slovakia | Bratislava | 18–19 June | Cameron held Bilateral talks with Prime Minister Bohuslav Sobotka and attended the GLOBSEC Conference. | |
| 116 | Germany | Berlin | 24–25 June | Cameron took part in the German State Visit. | |
| 117 | Belgium | Brussels | 25–26 June | Cameron attended the European Council summit. | |
| 118 | Indonesia | Jakarta | 26–31 June | Cameron took a Trade Mission and held bilateral talks. | |
| 118 | Singapore | | 26–31 June | Cameron took a Trade Mission and held bilateral talks. | |
| 118 | Vietnam | Hanoi, Ho Chi Minh City | 26–31 June | Cameron took a Trade Mission and held bilateral talks. | |
| 118 | Malaysia | Kuala Lumpur | 26–31 June | Cameron took a Trade Mission and held bilateral talks. | |
| 119 | Portugal | Lisbon | 3–4 September | Cameron held bilateral talks with Prime Minister Pedro Passos Coelho. | |
| 119 | Spain | Madrid | 3–4 September | Cameron held bilateral talks with Prime Minister Mariano Rajoy. | |
| 120 | Lebanon | Beirut | 14 September | Cameron held bilateral talks with Prime Minister Tammam Salam. | |
| 120 | Jordan | Amman | 14 September | Cameron held bilateral talks with King Abdullah II | |
| 121 | Belgium | Brussels | 23–24 September | Cameron attended the European Council summit. | |
| 122 | United States | New York City | 27 September – 1 October | Cameron attended the 70th United Nations General Assembly. | |
| 122 | Jamaica | Kingston | 27 September – 1 October | Cameron held bilateral talks with Prime Minister Portia Simpson-Miller. | |
| 122 | Grenada | St. George's | 27 September – 1 October | Cameron held bilateral talks with Prime Minister Mitchell. | |
| 123 | Belgium | Brussels | 15–16 October | Cameron attended the European Council summit. | |
| 124 | Iceland | Reykjavík | 22–29 October | Cameron attended the Northern Future Forum. | |
| 125 | Malta | Valletta | 11–12 November | Cameron attended a Migration Summit and held bilateral talks. | |
| 126 | Turkey | Antalya | 15–16 November | Cameron attended the G20 summit. | |
| 127 | France | Paris | 23 November | Cameron held bilateral talks with President François Hollande. | |
| 128 | Austria | Vienna | 26 November | Cameron held bilateral talks. | |
| 128 | Malta | Valletta | 26 November | Cameron attended the 2015 Commonwealth Heads of Government Meeting. | |
| 129 | Belgium | Brussels | 29–30 November | Cameron attended the EU-Turkey summit. | |
| 129 | France | Paris | 29–30 November | Cameron attended the 2015 United Nations Climate Change Conference. | |
| 130 | Bulgaria | Sofia | 3–4 December | Cameron held bilateral talks. | |
| 131 | Romania | Bucharest | 9–10 December | Cameron held bilateral talks. | |
| 131 | Poland | Warsaw | 9–10 December | Cameron held bilateral talks. | |
| 132 | Belgium | Brussels | 17 December | Cameron attended the European Council summit. | |

== 2016 ==
| # | Country | Location | Date | Details | Image |
|---|---|---|---|---|---|
| 133 | Germany | Bavaria | 6–7 January | Cameron held bilateral meetings. | |
| 133 | Hungary | Budapest | 6–7 January | Cameron held bilateral meetings. | |
| 134 | Switzerland | Davos | 20–22 January | Cameron attended the World Economic Forum | |
| 134 | Czech Republic | Prague | 20–22 January | Cameron held bilateral talks with Prime Minister Bohuslav Sobotka and President Miloš Zeman. | |
| 135 | Belgium | Brussels | 29 January | Cameron had a working lunch with President of the European Commission Jean-Claude Juncker and a bilateral meeting with President of the European Parliament Martin Schulz. | |
| 136 | Poland | Warsaw | 4–5 February | Cameron held bilateral talks. | |
| 136 | Denmark | Copenhagen | 4–5 February | Cameron held bilateral talks. | |
| 137 | Germany | Hamburg | 12 February | Cameron had a working dinner with Chancellor Angela Merkel | |
| 138 | France | Paris | 15–16 February | Cameron held a bilateral meeting with President François Hollande | |
| 138 | Belgium | Brussels | 15–16 February | Cameron attended the Conference of Presidents of the European Parliament. | |
| 139 | Belgium | Brussels | 18–19 February | Cameron attended the European Council summit. | |
| 140 | France | Amiens | 3 March | Cameron attended the UK-France Defence summit. | |
| 141 | Belgium | Brussels | 7 March | Cameron attended the EU-Turkey Summit. | |
| 142 | Belgium | Brussels | 17–18 March | Cameron attended the European Council summit. | |
| 143 | United States | Washington, D.C. | 31 March – 1 April | Cameron attended the Nuclear Security Summit and held bilateral meetings. | |
| 144 | Germany | Hanover | 25 April | Cameron attended the Quint Meeting with Chancellor Angela Merkel, French President François Hollande, Italian Prime Minister Matteo Renzi, and U.S. President Barack Obama. | |
| 145 | Japan | Ise-Shima | 25–27 May | Cameron attended the G7 summit. | |
| 146 | Belgium | Brussels | 28 June | Cameron attended the Conference of Presidents of the European Parliament. | |
| 147 | France | Thiepval | 1 July | Cameron attended the Somme Centenary Commemoration. | |
| 148 | Poland | Warsaw | 8–9 July | Cameron attended the NATO summit. | |

== Multilateral meetings ==
David Cameron participated in the following summits during his premiership:

| Group | Year | | | | | | |
| Group | 2010 | 2011 | 2012 | 2013 | 2014 | 2015 | 2016 |
|---|---|---|---|---|---|---|---|
| UNGA | 24 September,^{[a]} (United States) New York City | 22 September, (United States) New York City | 26 September, (United States) New York City | 27 September,^{[a]} (United States) New York City | 24 September, (United States) New York City | September, (United States) New York City | |
| G7 | 25–26 June, (Canada) Huntsville | 26–27 May, Deauville | 18–19 May, (United States) Camp David | 17–18 June, (United Kingdom) Enniskillen | 4–5 June, (Belgium) Brussels | 7–8 June, (Germany) Krün | 26–27 May, (Japan) Shima |
| G-20 | 26–27 June, (Canada) Toronto | 3–4 November, Cannes | 18–19 June, (Mexico) Los Cabos | 5–6 September, (Russia) Saint Petersburg | 15–16 November, (Australia) Brisbane | 15–16 November, (Turkey) Antalya | |
| G-20 | 11–12 November, (South Korea) Seoul | 3–4 November, Cannes | 18–19 June, (Mexico) Los Cabos | 5–6 September, (Russia) Saint Petersburg | 15–16 November, (Australia) Brisbane | 15–16 November, (Turkey) Antalya | |
| NATO | 19–20 November, (Portugal) Lisbon | none | 20–21 May, (United States) Chicago | none | 4–5 September, (United Kingdom) Newport | none | 8–9 July, (Poland) Warsaw |
| NSS | | | 26–27 March, (South Korea) Seoul | | 24–25 March, (Netherlands) The Hague | | 31 March – 1 April, (United States) Washington, D.C. |
| EP | | 30 September, (Poland) Warsaw | | 28–29 November, (Lithuania) Vilnius | | 21–22 May, (Latvia) Riga | |
| EU–CELAC | None | | | 26–27 January, (Chile) Santiago | None | 10 June, (Belgium) Brussels | None |
| EU Summit | 17 June, 28–29 October, 16–17 December, (Belgium) Brussels | 4 February, 24–25 March, 23–24 June, 23 October, 8–9 December, (Belgium) Brussels | 1–2 March, 28–29 June, 18–19 October, 13–14 December, (Belgium) Brussels | 7–8 February, 14–15 March, 22 May, 27–28 June, 19–20 December, (Belgium) Brussels | 20–21 March, 26–27 June, 23–24 October, 18 December, (Belgium) Brussels | 19–20 March, 25–26 June, 15 October, 17–18 December, (Belgium) Brussels | 18–19 February, 17–18 March, (Belgium) Brussels |
| CHOGM | none | 28–30 October, (Australia) Perth | none | 15–17 November, (Sri Lanka) Colombo | none | 27–29 November, (Malta) Valletta | none |
██ = Did not attend^aDeputy Prime Minister Nick Clegg attended in the Prime Minister's place.

== See also ==
- Foreign relations of the United Kingdom
- List of international trips made by prime ministers of the United Kingdom
- List of state visits made by Elizabeth II
- List of Commonwealth visits made by Elizabeth II
- List of international trips made by David Cameron as Foreign Secretary of the United Kingdom
