= List of international prime ministerial trips made by Rishi Sunak =

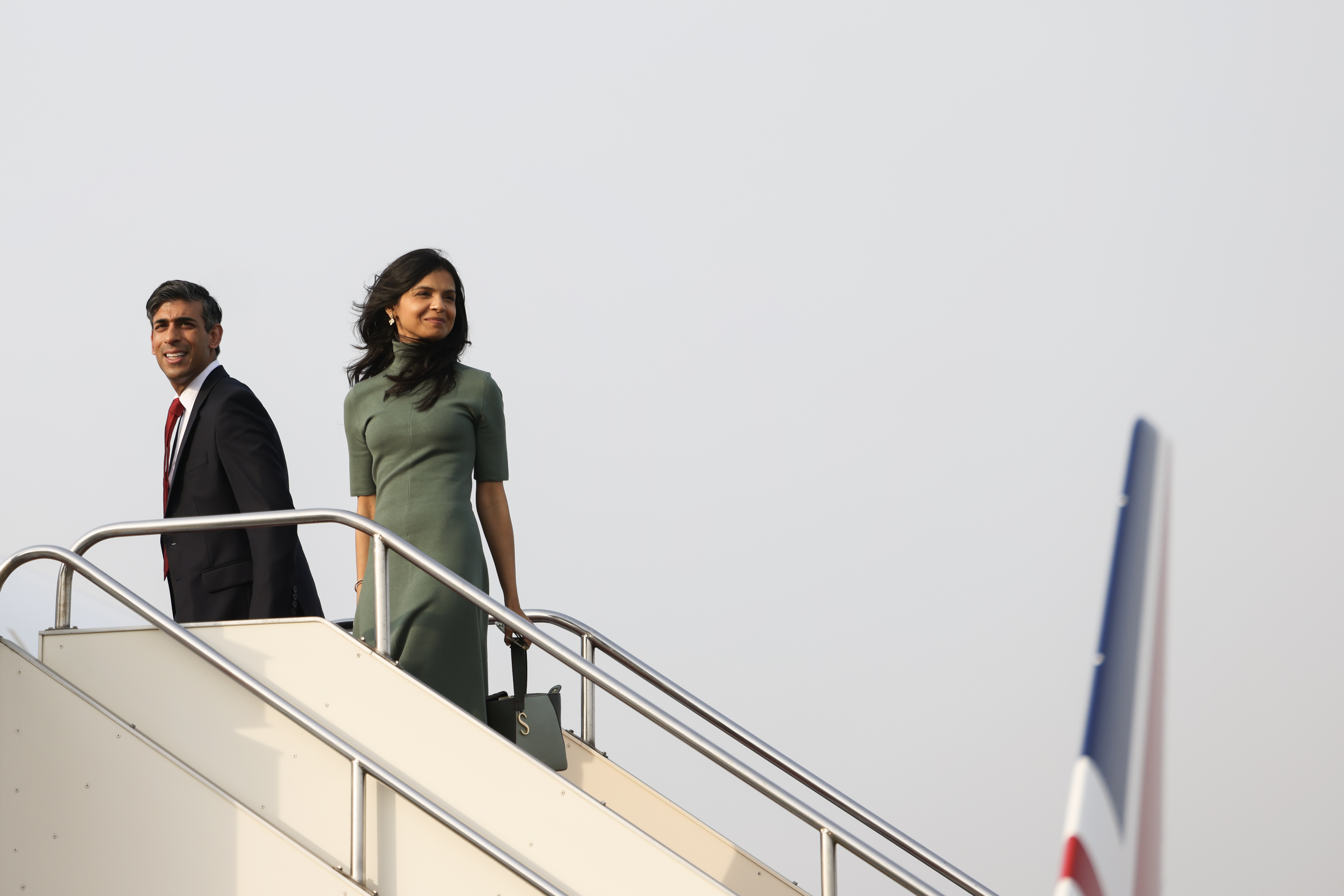
Prime Minister Rishi Sunak and his wife Akshata Murty, May 2023.

This is the list of international prime ministerial trips made by Rishi Sunak, who served as Prime Minister of the United Kingdom from 25 October 2022 until his resignation on 5 July 2024. Rishi Sunak made 24 international trips to 22 countries during his premiership.

== Summary ==
The number of visits per country where Sunak travelled are:

- One: Austria, Estonia, Iceland, India, Indonesia, Israel, Japan, Latvia, Lithuania, Moldova, Poland, Saudi Arabia, Spain, Sweden, Switzerland, United Arab Emirates.
- Two: Egypt, France, Germany, Italy, Ukraine, United States.

World map highlighting the 22 countries visited by Rishi Sunak during his premiership: United Kingdom One visit Two visits

== 2022 ==
| # | Country | Location | Date | Details | Image |
|---|---|---|---|---|---|
| 1 | Egypt | Sharm El Sheikh | 6–7 November | Sunak attended the high level segment of COP27. | |
| 2 | Indonesia | Bali | 14–16 November | Sunak attended the G20 summit. | |
| 3 | Ukraine | Kyiv | 19 November | Sunak met with President Volodymyr Zelenskyy, and pledged £50 million in aid. | |
| 4 | Latvia | Riga | 19 December | Sunak attended a Joint Expeditionary Force leaders summit. | |
| 4 | Estonia | Tallinn | 19 December | Sunak visited British troops at Tapa Army Base. | |

== 2023 ==
| # | Country | Location | Date | Details | Image |
|---|---|---|---|---|---|
| 5 | Germany | Munich | 18 February | Sunak attended the 59th Munich Security Conference. | |
| 6 | France | Paris | 10 March | Sunak travelled by Eurostar to Paris to meet with President Emmanuel Macron for a UK–France Summit. It was the first time a British Prime Minister had travelled to Paris for a summit by train. | |
| 7 | United States | San Diego | 13 March | Sunak met with President Joe Biden and Australian Prime Minister Anthony Albanese to make an announcement on the next stage of the AUKUS pact. | |
| 8 | Iceland | Reykjavík | 16 May | Sunak attended the fourth Council of Europe summit. | |
| 9 | Japan | Tokyo, Hiroshima | 17–21 May | Sunak announced a new defence partnership and host a reception with business leaders in Tokyo. Following this, he held a bilateral meeting with Prime Minister Fumio Kishida and attended the G7 summit in Hiroshima. | |
| 10 | Moldova | Chișinău, Bulboaca | 1 June | Sunak attended the second summit of the European Political Community. He became the first UK prime minister to visit Moldova. | |
| 11 | United States | Arlington, Washington, D.C. | 7–8 June | The trip was primarily focused on business. On the first day of the trip, Sunak laid a wreath at Arlington National Cemetery. He addressed a major gathering of US business executives. Sunak met with Kevin McCarthy, the speaker of the House of Representatives, as well as Chuck Schumer and Mitch McConnell, the Democratic and Republican leaders of the Senate. Additionally, he and US President Joe Biden gave a joint press conference. He also watched the Washington Nationals play the Arizona Diamondbacks in a baseball game. | |
| 12 | Lithuania | Vilnius | 11–12 July | Sunak attended the NATO summit. | |
| 13 | India | New Delhi | 8–10 September | Sunak attended the G20 summit. Sunak became both the first British Prime Minister of Indian descent and first Hindu British Prime Minister to visit India. | |
| 14 | Spain | Granada | 5 October | Sunak attended the third summit of the European Political Community. | |
| 15 | Sweden | Visby | 12–13 October | Sunak attended a Joint Expeditionary Force summit. Sweden and the UK signed a strategic partnership, while Sunak also pledged to deploy more than 20,000 British troops across northern Europe in 2024. Sunak stayed on destroyer HMS Diamond, the first time a UK Prime Minister had stayed overnight on a Royal Navy warship since 1968. | |
| 16 | Israel | Jerusalem | 19 October | Sunak met with Prime Minister Benjamin Netanyahu, following the outbreak of the Gaza war. | |
| 16 | Saudi Arabia | Riyadh | 19–20 October | Sunak met with Saudi Crown Prince Mohammed bin Salman to discuss regional security. Sunak also met the Amir of Qatar, Sheikh Tamim bin Hamad Al Thani, the following morning. Sunak thanked Qatar for its involvement in securing the release of hostages taken by Hamas, including British nationals. | |
| 16 | Egypt | Cairo | 20 October | Sunak visited Egypt as part of a two-day visit to Middle Eastern capitals. He met with the President of Egypt Abdel Fattah el-Sisi and the President of the Palestinian National Authority Mahmoud Abbas. | |
| 17 | United Arab Emirates | Dubai | 1 December | Sunak attended COP28, where he committed the UK to invest £1.6 billion on climate projects. During the 11 hour trip he secured several deals, such as with energy firms RWE and Masdar to invest £11 billion into the Dogger Bank wind farm. | |
| 18 | Italy | Rome | 16 December | Sunak attended Prime Minister Giorgia Meloni's Brothers of Italy festival. The two leaders agreed to jointly finance migrant repatriations in Africa. | |

== 2024 ==
| # | Country | Location | Date | Details | Image |
|---|---|---|---|---|---|
| 19 | Ukraine | Kyiv | 12 January | Sunak met with President Volodymyr Zelenskyy to sign a security cooperation agreement with Ukraine. Sunak committed the UK to increase military funding to Ukraine to £2.5bn, claiming that this agreement will be the first step in developing a “100-year partnership” between the two nations. | |
| 20 | Poland | Warsaw | 23 April | Sunak met with Prime Minister Donald Tusk and NATO Secretary General Jens Stoltenberg. He pledged to provide an additional £500m to Ukraine on top of the £2.5bn allocated for this financial year, the largest aid package for Ukraine from the United Kingdom. During the meeting with Stoltenberg, Sunak set out the UK's plan to increase defence spending to 2.5% and to ensure that the United Kingdom remained the "foremost military power in Europe". Sunak invited Stoltenberg to the upcoming European Political Community summit, hosted by the UK. | |
| 20 | Germany | Berlin | 23–24 April | Sunak met with Chancellor Olaf Scholz to discuss increasing defence and security cooperation. The two leaders announced that German businesses will invest £8 billion into the United Kingdom. | |
| 21 | Austria | Vienna | 20–21 May | Sunak met with Chancellor Karl Nehammer to discuss illegal migration. Nehammer praised the United Kingdom as a 'pioneer' in outsourcing migrants to places outside of Europe, referring to Sunak's Rwanda asylum plan. | |
| 22 | France | Ver-sur-Mer | 6 June | Sunak made a speech in Normandy to commemorate the 80th Anniversary of D-Day. Sunak left the event early in order to campaign for the upcoming general election on 4 July, skipping the opportunity to meet with other world leaders, including President Biden, President Macron, and President Zelenskyy, at a commemorations ceremony. The following day, Sunak issued an apology for failing to attend the Omaha Beach ceremony. | |
| 23 | Italy | Fasano | 13–14 June | Sunak attended the G7 summit, where he set out the UK's £240m aid package to Ukraine. Sunak failed to schedule any official one-on-ones with other G7 leaders, however attended an unplanned meeting with Japanese Prime Minister Fumio Kishida at the end of the summit. | |
| 24 | Switzerland | Bürgenstock Resort | 15 June | Sunak attended the Summit on Peace in Ukraine. In a speech, he criticised countries supplying arms and components for Putin’s war effort, condemning them to "placing themselves on the side of the aggressor and on the wrong side of history". | |

== Multilateral meetings ==
Sunak attended the following summits during his prime ministership:

| Group | Year | | |
| Group | 2022 | 2023 | 2024 |
|---|---|---|---|
| UNGA | | 20–23 September,^{[a]} (United States) New York City | |
| G7 | | 19–21 May, (Japan) Hiroshima | 13–14 June, (Italy) Fasano |
| G20 | 15–16 November, (Indonesia) Bali | 8–10 September, (India) New Delhi | |
| NATO | | 11–12 July, (Lithuania) Vilnius | |
| CHOGM | | 5–6 May, (United Kingdom) London | |
| EPC | | 1 June, (Moldova) Bulboaca | |
| EPC | | 5 October, (Spain) Granada | |
| COP | 6–7 November (Egypt) Sharm el-Sheikh | 1 December (United Arab Emirates) Dubai | |
| JEF | 19 December, (Latvia) Riga | 12–13 October, (Sweden) Visby | |
██ = Did not attend.^aDeputy Prime Minister Oliver Dowden attended in the Prime Minister's place.

== See also ==
- Foreign relations of the United Kingdom
- List of international trips made by James Cleverly as Foreign Secretary
- List of international trips made by David Cameron as Foreign Secretary
- List of international trips made by prime ministers of the United Kingdom
- List of official overseas trips made by Charles III
