= Northern Future Forum =

International forum

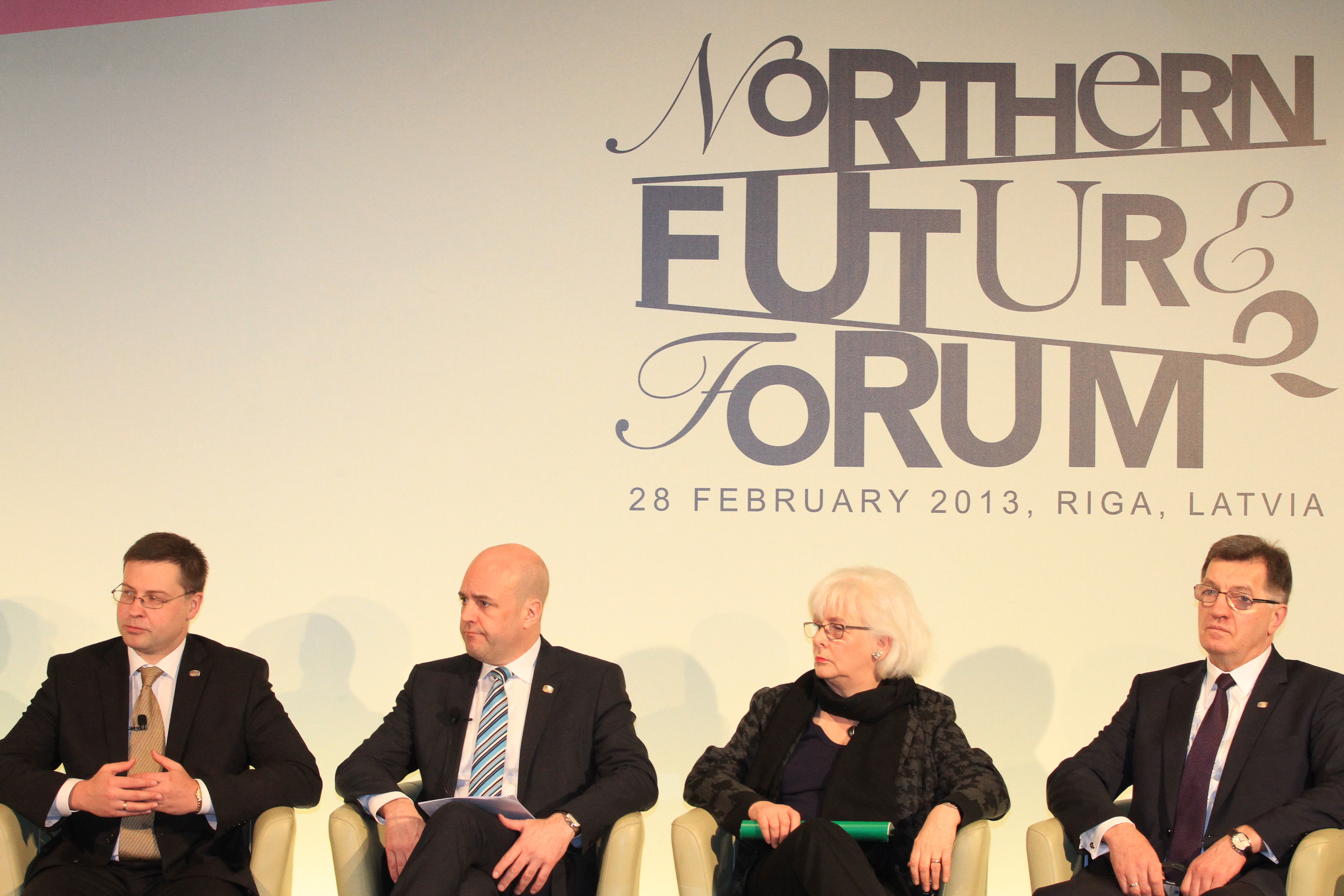
Opening session of the Riga meeting 2013

Northern Future Forum is an annual, informal meeting of prime ministers, policy innovators, entrepreneurs and business leaders from the 9 nations of Denmark, Estonia, Finland, Iceland, Latvia, Lithuania, Norway, Sweden and the United Kingdom. Initially referred to as the UK Nordic Baltic Summit, the name Northern Future Forum was introduced at the second meeting in Stockholm, 2012. The group had a period of abeyance since the Stavanger meeting in 2016 was postponed following the outcome of the 2016 United Kingdom European Union membership referendum, and David Cameron subsequently stepping down as UK prime minister, to be succeeded by Theresa May. The summit was reconvened in October 2018 in Oslo.

Former Swedish prime minister Fredrik Reinfeldt first suggested that the UK and Nordic-Baltic Eight nations have a summit during his November 2010 visit to the UK, following the UK general election in May and David Cameron becoming prime minister of the UK coalition government.

== Summits ==
The Northern Future Forum was established to be a more relaxed meeting than usual international summits, with more of a collegiate atmosphere where leaders are encouraged to learn and interact with experts in the topics under discussion, rather than delivering set-piece speeches or engaging in behind-the-scenes trading. Described in a press release from Erna Solberg announcing the 2016 meeting in Norway as ‘[The] NFF is a little unusual, but very exciting meeting place for us politicians. In this concept, we get a different insights into innovative trends, presented by today's experts and entrepreneurs, who in different ways are building what is our common future’

=== London 2011 ===
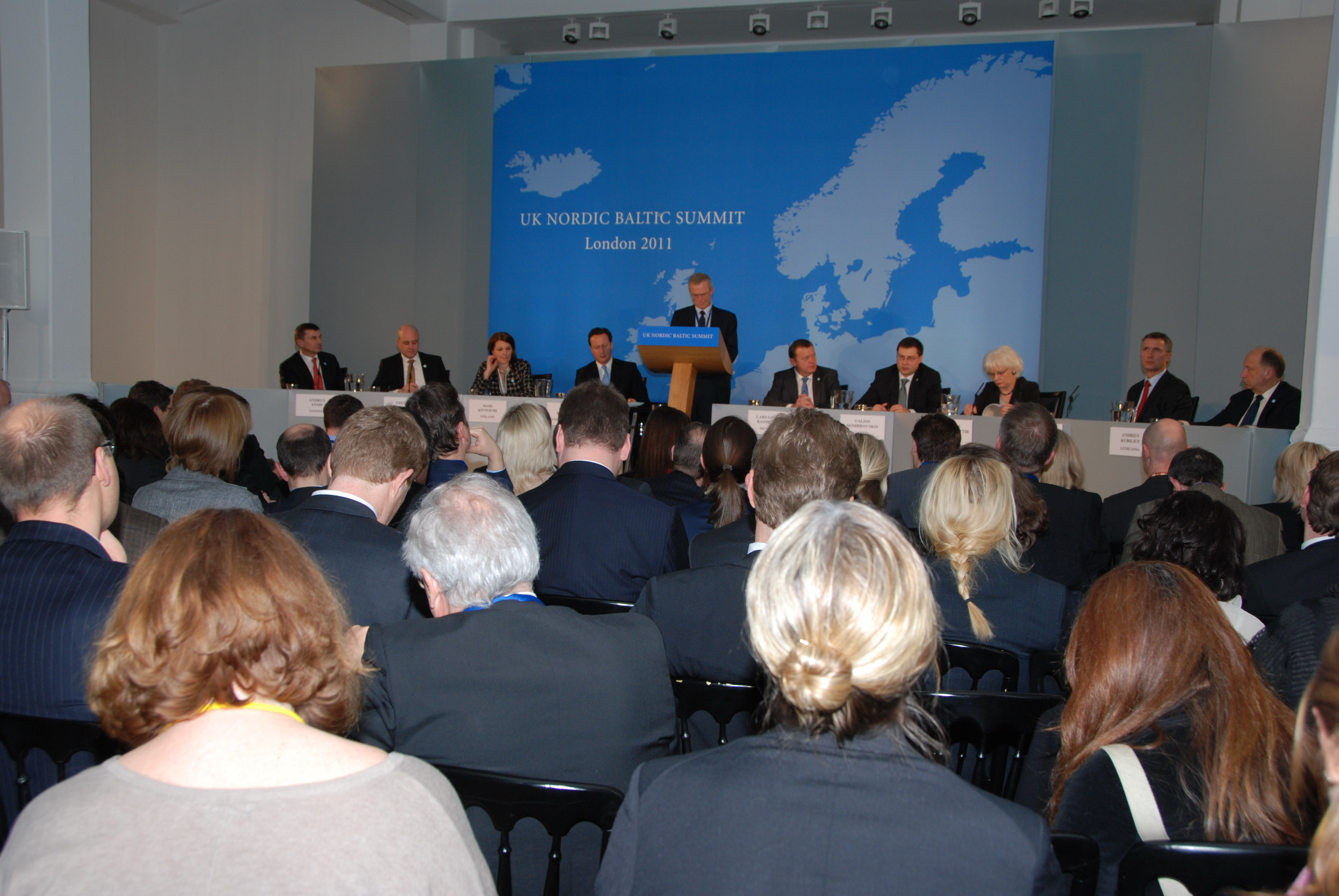
UK Nordic Baltic Summit

On the 19–20 January London hosted the inaugural UK-Nordic-Baltic meeting at Whitechapel Gallery in the East End of London. The first summit hosted 120 participants and touched on themes of improving business ties in the region, with a focus on low carbon and high-tech industries. Other topics included how best to foster equality, wellbeing and competitiveness during the Great Recession.

- Technology and Innovation
- Jobs, Family and Gender Equality
- Green Economy and Sustainable Business

The British Prime Minister, David Cameron ended the first summit calling for a new alliance of Northern European nations.

=== Stockholm 2012 ===
The second summit on the 8–9 February, was hosted in Stockholm. The second meeting saw the name changed to the "Northern Future Forum". The event was hosted in Fotografiska, The Swedish Museum of Photography, in the Södermalm district of the city.

Conference topics intended to focus on long-term sustainable growth were:

- How do we get more women into top positions and more women entrepreneurs?
- How do we get senior citizens to stay longer in the labour force?

=== Riga 2013 ===
The third summit was held on February 27–28, 2013 in Riga, Latvia. The opening and closing plenary were held in the Latvian Museum of Decorative Arts and Design with discussions and a media centre at Hotel Konventa sēta.

At the Stockholm 2012 meeting the Latvian prime minister Valdis Dombrovskis had proposed that Riga could host the next forum meeting, which was supported by the other members.

Two main issues chosen for the Forum:

- Can the green economy be competitive?
- Addressing the digital divide in society

The Finnish Prime Minister Jyrki Katainen, was unable to attend due to domestic political reasons, and was represented by Olli-Pekka Heinonen, state secretary to the PM’s bureau, and state secretary to the Finnish Economy and Employment Ministry Marja Rislakki. The British PM David Cameron returned to his country shortly after the opening plenary meetings, replaced by Planning Minister Nick Boles. David Cameron met with Latvian PM Valdis Dombrovskis the evening before the forum opening in order to discuss Latvia and the UK’s bilateral relations, including economic cooperation and problems within the EU.

=== Helsinki 2014 ===
At the closing plenary in Riga 2013, Marja Rislakki, State Secretary of the Ministry of Employment and Economy of Finland made a proposal to hold the Northern Future Forum 2014 in Helsinki, Finland. The NFF convened in Helsinki during 6–7 November 2014 at the Startup Sauna business accelerator of Aalto University's Otaniemi campus. The discussion themes of the 2014 meeting were:

- Competitiveness of education systems
- Promotion of innovative business activity.

=== Reykjavik 2015 ===
At the Helsinki meeting the Prime Minister of Iceland Sigmundur Davíð Gunnlaugsson invited delegates to Reykjavik for the next Northern Future Forum. The meeting was held on 28–29 October at the University of Iceland, being held in continuation of the 67 session of the Nordic Council in Reykjavik. Themes for this year's meeting were:

- The importance of creative industries
- Innovation as a catalyst for change in the way public service is run.

Attending the forum British Prime Minister David Cameron became the first British Premier to officially visit Iceland since it became a republic in 1944, the last being Winston Churchill in August 1941, over 70 years previously.

=== Oslo 2018 ===
In 2018, the Northern Future Forum was held on the 29–30 October at the Oslo Cancer Cluster, replacing the postponed 2016 meeting.

The 2016 Northern Future Forum was due to be held in Stavanger on 26–27 October 2016, though was initially stated to be postponed to an unknown future date, following David Cameron's resignation as British Prime Minister after the 2016 United Kingdom European Union membership referendum and Theresa May's appointment as UK Prime Minister. Themes for the forum were to include:

- How innovation and new technology can contribute to economic development.
- How a sharing economy can affect the labour market.

== Commentary ==
Media commentary as to wider implications of the Northern Future Forum have been varied, with the Swedish press being quite skeptical during the second meeting in Stockholm. The Local (Sweden) stated that the ‘meeting might have a longer-term strategic purpose, at least for British Prime Minister David Cameron: to forge a long-term alliance between the Northern European countries,’ and writing that there appeared to be a "risk that David Cameron wants the northern partnership to challenge Brussels."

The pro-EU liberal Dagens Nyheter suggested: ‘Behind the scenes, this “Northern Alliance” will also debate ways to frustrate a “French model” for the European economy.’ A Dagens Nyheter Editorial described the second assembly as a "meeting with risks", seeing it as being potentially divisive within the EU.

The Baltic Times saw the forum as a mirror to the Mediterranean Union proposed by Nicolas Sarkozy with Nouvelle-Europe comparing it to other groupings of EU members such as the Visegrád Group.

The Lithuania Tribune noted that the forum is unique as a pan-European meeting in that there are no negotiations, and no conditional agreements reached during the event. Stating that given the contemporary European sovereign-debt crisis the discussion topics at the Stockholm meeting rendered the group a rather peripheral event. However, the article also suggested that the informal nature of the forum raised an antidote to increasing mistrust between European nations in the wake of the eurozone crisis.

The initial founding of the group in 2011 met with some trepidation among the Russian media, fearing the group could amount to an ‘Arctic branch of NATO’, which may act to ease the accession of neutral Finland and Sweden into the alliance.

== See also ==
- Brexit
- Cooperation between China and Central and Eastern European Countries
- Craiova Group
- Digital Nations
- Nordic-Baltic Eight
- Northern Europe, UN region of Europe which covers a broadly similar geographic area.
- Porvoo Communion
- Three Seas Initiative
- Joint Expeditionary Force
- Visegrád Group
