= Latvian Museum of Decorative Arts and Design =

Museum in Riga, Latvia

- Dekoratīvās mākslas un dizaina muzejs
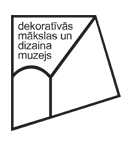

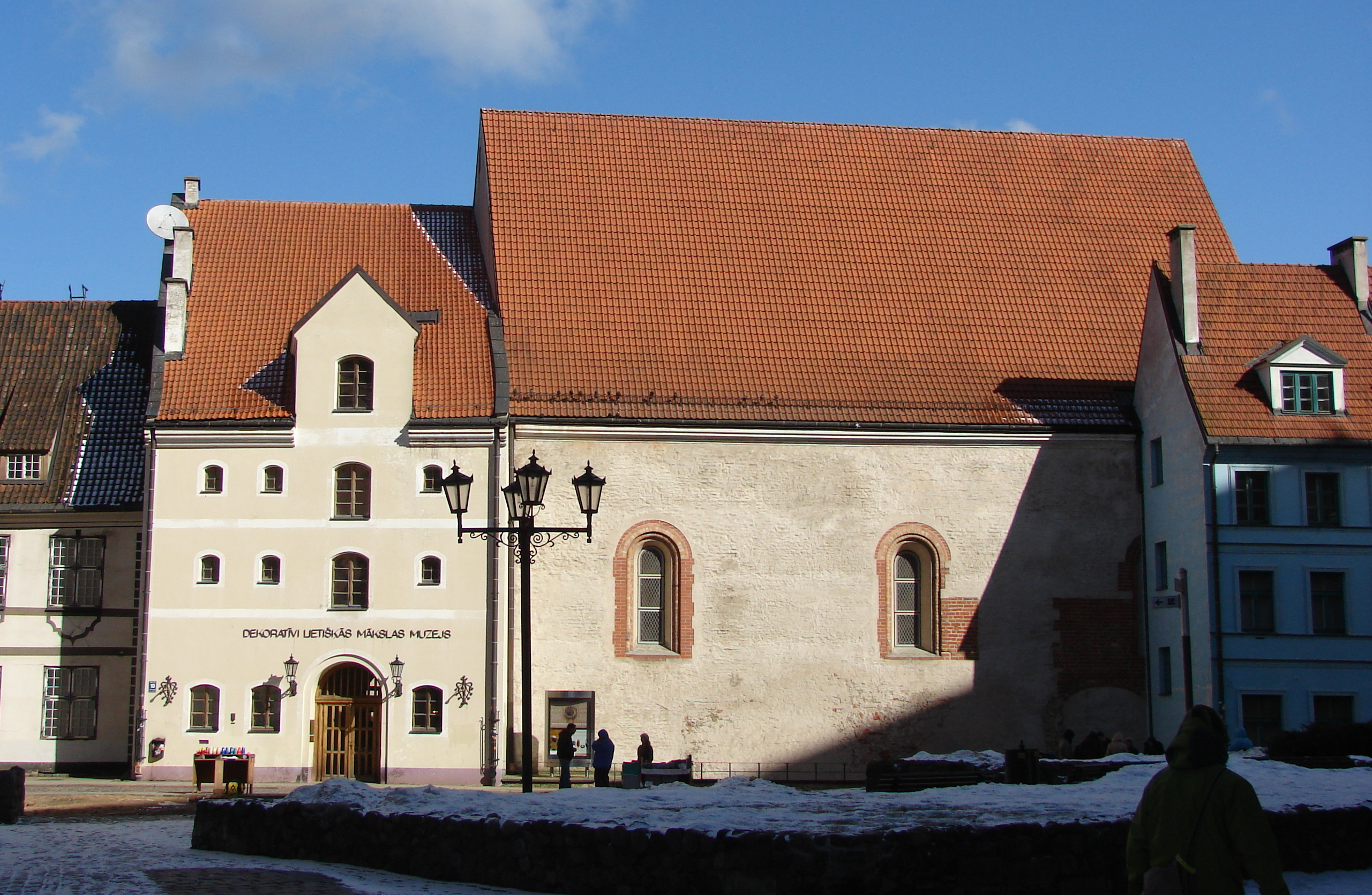
- St. George's Church, Riga
- Interactive fullscreen map
- Established: 1989
- Location: Vecrīga, Riga, Latvia
- Coordinates: 56°56′53″N 24°06′34″E
- Type: Art museum
- Owner: Latvian National Museum of Art
- Website: https://lnmm.gov.lv/en/museum-of-decorative-arts-and-design

The Latvian Museum of Decorative Arts and Design is an arts museum in Riga, Latvia. The museum was established on 1 January 1989 and opened to the public on 6 July 1989. It is located in the former church St. George's Church, Riga, the oldest surviving stone building in Riga.

The opening and closing plenary of the Northern Future Forum gathering of UK, Nordic, Baltic prime ministers was held here in 2013.
