= St. George's Church, Riga =

Coordinates: 56.948087°N 24.10954°E

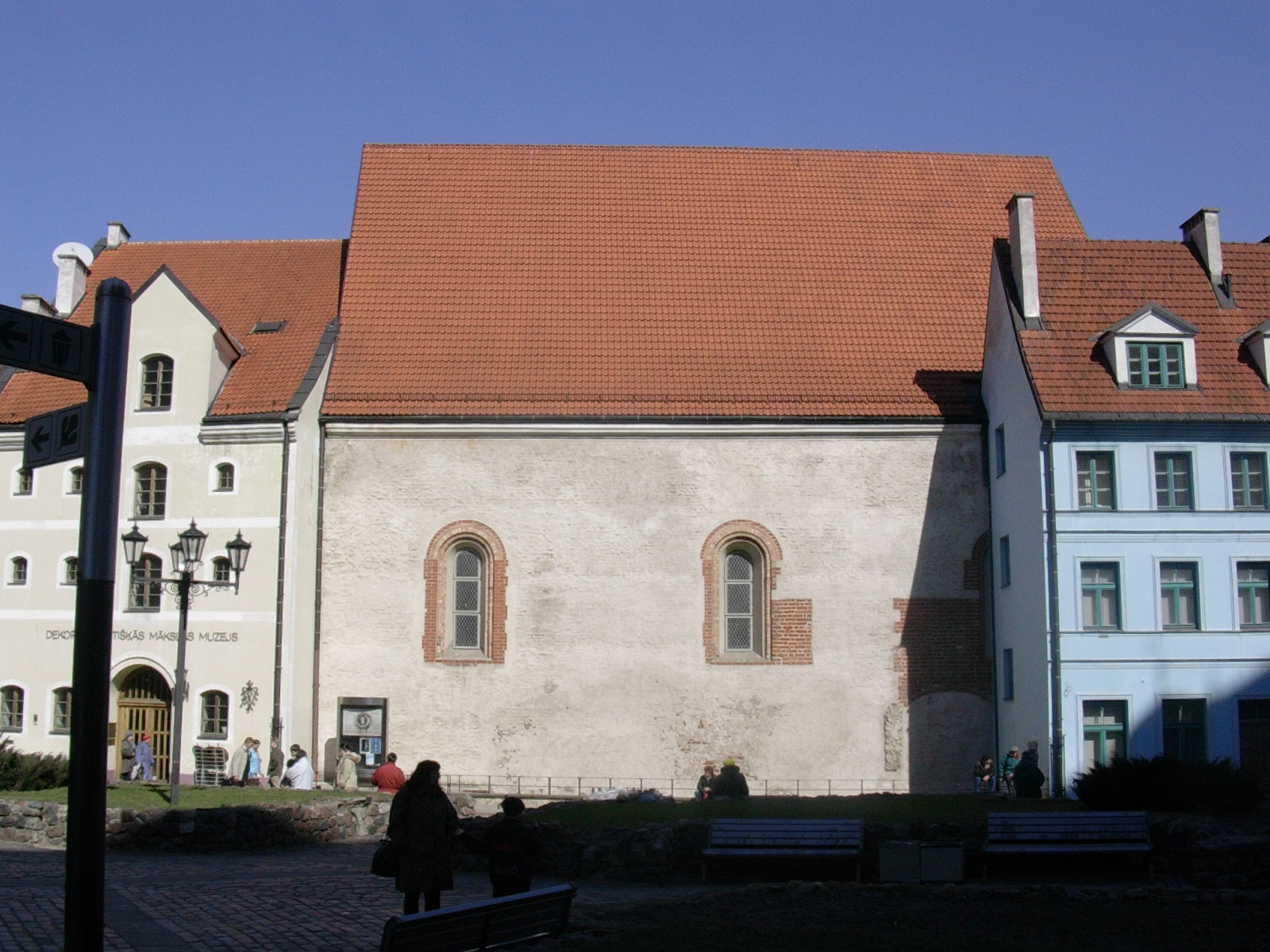

St. George's Church (Latvian: Svētā Jura baznīca) used to be a Catholic church in Riga, the capital of Latvia. The church building now houses the Latvian Museum of Decorative Arts and Design and is situated at the address 10/12 Skārņu Street. It is the oldest stone building in Riga as well as the first church constructed in Riga.

== History ==
St. George's Church was constructed in the early-13th century by the Order of Livonian Brothers of the Sword as the chapel of their castle in Riga. It survived a fire in 1215 and was expanded with a sacristy installed. In 1226, following an agreement with Albert, Bishop of Riga, the papal legate William of Modena and three other bishops consecrated it as the Order's military church and gave it to them. In 1297, during a riot between the Order and the local Rigan townspeople, the church was damaged but was not demolished despite the rest of the castle being destroyed. The bishop of Lund subsequently ordered that a wall be constructed to separate the church from the town. The Order expanded it further in the 14th century when the nave was made wider. In 1488, Riga City Council handed the church to the Franciscans who renamed it St. Catherine's Church, despite the objections of the Archbishop of Riga Michael Hildebrand.

By the time of the Reformation, in 1554 the church had ceased to be used for Christian worship and started to be used as a warehouse and granary. It underwent minor reconstruction in 1689 to expand the warehousing space. Until 1887, its status as a former church had been forgotten until the history was rediscovered by the historian Karl Löwis who recognised the architecture as that of a former church. It continued as a warehouse until 1989 when it was transformed into a museum for decorative arts.
