= Kuleba =

Kuleba (Ukrainian: Кулеба) is a Ukrainian surname. Notable people with the surname include:

- Dmytro Kuleba (born 1981), Ukrainian politician and diplomat, Minister of Foreign Affairs (2020–2024)
- Oleksiy Kuleba (born 1983), Ukrainian politician, Minister of Community and Territories Development (since 2024)
- Mykola Kuleba (born 1972), Ukrainian children's rights activist
