= President Herzog =

President Herzog may refer to:

- Chaim Herzog (1918–1997), President of Israel from 1983 to 1993
- Isaac Herzog (born 1960), President of Israel since 2021 and the son of Chaim

== See also ==
- Herzog (disambiguation)
