= List of international trips made by David Cameron as Foreign Secretary =

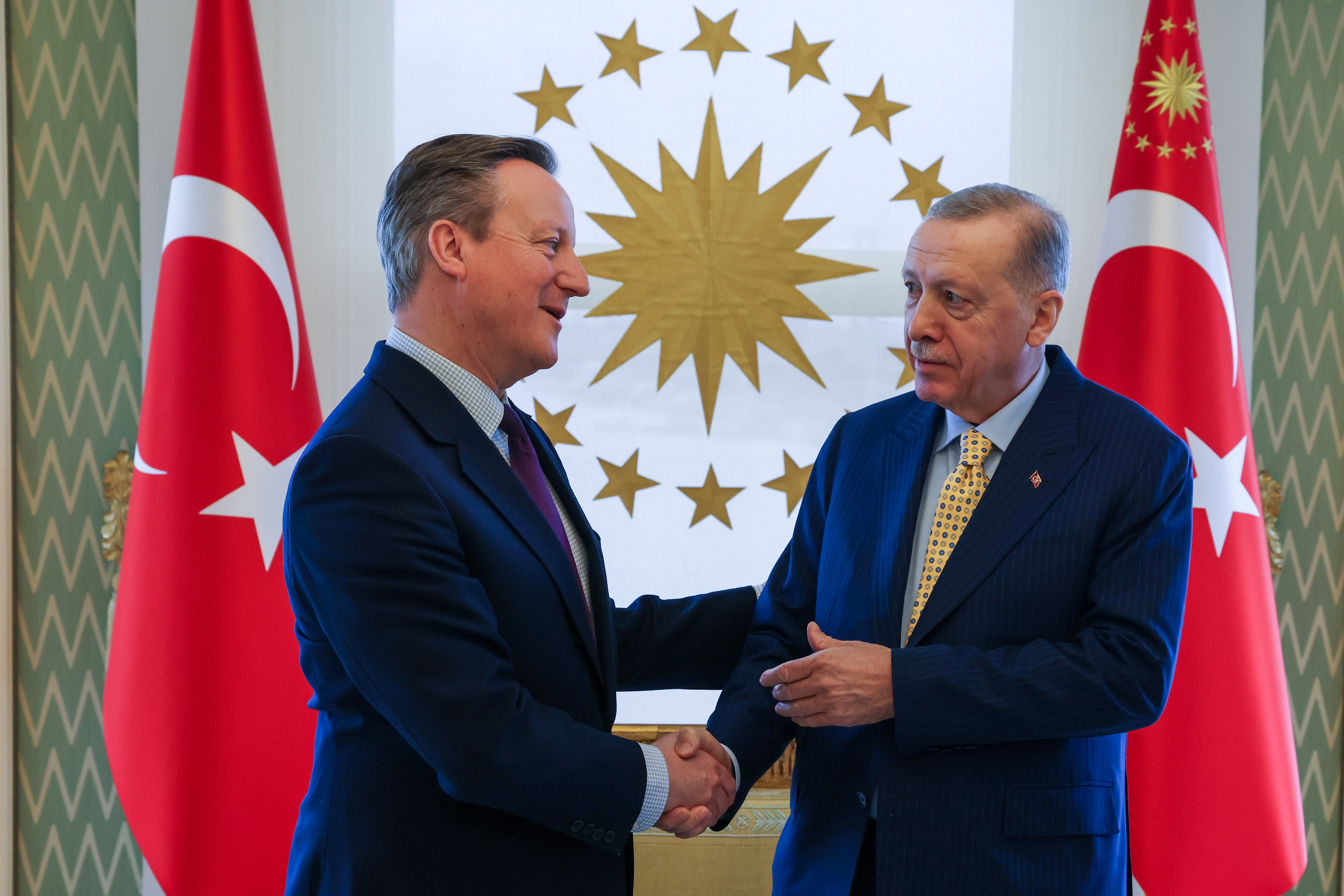
Foreign Secretary David Cameron with Turkish President Recep Tayyip Erdoğan in Istanbul, Turkey, January 2024

This is a list of international visits undertaken by David Cameron (in office from November 2023 to July 2024) while serving as the Foreign Secretary. The list includes both private travel and official visits. The list includes only foreign travel which the Foreign Secretary made during his tenure in the position. During his tenure he has made a number of original visits, including being the first Minister to visit the Falkland Islands since 2016 and the first to ever visit Paraguay, Kyrgyzstan, Turkmenistan and Tajikistan.

== Summary ==
Cameron visited 34 countries and territories during his tenure as Foreign Secretary. The number of visits per country or territory where Cameron traveled are:

- One visit to Albania, Australia, Brazil, Bulgaria, Egypt, Falkland Islands, Jordan, Kazakhstan, Kosovo, Kuwait, Kyrgyzstan, Moldova, Mongolia, North Macedonia, Oman, Paraguay, Poland, Qatar, Saudi Arabia, Switzerland, Tajikistan, Thailand, Turkey, Turkmenistan, the UAE and Uzbekistan.
- Two visits to Germany, Italy, the Palestinian National Authority and Ukraine.
- Three visits to France, Israel and the US
- Four visits to Belgium.

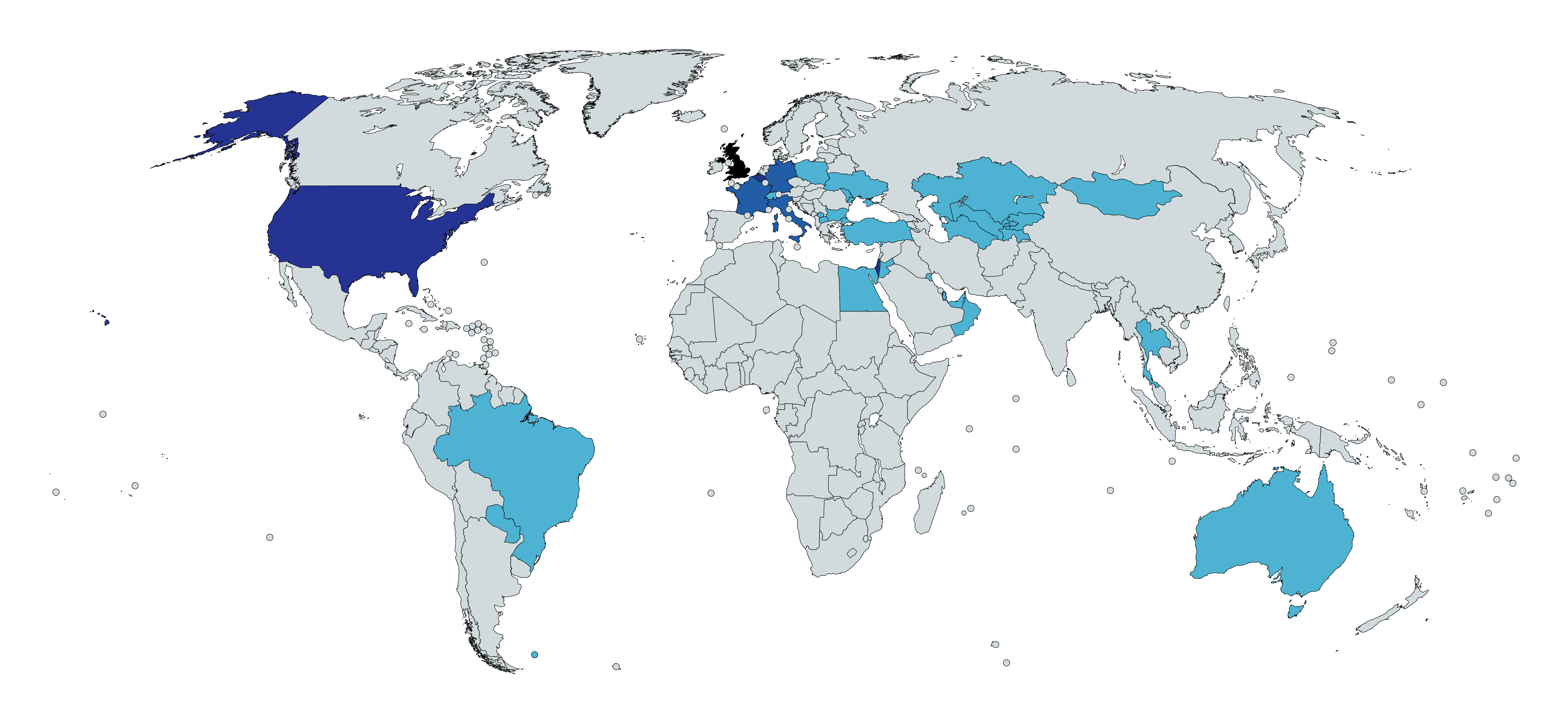
Map of international trips made by David Cameron as Foreign Secretary – March 2024: United Kingdom 3 visits 2 visits 1 visit

== List of international trips ==
	Country	Locations	Dates	Details
1	Ukraine	Kyiv	16 November 2023	Met with President of Ukraine Volodymyr Zelenskyy, Prime Minister of Ukraine Denys Shmyhal and Foreign Minister Dmytro Kuleba.
1	Moldova	Chișinău	16 November 2023	Met with President Maia Sandu.
2	Israel	Jerusalem, Be'eri	23 November 2023	Met with Prime Minister Benjamin Netanyahu and toured southern Israel.
3	Belgium	Brussels	28-29 November 2023	Met with Foreign Minister Dmytro Kuleba and NATO Foreign Ministers.
3	North Macedonia	Skopje	30 November 2023	Attended the 30th meeting of the OSCE Ministerial Council.
3	UAE	Dubai	1 December 2023	Met with President Narendra Modi during COP28.
4	USA	Washington, D.C.	6-7 December 2023	Met with Secretary of State Antony Blinken to reaffirm both the strength of the UK’s relationship with its closest strategic ally and support for Ukraine.
5	Kuwait	Kuwait City	18 December 2023	Traveled to the funeral of Nawaf Al-Ahmad Al-Jaber Al-Sabah Emir of Kuwait.
6	France	Paris	19 December 2023	Met with President Emmanuel Macron and Foreign Minister Catherine Colonna to discuss the humanitarian crisis in Gaza as well as maintaining support for Ukraine over the winter period.
6	Italy	Rome	19 December 2023	Met with Prime Minister Giorgia Meloni and Foreign Minister Antonio Tajani to address Italian ambassadors gathered at the Italian foreign ministry for their annual Heads of Mission conference.
7	Egypt	Al-Arish	20-21 December 2023	Met with representatives from the Egyptian Red Crescent Society to discuss UK aid to Gaza.
7	Jordan	Amman	21 December 2023	Met with Foreign Minister Ayman Safadi.
8	Kosovo	Pristina	4 January 2024	Met with the President of Kosovo Vjosa Osmani, Prime Minister Albin Kurti, Foreign Minister Donika Gërvalla-Schwarz.
9	Switzerland	Davos	15-17 January 2024	Attended the World Economic Forum annual meeting. Met with President Javier Milei of Argentina, Foreign Minister Hossein Amir-Abdollahian of Iran, Foreign Minister Dmytro Kuleba of Ukraine and Secretary of State Antony Blinken.
10	Israel	Jerusalem	24 January 2024	Met with Prime Minister Benjamin Netanyahu and Foreign Minister Israel Katz.
10	Palestinian National Authority	Ramallah	24 January 2024	Met with President Mahmoud Abbas.
10	Qatar	Doha	25 January 2024	Met with Qatari Assistant Foreign Minister Lolwah Al Khater to discuss Gaza aid deliveries.
10	Turkey	Ankara	25 January 2024	Met with Turkish Officials.
11	Oman	Muscat	30 January 2024	Met with Foreign Minister Badr bin Hamad Al Busaidi.
12	Bulgaria	Sofia	13 February 2024	Met with Prime Minister Nikolay Denkov and Foreign Minister Mariya Gabriel.
12	Poland	Warsaw	14 February 2024	Met with Polish Officials to discuss support for Ukraine and tacjkling illegal migration.
12	Germany	Munich	15-16 February 2024	Attended the annual Munich Security Conference. Met with Chinese Foreign Minister Wang Yi.
13	Falkland Islands	Port Stanley, Mount Pleasant	19 February 2024	First visit to the islands by a sitting UK cabinet Minister since 2016.
13	Paraguay	Asunción	20 February 2024	First visit to Paraguay by a UK Foreign Secretary. Met with President Santiago Peña and Foreign Minister Rubén Ramírez Lezcano.
13	Brazil	Rio De Janeiro	21-22 February 2024	Attended a meeting of G20 Foreign Ministers. Met with the Brazilian Foreign Minister Mauro Vieira.
13	USA	New York City	23 February 2024	Attended a meeting of United Nations General Assembly to mark the second anniversary of the Russian invasion of Ukraine.
14	France	Paris	27 February 2024	Attended President Macron's conference of European leaders to discuss further assistance for Ukraine.
15	Germany	Berlin	7-8 March 2024	Met with German Foreign Minister Annalena Baerbock at the second UK-Germany annual Strategic Dialogue.
16	Thailand	Bangkok	20 March 2024	Met with Thai Prime Minister Srettha Thavisin and Foreign Minister Parnpree Bahiddha-nukara.
16	Australia	Canberra, Adelaide	21-22 March 2024	Traveled to Australia for the 18th UK-Australia AUKIMIN with Defence Secretary Grant Shapps. Met with Foreign Minister Penny Wong and signed a memorandum of understanding to tackle gender-based violence in the Pacific, as well as meeting business leaders and traveling to Osborne Naval Shipyard.
17	Belgium	Brussels	3-4 April 2024	Attended the two day NATO Foreign Ministers meeting, which included meeting with Swedish Foreign Minister Tobias Billström, on NATO's 75th anniversary.
18	USA	Mar-a-Lago, Washington, D.C.	9-10 April 2024	Visited Mar-a-Lago to meet with former President and Republican presidential candidate Donald Trump, then travelled to Washington D.C to speak to the US partners regarding Ukraine and other world issues. Met with Antony Blinken, Mitch McConnell and Chuck Schumer.
19	Belgium	Brussels	12 April 2024	Traveled to Brussels to progress the post Brexit treaty negotiations on Gibraltar. He met with European Commission Executive Vice-President Maroš Šefčovič, Spanish Foreign Minister José Manuel Albares and the Chief Minister of Gibraltar Fabian Picardo.
20	Israel	Jerusalem	17 April 2024	Traveled to Jerusalem in the wake of the 2024 Iranian strikes in Israel to press of regional deescalation. He met with President Isaac Herzog, Prime Minister Benjamin Netanyahu and Foreign Minister Israel Katz.
20	Palestinian National Authority	Ramallah	17 April 2024	Cameron then travelled to Ramallah to meet with newly appointed Prime Minister of the Palestinian Palestinian National Authority Mohammad Mustafa.
20	Italy	Capri	17-19 April 2024	Traveled to Capri for the G7 Foreign Ministers meeting in the wake of the 2024 Iranian strikes in Israel.
21	Tajikistan	Dushanbe	22 April 2024	The first UK Foreign Secretary to travel to Tajikistan. Met with President Emomali Rahmon.
21	Kyrgyzstan	Bishkek	22-23 April 2024	The first UK Foreign Secretary to travel to Kyrgyzstan. Met with President Sadyr Zhaparov.
21	Uzbekistan	Tashkent	23 April 2024	Met with Foreign Minister Baxtiyor Saidov.
21	Turkmenistan	Ashgabat	24 April 2024	The first UK Foreign Secretary to travel to Turkmenistan. Met with President Serdar Berdimuhamedov.
21	Kazakhstan	Astana	24-25 April 2024	David Cameron's first visit to the country since his 2013 visit as Prime Minister. Met with Foreign Minister Murat Nurtleu. The two signed a Strategic Partnership and Cooperation Agreement.
21	Mongolia	Ulaanbaatar	26 April 2024	Met with President Ukhnaagiin Khurelsukh and Prime Minister Luvsannamsrain Oyun-Erdene. Signed a joint co-operation road map.
22	Saudi Arabia	Riyadh	29 April 2024	Attended the World Economic Forum (WEF).
23	Ukraine	Kyiv	2 May 2024	Visited Kyiv to reiterate UK support for Ukraine and confirm a £36 million package of energy support. Met with President of Ukraine Volodymyr Zelenskyy, Prime Minister of Ukraine Denys Shmyhal and Foreign Minister Dmytro Kuleba.
24	Belgium	Brussels	20 May 2024	Traveled to Brussels for the next round of the post Brexit treaty negotiations on Gibraltar. He met with European Commission Executive Vice-President Maroš Šefčovič, Spanish Foreign Minister José Manuel Albares and the Chief Minister of Gibraltar Fabian Picardo.
25	Albania	Tirana	22 May 2024	Traveled to Tirana for bilateral discussions focused on migration. He met with Albania President Bajram Begaj, Albanian Prime Minister Edi Rama and Albanian Foreign Minister Igli Hasani. The trip was cut short, as Cameron had to return to the UK at short notice for the calling of the 2024 United Kingdom general election.
26	France	Paris	20 June 2024	Traveled to Paris to attend the GAVI Investment Opportunity and African Vaccine Manufacturing Accelerator launch.

== See also ==
- List of international trips made by foreign secretaries of the United Kingdom
- List of international prime ministerial trips made by David Cameron
- List of international trips made by David Lammy as Foreign Secretary of the United Kingdom
