= Convent Yard, Riga =

Area in Riga, Latvia

Coordinates: 56.9480639°N 24.1101515°E

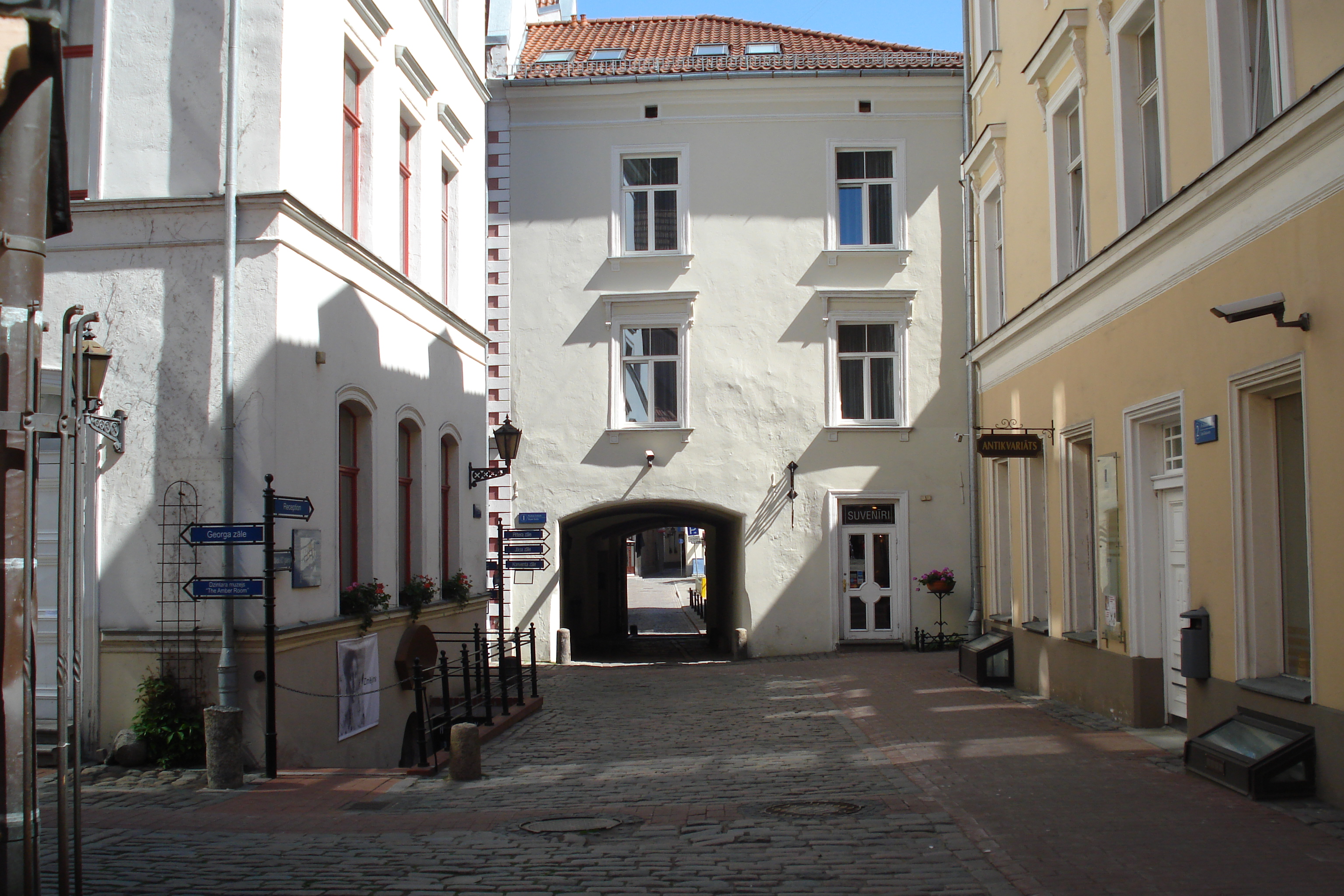
Convent Yard

The Convent Yard (Latvian: Konventa sēta) is situated in Riga, Latvia, and originates from the first half of the 13th century. It is some of the oldest part of Riga that has been preserved.
