= Lists of United States presidential trips =

This article contains lists of visits and trips by the president of the United States.

== Visits by state or territory ==
- List of United States presidential visits to Puerto Rico

== International trips ==
- List of international trips made by presidents of the United States

=== Trips by region ===
==== Americas ====
- List of United States presidential visits to Canada
- List of United States presidential visits to Mexico
- List of United States presidential visits to Central America
- List of United States presidential visits to the Caribbean
- List of United States presidential visits to South America

==== Asia ====
- List of United States presidential visits to East Asia
- List of United States presidential visits to South Asia
- List of United States presidential visits to Southeast Asia

==== Europe ====
- List of United States presidential visits to Eastern Europe and Northern Asia
- List of United States presidential visits to Northern Europe
- List of United States presidential visits to Southern Europe
- List of United States presidential visits to Western Europe
- List of United States presidential visits to the United Kingdom and Ireland

==== Other ====
- List of United States presidential visits to Australia and New Zealand
- List of United States presidential visits to the Middle East
- List of United States presidential visits to North Africa
- List of United States presidential visits to Sub-Saharan Africa

== Trips by president ==
=== Andrew Johnson ===
- Swing Around the Circle, 1866

=== Warren G. Harding ===
- Voyage of Understanding, 1923

=== Franklin D. Roosevelt ===
- List of international presidential trips made by Franklin D. Roosevelt

=== Harry S. Truman ===
- List of international presidential trips made by Harry S. Truman

=== Dwight D. Eisenhower ===
- List of international presidential trips made by Dwight D. Eisenhower

=== John F. Kennedy ===
- List of international presidential trips made by John F. Kennedy

=== Lyndon B. Johnson ===
- List of international presidential trips made by Lyndon B. Johnson

=== Richard Nixon ===
- List of international presidential trips made by Richard Nixon

=== Gerald Ford ===
- List of international presidential trips made by Gerald Ford
  - List of presidential trips made by Gerald Ford (1974)
  - List of presidential trips made by Gerald Ford (1975)
  - List of presidential trips made by Gerald Ford (1976–77)

=== Jimmy Carter ===
- List of international presidential trips made by Jimmy Carter
  - List of presidential trips made by Jimmy Carter (1977)
  - List of presidential trips made by Jimmy Carter (1978)
  - List of presidential trips made by Jimmy Carter (1979)
  - List of presidential trips made by Jimmy Carter (1980–81)

=== Ronald Reagan ===
- List of international presidential trips made by Ronald Reagan
  - List of presidential trips made by Ronald Reagan (1981)
  - List of presidential trips made by Ronald Reagan (1982)
  - List of presidential trips made by Ronald Reagan (1983)
  - List of presidential trips made by Ronald Reagan (1984)
  - List of presidential trips made by Ronald Reagan (1985)
  - List of presidential trips made by Ronald Reagan (1986)
  - List of presidential trips made by Ronald Reagan (1987)
  - List of presidential trips made by Ronald Reagan (1988–89)

=== George H. W. Bush ===
- List of international presidential trips made by George H. W. Bush
  - List of presidential trips made by George H. W. Bush (1989)
  - List of presidential trips made by George H. W. Bush (1990)
  - List of presidential trips made by George H. W. Bush (1991)
  - List of presidential trips made by George H. W. Bush (1992–93)

=== Bill Clinton ===
- List of international presidential trips made by Bill Clinton
  - List of presidential trips made by Bill Clinton (1993)
  - List of presidential trips made by Bill Clinton (1994)
  - List of presidential trips made by Bill Clinton (1995)
  - List of presidential trips made by Bill Clinton (1996)
  - List of presidential trips made by Bill Clinton (1997)
  - List of presidential trips made by Bill Clinton (1998)
  - List of presidential trips made by Bill Clinton (1999)
  - List of presidential trips made by Bill Clinton (2000–01)

=== George W. Bush ===
- List of international presidential trips made by George W. Bush
  - List of presidential trips made by George W. Bush (2001)
  - List of presidential trips made by George W. Bush (2002)
  - List of presidential trips made by George W. Bush (2003)
  - List of presidential trips made by George W. Bush (2004)
  - List of presidential trips made by George W. Bush (2005)
  - List of presidential trips made by George W. Bush (2006)
  - List of presidential trips made by George W. Bush (2007)
  - List of presidential trips made by George W. Bush (2008–09)

=== Barack Obama ===
- List of international presidential trips made by Barack Obama
  - List of presidential trips made by Barack Obama (2009)
  - List of presidential trips made by Barack Obama (2010)
  - List of presidential trips made by Barack Obama (2011)
  - List of presidential trips made by Barack Obama (2012)
  - List of presidential trips made by Barack Obama (2013)
  - List of presidential trips made by Barack Obama (2014)
  - List of presidential trips made by Barack Obama (2015)
  - List of presidential trips made by Barack Obama (2016–17)

=== Donald Trump ===
- List of international presidential trips made by Donald Trump
  - First Presidency
    - List of presidential trips made by Donald Trump (2017)
    - List of presidential trips made by Donald Trump (2018)
    - List of presidential trips made by Donald Trump (2019)
    - List of presidential trips made by Donald Trump (2020–21)
  - Second Presidency
    - List of presidential trips made by Donald Trump (2025)
    - List of presidential trips made by Donald Trump (2026)

=== Joe Biden ===
- List of international presidential trips made by Joe Biden
  - List of presidential trips made by Joe Biden (2021)
  - List of presidential trips made by Joe Biden (2022)
  - List of presidential trips made by Joe Biden (2023)
  - List of presidential trips made by Joe Biden (2024–25)
