= List of presidential trips made by Ronald Reagan (1985) =

This is a list of presidential trips made by Ronald Reagan during 1985, the fifth year of his presidency as the 40th president of the United States. International trips are highlighted in blue.

This list excludes trips made within Washington, D.C., the U.S. federal capital in which the White House, the official residence and principal workplace of the president, is located. It also excludes the capital's immediate surroundings in Maryland and Virginia, such as Andrews Air Force Base in Maryland, where the president typically boards Air Force One for all trips outside the area. Also excluded are trips to Camp David, the country residence of the president, and to Reagan's Rancho del Cielo ranch in Santa Barbara County, California.

== January ==
| State or country | Areas visited | Dates | Details |
|---|---|---|---|
| California | Palm Springs, Los Angeles | January 1–2 | Stayed at Sunnylands. Hosted Japanese prime minister Yasuhiro Nakasone at the Century Plaza Hotel. |

== February ==
No trips made

== March ==
| State or country | Areas visited | Dates | Details |
|---|---|---|---|
| Canada | Quebec City | March 17–18 | Shamrock Summit. Met with Prime Minister Brian Mulroney. |
| New York | New York | March 28 | Spoke at the New York Stock Exchange and at St. John's University. |

== April ==
| State or country | Areas visited | Dates | Details |
|---|---|---|---|
| West Germany | Bonn, Bergen-Belsen, Bitburg, Hambach Castle | April 30–May 6 | Attended the 11th G7 summit. Attended ceremonies commemorating 40th anniversary of the end of World War II in Europe. Reagan's brief visit to the Kolmeshöhe Military Cemetery in Bitburg was the subject of the Bitburg controversy. |

== May ==
| State or country | Areas visited | Dates | Details |
|---|---|---|---|
| Spain | Madrid | May 6–8 | State visit. Met with King Juan Carlos I and President Felipe González. |
| France | Strasbourg | May 8 | Addressed the European Parliament. |
| Portugal | Lisbon | May 8–10 | State visit. Met with President António Ramalho Eanes and Prime Minister Mário Soares. Addressed the National Assembly. |
| Maryland | Annapolis | May 22 | Gave the commencement address at the United States Naval Academy's Navy–Marine Corps Memorial Stadium. |
| Florida | Lake Buena Vista, Miami | May 27 | Visited Walt Disney World's EPCOT Center, attending a performance of some of the high school marching bands that had been scheduled to participate in Reagan's second inaugural parade in January, before that parade was canceled due to severe weather. Raised funds for Senator Paula Hawkins at the Omni International Hotel. |
| Virginia | Williamsburg | May 30 | Spoke at the "Prelude to Independence" event at the Colonial Williamsburg Capitol. |
| Wisconsin | Oshkosh | May 30 | Spoke about the Tax Reform Act at the Winnebago County Courthouse. |
| Pennsylvania | Malvern | May 31 | Spoke at the Great Valley Corporate Center. |

== June ==
| State or country | Areas visited | Dates | Details |
|---|---|---|---|
| Oklahoma | Oklahoma City | June 5 | Visited the AT&T Technologies automated computer plant on its 25th anniversary. Raised funds for Senator Don Nickles at the Skirvin Plaza Hotel. |
| Georgia | Atlanta | June 5–6 | Stayed at the Waverly Hotel, where he raised funds for Senator Mack Mattingly. Spoke at Northside High School. |
| Alabama | Birmingham | June 6 | Raised funds for Senator Jeremiah Denton at the Birmingham-Jefferson Civic Center. |
| New Jersey | Bloomfield | June 13 | Spoke at the Municipal Building. |
| Maryland | Baltimore | June 14 | Attended a Flag Day ceremony at Fort McHenry. |
| Indiana | Mooresville, Indianapolis | June 19 | Took questions from the Mooresville Chamber of Commerce at Mac's Family Restaurant. Addressed the Jaycees annual convention, the first at which women were admitted as members after the Roberts v. United States Jaycees decision, at the Indiana Convention Center. |
| Texas | Dallas | June 21 | Addressed the Lions Clubs International annual convention at Reunion Arena. |
| Illinois | Chicago Heights | June 28 | Attended a luncheon with community leaders in the teachers' lounge at Bloom High School. Met with family members of hostages taken from TWA Flight 847 in the school's library. |

== July ==
No trips made

== August ==
| State or country | Areas visited | Dates | Details |
|---|---|---|---|
| California | Los Angeles | August 21–23 | Stayed at the Century Plaza Hotel. |
| California | Santa Barbara | August 28 | Visited Barney Klinger's Hope Ranch. |

== September ==
| State or country | Areas visited | Dates | Details |
|---|---|---|---|
| Missouri | Independence | September 2 | Attended Santa-Cali-Gon Days, a festival celebrating the city's history as the beginning point of the Santa Fe, California, and Oregon Trails, at the Truman Courthouse. Visited William Chrisman High School. |
| North Carolina | Raleigh | September 5 | Spoke at North Carolina State University's Reynolds Coliseum. |
| Florida | Tampa | September 12 | Addressed the Senior Citizens Forum on Tax Reform at Curtis Hixon Hall. |
| New Hampshire | Concord | September 18 | Spoke at the New Hampshire State House. |
| Tennessee | Knoxville, Athens | September 24 | Addressed a symposium on establishing a "high-tech corridor" in Knoxville at the University of Tennessee's Carolyn P. Brown University Center. Spoke at the McMinn County Courthouse. |

== October ==
| State or country | Areas visited | Dates | Details |
|---|---|---|---|
| Ohio | St. Bernard, Cincinnati | October 3 | Visited the Ivorydale factory in St. Bernard. Addressed business leaders at the Clarion Hotel. |
| New Jersey | Parsippany | October 4 | Raised funds for the New Jersey Republican Party at the Parsippany Hilton. |
| Illinois | Deerfield, Chicago | October 10 | Visited Sara Lee Corporation headquarters in Deerfield. Took questions from students and faculty at Gordon Technical High School. |
| Idaho | Boise | October 15 | Raised funds for Senator Steve Symms at the Morrison Center for the Performing Arts. |
| Wisconsin | Milwaukee | October 15 | Raised funds for Senator Bob Kasten at the Milwaukee Auditorium. |
| New York | New York | October 23–25 | Addressed the opening session of the 40th United Nations General Assembly. Stayed at the Waldorf Astoria New York. |

== November ==
| State or country | Areas visited | Dates | Details |
|---|---|---|---|
| Switzerland | Geneva | November 16–21 | Attended the Geneva Summit with Soviet general secretary Mikhail Gorbachev. Met also with Swiss president Kurt Furgler. |
| Belgium | Brussels | November 21 | Attended the 1985 Brussels NATO summit. Present were the Heads of State and Government of Belgium, Canada, Denmark, Federal Republic of Germany, Italy, the Netherlands, Norway, Luxembourg, Portugal, Turkey and the United Kingdom. |

== December ==
| State or country | Areas visited | Dates | Details |
|---|---|---|---|
| California | Los Angeles, Burbank | December 1–2 | Stayed at the Century Plaza Hotel. Honored by the "All-Star Tribute to Ronald 'Dutch' Reagan" at NBC Studios. |
| Washington | Seattle | December 2 | Raised funds for Senator Slade Gorton at the Westin Seattle. |
| Maryland | Fallston | December 4 | Spoke at Fallston High School. |
| New York | New York | December 5–6 | Attended a dinner celebrating the 30th anniversary of National Review magazine at the Plaza Hotel. |
| Kentucky | Fort Campbell | December 16 | Attended a memorial service at Campbell Army Airfield for the victims of the crash of Arrow Air Flight 1285R. |
| California | Los Angeles, Palm Springs | December 27–31 | Stayed at the Century Plaza Hotel and Sunnylands. |
