= List of United States presidential visits to Puerto Rico =

Eleven United States presidents have made presidential visits to Puerto Rico since the islands became a U.S. territory in the aftermath of the Spanish–American War of 1898, which ended with the signing of the Treaty of Paris. The eleventh and most recent visit was by President Joe Biden on 3 October 2022, after Hurricane Fiona devastated center and southern and western parts of the island. The tenth visit was by President Donald Trump on 3 October 2017. Nine presidents are honored by life-sized bronze statues commissioned and placed in a linear park, called Paseo de los Presidentes, on the south side of the Puerto Rico Capitol in San Juan.

== Official visits ==
Official visits are formal visits (official visit) to the local government, during which the president acts as an official attendee of the local government at a public ceremony. Some official visits may also be surveying damage after a natural disaster.

=== Theodore Roosevelt ===
President Theodore Roosevelt was the first sitting president to visit Puerto Rico arriving on the USS Louisiana (BB 19) on 21 November 1906, after inspecting the Panama Canal. A bronze statue and plaque commemorating his visit is on public view at the Paseo de los Presidentes on the south side of the Capitol of Puerto Rico.

=== Herbert Hoover ===
President Herbert Hoover was the second president to visit America's most populated territory during March 1931 on board the USS Arizona (BB 39) which called at Ponce. His bronze statue was unveiled in 2008 by his great-granddaughter, Fox News commentator Margaret Hoover and then-Senate President Kenneth McClintock and subsequently installed with a bronze plaque by Senate President Thomas Rivera-Schatz and House Speaker Jenniffer González-Colón at the Paseo de los Presidentes.

=== Franklin D. Roosevelt ===
President Franklin D. Roosevelt visited Puerto Rico during 6–7 July 1934 on board the USS Houston (CA 30). The commemorative statue honoring his visit was unveiled in April 2008 by the 42nd president of the United States, Bill Clinton, then-Senate President McClintock and House Speaker José Aponte-Hernández. The statue is believed to be only the third to depict him sitting in a wheelchair (the other two are located in the FDR Memorial in Washington, DC). Next to his statue, there is a bronze depiction of his pet dog, Fala. The statue, the bronze depiction of the dog and a plaque were subsequently installed by Senate President Rivera-Schatz and Speaker González-Colón at the Paseo de los Presidentes.

=== John F. Kennedy ===
President John F. Kennedy and his wife visited Puerto Rico on 15–16 December 1961, arriving in a VC-137A, spending the night as guests of Gov. Luis Muñoz Marín at La Fortaleza, the oldest executive mansion in continuous use in the Western Hemisphere. The guest bedroom in which he stayed subsequently became known as the "Kennedy Bedroom". On 16 December they continued the flight to Venezuela. Upon the completion of the South American tour, they flew from Colombia to Ramey AFB for a refuel stop on 18 December and continued to Palm Beach, Florida. Kennedy did not leave the aircraft during that stop at Ramey. Until President Obama's 14 June 2011, trip to Puerto Rico, for over 49 years Kennedy's visit, which included a motorcade in addition to the visit to the governor's mansion, had been considered the last official visit by a sitting president at the time, notwithstanding President Johnson's private visit in 1968 to Ramey AFB in Aguadilla and President Ford's attendance at the 1976 G-7 summit in Dorado. Then-Senator Kennedy had previously visited Puerto Rico while on the presidential campaign trail, even though he had not yet announced his candidacy, giving a speech entitled "A New Attitude on Latin America" at a Democratic-fundraising dinner in San Juan on 15 December 1958.

=== Barack Obama ===
President Barack Obama made an official visit to Puerto Rico for four hours on 14 June 2011. Arriving on Air Force One a VC-25A (Boeing 747) 92–8000 with then-Resident Commissioner Pedro Pierluisi, he was greeted at Muñiz Air National Guard Base in Carolina, Puerto Rico, by Governor Luis Fortuño, visited La Fortaleza, the oldest executive mansion in continuous use in the Western Hemisphere, had lunch at a local eatery with then-Senator Alejandro García Padilla, gave exclusive interviews to Univision local TV affiliate reporter Cyd Marie Fleming and El Nuevo Día newspaper, and attended a Democratic National Committee event that added nearly $1 million to his campaign coffers, before flying to Washington, D.C., with Pierluisi. A bronze statue of him commemorating the visit was commissioned by, and installed at the Paseo de los Presidentes by then-Senate President Thomas Rivera-Schatz and House Speaker Jenniffer González-Colón. It is considered one of the first public statues depicting the then-sitting president during the first of two full terms in office.

=== Donald Trump ===
President Donald Trump visited Puerto Rico for about four hours on 3 October 2017, to discuss Hurricane Maria. Trump arrived on Air Force One at the Muñiz Air National Guard Base together with First Lady Melania Trump and Jenniffer González-Colón, the first woman ever to hold the office of Puerto Rico's sole Representative to the U.S. Congress, they shook the hands of military members stationed at the base. He later held a press briefing on relief efforts- which was also attended by San Juan Mayor Carmen Yulín Cruz and various Puerto Rican officials-, held a meeting with senior military personnel— as well as with Governors Ricardo Rosselló of Puerto Rico and Kenneth Mapp of the U.S. Virgin Islands— visited with people who were impacted by the storm, and met with members of the Navy and Marine Corps. Following the tradition set by President McClintock and Speaker Hernández in 2008, eventually a bronze statue and plaque commemorating President Trump's visit is expected to be commissioned and installed at the Paseo de los Presidentes. As of October 2022, there has been no official news as to when a statue of Trump will be commissioned.

=== Joe Biden ===
President Joe Biden made a visit to Ponce, Puerto Rico with First Lady Jill Biden 3 October 2022, to discuss Hurricane Fiona and the Federal Governments response. He landed at Mercedita International Airport. He announced in a press conference with Governor Pedro Pierluisi that there would be 60 million dollars of relief to the island. President Biden also visited the Centro Sor Isolina Ferré Aguayo School after speaking at the ports of Ponce, and met with the Mayor of Ponce, Irrizary Pabón. He is the first President of the United States to make a visit to Ponce. The tradition set by President McClintock and Speaker Hernández in 2008, eventually a bronze statue and plaque commemorating President Biden's visit is expected to be commissioned and installed at the Paseo de los Presidentes (Walkway of the presidents). After his visit, there has not been any official news as to when a statue of Biden will be commissioned.

== Unofficial visits ==
Unofficial visits are vacations, fund-raising for campaigns, having never left a military base or naval vessel, and other personal reasons (golf, etc.) where the president is not an attendee of the local government.

=== Dwight Eisenhower ===
President Dwight D. Eisenhower also visited Puerto Rico on his way to a goodwill visit to South America. Landed at San Juan International airport in a VC-137A on 22 February 1960, and was received by Gov. Luis Muñoz Marín. Later that day he flew to Ramey Air Force Base, PR where he spent the night. The next day he continued his flight to Brasilia, Brazil. Upon completion of his South American tour he returned to Ramey AFB on 3 March staying there until 7 March on vacation. During that time he played golf at Ramey AFB and at the Dorado Beach Hotel to where he flew in a U.S. Army VH-34 on 4 March and again on 6 March in a U.S. Air Force C-47 from Ramey. The bronze statue commemorating that visit is one of the first seven commissioned by the Puerto Rico Legislature.

=== Harry S. Truman ===
President Harry S. Truman, who in 1946 appointed the last appointive governor, and first Puerto Rican to officially become the territory's chief executive, Jesús T. Piñero, signed the Elective Governors Act of 1947, and allowed Puerto Ricans to draft their own constitution, also visited Puerto Rico during his tenure as president. On 21 February 1948, he landed at the Isla Grande airport on board a VC-54C and left for St. Thomas the next day on board the presidential yacht USS Williamsburg (AGC 369). A life-sized bronze statue and plaque commemorating his visit was unveiled by Senate President McClintock and House Speaker Aponte-Hernández is exhibited on the south side of the Puerto Rico Capitol building.

=== Lyndon B. Johnson ===
President Lyndon B. Johnson visited Ramey Air Force Base in Aguadilla on 2–4 March 1968 in a private trip that began in Beaumont, Texas, and a layover in Marietta, Georgia to inaugurate the first C-5A military aircraft before flying to Puerto Rico. He arrived in a VC-137C at 5:10 pm AST. During his trip he remained on-base during his entire stay and had no contact with Puerto Rican officials, except for a brief welcoming call from former Governor Luis Muñoz Marín on 3 March. He was accompanied by Congressman J. J. Pickle, among others. The statue commemorating his visit was commissioned by President Rivera Schatz and Speaker González, after Aguadilla native Haydeé Reichard called former-Senate President McClintock's attention to the omission of Johnson's statue, subsequently installed at the Paseo de los Presidentes.

=== Gerald Ford ===
While President Gerald Ford visited Puerto Rico on 26–28 June 1976, arriving in VC-137C 72-7000 to attend the second annual G-7 economic summit, his trip is not considered an official visit to Puerto Rico, although he was welcomed by Governor Rafael Hernández Colón at the airport. Ford was helicoptered with a HMX-1's VH-1N in and out of, and remained within the Dorado Beach Hotel, now Dorado Beach Resort, site of the summit. His statue, now placed at the "Paseo de los Presidentes", was unveiled in 2008 by his oldest son, the Rev. Michael Ford, and President McClintock and Speaker Aponte-Hernández at a ceremony in the Capitol Rotunda, where Rev. Ford was seen weeping upon seeing his father's sculpted depiction for the first time.

== See also ==
- Lists of United States presidential trips
- Political status of Puerto Rico
