= List of United States presidential visits to South Asia =

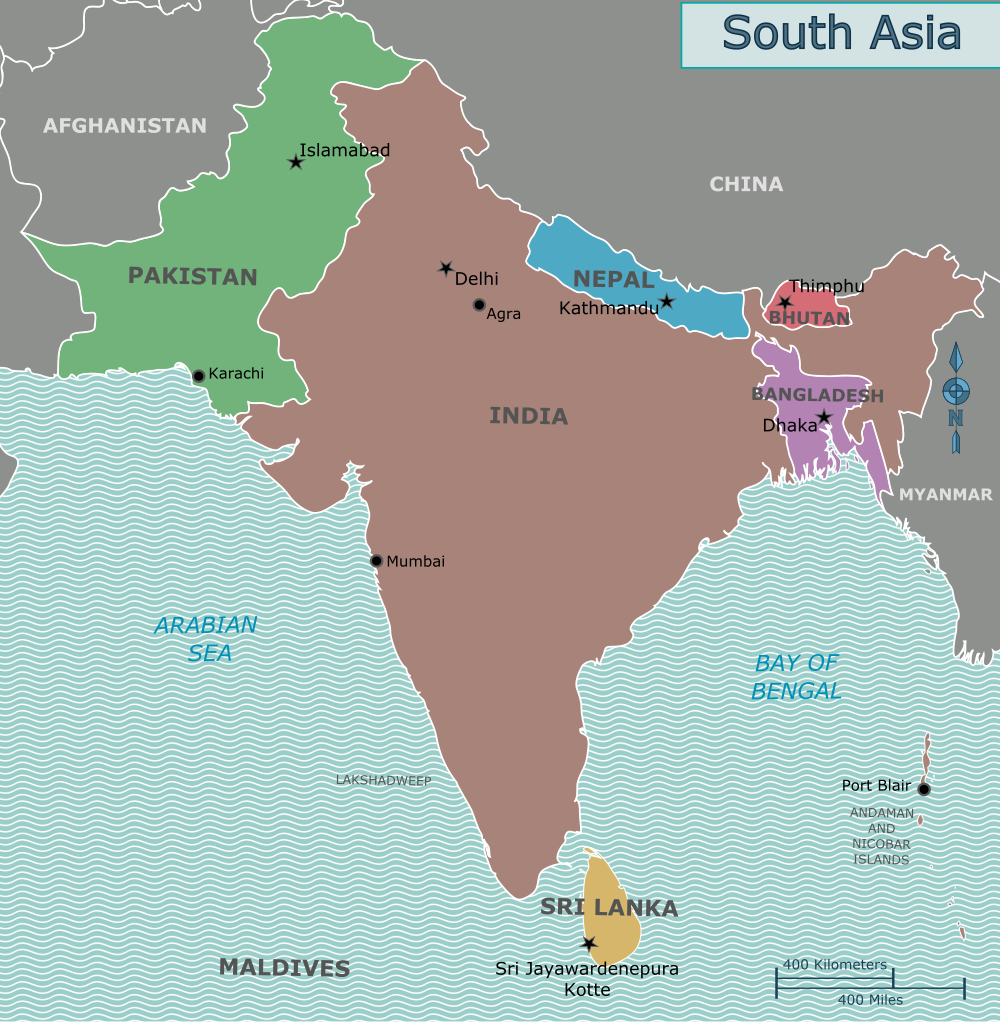
The eight countries of South Asia.

Eight presidents of the United States have made presidential visits to South Asia. The first trip by a sitting president to South Asia was by Dwight D. Eisenhower in 1959. Of the eight countries in the region, only four of them have been visited by a sitting American president: Afghanistan, Bangladesh, India and Pakistan. The other four countries, Bhutan (which has no formal diplomatic relations with the US), the Maldives, Nepal and Sri Lanka, have never been visited by a sitting American president.

== Table of visits ==
Total Number of Visits in each country in South Asia
Countries	Total Number of visits
India	9
Afghanistan	8
Pakistan	5
Bangladesh	1
Sri Lanka	0
Nepal	0
Maldives	0
Bhutan	0

President	Dates	Countries	Locations	Key details
Dwight D. Eisenhower	December 7–9, 1959	Pakistan	Karachi	Informal visit. Met with President Ayub Khan. Witnessed Australia VS Pakistan cricket match. Became only US President ever to watch international cricket match in stadium.
Dwight D. Eisenhower	December 9, 1959	Afghanistan	Kabul	Informal visit. Met with King Mohammed Zahir Shah.
Dwight D. Eisenhower	December 9–14, 1959	India	New Delhi, Agra	Met with President Rajendra Prasad and Prime Minister Jawaharlal Nehru. Addressed Parliament.
Lyndon B. Johnson	December 23, 1967	Pakistan	Karachi	1 hour stopover visit. Met with President Ayub Khan.
Richard Nixon	July 31 – August 1, 1969	India	New Delhi	State visit. Met with Acting President Mohammad Hidayatullah. Prime Minister is Indira Gandhi
Richard Nixon	August 1–2, 1969	Pakistan	Lahore	State visit. Met with President Yahya Khan.
Jimmy Carter	January 1–3, 1978	India	New Delhi, Daulatpur Nasirabad	Met with President Neelam Sanjiva Reddy and Prime Minister Morarji Desai. Addressed Parliament of India.
Bill Clinton	March 19–25, 2000	India	New Delhi, Agra, Jaipur, Hyderabad, Mumbai	Met with President Kocheril Raman Narayanan. Signed Joint Statement on Energy and the Environment. Addressed the Indian Parliament.
Bill Clinton	March 20, 2000	Bangladesh	Dhaka	Met with President Shahabuddin Ahmed and Prime Minister Sheikh Hasina.
Bill Clinton	March 25, 2000	Pakistan	Islamabad	6 hours visit. Met with President Rafiq Tarar and General Pervez Musharraf. Delivered radio address.
George W. Bush	March 1, 2006	Afghanistan	Bagram, Kabul	Met with President Hamid Karzai. Dedicated new U.S. Embassy. Addressed U.S. military personnel.
George W. Bush	March 1–3, 2006	India	New Delhi, Hyderabad	Met with Prime Minister Manmohan Singh. Signed U.S.-India Civil Nuclear Agreement.
George W. Bush	March 3–4, 2006	Pakistan	Islamabad	Met with President Pervez Musharraf.
George W. Bush	December 14–15, 2008	Afghanistan	Kabul	Met with President Hamid Karzai. Visited U.S. military personnel.
Barack Obama	March 27–28, 2010	Afghanistan	Bagram, Kabul	Met with President Hamid Karzai. Addressed U.S. military personnel.
Barack Obama	November 6–9, 2010	India	Mumbai, New Delhi	Participated in the US-India Business Council and Entrepreneurship Summit in Mumbai. Held a town hall meeting with Mumbai students. Met with President Pratibha Patil and Prime Minister Manmohan Singh. Addressed the Indian Parliament. Visited the Humayun's Tomb and the Raj Ghat.
Barack Obama	December 3, 2010	Afghanistan	Bagram	Met with the leaders of the U.S. military and diplomatic missions and visited U.S. military personnel.
Barack Obama	May 1–2, 2012	Afghanistan	Kabul	Met with President Karzai and addressed U.S. military personnel. Signed a long-term strategic partnership agreement between Afghanistan and United States. Addressed the nation from there regarding the responsible end of the Afghanistan war.
Barack Obama	May 25–26, 2014	Afghanistan	Bagram	Visited with U.S. troops.
Barack Obama	January 25–27, 2015	India	New Delhi	Met with Prime Minister Narendra Modi. Participated in the Indian Republic Day celebration, becoming the first US President to do so. Addressed an event organized by the US-India Business Council
Donald Trump	November 28, 2019	Afghanistan	Bagram	Visited with U.S military personnel serving in Eastern Afghanistan.
Donald Trump	February 24–25, 2020	India	Ahmedabad, Agra, New Delhi	Met with Prime Minister Narendra Modi. Attended Namaste Trump Event at Sardar Patel Stadium. Visited Taj Mahal at Agra.
Joe Biden	September 8–10, 2023	India	New Delhi	Attended 2023 G20 summit.

== Gallery ==
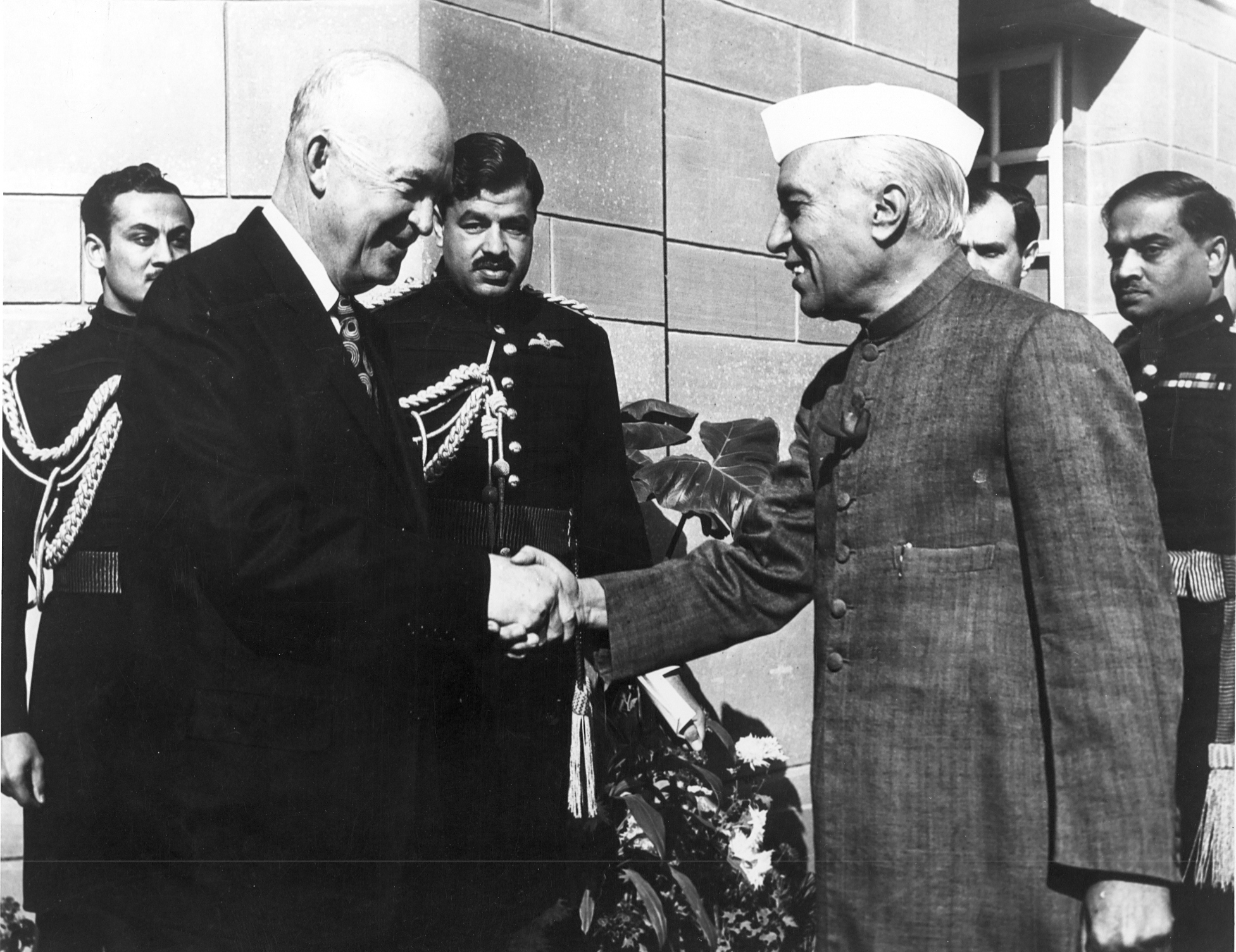
President Dwight D. Eisenhower received by Prime minister of India Jawaharlal Nehru at Parliament House in New Delhi, India, 1959

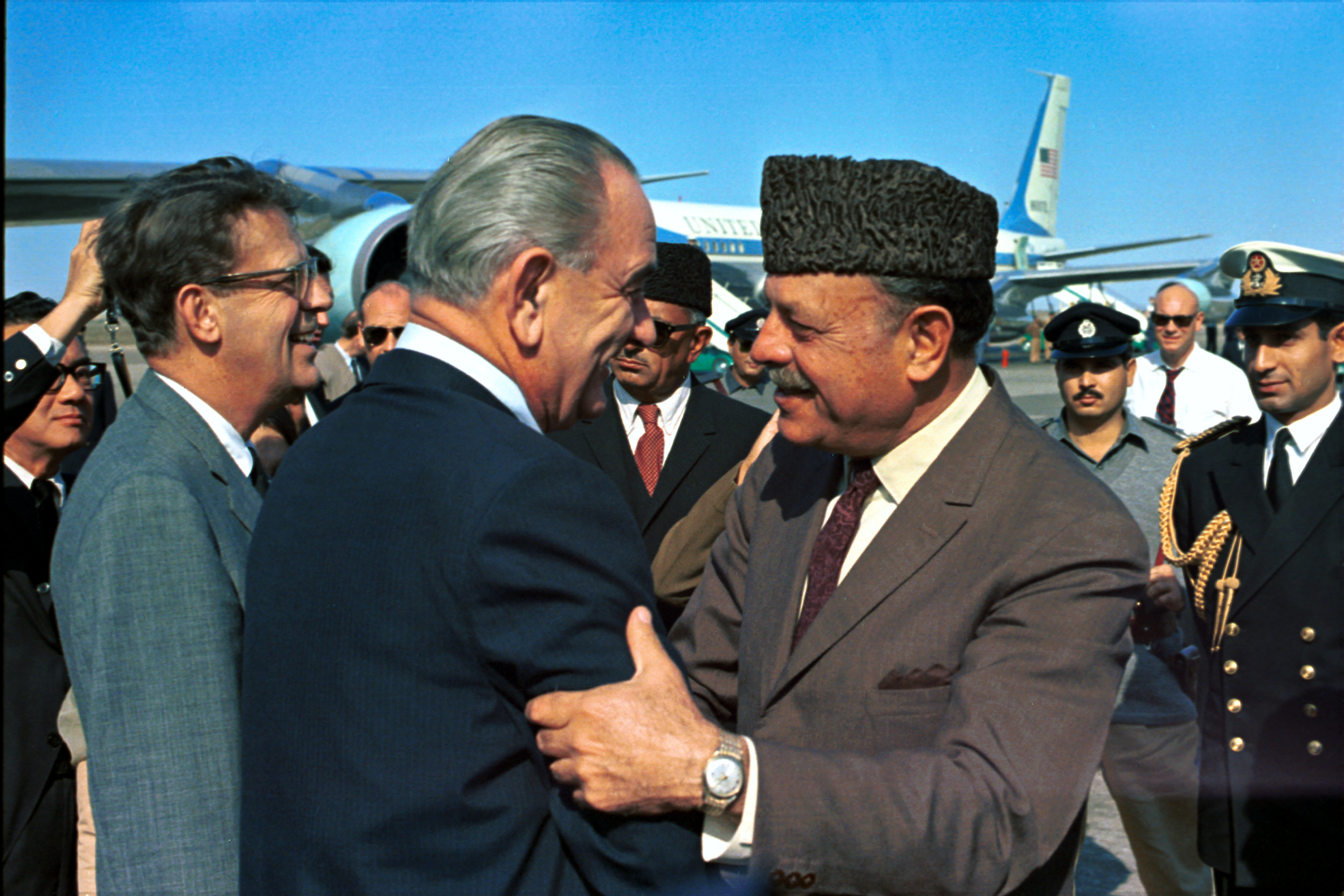
President Lyndon B. Johnson welcomed by President of Pakistan Ayub Khan in Karachi, Pakistan, December 23, 1967

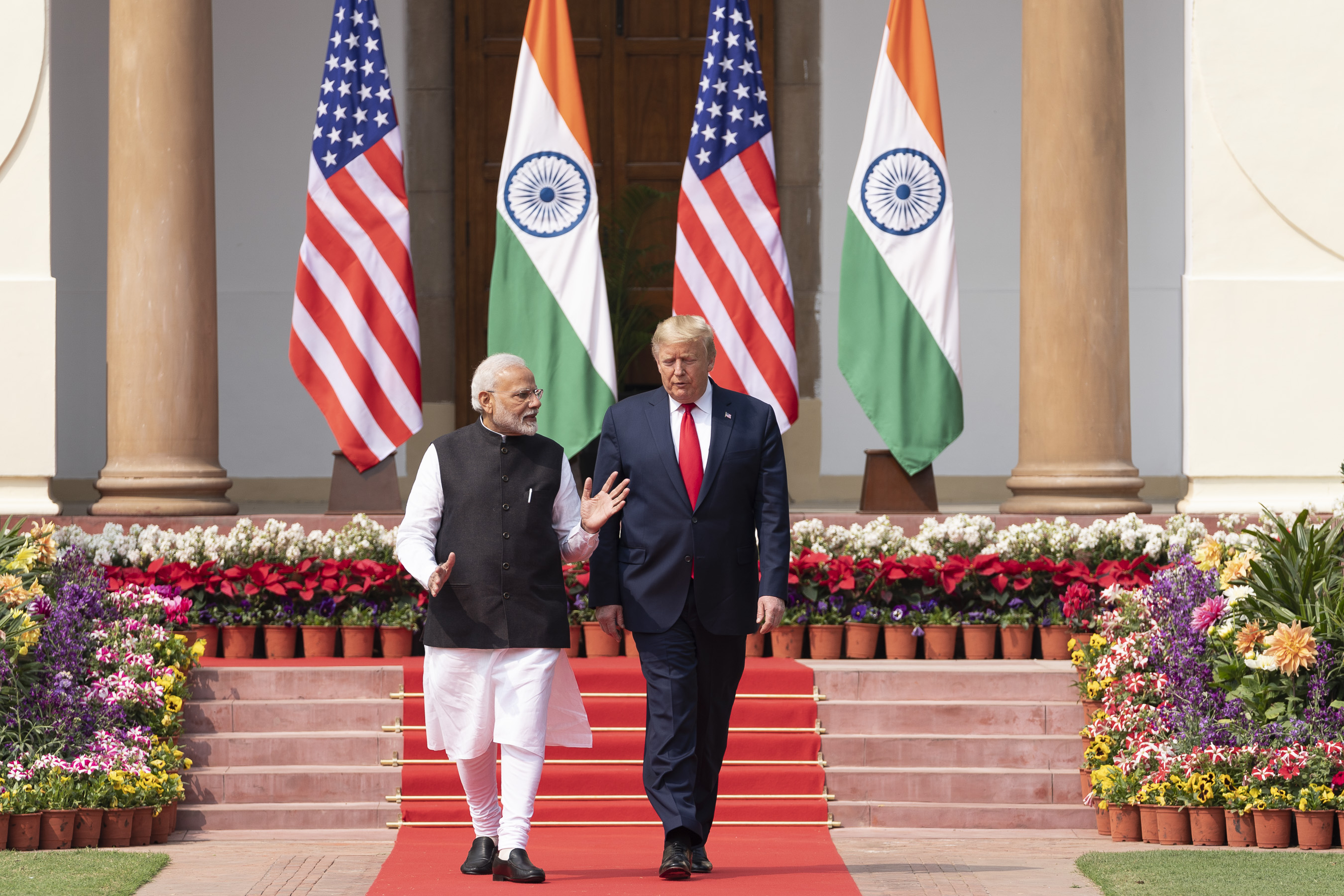
President Donald Trump and Prime minister of India Narendra Modi in New Delhi, India, February 25, 2020

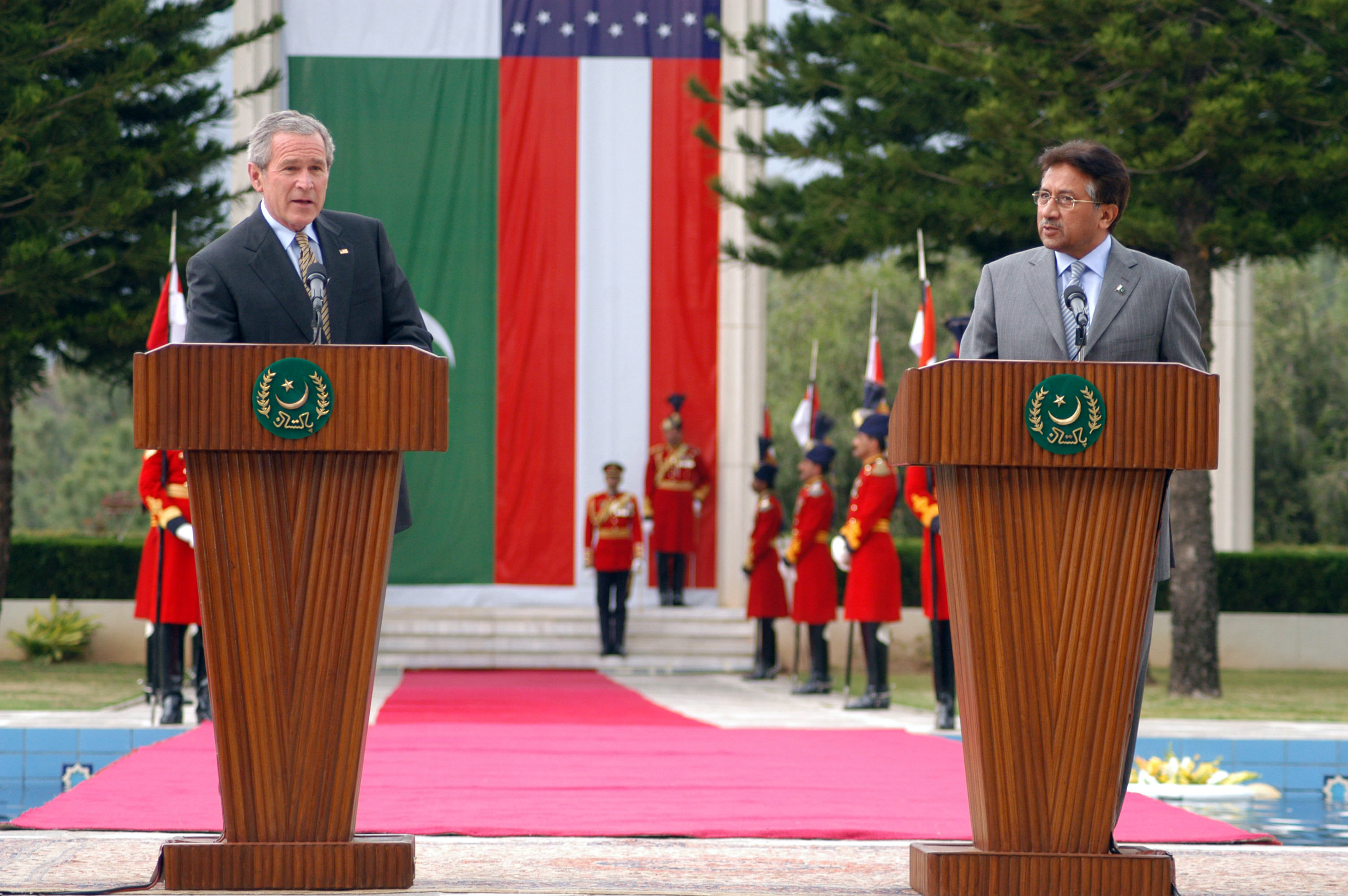
President George W. Bush with President of Pakistan Pervez Musharraf in Islamabad, Pakistan, March 4, 2006

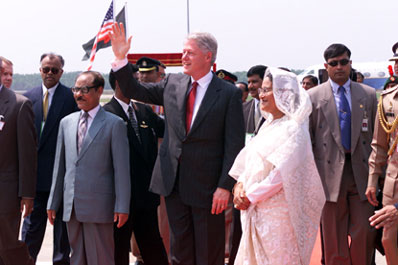
President Bill Clinton with Prime Minister of Bangladesh Sheikh Hasina in Dhaka, Bangladesh, March 20, 2000

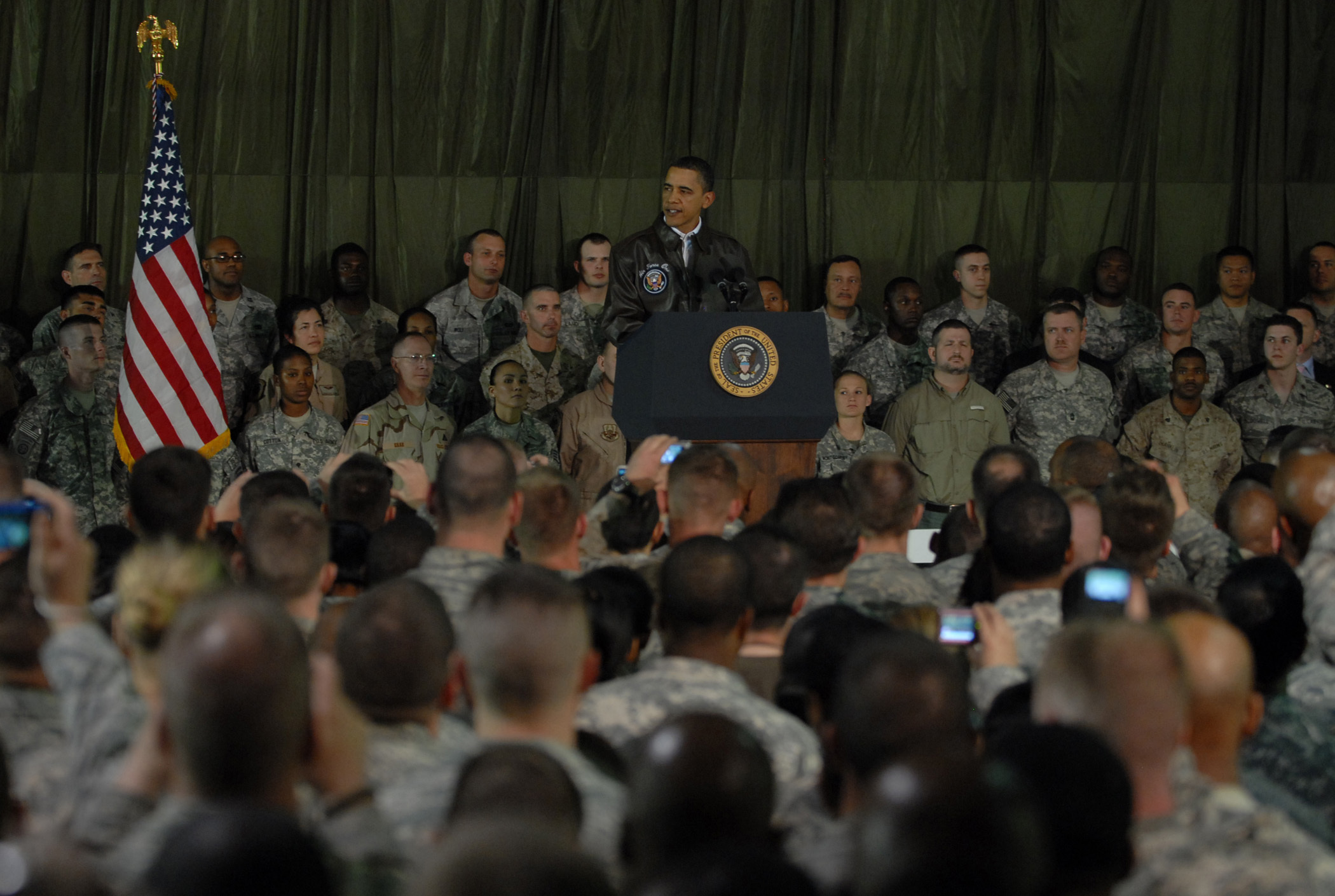
President Barack Obama addresses US Troops during his surprise visit in Afghanistan, March 28, 2010

== See also ==
- Bureau of South and Central Asian Affairs
- Foreign policy of the United States
- South Asian foreign policy of the Barack Obama administration
