= List of United States presidential visits to South America =

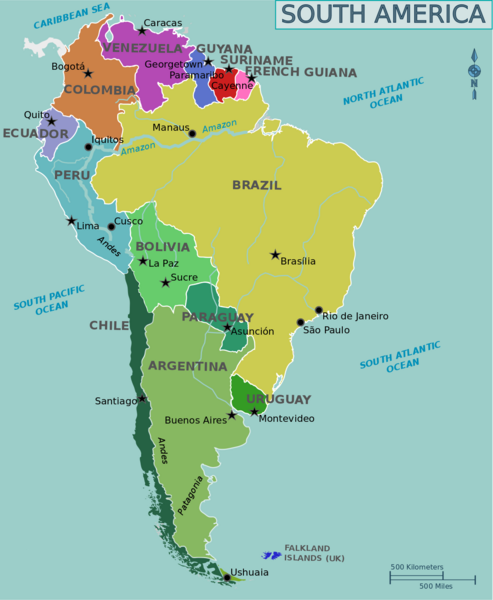
The countries of South America and their capitals

Eleven United States presidents and one president-elect have made presidential visits to South America. The first trip was made by Herbert Hoover (as president-elect) in 1928. During this tour he delivered twenty-five speeches in ten Central and South American countries, almost all of which stressed his plans to reduce American political and military interference in Latin American affairs. In sum, he pledged that the United States would act as a "good neighbor."

The first official visits by a sitting president were those of Franklin D. Roosevelt, and were an offshoot of Allied diplomatic interactions during World War II. Of the 12 independent countries on the continent, all but Bolivia, Guyana and Paraguay have been visited by an American president. Ecuador has only been visited by a president elect.

== Table of visits ==
President	Dates	Countries	Locations	Key details
Herbert Hoover	December 1, 1928	Ecuador	Guayaquil	Met with President Isidro Ayora.
Herbert Hoover	December 5, 1928	Peru	Lima	Met with President Augusto B. Leguía.
Herbert Hoover	December 8–11, 1928	Chile	Antofagasta, Santiago	Met with President Carlos Ibáñez del Campo. Met with Bolivian diplomats to discuss the ongoing Tacna–Arica dispute.
Herbert Hoover	December 13–15, 1928	Argentina	Buenos Aires	Met with President Hipólito Yrigoyen. Also reported to (U.S.) President Calvin Coolidge on the success of his tour via telegraph.
Herbert Hoover	December 16–18, 1928	Uruguay	Montevideo	Met with President Juan Campisteguy, and addressed the National Council of Administration.
Herbert Hoover	December 21–23, 1928	Brazil	Rio de Janeiro	Met with President Washington Luís; addressed the National Congress and the Supreme Federal Court.
Franklin D. Roosevelt	July 10, 1934	Colombia	Cartagena	Informal visit en route to vacation in Hawaii.
Franklin D. Roosevelt	November 27, 1936	Brazil	Rio de Janeiro	Addressed the National Congress of Brazil.
Franklin D. Roosevelt	November 30 – December 2, 1936	Argentina	Buenos Aires	Attended session of Inter-American Conference for the Maintenance of Peace.
Franklin D. Roosevelt	December 3, 1936	Uruguay	Montevideo	Official visit. Met with President Gabriel Terra.
Franklin D. Roosevelt	January 12, 1943	Brazil	Belém	Overnight stop en route to Casablanca.
Franklin D. Roosevelt	January 28, 1943	Brazil	Natal	Informal visit (following Casablanca Conference); met with President Getúlio Vargas.
Harry S. Truman	September 1–7, 1947	Brazil	Rio de Janeiro	State visit; addressed Inter-American Conference for the Maintenance of Continental Peace and Security and the Brazilian Congress.
Dwight D. Eisenhower	February 23–26, 1960	Brazil	Brasília; Rio de Janeiro, São Paulo	Met with President Juscelino Kubitschek and addressed Brazilian Congress.
Dwight D. Eisenhower	February 26–29, 1960	Argentina	Buenos Aires, Mar del Plata, San Carlos de Bariloche	Met with President Arturo Frondizi.
Dwight D. Eisenhower	February 29 – March 2, 1960	Chile	Santiago	Met with President Jorge Alessandri.
Dwight D. Eisenhower	March 2–3, 1960	Uruguay	Montevideo	Met with President Benito Nardone.
John F. Kennedy	December 16–17, 1961	Venezuela	Caracas	Met with President Rómulo Betancourt.
John F. Kennedy	December 17, 1961	Colombia	Bogotá	Met with President Alberto Lleras Camargo.
Lyndon B. Johnson	April 11–14, 1967	Uruguay	Punta del Este	Summit Meeting with Latin American Heads of State.
Lyndon B. Johnson	April 14, 1967	Suriname	Paramaribo	Refuelling stop en route from Uruguay.
Jimmy Carter	March 28–29, 1978	Venezuela	Caracas	Met with President Carlos Andrés Pérez. Addressed Congress and signed maritime boundary agreement.
Jimmy Carter	March 29–31, 1978	Brazil	Brasília, Rio de Janeiro	Official visit; met with President Ernesto Geisel and addressed Brazilian Congress.
Ronald Reagan	November 30 – December 3, 1982	Brazil	Brasília, São Paulo	Official working visit; met with President João Figueiredo.
Ronald Reagan	December 3, 1982	Colombia	Bogotá	Official Working Visit. Met with President Belisario Betancur.
George H. W. Bush	February 15, 1990	Colombia	Cartagena	Attended Summit Meeting on the control of illicit drug trafficking with President Virgilio Barco Vargas, Bolivian President Jaime Paz Zamora and Peruvian President Alan García.
George H. W. Bush	December 3–4, 1990	Brazil	Brasília	Met with President Fernando Collor de Mello and addressed a Joint Session of the Brazilian Congress.
George H. W. Bush	December 4–5, 1990	Uruguay	Montevideo	Met with President Luis Alberto Lacalle. Addressed a Joint Session of the Uruguayan General Assembly.
George H. W. Bush	December 5–6, 1990	Argentina	Buenos Aires	Met with President Carlos Menem and addressed a Joint Session of the Argentine National Congress.
George H. W. Bush	December 6–7, 1990	Chile	Santiago	Met with President Patricio Aylwin and addressed a Joint Session of the Chilean National Congress.
George H. W. Bush	December 7–8, 1990	Venezuela	Caracas	Met with President Carlos Andrés Pérez.
George H. W. Bush	June 12–13, 1992	Brazil	Rio de Janeiro	Attended the Earth Summit meeting.
Bill Clinton	October 12–13, 1997	Venezuela	Caracas	Met with President Rafael Caldera.
Bill Clinton	October 13–15, 1997	Brazil	Brasília, São Paulo, Rio de Janeiro	Met with President Fernando Henrique Cardoso; delivered several public addresses
Bill Clinton	October 15–18, 1997	Argentina	Buenos Aires, Bariloche	Met with President Menem; delivered several public addresses.
Bill Clinton	April 16–19, 1998	Chile	Santiago	State visit. Attended the 2nd Summit of the Americas.
Bill Clinton	August 30, 1998	Colombia	Cartagena	Met with President Andrés Pastrana Arango.
George W. Bush	March 23–24, 2002	Peru	Lima	Met with the Presidents of Peru, Colombia, and Bolivia, and with the Vice President of Ecuador.
George W. Bush	November 19–22, 2004	Chile	Santiago	Attended 16th APEC Summit.
George W. Bush	November 22, 2004	Colombia	Cartagena	Met with President Álvaro Uribe.
George W. Bush	November 3–5, 2005	Argentina	Mar del Plata	Attended 4th Summit of the Americas.
George W. Bush	November 5–6, 2005	Brazil	Brasília	Met with President Luiz Inácio Lula da Silva.
George W. Bush	March 8–9, 2007	Brazil	São Paulo	Met with President Lula da Silva.
George W. Bush	March 9–11, 2007	Uruguay	Montevideo	Met with President Tabaré Vázquez.
George W. Bush	March 11, 2007	Colombia	Bogotá	Met with President Álvaro Uribe.
George W. Bush	November 21–23, 2008	Peru	Lima	Attended the APEC Summit Meeting.
Barack Obama	March 19–21, 2011	Brazil	Brasília, Rio de Janeiro	Met with President Dilma Rousseff.
Barack Obama	March 21–22, 2011	Chile	Santiago	Met with President Sebastián Piñera.
Barack Obama	April 13–15, 2012	Colombia	Cartagena	Attended the 6th Summit of the Americas. Attended a leaders' dinner at the Castillo San Felipe de Barajas prior to the meeting. Announced, along with President Juan Manuel Santos, that the United States–Colombia Free Trade Agreement would take effect May 15, 2012.
Barack Obama	March 23–24, 2016	Argentina	Buenos Aires, Bariloche	Official visit. Met with President Mauricio Macri. Laid a wreath at the Buenos Aires Metropolitan Cathedral.
Barack Obama	November 18–20, 2016	Peru	Lima	Attended the APEC Summit Meeting.
Donald Trump	November 29 – December 1, 2018	Argentina	Buenos Aires	Attended the G20 summit.
Joe Biden	November 14–17, 2024	Peru	Lima	Attended the APEC Summit Meeting.
Joe Biden	November 17–19, 2024	Brazil	Rio de Janeiro, Manaus	Attended the G20 summit. It was the first time a sitting American president had visited the Amazon.

== Travels of former presidents ==
=== Theodore Roosevelt ===
Theodore Roosevelt, along with Cândido Rondon, explorered the 1000-mile long "River of Doubt" (later renamed Rio Roosevelt) located in a remote area of the Amazon basin in 1913–14. Sponsored in part by the American Museum of Natural History, they also collected many new animal and insect specimens.

=== Jimmy Carter ===
Jimmy Carter, along with Carter Center personnel, met with São Paulo Governor José Serra and former president Fernando Cardoso; received special human rights award; and met with a roundtable of preeminent business and financial leaders in São Paulo. Also met with President Lula da Silva, Foreign Minister Celso Amorim, and other Brazilian leaders in Brasilia, May 3–4, 2009.

== See also ==
- Foreign policy of the United States
- Latin America–United States relations
