= List of presidential trips made by Gerald Ford (1974) =

Wikimedia list article

This is a list of presidential trips made by Gerald Ford during 1974, the first year of his presidency as the 38th president of the United States. International trips are highlighted in blue.

This list excludes trips made within Washington, D.C., the U.S. federal capital in which the White House, the official residence and principal workplace of the president, is located. It also excludes the capital's immediate surroundings in Maryland and Virginia, such as Andrews Air Force Base in Maryland, where the president typically boards Air Force One for all trips outside the area. Also excluded are trips to Camp David, the country residence of the president.

== August ==
State or country	Areas visited	Dates	Details
Illinois	Chicago	August 19	Addressed the Veterans of Foreign Wars convention at The Conrad Hilton.
Ohio	Columbus	August 30	Gave a convocation address at Ohio State University's St. John Arena.

== September ==
State or country	Areas visited	Dates	Details
Pennsylvania	Philadelphia	September 6	Attended a dinner celebrating the 200th anniversary of the First Continental Congress at Independence Hall.
Pennsylvania	Pittsburgh	September 9	Addressed the International Conference on Urban Transportation at the Pittsburgh Hilton. Toured Carnot Elementary School.
North Carolina	Pinehurst	September 11	Dedicated the World Golf Hall of Fame, then golfed at the neighboring Pinehurst Resort.
Michigan	Detroit	September 23	Addressed the World Energy Conference at Cobo Hall.

== October ==
State or country	Areas visited	Dates	Details
Vermont	Burlington	October 7	Attended a reception honoring retiring Senator George Aiken at the Ramada Inn and a dinner at the Patrick Gym.
Michigan	Detroit	October 10	Attended a Republican reception at the Hotel Pontchartrain. Addressed the General Convention of the American Lutheran Church at Cobo Hall.
Missouri	Kansas City	October 15–16	Addressed the Future Farmers of America convention at Municipal Auditorium. Stayed at the Muehlebach Hotel, where he attended a breakfast for Republican candidates.
South Dakota	Sioux Falls	October 16	Attended a Republican reception at an American Automobile Association office. Spoke at a campaign rally at Sioux Falls Arena.
Nebraska	Lincoln	October 16	Spoke at a campaign rally at Lincoln Municipal Airport.
Indiana	Indianapolis	October 16	Attended a Republican reception at the Indiana Convention-Exposition Center.
South Carolina	Anderson, Rock Hill, Greenville	October 19	Dedicated the new Anderson Independent and Anderson Daily Mail building. Spoke at Rock Hill Mall. Attended a Republican reception at Greenville Memorial Auditorium.
North Carolina	Greensboro	October 19	Spoke at a campaign rally at Greensboro–High Point Airport.
Kentucky	Louisville	October 19	Rested at the Executive Inn. Attended a Republican reception at Freedom Hall.
Mexico	Nogales, Magdalena de Kino	October 21	Met with President Luis Echeverría and laid a wreath at the tomb of Padre Eusebio Kino.
Arizona	Tubac, Tucson	October 21	Traveled with President Echeverría to Tubac Country Club for a luncheon and joint press conference, and a final ceremony together at Davis–Monthan Air Force Base before parting ways.
Oklahoma	Oklahoma City	October 21–22	Stayed at the Skirvin Plaza Hotel. Campaigned for Senator Henry Bellmon at the Myriad Convention Center.
Ohio	Cleveland	October 22	Attended a Republican reception at the Sheraton-Cleveland Hotel.
Iowa	Des Moines	October 24	Spoke at a campaign rally at the Iowa State Capitol. Attended a Republican reception at the Val-Air Ballroom.
Illinois	Melvin, Chicago	October 24	Attended a ceremony honoring retiring Representative Leslie C. Arends at the Ford County Fairgrounds in Melvin. Attended a Republican reception at The Conrad Hilton.
Michigan	Grand Rapids	October 29	Attended a ceremony welcoming him home at Calder Plaza. Attended a Republican reception at the Hospitality Motor Inn. Spoke at Calvin College's Knollcrest Fieldhouse.
Iowa	Sioux City	October 31	Campaigned for Representative Wiley Mayne at Sioux City Municipal Airport.
California	Los Angeles, Long Beach, Fresno	October 31–November 1	Stayed at the Century Plaza Hotel, where he attended a Republican reception. Visited former president Richard Nixon, who was suffering from phlebitis, at Long Beach Memorial Medical Center. Campaigned for Representative Bob Mathias at Fresno Air Terminal.

== November ==
State or country	Areas visited	Dates	Details
Oregon	Portland	November 1–2	Attended the White House Conference on Domestic and Economic Affairs at Portland Memorial Coliseum. Attended a Republican reception at the Benson Hotel. Visited an Oregon Museum of Science and Industry charity auction, and attended a Portland Trail Blazers–Buffalo Braves basketball game, at Memorial Coliseum. Attended a Portland Urban League dance at the Masonic Temple. Stayed at the Benson Hotel.
Utah	Salt Lake City	November 2	Toured the Columbus Community Center. Spoke at the University of Utah's Special Events Center.
Colorado	Grand Junction	November 2	Campaigned for Senator Peter H. Dominick at Lincoln Park. Toured the Veterans Administration Hospital.
Kansas	Wichita	November 2	Attended a Republican reception at the Century II Performing Arts & Convention Center.
Nevada	Las Vegas	November 14	Addressed the National Association of Realtors convention at the Las Vegas Hilton.
Arizona	Phoenix	November 14	Accepted delivery of the first McDonnell Douglas F-15 Eagle at Luke Air Force Base. Rested at the Camelback Inn. Addressed the Society of Professional Journalists, Sigma Delta Chi convention at Del Webb's Town House.
Alaska	Anchorage	November 17	Stopover at Elmendorf Air Force Base en route to Japan.
Japan	Tokyo, Kyoto	November 18–22	State visit. Met with Prime Minister Kakuei Tanaka.
South Korea	Seoul	November 22–23	Met with President Park Chung Hee.
Soviet Union	Vladivostok	November 23–24	Met with General Secretary Leonid Brezhnev and discussed limitations of strategic arms.

== December ==
State or country	Areas visited	Dates	Details
New York	New York	December 10	Presented the National Football Foundation Distinguished American Award to Bob Hope in a ceremony at the Waldorf Astoria New York.
France	Fort-de-France, Martinique	December 14–16	Met with President Valéry Giscard d'Estaing.
Colorado	Vail	December 22–31	Christmas vacation at the home of Richard Bass.
