= List of presidential trips made by Jimmy Carter (1977) =

Wikimedia list article

This is a list of presidential trips made by Jimmy Carter during 1977, the first year of his presidency as the 39th president of the United States. International trips are highlighted in blue.

This list excludes trips made within Washington, D.C., the U.S. federal capital in which the White House, the official residence and principal workplace of the president, is located. It also excludes the capital's immediate surroundings in Maryland and Virginia, such as Andrews Air Force Base in Maryland, where the president typically boards Air Force One for all trips outside the area. Also excluded are trips to Camp David, the country residence of the president, and to Carter's house in Plains, Georgia.

== January ==
State or country	Areas visited	Dates	Details
Pennsylvania	East Pittsburgh	January 30	Discussed the energy crisis with workers at the Westinghouse plant.

== February ==
No trips made

== March ==
State or country	Areas visited	Dates	Details
Massachusetts	Boxboro, Clinton	March 16–17	Rested at the Sheraton Inn in Boxboro. Held a townhall meeting at Clinton Town Hall. Stayed overnight at the home of a local resident in Clinton.
West Virginia	Charleston	March 17	Ate lunch in the basement cafeteria of the West Virginia State Capitol. Participated in a roundtable discussion on energy and the environment at the Charleston Coliseum & Convention Center. Visited the West Virginia Governor's Mansion.
New York	New York	March 17	Addressed the United Nations General Assembly.

== April ==
State or country	Areas visited	Dates	Details
Georgia	Calhoun	April 8–10	Visited his son, Jack Carter.

== May ==
State or country	Areas visited	Dates	Details
United Kingdom	London, Newcastle	May 5–11	Attended the 3rd G7 summit. Also met with the prime ministers of Greece, Belgium, Turkey, Norway, the Netherlands and Luxembourg, and with the President of Portugal. Addressed NATO Ministers meeting.
Switzerland	Geneva	May 9	Official visit. Met with President Kurt Furgler. Also met with Syrian President Hafez al-Assad.
California	Los Angeles, Reedley	May 17	Addressed the United Auto Workers convention at the Los Angeles Convention Center. Took questions from local residents in a live broadcast from KNXT-TV studios. Toured a local farm in Reedley affected by the 1976–77 California drought.
Indiana	South Bend	May 22	Gave the commencement address at the University of Notre Dame.
Georgia	St. Simons Island	May 26–31	Vacationed at Musgrove Plantation.
Florida	Cape Canaveral	May 27	Toured the submarine USS Los Angeles off the coast of Port Canaveral.

== June ==
State or country	Areas visited	Dates	Details
New York	New York	June 23	Attended a Democratic fundraiser at the Waldorf Astoria New York.

== July ==
State or country	Areas visited	Dates	Details
South Carolina	Charleston	July 21	Addressed the Southern Legislative Conference at the Gaillard Municipal Auditorium.
Mississippi	Jackson, Yazoo City	July 21–22	Attended a reception at the Coliseum Ramada Inn in Jackson. Held a townhall meeting at Yazoo City High School. Stayed at the home of a local Yazoo City resident.
Louisiana	New Orleans	July 22	Visited an offshore oil platform, the Zapata Yorktown. Spoke at the Airport Hilton.

== August ==
No trips made

== September ==
State or country	Areas visited	Dates	Details
New Jersey	Newark, Trenton	September 10	Attended fundraisers for Governor Brendan Byrne at Newark International Airport and at the College of Medicine and Dentistry of New Jersey. Spoke at the Festival of Lights in the Chambersburg neighborhood.
Virginia	Roanoke, Norfolk, Williamsburg	September 24	Campaigned for Henry Howell for governor and other statewide Democratic candidates at Roanoke Civic Center, Norfolk Botanical Garden, and the Williamsburg Convention Center.

== October ==
State or country	Areas visited	Dates	Details
New York	New York	October 4–5	Addressed the opening session of the 32nd United Nations General Assembly. Stayed at the UN Plaza Hotel. Toured an urban rehabilitation project in the South Bronx. Signed the International Covenants on Human Rights at United Nations Headquarters.
Michigan	Detroit	October 21	Participated in a Community Services Administration public policy forum on urban poverty at the Veterans Memorial Building.
Iowa	Des Moines, Indianola	October 21	Rested at the Des Moines Airport Hilton. Attended a reception at the National Motor Inn in Des Moines. Attended the Iowa Democratic Party's Jefferson-Jackson Day Dinner at Veterans Memorial Auditorium. Stayed overnight on a local farm in Indianola.
Nebraska	Omaha	October 22	Toured Strategic Air Command headquarters at Offutt Air Force Base.
Colorado	Denver	October 22	Participated in a roundtable discussion on water policy in the Western United States, and met with governors of Western states, at the Denver Hilton.
California	Los Angeles	October 22–23	Attended a Democratic fundraiser at the Century Plaza Hotel, where he stayed overnight.
Minnesota	Minneapolis	October 23	At Minneapolis–Saint Paul International Airport, met with former vice president Hubert Humphrey, who then flew back to Washington with Carter for a ceremony renaming the South Portal Building to the Hubert H. Humphrey Building.

== November ==
No trips made

== December ==
State or country	Areas visited	Dates	Details
Poland	Warsaw	December 29–31	Official visit. Met with First Secretary Edward Gierek. The visit garnered notoriety among Poles in subsequent years due to Carter's goodwill speech, which was mistranslated as a series of incoherent and anti-Polish remarks.
Iran	Tehran	December 31	Official visit. Met with Shah Mohammad Reza Pahlavi and King Hussein of Jordan. Carter gave his "Island of Stability" speech during this visit.
