= List of United States presidential visits to Central America =

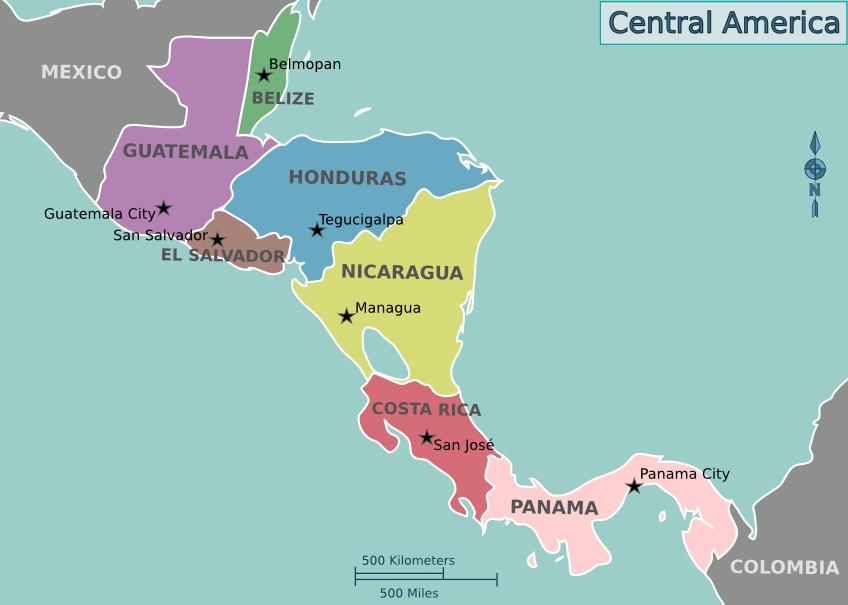
The countries of Central America and their capital cities

Eleven United States presidents and three presidents-elect have made thirty-four presidential visits to Central America. The first visit by an incumbent president to a country in Central America was made in 1906 by Theodore Roosevelt. The trip, to Panama, was the first international presidential trip in U.S. history, and signaled the start of a new era in how presidents conducted diplomatic relations with other countries. In 1928, Herbert Hoover, during the time when he was president-elect, visited the region during his historic "good will" trip, to Central and South America.

The number of visits made to each country in the region are: 12 to Panama, seven to Costa Rica, five to El Salvador, four to Honduras, three to Guatemala, and three to Nicaragua. Only Belize has not been visited by an American president.

== Table of visits ==
President	Dates	Country	Locations	Key details
Theodore Roosevelt	November 14–17, 1906	Panama	Colón, Panama City	Inspected Panama Canal construction.
William H. Taft	January 29 – February 7, 1909	Panama	Colón, Panama City	Inspected Panama Canal construction and met with President José Domingo de Obaldía. (Visit made as President-elect.)
Warren G. Harding	November 24, 1920	Panama	Colón, Baihos	Informal tour of Panama Canal. (Visit made as President-elect.)
Herbert Hoover	November 26, 1928	Honduras	Amapala	Met with President-elect Vicente Mejía Colindres and Foreign Minister Augusto Coello. (Visit made as President-elect.)
Herbert Hoover	November 26, 1928	El Salvador	Cutuco	Met with Minister of Foreign Affairs Francisco Martínez Suárez. (Visit made as President-elect.)
Herbert Hoover	November 27, 1928	Nicaragua	Corinto	Met with President Adolfo Díaz and President-elect José María Moncada. (Visit made as President-elect.)
Herbert Hoover	November 28, 1928	Costa Rica	San José	Met with President Cleto González Víquez. (Visit made as President-elect.)
Franklin D. Roosevelt	July 11–12, 1934	Panama	Panama City	Informal visit.
Franklin D. Roosevelt	October 16, 1935	Panama	Balboa	Informal visit with President Harmodio Arias Madrid.
Franklin D. Roosevelt	August 4–5, 1938	Panama	Balboa	Informal visit with President Juan Demóstenes Arosemena.
Franklin D. Roosevelt	February 27, 1940	Panama	Cristóbal, Balboa	Met informally with President Augusto Samuel Boyd.
Dwight D. Eisenhower	July 21–23, 1956	Panama	Panama City	Attended a meeting of the Presidents of the American Republics.
John F. Kennedy	March 18–20, 1963	Costa Rica	San Jose	Attended Conference of Presidents of the Central American Republics.
Lyndon B. Johnson	July 8, 1968	El Salvador	San Salvador	Attended meeting of the Presidents of Central American Republics.
Lyndon B. Johnson	July 8, 1968	Nicaragua	Managua	Informal visit; met with President Anastasio Somoza Debayle.
Lyndon B. Johnson	July 8, 1968	Costa Rica	San José	Informal visit; met with President José Joaquín Trejos Fernández.
Lyndon B. Johnson	July 8, 1968	Honduras	San Pedro Sula	Informal visit; met with President Oswaldo López Arellano.
Lyndon B. Johnson	July 8, 1968	Guatemala	Guatemala City	Informal visit; met with President Julio César Méndez Montenegro.
Jimmy Carter	June 16–17, 1978	Panama	Panama City	Invited by President Demetrio B. Lakas and General Omar Torrijos to sign protocol confirming exchange of documents ratifying the Panama Canal treaties. Also met informally with Presidents Carlos Andrés Pérez of Venezuela, Alfonso López Michelsen of Colombia, José López Portillo of Mexico, Rodrigo Carazo Odio of Costa Rica, and Prime Minister Michael Manley of Jamaica.
Ronald Reagan	December 3–4, 1982	Costa Rica	San José	Official working visit; met with President Luis Alberto Monge and President Álvaro Magaña of El Salvador.
Ronald Reagan	December 4, 1982	Honduras	San Pedro Sula	Official working visit; met with President Roberto Suazo Córdova and with Guatemalan President Efraín Ríos Montt.
George H. W. Bush	October 27–28, 1989	Costa Rica	San José	Attended Hemispheric Summit Meeting.
George H. W. Bush	June 11, 1992	Panama	Panama City	Met with President Guillermo Endara and delivered public addresses.
Bill Clinton	May 7–9, 1997	Costa Rica	San José	Attended a Summit Meeting of Presidents of the Central American Republics.
Bill Clinton	March 8, 1999	Nicaragua	Managua, Posoltega, El Porvenir	Discussed reconstruction aid with President Arnoldo Alemán and visited the El Porvenir Maya city site.
Bill Clinton	March 8–9, 1999	Honduras	Soto Cano Air Base, Tegucigalpa	Discussed reconstruction aid with President Carlos Roberto Flores; addressed U.S. military personnel.
Bill Clinton	March 10, 1999	El Salvador	San Salvador	Met with President Armando Calderón Sol and Addressed the Legislative Assembly of El Salvador.
Bill Clinton	March 10–11, 1999	Guatemala	Guatemala City, Antigua	Attended Central American Summit meeting with leaders of seven Central American and Caribbean nations.
George W. Bush	March 24, 2002	El Salvador	San Salvador	Attended a summit meeting with Central American heads of state.
George W. Bush	November 6–7, 2005	Panama	Panama City	Met with President Martín Torrijos.
George W. Bush	March 11–12, 2007	Guatemala	Guatemala City, Santa Cruz del Quiché, Santa Cruz Balanyá, Iximche	Informal visit; met with President Óscar Berger. Visited Iximche archaeological site.
Barack Obama	March 22–23, 2011	El Salvador	San Salvador	Met with President Mauricio Funes.
Barack Obama	May 3–4, 2013	Costa Rica	San José	Met with President Laura Chinchilla and leaders of the Central American Integration System.
Barack Obama	April 10–11, 2015	Panama	Panama City	Attended the 7th Summit of the Americas.

== See also ==
- Latin America–United States relations
- Foreign relations of the United States
