= List of presidential trips made by Ronald Reagan (1981) =

Wikimedia list article

This is a list of presidential trips made by Ronald Reagan during 1981, the first year of his presidency as the 40th president of the United States. International trips are highlighted in blue.

This list excludes trips made within Washington, D.C., the U.S. federal capital in which the White House, the official residence and principal workplace of the president, is located. It also excludes the capital's immediate surroundings in Maryland and Virginia, such as Andrews Air Force Base in Maryland, where the president typically boards Air Force One for all trips outside the area. Also excluded are trips to Camp David, the country residence of the president, and to Reagan's Rancho del Cielo ranch in Santa Barbara County, California.

== January ==
No trips made

== February ==
No trips made

== March ==
State or country	Areas visited	Dates	Details
Canada	Ottawa	March 10–11	State visit. Met with Governor General Edward Schreyer and Prime Minister Pierre Trudeau. Addressed parliament.
New York	New York	March 13–15	Stayed at the Waldorf Astoria New York. Sat down for an interview at the New York Daily News building. Announced that the federal government would support the Westway highway project. Attended a luncheon at Angelo's on Mulberry Street with Senator Al D'Amato and Representative Guy Molinari. Attended a performance of Sugar Babies at the Mark Hellinger Theatre. Dined at Le Cirque. Attended a performance of the Joffrey Ballet at Lincoln Center.

== April ==
No trips made

== May ==
No trips made

== June ==
State or country	Areas visited	Dates	Details
Texas	San Antonio	June 24	Addressed the Jaycees convention at the Henry B. González Convention Center. This was Reagan's first trip outside Washington after surviving an attempted assassination on March 30.
California	Los Angeles	June 24–26	Stayed at the Century Plaza Hotel, where he addressed the California Taxpayers Association luncheon.
Colorado	Denver	June 29	Addressed the National Association for the Advancement of Colored People convention at Currigan Hall.

== July ==
State or country	Areas visited	Dates	Details
Illinois	Chicago	July 7	Attended a fundraiser for Governor Jim Thompson at McCormick Place.
Canada	Ottawa, Montebello	July 19–21	Attended the 7th G7 summit.
Georgia	Atlanta	July 30	Addressed the National Conference of State Legislatures convention at the Atlanta Hilton, where he also attended a Republican fundraiser.

== August ==
State or country	Areas visited	Dates	Details
California	Los Angeles, Costa Mesa	August 17–22	Stayed at the Century Plaza Hotel, where he attended a "Target '82" Republican fundraiser. Participated in a re-enlistment ceremony aboard the USS Constellation while it was off the coast of California. Attended a Republican fundraiser at the South Coast Plaza Hotel. Dined at Chasen's. Visited the home of Justin Whitlock Dart Sr.
California	Santa Barbara	August 27	Hosted a reception for White House correspondents at the Santa Barbara Biltmore. Attended a Republican fundraiser at two private residences.
California	Los Angeles	August 30–September 2	Stayed at the Century Plaza Hotel.

== September ==
State or country	Areas visited	Dates	Details
Illinois	Chicago	September 2–3	Addressed the Illinois Forum at the Palmer House Hotel, where he stayed overnight. Addressed the United Brotherhood of Carpenters and Joiners of America 100th anniversary convention at McCormick Place.
New York	New York	September 7	Presented a check funding the Westway project to Mayor Ed Koch at Gracie Mansion.
Michigan	Grand Rapids	September 17–18	Stayed at the Amway Grand Hotel, where he attended a Bob Hope Gala in honor of former president Gerald Ford. Attended the dedication ceremony of the Gerald R. Ford Presidential Museum.
Colorado	Denver	September 18	Addressed the National Federation of Republican Women convention at Currigan Hall.
Louisiana	New Orleans	September 28	Addressed the International Association of Chiefs of Police convention at the Rivergate Convention Center. Attended a Republican fundraiser at the World Trade Center New Orleans.

== October ==
State or country	Areas visited	Dates	Details
Pennsylvania	Philadelphia	October 15	Addressed a World Affairs Council of Philadelphia luncheon at The Bellevue-Stratford Hotel.
New Jersey	Whippany	October 15	Attended a Republican fundraiser at Birchwood Manor.
Virginia	Yorktown, Williamsburg	October 18–19	Attended celebrations of the 200th anniversary of the British surrender at Yorktown which ended the American Revolutionary War. Met French president François Mitterrand at Coast Guard Training Center Yorktown, where he was brought aboard the French frigate De Grasse. The two presidents then visited Colonial Williamsburg together, alongside British Lord Chancellor Quintin Hogg, Baron Hailsham of Saint Marylebone. Stayed overnight at Lightfoot House, then toured Naval Weapons Station Yorktown with Mitterrand.
Mexico	Cancun	October 21–24	Attended the North–South Summit on International Cooperation and Development. Met with the heads of state and government of Algeria, Bangladesh, Canada, China, France, Guyana, India, Japan, Mexico, Nigeria, the Philippines, Saudi Arabia, Sweden, Tanzania, the United Kingdom, Venezuela and Yugoslavia.
Virginia	Richmond	October 27	Campaigned for Virginia attorney general Marshall Coleman for governor at the Hotel John Marshall.

== November ==
State or country	Areas visited	Dates	Details
New York	New York	November 6	Attended a Republican fundraiser at the Waldorf Astoria. Addressed the American Irish Historical Society dinner at the Seventh Regiment Armory.
Texas	Houston, Sabinal	November 13–14	Visited Johnson Space Center, where he called the astronauts aboard Space Shuttle test flight STS-2. Attended a "Salute to a Stronger America" Republican fundraiser at the Hyatt Regency Houston Downtown, where he stayed overnight. Went turkey shooting with his chief of staff James Baker on a ranch in Sabinal belonging to Baker's father-in-law.
Ohio	Cincinnati	November 30	Attended a Republican fundraiser at the Westin hotel.

== December ==
State or country	Areas visited	Dates	Details
California	Los Angeles, Palm Springs	December 27–31	Stayed at the Century Plaza Hotel and at Sunnylands.
