= List of United States presidential visits to the Caribbean =

Nine United States presidents and one president-elect have made presidential visits to the Caribbean since 1928. Franklin D. Roosevelt made the most trips to the Caribbean islands (14), either for vacation or while involved with Allied diplomatic interactions during World War II. Of the 13 sovereign countries in the region, four—Dominica, the Dominican Republic, Saint Kitts and Nevis, and Saint Vincent and the Grenadines—have not as of yet been visited by an American president.

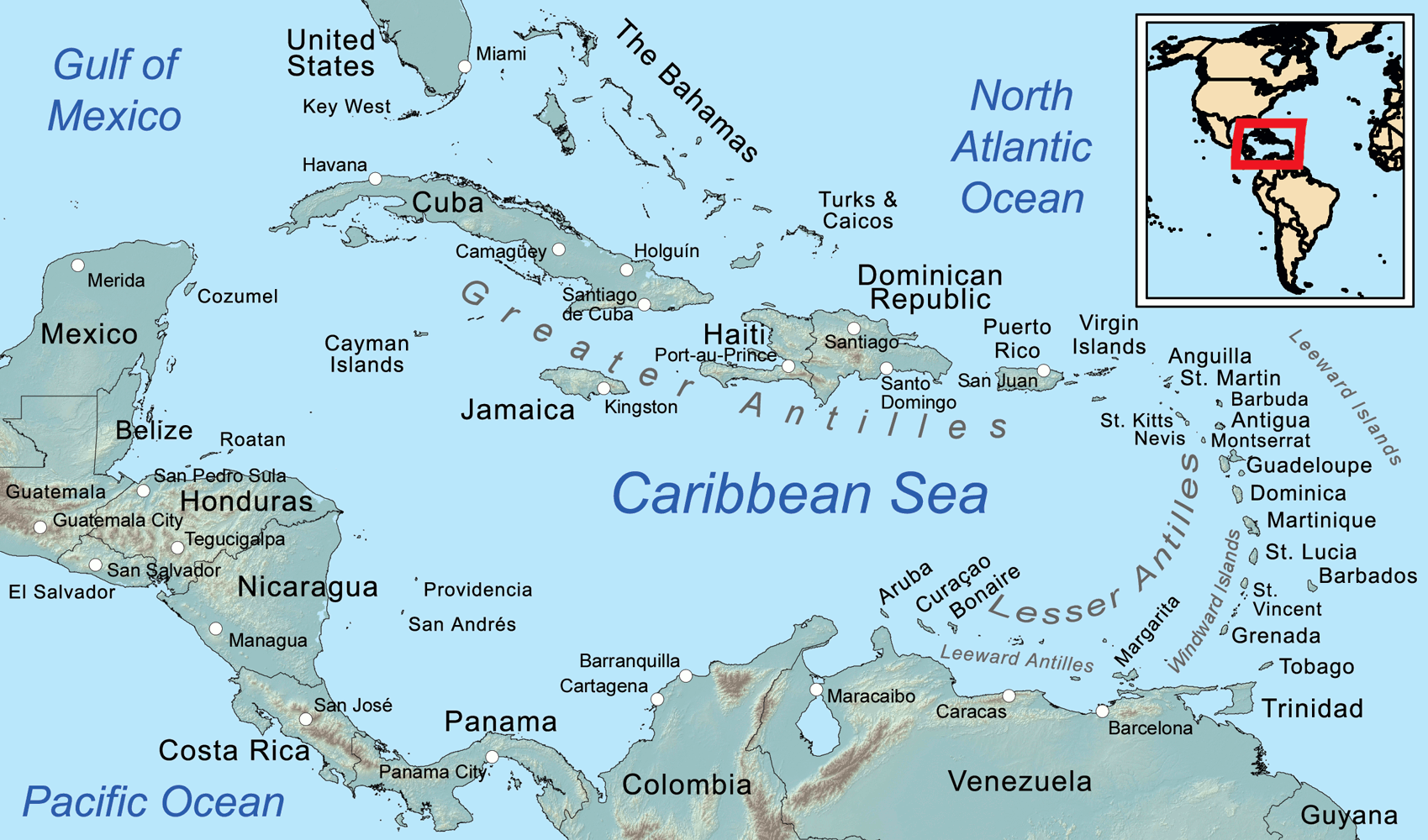
Islands in and near the Caribbean Sea.

== Table of visits ==
Note: This table does not include presidential visits to places that are part of the United States.

| President | Dates | Country or territory | Locations | Key details |
|---|---|---|---|---|
| Warren G. Harding | November 30, 1920 | Jamaica | Kingston | Stopped while returning to the U.S. from Panama. (Visit made as President-elect.) |
| Calvin Coolidge | January 15–17, 1928 | Cuba | Havana | Met with President Gerardo Machado. Addressed the Sixth International Conference of American States. |
| Franklin D. Roosevelt | February 6–14, 1933 | Bahamas | | Fishing trip. (Visit made as President-elect.) |
| Franklin D. Roosevelt | March 29 – April 11, 1934 | Bahamas | Elbow Cay, Gun Cay | Fishing trip. |
| Franklin D. Roosevelt | July 5–6, 1934 | Haiti | Cap-Haïtien | Informal visit en route to vacation in Hawaii. |
| Franklin D. Roosevelt | March 27 – April 6, 1935 | Bahamas | Cat Cays, Lobos Cay, Great Inagua Island, Crooked Island | Fishing trip. |
| Franklin D. Roosevelt | March 24 – April 7, 1936 | Bahamas | Nassau, Great Inagua Island | Fishing trip. Luncheon with Governor Bede Clifford and the President of the Legislative Council, George Johnson. |
| Franklin D. Roosevelt | November 21, 1936 | Trinidad and Tobago | Port of Spain | Stopped on the way to South America. |
| Franklin D. Roosevelt | December 11, 1936 | Trinidad and Tobago | Port of Spain | Stopped while returning to the United States. |
| Franklin D. Roosevelt | December 5, 1940 | Jamaica | Kingston | Inspected British base sites for possible American use. |
| Franklin D. Roosevelt | December 8, 1940 | Saint Lucia | | Inspected British base sites for possible American use. |
| Franklin D. Roosevelt | December 8, 1940 | (France) Martinique | Fort Saint Louis | Conferred with U.S. officials. |
| Franklin D. Roosevelt | December 9, 1940 | British Leeward Islands | Antigua | Inspected British base sites for possible American use. |
| Franklin D. Roosevelt | December 12–13, 1940 | Bahamas | Eleuthera Island | Inspected British base sites for possible American use. Met with the Governor, H.R.H. the Duke of Windsor. |
| Franklin D. Roosevelt | January 11, 1943 | Trinidad and Tobago | Port of Spain | Overnight stop en route to Casablanca. |
| Franklin D. Roosevelt | January 29, 1943 | Trinidad and Tobago | Port of Spain | Overnight stop en route home from the Casablanca Conference. |
| John F. Kennedy | December 18–21, 1962 | Bahamas | Nassau | Conferred with British Prime Minister Harold Macmillan. Concluded Nassau Agreement on nuclear defense systems. |
| Gerald Ford | December 14–16, 1974 | (France) Martinique | Fort-de-France | Met with President Valéry Giscard d'Estaing |
| Jimmy Carter | January 4–9, 1979 | (France) Guadeloupe | Basse-Terre | Met informally with President Valéry Giscard d'Estaing, German Chancellor Helmut Schmidt and British Prime Minister James Callaghan. |
| Ronald Reagan | April 7–8, 1982 | Jamaica | Kingston | Official Visit. Met with Prime Minister Edward Seaga. |
| Ronald Reagan | April 8–11, 1982 | Barbados | Bridgetown | Official Visit. Met with the Prime Ministers of Barbados, Dominica, Antigua and Barbuda, St. Christopher and Nevis, and St. Vincent and the Grenadines. |
| Ronald Reagan | February 20, 1986 | Grenada | St. George's | Met with Governor General Paul Scoon and Prime Minister Herbert Blaize, and with the Prime Ministers of Barbados, Dominica, Jamaica, St. Lucia, St. Christopher and Nevis, St. Vincent and the Grenadines, Antigua and Barbuda, and Trinidad and Tobago. Dedicated a memorial to U.S. servicemen. |
| George H. W. Bush | December 16, 1989 | (France) Saint Martin | Marigot | Informal meeting with President François Mitterrand. |
| George H. W. Bush | March 14, 1991 | (France) Martinique | Fort-de-France | Discussed the Middle East peace process with President François Mitterrand. |
| Bill Clinton | March 31, 1995 | Haiti | Port-au-Prince | Attended transition ceremony for United Nations Mission in Haiti. |
| Bill Clinton | May 9–11, 1997 | Barbados | Bridgetown | Attended the U.S.-Caribbean Community summit meeting. Signed the Partnership for Prosperity and Security in the Caribbean pact. |
| Barack Obama | April 17–18, 2009 | Trinidad and Tobago | Port of Spain | Attended the 5th Summit of the Americas. |
| Barack Obama | April 9–10, 2015 | Jamaica | Kingston | Met with Prime Minister Portia Simpson-Miller. Visited the Bob Marley Museum. Attended a town hall meeting at the University of the West Indies. Laid wreath at the National Heroes Park. |
| Barack Obama | March 20–22, 2016 | Cuba | Havana | Official visit. Met with President Raúl Castro. Laid a wreath at the José Martí Memorial. Addressed Cuban civil society organizations at the Gran Teatro de La Habana. Toured Old Havana and visited the Havana Cathedral. Attended an exhibition baseball game between the Cuba national baseball team and the Tampa Bay Rays. |

== See also ==
- Bahamas–United States relations
- Cuba–United States relations
- Haiti–United States relations
- Dominican Republic–United States relations
- Jamaica–United States relations
- Antigua and Barbuda–United States relations
- Saint Kitts and Nevis–United States relations
- Dominica–United States relations
- Saint Lucia–United States relations
- Saint Vincent and the Grenadines–United States relations
- Grenada–United States relations
- Barbados–United States relations
- Trinidad and Tobago–United States relations
