= List of United States presidential visits to Eastern Europe and Northern Asia =

Ten United States presidents have made presidential visits to Eastern Europe and Northern Asia. The first trip by an incumbent president to Eastern Europe was made by Franklin D. Roosevelt in 1945, to the Soviet Union, and was an offshoot of Allied diplomatic interactions during World War II. The first trip by an incumbent president to Northern Asia was made by Gerald Ford in 1974, also to the Soviet Union, and was an offshoot of U.S.–Soviet Détente during the Cold War. The first presidential visits to other Eastern European countries occurred during this era of easing geo-political tensions as well.

As of February 2023, 15 visits have been made to Russia (which is partially in Eastern Europe as well as the only country in Northern Asia), 16 to Poland, five to the Czech Republic, five to Romania, five to Ukraine, four to Hungary, two to Bulgaria, one to Belarus, and one to Slovakia. Additionally, six visits were made to the Soviet Union prior to its collapse. One visit was also made to Czechoslovakia prior to its dissolution. Moldova is the only Eastern European country which has not been visited by a sitting American president.

== Table of visits ==
| President | Dates | Countries | Locations | Key events |
|---|---|---|---|---|
| Franklin D. Roosevelt | February 3–5, 1945 | Soviet Union | Yalta | Attended the Yalta Conference with Soviet Premier Joseph Stalin and British Prime Minister Winston Churchill. |
| Richard Nixon | August 2–3, 1969 | Romania | Bucharest | Official Visit. Met with General Secretary Nicolae Ceaușescu. |
| Richard Nixon | May 22–30, 1972 | Soviet Union | Moscow, Leningrad, Kyiv (Kiev) | State Visit. Met with Premier Alexei Kosygin and General Secretary Leonid Brezhnev. Signing of the Anti-Ballistic Missile (ABM) Treaty, the first Strategic Arms Limitation Treaty (SALT I), and the U.S.–Soviet Incidents at Sea Agreement. |
| Richard Nixon | May 31 – June 1, 1972 | Poland | Warsaw | Official visit. Met with First Secretary Edward Gierek. |
| Richard Nixon | June 27 – July 3, 1974 | Soviet Union | Moscow, Minsk, Oreanda | Official Visit. Met with General Secretary Leonid Brezhnev, President Nikolai Podgorny and Premier Alexei Kosygin. Signing of the Threshold Test Ban Treaty. |
| Gerald Ford | November 23–24, 1974 | Soviet Union | Vladivostok | Met with General Secretary Leonid Brezhnev and discussed limitations of strategic arms. |
| Gerald Ford | July 28–29, 1975 | Poland | Warsaw, Kraków | Official visit. Met with First Secretary Edward Gierek. |
| Gerald Ford | August 2–3, 1975 | Romania | Bucharest, Sinaia | Official Visit. Met with President Nicolae Ceaușescu. |
| Jimmy Carter | December 29–31, 1977 | Poland | Warsaw | Official visit. Met with First Secretary Edward Gierek. |
| Ronald Reagan | May 29 – June 2, 1988 | Soviet Union | Moscow | Met with General Secretary Mikhail Gorbachev. Exchanged ratifications of the INF Treaty. |
| George H. W. Bush | July 9–11, 1989 | Poland | Warsaw, Gdańsk | Met with government and Solidarity leaders. Addressed the National Assembly. |
| George H. W. Bush | July 11–13, 1989 | Hungary | Budapest | Met with Hungarian officials. Delivered an address at Karl Marx University. |
| George H. W. Bush | November 17, 1990 | Czechoslovakia | Prague | Attended ceremonies commemorating the first anniversary of the Velvet Revolution. Addressed the Federal Assembly. |
| George H. W. Bush | July 29 – August 1, 1991 | Soviet Union | Moscow, Kyiv | Summit Meeting. Signed Strategic Arms Reduction Treaty (START I). Addressed the Ukrainian Parliament. |
| George H. W. Bush | July 5, 1992 | Poland | Warsaw | Met with President Lech Wałęsa. Attended a memorial service for former Prime Minister Ignacy Jan Paderewski. |
| George H. W. Bush | January 2–3, 1993 | Russia | Moscow | Signed the START II Treaty. |
| Bill Clinton | January 11–12, 1994 | Czech Republic | Prague | Met with the Presidents and Prime Ministers of the Czech Republic, Hungary, Poland and Slovakia. |
| Bill Clinton | January 12, 1994 | Ukraine | Kyiv | Met with President Leonid Kravchuk. |
| Bill Clinton | January 12–15, 1994 | Russia | Moscow | Met with President Boris Yeltsin and senior Russian officials. Signed nuclear disarmament agreement with Ukraine. |
| Bill Clinton | January 15, 1994 | Belarus | Minsk | Met with Chairman Stanislav Shushkevich. |
| Bill Clinton | July 6–7, 1994 | Poland | Warsaw | Addressed the Polish Parliament. Attended ceremonies commemorating the Warsaw Ghetto Uprising. |
| Bill Clinton | December 5, 1994 | Hungary | Budapest | Attended CSCE Summit Meeting. |
| Bill Clinton | May 9–11, 1995 | Russia | Moscow | Summit meeting. Attended the 50th anniversary of VE Day ceremonies. |
| Bill Clinton | May 11–12, 1995 | Ukraine | Kyiv | State visit. Met with President Leonid Kuchma. |
| Bill Clinton | January 13, 1996 | Hungary | Taszár | Met with U.S. Armed Forces personnel. |
| Bill Clinton | April 18–21, 1996 | Russia | Saint Petersburg, Moscow | Attended the G-7 summit on nuclear safety. Summit Meeting with President Boris Yeltsin. |
| Bill Clinton | July 10–11, 1997 | Poland | Warsaw | Met with President Aleksander Kwaśniewski and former President Lech Wałęsa. |
| Bill Clinton | July 11, 1997 | Romania | Bucharest | Met with President Emil Constantinescu and Romanian political leaders. |
| Bill Clinton | September 1–3, 1998 | Russia | Moscow | Summit meeting with President Boris Yeltsin. |
| Bill Clinton | November 21–23, 1999 | Bulgaria | Sofia | Met with President Petar Stoyanov and Prime Minister Ivan Kostov. |
| Bill Clinton | June 3–5, 2000 | Russia | Moscow | Summit meeting with President Vladimir Putin. Addressed the State Duma. |
| Bill Clinton | June 5, 2000 | Ukraine | Kyiv | Met with President Leonid Kuchma. |
| George W. Bush | June 15–16, 2001 | Poland | Warsaw | State visit. Met with President Aleksander Kwaśniewski and Prime Minister Jerzy Buzek. |
| George W. Bush | May 23–26, 2002 | Russia | Moscow, Saint Petersburg | Summit meeting with President Vladimir Putin. Signed Strategic Offensive Reductions Treaty. |
| George W. Bush | November 19–22, 2002 | Czech Republic | Prague | Attended the NATO and EAPC summit meetings. |
| George W. Bush | November 22, 2002 | Russia | St. Petersburg | Met with President Vladimir Putin. |
| George W. Bush | November 23, 2002 | Romania | Bucharest | Met with President Ion Iliescu. |
| George W. Bush | May 31, 2003 | Poland | Kraków, Oświęcim | Met with President Aleksander Kwaśniewski and Prime Minister Leszek Miller. Visited Nazi-German Auschwitz concentration camp. |
| George W. Bush | May 31 – June 1, 2003 | Russia | St. Petersburg | Met with President Vladimir Putin. Attended ceremonies commemorating the city's 300th anniversary. |
| George W. Bush | February 23–24, 2005 | Slovakia | Bratislava | Attended the summit meeting with Russian President Vladimir Putin. Also met with Prime Minister Mikuláš Dzurinda. |
| George W. Bush | May 8–9, 2005 | Russia | Moscow | Met with President Vladimir Putin. Attended the 60th anniversary of VE Day ceremonies. |
| George W. Bush | June 21–22, 2006 | Hungary | Budapest | Met with President László Sólyom and Prime Minister Ferenc Gyurcsány. Attended the 50th anniversary of the Hungarian Uprising. |
| George W. Bush | July 14–17, 2006 | Russia | St. Petersburg | Attended the 32nd G8 summit. Met with Chinese President Hu Jintao, Brazilian President Luiz Inácio Lula da Silva and Indian Prime Minister Manmohan Singh. |
| George W. Bush | November 15, 2006 | Russia | Moscow | Met with President Vladimir Putin. |
| George W. Bush | June 4–5, 2007 | Czech Republic | Prague | Met with President Václav Klaus and Prime Minister Mirek Topolánek. Addressed Conference on Democracy and Security. |
| George W. Bush | June 8, 2007 | Poland | Gdańsk, Jurata | Met with President Lech Kaczyński. |
| George W. Bush | June 10–11, 2007 | Bulgaria | Sofia | Met with President Georgi Parvanov and Prime Minister Sergei Stanishev. |
| George W. Bush | April 1, 2008 | Ukraine | Kyiv | Met with President Viktor Yushchenko and Prime Minister Yulia Tymoshenko. |
| George W. Bush | April 2–4, 2008 | Romania | Bucharest | Attended the NATO Summit Meeting. |
| George W. Bush | April 5–6, 2008 | Russia | Sochi | Met with President Vladimir Putin and President-elect Dmitry Medvedev. |
| Barack Obama | April 4–5, 2009 | Czech Republic | Prague | Attended the U.S.-EU Summit Meeting. Met with Prime Minister Mirek Topolánek and President Václav Klaus. Delivered public speech on nuclear disarmament in Hradčany Square. |
| Barack Obama | July 6–9, 2009 | Russia | Moscow | Met with President Dmitry Medvedev and Prime Minister Vladimir Putin. Delivered a commencement speech to the New Economic School. |
| Barack Obama | April 8, 2010 | Czech Republic | Prague | Signed the Strategic Arms Reduction Treaty with Russia. Also met with the Presidents of the Czech Republic, Estonia, Latvia, and Romania; and with the Prime Ministers of Bulgaria, Croatia, the Czech Republic, Hungary, Lithuania, Poland, Slovakia, and Slovenia. |
| Barack Obama | May 27–28, 2011 | Poland | Warsaw | Met with President Bronisław Komorowski and Prime Minister Donald Tusk. Laid wreath at the Warsaw Ghetto Memorial. Visited the memorial to the victims of the Smolensk plane crash. |
| Barack Obama | September 4–6, 2013 | Russia | Saint Petersburg | Attended the G-20 Summit Meeting. |
| Barack Obama | June 3–4, 2014 | Poland | Warsaw | Met with President Bronisław Komorowski and Prime Minister Donald Tusk. Attended a Solidarity Dinner and a Freedom Day commemoration marking the 25th anniversary of democracy in Poland. |
| Barack Obama | July 8–9, 2016 | Poland | Warsaw | Attended the NATO summit meeting. Met with President Andrzej Duda, European Council President (and former Polish Prime Minister) Donald Tusk, and European Commission President Jean-Claude Juncker to discuss counterterrorism, and the Syrian refugee crisis. |
| Donald Trump | July 5–6, 2017 | Poland | Warsaw | Met with President Andrzej Duda, President of the Republic of Croatia Kolinda Grabar-Kitarović, and with the other Eastern European countries' leaders during the summit of Three Seas Initiative. Laid wreath at the Warsaw Uprising Monument and delivered a speech. |
| Joe Biden | March 25–26, 2022 | Poland | Warsaw | Met with President Andrzej Duda and Prime Minister Mateusz Morawiecki. Met Ukrainian refugees where he delivered a speech. |
| Joe Biden | February 20–22, 2023 | Poland | Rzeszów, Przemyśl, Warsaw | President Biden flew to Rzeszow, then transferred to Przemysl and via train went to Kyiv, in Ukraine. After returning to Poland, he met with President Andrzej Duda and attended the Bucharest Nine (B9) where he delivered a speech marking the first anniversary of the Russian invasion of Ukraine. |
| Joe Biden | February 20, 2023 | Ukraine | Kyiv | Met with President Volodymyr Zelenskyy ahead of the first anniversary of the Russian invasion of Ukraine. Visited St. Michael's Golden-Domed Monastery. Unannounced visit. |

== See also ==
- Foreign policy of the United States
