= List of presidential trips made by Ronald Reagan (1987) =

This is a list of presidential trips made by Ronald Reagan during 1987, the seventh year of his presidency as the 40th president of the United States. International trips are highlighted in blue.

This list excludes trips made within Washington, D.C., the U.S. federal capital in which the White House, the official residence and principal workplace of the president, is located. It also excludes the capital's immediate surroundings in Maryland and Virginia, such as Andrews Air Force Base in Maryland, where the president typically boards Air Force One for all trips outside the area. Also excluded are trips to Camp David, the country residence of the president, and to Reagan's Rancho del Cielo ranch in Santa Barbara County, California.

== January ==
State or country	Areas visited	Dates	Details
California	Palm Springs	January 1–2	Stayed at Sunnylands.

== February ==
No trips made

== March ==
State or country	Areas visited	Dates	Details
Missouri	Columbia	March 26	Visited Fairview Elementary School and Hickman High School as part of attending a conference between the National Governors Association and the U.S. Department of Education.

== April ==
State or country	Areas visited	Dates	Details
Pennsylvania	Philadelphia	April 1	Visited the College of Physicians of Philadelphia, then attended a college luncheon at the Wyndham Franklin Plaza Hotel. Addressed "We the People", an organization preparing to celebrate the upcoming bicentennial of the signing of the United States Constitution (see September 17), at Congress Hall.
Canada	Ottawa	April 4–5	State visit. Met with Governor General Jeanne Sauvé and Prime Minister Brian Mulroney. Addressed parliament.
Indiana	West Lafayette	April 9	Spoke at Purdue University's Mackey Arena.
California	Los Angeles	April 9–11	Stayed at the Century Plaza Hotel, where he addressed a Los Angeles World Affairs Council luncheon. Met with members of the Ronald Reagan Presidential Foundation at the home of Henry Earl Singleton.
California	Santa Barbara	April 18, 19	Visited Camp Ronald McDonald for Good Times. Attended Easter service at the First Presbyterian Church.

== May ==
State or country	Areas visited	Dates	Details
New York	New York	May 3	Addressed the American Newspaper Publishers Association 100th anniversary convention and discussed the Iran–Contra affair at Ellis Island, which was then being converted into a museum.
Pennsylvania	York	May 6	Visited the Harley-Davidson plant, which was holding a discussion forum between employees and management.
New York	Roslyn	May 9	Attended the funeral of William J. Casey, Reagan's Director of Central Intelligence until January 1987, at St. Mary's Roman Catholic Church.
Alabama	Tuskegee	May 10	Gave the commencement address at Tuskegee University, and dedicated the university's new basketball arena, the General Daniel "Chappie" James Center.
North Carolina	Fayetteville	May 10	Attended a celebration of the 40th anniversary of the United States Air Force at Pope Air Force Base, hosted by Bob Hope.
Tennessee	Chattanooga	May 19	Spoke at a graduation ceremony for area high schools at McKenzie Arena.
Florida	Jacksonville	May 22	Attended a memorial service at Naval Station Mayport for sailors killed in the USS Stark incident five days earlier.

== June ==
State or country	Areas visited	Dates	Details
Italy	Venice, Rome	June 3–11	Attended the 13th G7 summit. Met with President Francesco Cossiga and Prime Minister Amintore Fanfani in Rome.
Vatican City	Apostolic Palace	June 6	Audience with Pope John Paul II.
West Germany	West Berlin, Bonn	June 11–12	Attended celebrations commemorating the 750th anniversary of the founding of Berlin. Met with Chancellor Helmut Kohl. Delivered the "Tear down this wall!" speech in front of the Brandenburg Gate.
Florida	Melbourne	June 22	Toured the Dictaphone Corporation headquarters during an Employee Appreciation Day picnic. Addressed the Greater South Brevard Area Chamber of Commerce at the Melbourne Municipal Auditorium.

== July ==
State or country	Areas visited	Dates	Details
Connecticut	New Britain	July 8	Spoke at Benevolent and Protective Order of Elks Lodge 957 and City Hall.
Indiana	Danville, Indianapolis	July 13	Spoke at the Hendricks County Courthouse. Addressed the National Association of Counties convention at the Indiana Convention Center.
Wisconsin	Hartford, West Bend, Port Washington	July 27	Visited the Broan Manufacturing Company plant in Hartford. Addressed a West Bend Rotary Club luncheon at the Old Washington House. Spoke at Lower Lake Park in Port Washington.

== August ==
State or country	Areas visited	Dates	Details
Nebraska	North Platte	August 13	Visited the ranch of local artist Ted Long. Spoke at Buffalo Bill Wild West Arena.
California	Los Angeles	August 26–28	Addressed the Town Hall of California at Century Plaza Towers. Met with Nicaraguan Contras at the Century Plaza Hotel, where he also stayed overnight. Visited the homes of Betsy Bloomingdale and Lew Wasserman. Spoke about the Robert Bork Supreme Court nomination to a gathering of law enforcement officials at the hotel.

== September ==
State or country	Areas visited	Dates	Details
Kansas	Topeka	September 6	Visited the home of former Kansas governor and presidential candidate Alf Landon for a celebration of his 100th birthday.
Florida	Miami	September 10	Greeted Pope John Paul II upon arrival at Miami International Airport, then visited the Vizcaya Museum and Gardens with the Pope.
Pennsylvania	Philadelphia	September 17	Attended the "We the People" celebration of the 200th anniversary of the signing of the United States Constitution at Independence Hall. Campaigned for Senator John Heinz at the Wyndham Franklin Plaza Hotel.
New York	New York	September 21	Addressed the opening session of the 42nd United Nations General Assembly.

== October ==
State or country	Areas visited	Dates	Details
New Jersey	Somerset, Whippany	October 13	Attended a forum for state government officials and business leaders at Somerset Technologies. Addressed a New Jersey Chamber of Commerce luncheon at the Somerset Hilton Hotel. Addressed the New Jersey Republican State Committee at the Hanover Marriott Hotel.
New York	West Point	October 28	Visited the United States Military Academy.
Arizona	Phoenix	October 30–November 1	Stayed at the Arizona Biltmore Hotel. Attended the funeral of his mother-in-law Edith Luckett Davis at St. Thomas the Apostle Church.

== November ==
State or country	Areas visited	Dates	Details
Colorado	Denver, Waterton	November 24	Spoke about the Strategic Defense Initiative at the Martin Marietta Denver Astronautics plant.

== December ==
State or country	Areas visited	Dates	Details
Florida	Jacksonville	December 1	Took questions from local high school seniors at Jacksonville Veterans Memorial Coliseum.
California	Los Angeles, Palm Springs	December 27–31	Stayed at the Century Plaza Hotel. Spent New Year's Eve at Sunnylands.
