= List of United States presidential visits to Northern Europe =

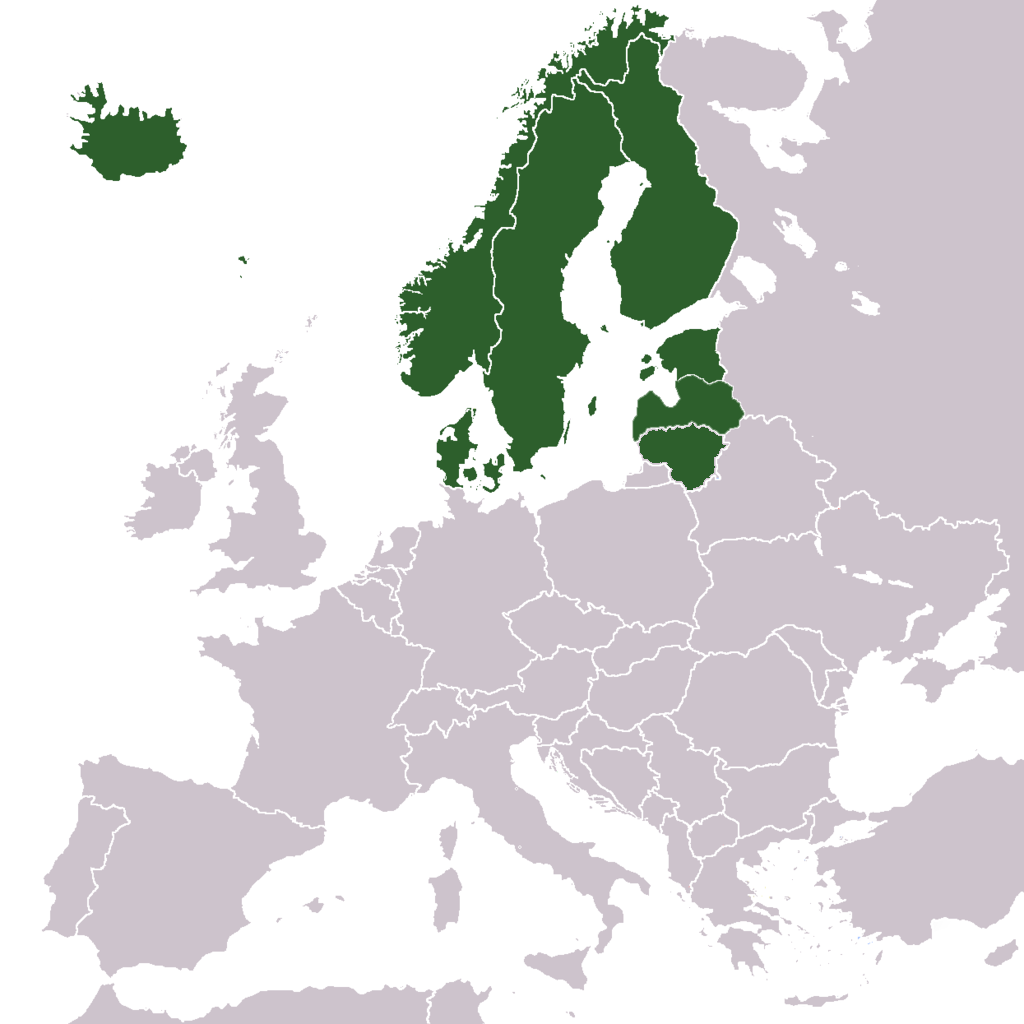
Map of Europe featuring the countries of Northern Europe (highlighted in dark green)

Seven United States presidents have made presidential visits to Northern Europe. Richard Nixon became the first incumbent president to visit a Northern European country when he went to Iceland in 1973. The first trips were an offshoot of the general easing of the geo-political tensions between the U.S. and the Soviet Union during the Cold War. To date, every nation in the region has been visited at least twice: Finland (7), Denmark (4), Latvia (3), Estonia (2), Iceland (2), Norway (2), Sweden (2), and Lithuania (2).

== Table of visits ==
President	Dates	Countries	Locations	Key details
Richard Nixon	May 31 – June 1, 1973	Iceland	Reykjavík	Met with President Kristján Eldjárn and Prime Minister Ólafur Jóhannesson and French president Georges Pompidou.
Gerald Ford	July 29 – August 2, 1975	Finland	Helsinki	Attended opening session of the Conference on Security and Cooperation in Europe. Met with the Heads of State and Government of Finland, Great Britain, Turkey, West Germany, France, Italy and Spain. Also met with Soviet general secretary Leonid Brezhnev. Signed the Final Act of the Conference.
Ronald Reagan	October 9–12, 1986	Iceland	Reykjavík	Summit meeting with Soviet general secretary Mikhail Gorbachev. Also met with President Vigdís Finnbogadóttir.
Ronald Reagan	May 25–29, 1988	Finland	Helsinki	Met with President Mauno Koivisto and Prime Minister Harri Holkeri.
George H. W. Bush	September 8–9, 1990	Finland	Helsinki	Summit meeting with Soviet president Mikhail Gorbachev. Issued joint statement on the Persian Gulf crisis. Also met with President Mauno Koivisto.
George H. W. Bush	July 8–10, 1992	Finland	Helsinki	Attended Organization for Security and Co-operation in Europe summit meeting.
Bill Clinton	July 6, 1994	Latvia	Riga	Met with the presidents of the Baltic states.
Bill Clinton	March 20–21, 1997	Finland	Helsinki	Summit meeting with Russian president Boris Yeltsin. Also met with President Martti Ahtisaari.
Bill Clinton	July 11–12, 1997	Denmark	Copenhagen	Met with Queen Margrethe II and Prime Minister Poul Nyrup Rasmussen.
Bill Clinton	November 1–2, 1999	Norway	Oslo	State visit. Held discussions with Prime Minister Kjell Magne Bondevik Attended commemorative ceremony for former Israeli prime minister Yitzhak Rabin. Met with Russian prime minister Vladimir Putin; also met with Palestinian Authority Chairman Yasser Arafat and Prime Minister Ehud Barak of Israel.
George W. Bush	June 14–15, 2001	Sweden	Gothenburg	Attended U.S.-European Union Summit Meeting. Met with King Carl XVI Gustaf and Prime Minister Göran Persson.
George W. Bush	November 22–23, 2002	Lithuania	Vilnius	Met with the presidents of the Baltic states. Gave a historic speech in the Town Hall Square "Anyone who would choose Lithuania as an enemy has also made an enemy of the United States of America."
George W. Bush	May 6–7, 2005	Latvia	Riga	Met with the presidents of the Baltic states.
George W. Bush	July 5–6, 2005	Denmark	Kastrup, Fredensborg, Copenhagen	Met with Queen Margrethe II and Prime Minister Anders Fogh Rasmussen.
George W. Bush	November 27–28, 2006	Estonia	Tallinn	Met with President Toomas Hendrik Ilves.
George W. Bush	November 28–29, 2006	Latvia	Riga	Attended the 19th NATO Summit Meeting.
Barack Obama	October 2, 2009	Denmark	Copenhagen	Met with Queen Margrethe II and Prime Minister Lars Løkke Rasmussen. Attended the 13th Olympic Congress meeting to lobby for Chicago's bid to host the 2016 Summer Olympics.
Barack Obama	December 9–11, 2009	Norway	Oslo	Met with King Harald V and Queen Sonja. Received the Nobel Peace Prize.
Barack Obama	December 17–19, 2009	Denmark	Copenhagen	Attended the United Nations Climate Change Conference 2009.
Barack Obama	September 4–5, 2013	Sweden	Stockholm	Met with King Carl XVI Gustaf and Prime Minister Fredrik Reinfeldt. Also met with leaders of the Nordic countries. Attended an event honoring Raoul Wallenberg at the Great Synagogue of Stockholm.
Barack Obama	September 3–4, 2014	Estonia	Tallinn	Met with the presidents of the Baltic states. Visited U.S. and Estonian members of the military. Delivered a speech at Tallinn Airport with Prime Minister Taavi Rõivas.
Donald Trump	July 15–16, 2018	Finland	Helsinki	Attended the summit meeting with the Russian president Vladimir Putin. Also met with President Sauli Niinistö.
Joe Biden	July 10–12, 2023	Lithuania	Vilnius	Attended the 2023 NATO Summit, met with the Lithuanian president Gitanas Nausėda.
Joe Biden	July 12–13, 2023	Finland	Helsinki	Attended the U.S.–Nordic Leaders' Summit. Met with President Sauli Niinistö and Prime Minister Petteri Orpo.

== See also ==
- Foreign policy of the United States
