= Winnebago County Courthouse (Wisconsin) =

- U.S. National Register of Historic Places
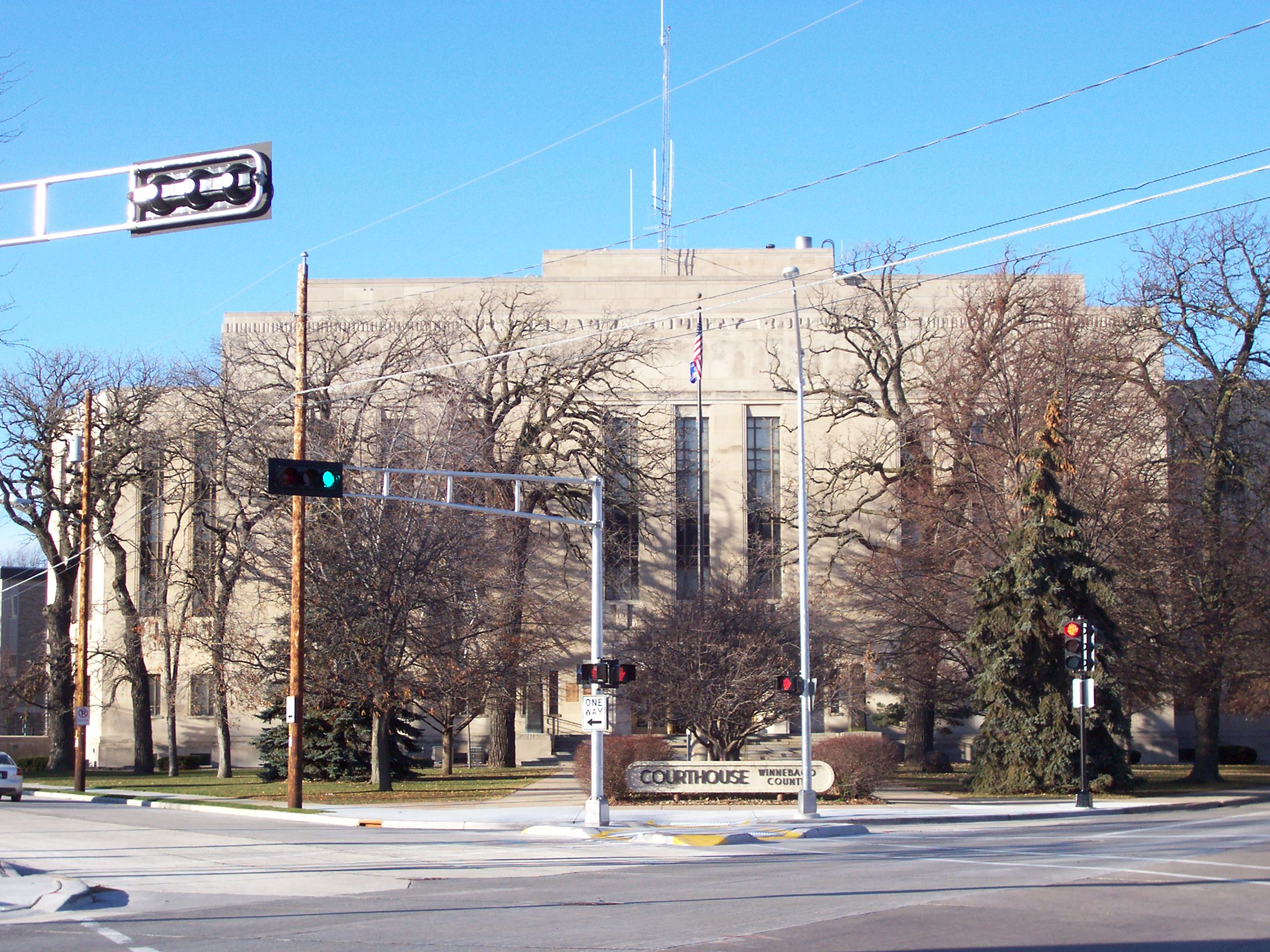

- Location within Wisconsin
- Interactive map showing the location of Winnebago County Courthouse
- Location: 415 Jackson St., Oshkosh, Wisconsin
- Coordinates: 44°01′17″N 88°32′35″W
- Area: 2.5 acres (1.0 ha)
- Built: 1937
- Architect: Frank Venning; Granger & Bollenbacher
- Architectural style: Moderne, Art Deco
- MPS: County Courthouses of Wisconsin TR
- NRHP reference No.: 82000736
- Added to NRHP: June 23, 1982

The Winnebago County Courthouse is a five-story county courthouse built in 1937 and located in Oshkosh, Wisconsin. It houses the circuit court and government offices of Winnebago County, Wisconsin. The building was listed on the National Register of Historic Places in 1982 and on the State Register of Historic Places in 1989 for its statewide significance as an example of Moderne architecture, a variety of Art Deco.

== History ==
The present courthouse is the third to serve Winnebago County. The first was a small wood frame structure built around 1849, and located in Oshkosh on Court Street between Otter Avenue and Ceape Street. This was augmented in 1854 with a modest brick building nearby to house the county offices. By 1859, the county had secured funds to replace these early buildings with the second courthouse, a large and ornate Cream City brick structure built on the same site in 1859-1860.

By the 1930s, the county sought a more modern building and constructed the present courthouse at the corner of Algoma and Jackson Streets in 1937. Despite the Great Depression, the county board rejected a federal loan for the new courthouse. Even so, the building's architecture closely resembled many federal Public Works Administration projects of the same period. The architect of the courthouse was Frank Venning, of the firm Granger & Bollenbacher based in Chicago. The Lundoff-Bicknell Company was the general contractor for construction. The cost for the structure was $950,000.

The fifth floor of the courthouse was originally designed to serve as the county jail and fulfilled this function until the county opened a new public safety building in 1980.

== Design ==
The courthouse has a symmetrical facade with elements characteristic of PWA Moderne architecture, including smooth walls of Indiana limestone and recessed multi-story columns of glass windows grouped in sets of three. In contrast to the overall plain facade, the building entrances are framed with bas-relief sculptures by artist Alfonso Ianelli, which depict county officials and citizens in Mayan Revival style. The courthouse lobby is faced with smooth Portuguese rose marble and decorated with bronze metalwork. The original courtrooms feature ornate paneling made from a variety of different hardwoods.
