= List of United States presidential visits to North Africa =

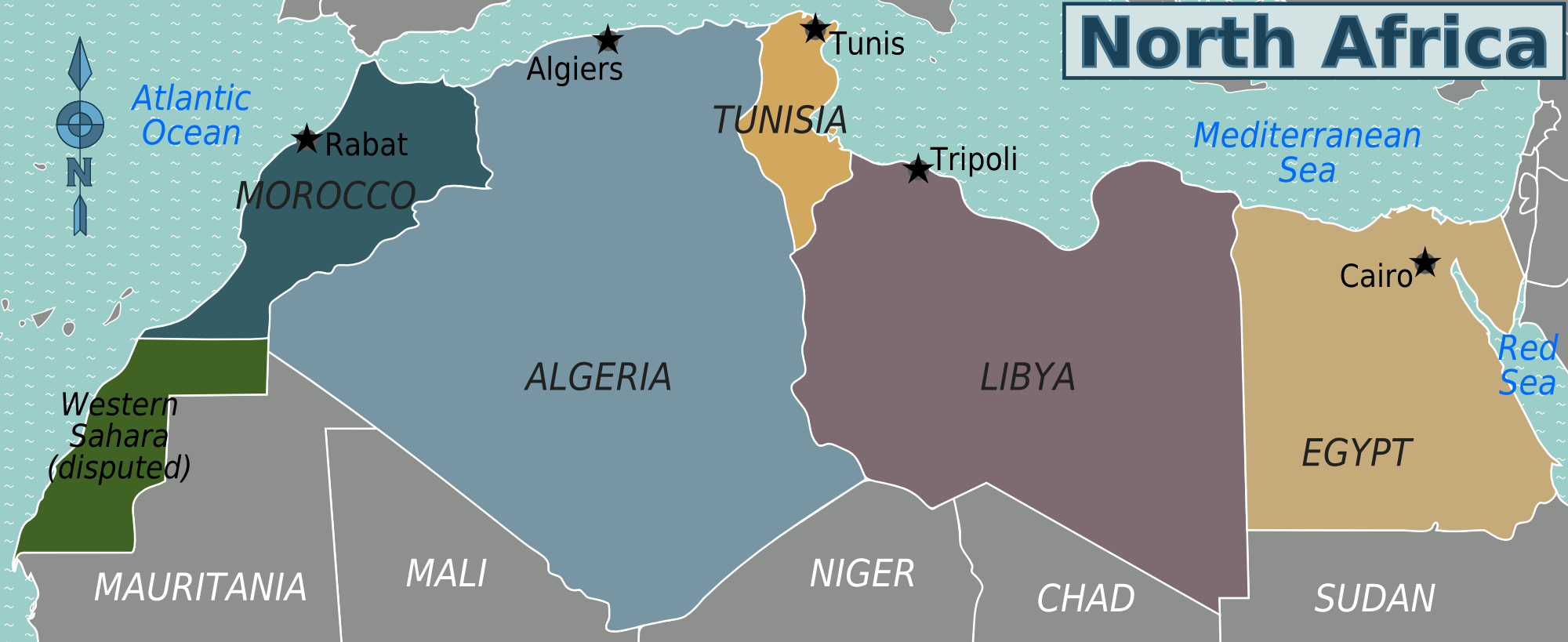
The countries of North Africa and their capitals

Ten presidents of the United States have made presidential visits to North Africa. The first trips by a sitting president to countries in North Africa were those of Franklin D. Roosevelt, and were an offshoot of Allied diplomatic interactions during World War II. Of the five countries in the region, only Libya has not yet been visited by an American president.

== Table of visits ==
President	Dates	Country or territory	Locations	Key details
Franklin D. Roosevelt	January 14–25, 1943	Morocco	Casablanca	Attended Casablanca Conference with British prime minister Winston Churchill.
Franklin D. Roosevelt	November 20–21, 1943	(France) French Algeria	Oran	Disembarked.
Franklin D. Roosevelt	November 21–22, 1943	Tunisia	Tunis	Overnight stop.
Franklin D. Roosevelt	November 22–26, 1943	Egypt	Cairo	Attended First Cairo Conference with British prime minister Churchill and Chinese leader Chiang Kai-shek.
Franklin D. Roosevelt	December 2–7, 1943	Egypt	Cairo	Attended Second Cairo Conference with British prime minister Churchill and Turkish president İsmet İnönü.
Franklin D. Roosevelt	December 7–9, 1943	Tunisia	Tunis	Conferred with General Dwight Eisenhower.
Franklin D. Roosevelt	February 13–15, 1945	Egypt	Great Bitter Lake, Suez Canal, Alexandria	Met with King Farouk, Ethiopian emperor Haile Selassie, Saudi Arabian king Ibn Saud, and British prime minister Churchill.
Franklin D. Roosevelt	February 18, 1945	(France) French Algeria	Algiers	Briefed U.S. ambassadors to the United Kingdom, France, and Italy on the Yalta Conference.
Dwight D. Eisenhower	December 17, 1959	Tunisia	Tunis	Met with President Habib Bourguiba.
Dwight D. Eisenhower	December 22, 1959	Morocco	Casablanca	Met with King Mohammed V.
Richard M. Nixon	June 12–14, 1974	Egypt	Cairo, Alexandria	Met with President Anwar Sadat.
Jimmy Carter	January 4, 1978	Egypt	Aswan	Met with President Sadat and German chancellor Helmut Schmidt.
Jimmy Carter	March 7–10, 1979	Egypt	Cairo, Alexandria, Giza	State visit; met with President Sadat and addressed the People's Assembly.
Jimmy Carter	March 13, 1979	Egypt	Cairo	Met with President Sadat.
George H. W. Bush	November 22–23, 1990	Egypt	Cairo	Discussed the Persian Gulf crisis with President Hosni Mubarak.
Bill Clinton	October 25–26, 1994	Egypt	Cairo	Met with President Mubarak and Palestine Liberation Organization chairman Yasser Arafat.
Bill Clinton	March 13, 1996	Egypt	Sharm el-Sheikh	Attended the Summit of the Peacemakers.
Bill Clinton	July 25, 1999	Morocco	Rabat	Attended the funeral of King Hassan II; met with Palestinian National Authority president Yasser Arafat and Israeli prime minister Ehud Barak.
Bill Clinton	August 29, 2000	Egypt	Cairo	Briefed President Mubarak on the Middle East Peace Process.
Bill Clinton	October 16–17, 2000	Egypt	Sharm el-Sheikh	Attended Israeli-Palestinian Summit Meeting.
George W. Bush	June 2–3, 2003	Egypt	Sharm el-Sheikh	Attended "Red Sea Summit" with the leaders of Bahrain, Egypt, Jordan, and Saudi Arabia, and with Palestinian prime minister Mahmoud Abbas.
George W. Bush	January 16, 2008	Egypt	Sharm el-Sheikh	Met with President Mubarak.
George W. Bush	May 17–18, 2008	Egypt	Sharm el-Sheikh	Met with President Mubarak, King Abdullah II of Jordan, Palestinian National Authority president Abbas and Prime Minister Salam Fayyad, Afghan president Hamid Karzai and Pakistani prime minister Yousaf Raza Gillani. Addressed the World Economic Forum.
Barack Obama	June 4, 2009	Egypt	Cairo	Met with President Mubarak and delivered and address at Cairo University.
Joe Biden	November 11, 2022	Egypt	Sharm el-Sheikh	Met with President Abdel Fattah el-Sisi. Attended the COP27 at Tonino Lamborghini International Convention Center.
Donald Trump	October 13, 2025	Egypt	Sharm el-Sheikh	Attended a Middle East Peace Ceremony in order to finalize a Gaza hostages-for-ceasefire deal.

=== Visits by former presidents ===
1. Ulysses S. Grant visited Alexandria, Egypt, met with Khedive Isma'il Pasha, sailed up the Nile to tour the Valley of the Kings, and traveled by train down the length of the Suez Canal in 1878, during a post-presidency world tour.
2. Richard Nixon (without official State Department credentials) attended the funeral of Mohammad Reza Pahlavi, former shah of Iran, in Cairo, July 29, 1980.
3. Richard Nixon, Gerald Ford and Jimmy Carter were among the dignitaries representing the United States at the funeral of Egyptian president Sadat in Cairo, October 10, 1981.

== See also ==
- Algeria–United States relations
- Egypt–United States relations
- Libya–United States relations
- Morocco–United States relations
- Tunisia–United States relations
- Foreign policy of the United States
- Foreign relations of the United States
