= List of United States presidential visits to the Middle East =

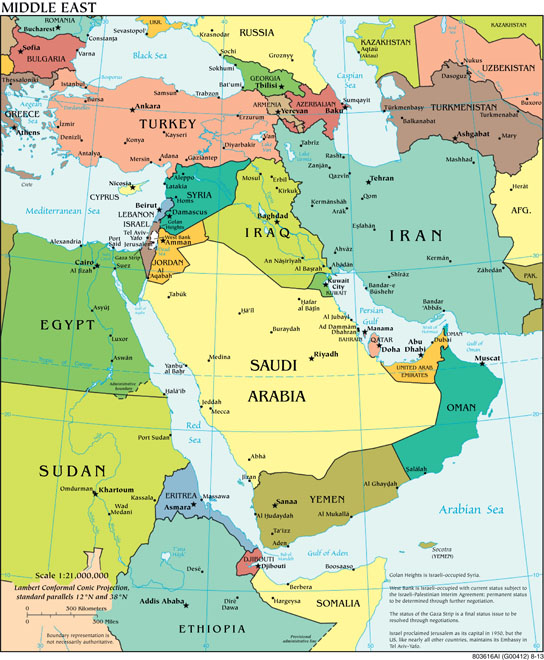
The countries of Middle East

Ten United States presidents have made presidential visits to the Middle East. The first trips by an incumbent president to countries in (or partly within) the Middle East were those by Franklin D. Roosevelt, and were an offshoot of Allied diplomatic interactions during World War II. To date, 17 visits have been made to Egypt, 14 to Saudi Arabia, 14 to Israel, seven to Turkey, six to both Iraq and Jordan, four to Iran, three to the Palestinian Territories, two to Kuwait, Syria, Qatar, and the United Arab Emirates, one to Bahrain, Georgia, and Oman. No incumbent American president has yet visited Armenia, Azerbaijan, Cyprus, Lebanon, and Yemen.

== Table of visits ==
President	Dates	Countries	Locations	Key details
Franklin D. Roosevelt	November 22–26, 1943	Egypt	Cairo	Attended First Cairo Conference with British prime minister Churchill and Chinese leader Chiang Kai-shek.
Franklin D. Roosevelt	November 27 – December 2, 1943	Iran	Tehran	Attended Tehran Conference with Soviet Premier Joseph Stalin and British Prime Minister Winston Churchill.
Franklin D. Roosevelt	December 2–7, 1943	Egypt	Cairo	Attended Second Cairo Conference with British prime minister Churchill and Turkish president İsmet İnönü.
Franklin D. Roosevelt	February 13–15, 1945	Egypt	Great Bitter Lake, Suez Canal, Alexandria	Met with King Farouk, Ethiopian emperor Haile Selassie, Saudi Arabian king Ibn Saud, and British Prime Minister Churchill.
Dwight D. Eisenhower	December 6–7, 1959	Turkey	Ankara	Informal Visit. Met with President Celâl Bayar.
Dwight D. Eisenhower	December 14, 1959	Iran	Tehran	Met with Shah Mohammad Reza Pahlavi. Addressed Parliament.
Richard Nixon	May 30–31, 1972	Iran	Tehran	Official Visit. Met with Shah Mohammad Reza Pahlavi.
Richard Nixon	June 12–14, 1974	Egypt	Cairo, Alexandria	Met with President Anwar Sadat.
Richard Nixon	June 14–15, 1974	Saudi Arabia	Jeddah	Met with King Faisal.
Richard Nixon	June 15–16, 1974	Syria	Damascus	Met with President Hafez al-Assad.
Richard Nixon	June 16–17, 1974	Israel	Tel Aviv, Jerusalem	Met with President Ephraim Katzir and Prime Minister Yitzhak Rabin.
Richard Nixon	June 17–18, 1974	Jordan	Amman	State Visit. Met with King Hussein.
Jimmy Carter	December 31, 1977 – January 1, 1978	Iran	Tehran	Official visit. Met with Shah Mohammad Reza Pahlavi and King Hussein of Jordan. As of 2026, this is the last time a U.S. president has visited the country.
Jimmy Carter	January 3–4, 1978	Saudi Arabia	Riyadh	Met with King Khalid and Crown Prince Fahd.
Jimmy Carter	January 4, 1978	Egypt	Aswan	Met with President Sadat and German Chancellor Helmut Schmidt.
Jimmy Carter	March 7–9, 1979	Egypt	Cairo, Alexandria, Giza	State visit; met with President Sadat and addressed the People's Assembly.
Jimmy Carter	March 10–13, 1979	Israel	Tel Aviv, Jerusalem	State Visit. Met with President Yitzhak Navon and Prime Minister Menachem Begin. Addressed the Knesset.
Jimmy Carter	March 13, 1979	Egypt	Cairo	Met with President Sadat.
George H. W. Bush	November 21–22, 1990	Saudi Arabia	Jeddah, Dhahran	Met with King Fahd and the Amir of Kuwait. Addressed U.S. and British military personnel in eastern Saudi Arabia.
George H. W. Bush	November 22–23, 1990	Egypt	Cairo	Discussed the Persian Gulf crisis with President Hosni Mubarak.
George H. W. Bush	July 20–22, 1991	Turkey	Ankara, Istanbul	Met with President Turgut Ozal.
George H. W. Bush	December 31, 1992	Saudi Arabia	Riyadh	Met with King Fahd.
Bill Clinton	October 25–26, 1994	Egypt	Cairo	Met with President Hosni Mubarak and PLO Chairman Yasser Arafat.
Bill Clinton	October 26–27, 1994	Jordan	Aqaba, Wadi Arava, Amman	Attended the signing of the Israel-Jordan peace agreement. Addressed the Jordanian Parliament.
Bill Clinton	October 27, 1994	Syria	Damascus	Met with President Hafez al-Assad.
Bill Clinton	October 27–28, 1994	Israel	Jerusalem	Met with senior Israeli officials. Addressed the Knesset.
Bill Clinton	October 28, 1994	Kuwait	Kuwait City	Met with Emir Jaber Al-Ahmad Al-Sabah. Addressed U.S. military personnel.
Bill Clinton	October 28, 1994	Saudi Arabia	King Khalid Military City	Met with King Fahd.
Bill Clinton	November 5–6, 1995	Israel	Jerusalem	Attended the funeral of Prime Minister Yitzhak Rabin.
Bill Clinton	March 13, 1996	Egypt	Sharm el-Sheikh	Attended the Summit of the Peacemakers.
Bill Clinton	March 13–14, 1996	Israel	Jerusalem, Tel Aviv	Discussed cooperation against terrorism with senior Israeli officials.
Bill Clinton	December 12–15, 1998	Israel	Jerusalem, Masada	Met with Prime Minister Benjamin Netanyahu and senior Israeli officials.
Bill Clinton	December 14–15, 1998	Palestinian National Authority	Gaza, Bethlehem, Erez	Addressed Palestine National Council. Attended a meeting with Prime Minister Benjamin Netanyahu and Chairman Yasser Arafat.
Bill Clinton	February 8, 1999	Jordan	Amman	Attended the funeral of King Hussein.
Bill Clinton	November 15–19, 1999	Turkey	Ankara, İzmit, Ephesus, Istanbul	State Visit. Attended Organization for Security and Cooperation in Europe Summit meeting.
Bill Clinton	March 25, 2000	Oman	Muscat	Met with Sultan Qaboos bin Said.
Bill Clinton	August 29, 2000	Egypt	Cairo	Briefed President Hosni Mubarak on the Middle East Peace Process.
Bill Clinton	October 16–17, 2000	Egypt	Sharm el-Sheikh	Attended the Israeli-Palestinian Summit Meeting.
George W. Bush	June 2–3, 2003	Egypt	Sharm el-Sheikh	Attended "Red Sea Summit" with the leaders of Bahrain, Egypt, Jordan, and Saudi Arabia, and with Palestinian prime minister Mahmoud Abbas.
George W. Bush	June 4, 2003	Jordan	Aqaba	Attended meetings with Israeli prime minister Ariel Sharon and Palestinian prime minister Mahmoud Abbas. Met with King Abdullah II.
George W. Bush	June 4–5, 2003	Qatar	Doha	Met with Emir Hamad bin Khalifa Al Thani. Visited U.S. Central Command headquarters and addressed U.S. military personnel.
George W. Bush	November 27, 2003	Iraq	Baghdad	Met with members of the Coalition Provisional Authority and the Iraqi Governing Council. Addressed U.S. military personnel.
George W. Bush	June 26–29, 2004	Turkey	Ankara, Istanbul	Met with President Ahmet Necdet Sezer and Prime Minister Recep Tayyip Erdoğan. Attended the NATO Summit meeting.
George W. Bush	May 9–10, 2005	Georgia	Tbilisi	Met with President Mikheil Saakashvili.
George W. Bush	June 13, 2006	Iraq	Baghdad	Met with Prime Minister Nouri al-Maliki. Addressed U.S. military personnel.
George W. Bush	November 29–30, 2006	Jordan	Amman	Met with King Abdullah II and Iraqi Prime Minister Nouri al-Maliki.
George W. Bush	September 3, 2007	Iraq	Al Asad Airbase	Met with Gen. David Petraeus, Secretary of State Condoleezza Rice, Secretary of Defense Robert Gates, senior U.S. officials, Iraqi political leaders. Addressed U.S military personnel.
George W. Bush	January 9–11, 2008	Israel	Tel Aviv, Jerusalem	Met with Prime Minister Ehud Olmert and President Shimon Peres. Visited Yad Vashem.
George W. Bush	January 10, 2008	Palestinian National Authority	Ramallah, Bethlehem	Met with President Mahmoud Abbas. Visited the Church of the Nativity.
George W. Bush	January 11–12, 2008	Kuwait	Kuwait City, Camp Arifjan	Attended Roundtable on Democracy and Development. Met with Gen. David Petraeus and United States ambassador to Iraq Ryan Crocker. Addressed U.S. military personnel.
George W. Bush	January 12–13, 2008	Bahrain	Manama	Met with King Hamad bin Isa Al Khalifa. Addressed U.S. military personnel.
George W. Bush	January 13–14, 2008	United Arab Emirates	Abu Dhabi, Dubai	Met with President Khalifa bin Zayed Al Nahyan and Prime Minister Mohammed bin Rashid Al Maktoum.
George W. Bush	January 14–16, 2008	Saudi Arabia	Riyadh, Al-Janadriyah	Met with King Abdullah.
George W. Bush	January 16, 2008	Egypt	Sharm el-Sheikh	Met with President Hosni Mubarak.
George W. Bush	May 14–16, 2008	Israel	Tel Aviv, Jerusalem, Masada	Met with President Shimon Peres and Prime Minister Ehud Olmert. Addressed the Knesset. Attended Israel's 60th anniversary. Visited the Masada fortification site.
George W. Bush	May 16–17, 2008	Saudi Arabia	Riyadh, al-Janadriyah	Met with King Abdullah.
George W. Bush	May 17–18, 2008	Egypt	Sharm el-Sheikh	Met with President Hosni Mubarak, King Abdullah II of Jordan, Palestinian Authority president Mahmoud Abbas and prime minister Salam Fayyad, Afghan president Hamid Karzai and Pakistani prime minister Yousaf Raza Gillani. Addressed the World Economic Forum.
George W. Bush	December 14, 2008	Iraq	Baghdad	Met with President Jalal Talabani and Prime Minister Nouri al-Maliki. Signed Strategic Framework and Security Agreements. Visited U.S. military personnel.
Barack Obama	April 5–7, 2009	Turkey	Ankara, Istanbul	Met with President Abdullah Gül and Prime Minister Recep Tayyip Erdoğan. Delivered a speech to the Turkish Parliament. Laid a wreath at Anitkabir Mausoleum, Also met with Ecumenical Patriarch Bartholomew I of Constantinople of the Eastern Orthodox Church, attended the Alliance of Civilizations forum, and participated in a town hall meeting with students at the Tophane Cultural Center.
Barack Obama	April 7–8, 2009	Iraq	Baghdad	Met with President Jalal Talabani and Prime Minister Nouri al-Maliki. Visited with U.S. troops.
Barack Obama	June 3–4, 2009	Saudi Arabia	Riyadh	Met with King Abdullah.
Barack Obama	June 4, 2009	Egypt	Cairo	Met with President Hosni Mubarak. Toured the Giza Pyramids. Delivered a speech at Cairo University.
Barack Obama	March 20–22, 2013	Israel	Tel Aviv, Jerusalem	Met with President Shimon Peres and Prime Minister Benjamin Netanyahu. Visited the Shrine of the Book and Yad Vashem, and spoke to students at the International Convention Center.
Barack Obama	March 21–22, 2013	Palestinian National Authority	Ramallah, Al-Bireh, Bethlehem	Met with President Mahmoud Abbas. Visited the Church of the Nativity.
Barack Obama	March 22–23, 2013	Jordan	Amman, Petra	Met with King Abdullah II.
Barack Obama	March 28, 2014	Saudi Arabia	Riyadh	Met with King Abdullah.
Barack Obama	January 27, 2015	Saudi Arabia	Riyadh	Met with the newly appointed king Salman. Also paid respects to the late king Abdullah.
Barack Obama	November 14–17, 2015	Turkey	Antalya	Attended the G-20 Summit Meeting. also met with President Recep Tayyip Erdoğan, King Salman of Saudi Arabia and Russian president Vladimir Putin.
Barack Obama	April 20–21, 2016	Saudi Arabia	Riyadh	Official visit. Met with King Salman. Attended a summit meeting with the Gulf Cooperation Council.
Barack Obama	September 30, 2016	Israel	Jerusalem	Attended the state funeral of former President Shimon Peres.
Donald Trump	May 20–22, 2017	Saudi Arabia	Riyadh	Met with King Salman. Participated in the 2017 Riyadh Summit
Donald Trump	May 22–23, 2017	Israel	Jerusalem	Met with President Reuven Rivlin and Prime Minister Benjamin Netanyahu.
Donald Trump	May 23, 2017	Palestinian National Authority	Bethlehem	Met with Palestinian president Mahmoud Abbas.
Donald Trump	December 26, 2018	Iraq	Al Asad Air Base	Visited with U.S military personnel serving in Western Iraq.
Joe Biden	July 13–15, 2022	Israel	Jerusalem	Met with President Isaac Herzog and Prime Minister Yair Lapid.
Joe Biden	July 15, 2022	Palestinian National Authority	Bethlehem	Met with Palestinian president Mahmoud Abbas.
Joe Biden	July 15–16, 2022	Saudi Arabia	Jeddah	Met with King Salman and Crown Prince Mohammed bin Salman. Participated in the GCC+3 Summit.
Joe Biden	October 18, 2023	Israel	Tel Aviv	Met with Prime Minister Benjamin Netanyahu to show US support for Israel in the Gaza war.
Donald Trump	May 13–14, 2025	Saudi Arabia	Riyadh	Met with Crown Prince Mohammed bin Salman and King Salman. Attended the GCC Summit. Also met with Syrian president Ahmed al-Sharaa.
Donald Trump	May 14–15, 2025	Qatar	Doha	Met with Emir Tamim bin Hamad Al Thani at the Amiri Diwan. Visited Lusail Palace for Qatari State dinner.
Donald Trump	May 15–16, 2025	United Arab Emirates	Abu Dhabi	Met with President Mohammed bin Zayed.
Donald Trump	October 13, 2025	Israel	Jerusalem	Met with Prime Minister Benjamin Netanyahu, in order to finalize a Gaza hostages-for-ceasefire deal. Met with families of freed hostages. Addressed the Knesset.
Donald Trump	October 13, 2025	Egypt	Sharm el-Sheikh	Attended the 2025 Gaza peace summit in order to finalize a Gaza hostages-for-ceasefire deal.
Donald Trump	July 7–8, 2026	Turkey	Ankara	Attended the NATO Summit Meeting.

=== Visits by former presidents ===
1. Ulysses S. Grant visited Alexandria, Egypt, met with Khedive Isma'il Pasha, sailed up the Nile to tour the Valley of the Kings, and travelled by train down the length of the Suez Canal in 1878, during a post-presidency world tour. During the same tour, he visited Jerusalem.
2. Richard Nixon (without official State Department credentials) attended the funeral of Mohammad Reza Pahlavi, former Shah of Iran, in Cairo, Egypt, March 8, 1980.
3. Richard Nixon, Gerald Ford and Jimmy Carter were among the dignitaries representing the United States at the funeral of Egyptian president Sadat in Cairo, October 10, 1981.
4. Gerald Ford, Jimmy Carter, and George H. W. Bush attended the state funeral of King Hussein of Jordan in Amman, February 8, 1999.
5. Jimmy Carter visited on the occasion of Palestinian elections in January 2005 and January 2006.
6. Bill Clinton attended the state funeral of former Israeli president Shimon Peres in Jerusalem, September 30, 2016.

== See also ==
- United States foreign policy in the Middle East
- United States Special Envoy to the Organisation of Islamic Cooperation
