= List of presidential trips made by George W. Bush (2004) =

This is a list of presidential trips made by George W. Bush during 2004, the fifth year of his presidency as the 43rd president of the United States. International trips are highlighted in blue.

This list excludes trips made within Washington, D.C., the U.S. federal capital in which the White House, the official residence and principal workplace of the president, is located. It also excludes the capital's immediate surroundings in Maryland and Virginia, such as Andrews Air Force Base in Maryland, where the president typically boards Air Force One for all trips outside the area. Also excluded are trips to Camp David, the country residence of the president, and to the Bush family's Prairie Chapel Ranch near Crawford and Walker's Point Estate in Kennebunkport, Maine.

== January ==
State or country	Areas visited	Dates	Details
Texas	Falfurrias	January 1	Hunted quail at El Tule Ranch with former president George H. W. Bush and James Baker. First public hunting trip during Bush's presidency.
Missouri	St. Louis	January 5	Campaign event at America's Center. Visited a fourth-grade class at Pierre Laclede Elementary School.
Tennessee	Knoxville	January 8	Visited children at West View Elementary School. Campaign event at Knoxville Convention Center.
Florida	Palm Beach Gardens	January 8	Campaign event at PGA National Resort.
Mexico	Monterrey	January 12–13	Attended the Special Summit of the Americas.
Louisiana	New Orleans	January 15	Participated in a roundtable discussion with faith leaders at Union Bethel A.M.E. Church. Campaign event at the National D-Day Museum.
Georgia	Atlanta	January 15	Observed Martin Luther King Jr. Day by laying a wreath at King's tomb at the King Center for Nonviolent Social Change. Campaign event at the Georgia World Congress Center.
Ohio	Toledo, Perrysburg Township	January 21	Took questions at Owens Community College.
Arizona	Phoenix	January 21–22	Took questions at Mesa Community College.
New Mexico	Roswell	January 22	Press conference at the Roswell Convention and Civic Center.
Arkansas	Little Rock	January 26	Discussed medical liability reform at Baptist Health Medical Center.
New Hampshire	Merrimack	January 29	Took questions at Fidelity Investments offices. Visited a local business, Swan Chocolates.
Connecticut	Old Greenwich	January 29	Campaign event at the Hyatt Regency Hotel.
Pennsylvania	Philadelphia	January 31	Spoke to the Congress of Tomorrow luncheon at the Loews Philadelphia Hotel.

== February ==
State or country	Areas visited	Dates	Details
South Carolina	Charleston	February 5	Gave a speech at the Port of Charleston.
Missouri	Springfield	February 9	Toured a local business, SRC Automotive, Inc.
Pennsylvania	Harrisburg	February 12	Spoke on the Jobs for the 21st Century Initiative at Central Dauphin High School.
Florida	Daytona Beach, Tampa	February 15	Attended the 2004 Daytona 500.
Louisiana	Fort Polk	February 17	Spoke to troops at Fort Polk Army Airfield.
Kentucky	Louisville	February 26	Toured a local business, ISCO Industries. Campaign event at Galt House Hotel.

== March ==
State or country	Areas visited	Dates	Details
California	Los Angeles, Bakersfield, Santa Clara	March 3–4	Met with representatives of faith-based initiatives at the Los Angeles Convention Center. Campaign events at the Shrine Auditorium and Expo Hall and Santa Clara Convention Center. Took questions at a Bakersfield local business, Rain for Rent. Attended a Republican National Committee fundraising dinner at a private residence.
Texas	Dallas, Houston	March 8	Campaign events at the Fairmont Hotel and the Hilton Americas. Attended the Houston Livestock Show and Rodeo at Reliant Arena.
Ohio	Cleveland	March 10	Toured the Thermagon, Inc., manufacturing plant. Spoke at the Women's Entrepreneurship in the 21st Century Forum at the Cleveland Convention Center.
New York	East Farmingdale, Bay Shore, East Meadow	March 11	Toured U.S.A. Industries, Inc. Attended the groundbreaking ceremony for the Nassau County 9/11 Memorial.
Pennsylvania	Philadelphia, Ardmore	March 15	Took questions at the Main Line YMCA. Met with a first-time homebuyer.
Kentucky	Fort Campbell	March 18	Toured the Don F. Pratt Memorial Museum.
Florida	Orlando	March 20	Speech at the Orange County Convention Center.
New Hampshire	Manchester, Nashua	March 25	Toured New Hampshire Community Technical College Nashua Campus.
Massachusetts	Boston	March 25	Speech at the Hilton Boston Park Plaza.
New Mexico	Albuquerque	March 26	Speech at Expo New Mexico.
Arizona	Phoenix	March 26	Took questions at the Carpenters Training Center.
Wisconsin	Appleton	March 30	Speech at the Fox Cities Performing Arts Center. Met with local first responders at the Radisson Hotel.

== April ==
State or country	Areas visited	Dates	Details
West Virginia	Huntington	April 2	Took questions at Marshall Community and Technical College.
Georgia	Greensboro	April 2	
North Carolina	Charlotte	April 5	Met with job training program participants at Central Piedmont Community College Central Campus. Campaign event at the Charlotte Convention Center.
Missouri	St. Louis	April 5	Threw the first pitch at Busch Memorial Stadium on Opening Day.
Arkansas	El Dorado	April 6	Took questions at South Arkansas Community College.
Texas	Fort Hood	April 11	Attended Easter Sunday services at the military chapel.
Iowa	Des Moines	April 15	Speech hosted by the Federal Home Loan Bank of Des Moines at the Des Moines Marriott Downtown.
Pennsylvania	Harrisburg, Hershey, Pittsburgh	April 19	Speech at the Hershey Lodge. Spoke at a dinner for Senator Arlen Specter at the David L. Lawrence Convention Center.
New York	Buffalo, New York	April 20	Spoke about the Patriot Act at Kleinhans Music Hall. Campaign event at the River Club.
Maine	Wells	April 22	Observed Earth Day at the Wells National Estuarine Research Reserve.
Florida	Naples, Miami, Coral Gables	April 23	Toured the Rookery Bay National Estuarine Research Reserve. Attended a Victory 2004 luncheon at a private residence. Campaign event at the Hyatt Regency Hotel in Coral Gables.
Minnesota	Minneapolis, Edina	April 26	Addressed the American Association of Community Colleges Convention at the Minneapolis Convention Center. Attended a Victory 2004 luncheon at a private residence.
Maryland	Baltimore	April 27	Discussed health care information technology at the VA Medical Center.

== May ==
State or country	Areas visited	Dates	Details
Indiana	South Bend	May 3	Campaigned for Mitch Daniels in gubernatorial election. Began two-day bus tour.
Michigan	Niles, Kalamazoo, Sterling Heights	May 3–4	Took questions at Niles High School. Campaign event at Wings Stadium. Speech at the Jerome-Duncan Ford Theatre at Freedom Hill.
Ohio	Maumee, Dayton, Lebanon, Cincinnati	May 4	Speech at the Lucas County Recreation Center. Took questions at Hara Arena. Spoke at the Golden Lamb Inn and Cincinnati Gardens.
Iowa	Dubuque	May 7	Spoke at the Grand River Event Center.
Wisconsin	Lancaster, Prairie du Chien, La Crosse	May 7	Spoke at the Grant County Courthouse, a Cabela's distribution center, and Copeland Park.
Arkansas	Fort Smith, Van Buren	May 11	Spoke at Butterfield Junior High School.
West Virginia	Parkersburg	May 13	Took questions from the public at Parkersburg South High School.
Missouri	St. Louis, Bridgeton	May 14	Campaign event at the Hunter Engineering Company Research and Training Center.
Wisconsin	Milwaukee, Mequon	May 14	Gave the commencement address at Concordia University Wisconsin.
Kansas	Topeka	May 17	Visited the Monroe Elementary School historic site to mark the 50th anniversary of the Brown v. Board of Education decision.
Georgia	Marietta, Atlanta	May 17	
Louisiana	Baton Rouge, New Orleans, Metairie	May 21	Gave the commencement address at Louisiana State University.
Texas	Austin	May 22	Attended his daughter Jenna's graduation from the University of Texas at Austin.
Connecticut	New Haven	May 23	Attended his daughter Barbara's graduation from Yale University.
Pennsylvania	Carlisle	May 24	Spoke about the War on Terror at the United States Army War College's Thorpe Hall.
Ohio	Vienna Township, Youngstown	May 25	Took questions on health care policy at Bliss Hall at Youngstown State University.
Tennessee	Nashville	May 27	Toured Vanderbilt University Medical Center. Attended a Victory 2004 reception at a private residence.

== June ==
State or country	Areas visited	Dates	Details
Colorado	Denver, Colorado Springs	June 1–2	Gave the commencement address at the United States Air Force Academy.
Italy	Rome	June 4–5	Met with President Carlo Azeglio Ciampi and Prime Minister Silvio Berlusconi.
Vatican City	Apostolic Palace	June 4	Met with Pope John Paul II.
France	Paris, Colleville, Caen, Arromanches	June 5–6	Met with President Jacques Chirac. Attended the 60th anniversary of D-Day ceremonies.
Georgia	Sea Island, Savannah	June 6–10	Hosted the 30th G8 summit.
Texas	Houston	June 12	Attended a celebration for the 80th birthday of his father, former president George H. W. Bush, at Minute Maid Park.
Missouri	Kansas City, Liberty	June 14	Took questions on Medicare policy at the Liberty Community Center.
Florida	Tampa	June 16	Participated in a briefing with military personnel from the U.S. Central Command and Special Operations Command at MacDill Air Force Base.
Washington	Spokane, Seattle, Fort Lewis	June 17–18	Campaigned for George Nethercutt in Senate election at the Spokane Convention Center. Spoke to servicemembers at Madigan Army Medical Center.
Nevada	Reno	June 18	Campaign event at the Reno-Sparks Convention Center.
Ohio	Cincinnati	June 21	Toured the Hamilton County Alcohol and Drug Addiction Services Center. Attended a Victory 2004 dinner at a private residence.
Pennsylvania	Philadelphia, Villanova	June 23	Discussed efforts to combat HIV/AIDS at People for People. Attended a Victory 2004 luncheon at a private residence.
Ireland	Shannon, Dromoland Castle	June 25–26	Attended the U.S.-EU Summit Meeting. Met with Taoiseach Bertie Ahern.
Turkey	Ankara, Istanbul	June 26–29	Met with President Ahmet Necdet Sezer and Prime Minister Recep Tayyip Erdoğan. Attended the NATO Summit meeting.

== July ==
State or country	Areas visited	Dates	Details
West Virginia	Charleston	July 4	Celebrated Independence Day at the West Virginia State Capitol.
North Carolina	Raleigh	July 7	Attended a Victory 2004 luncheon at a private residence.
Michigan	Waterford, Bloomfield Hills	July 7	Met with six of his federal judiciary appointees who had not yet been confirmed by the Senate at Oakland County International Airport. Attended a Victory 2004 dinner at a private residence.
Pennsylvania	Kutztown, Pottstown, Lancaster, York	July 9	Bus tour. Visited Kutztown University of Pennsylvania. Toured a local Lancaster business, Lapp Electrical Service, Inc. Spoke at the Toyota Arena.
Tennessee	Oak Ridge	July 12	Toured the Oak Ridge National Laboratory.
Michigan	Marquette	July 13	Spoke at Northern Michigan University's Superior Dome.
Minnesota	Duluth	July 13	Spoke at the Duluth Entertainment Convention Center.
Wisconsin	Milwaukee, Waukesha, West Bend, Fond du Lac, Oshkosh, Ashwaubenon	July 13–14.	Bus tour. Spoke at the Waukesha County Exposition Center. Visited a local West Bend business, Mick's Candyman. Toured the Mid-States Aluminum Corporation factory. Visited a local Oshkosh business, Leon's Frozen Custard. Spoke at the Resch Center.
Florida	Tampa	July 16	Attended the National Training Conference on Human Trafficking at the Tampa Marriott Waterside.
West Virginia	Beckley	July 16	Spoke at the Raleigh County Armory Civic Center.
Iowa	Cedar Rapids	July 20	Took questions at Kirkwood Community College.
Missouri	St. Charles	July 20	Spoke at the Family Arena.
Illinois	Glenview, Winnetka	July 22	Toured the Northeastern Illinois Public Safety Training Academy. Attended a Victory 2004 dinner at a private residence.
Michigan	Detroit	July 23	Addressed the National Urban League Conference at the Renaissance Center Marriott.
Missouri	Springfield	July 30	Spoke at Hammons Field.
Michigan	Grand Rapids	July 30	Spoke at Grand Rapids Community College.
Ohio	Cleveland, Kirtland Hills, Canton, Cambridge	July 30–31	Attended the 38th International Children's Games at Cleveland Browns Stadium. Attended a Victory 2004 dinner at a private residence. Spoke at the Canton Memorial Civic Center and Don Coss Field.
West Virginia	Triadelphia	July 31	Visited a new Cabela's store.
Pennsylvania	Pittsburgh	July 31	Spoke at David L. Lawrence Convention Center.

== August ==
State or country	Areas visited	Dates	Details
Texas	Dallas	August 3	Addressed the Knights of Columbus Convention at the Hyatt Regency Dallas. Attended a Victory 2004 luncheon at a private residence.
Illinois	Moline	August 4	
Iowa	Davenport	August 4	Spoke at the LeClaire Park Bandshell.
Minnesota	Minneapolis, Le Sueur, Mankato	August 4	Discussed the Conservation Reserve Program on a farm near Le Sueur owned by the Katzenmeyer family. Spoke at a Southern Minnesota Construction quarry.
Ohio	Columbus	August 5	Spoke at the Aladdin Shrine Center.
Michigan	Saginaw	August 5	Spoke at the Wendler Arena.
New Hampshire	Stratham	August 6	Spoke at Bittersweet Farm.
Florida	Pensacola, Niceville, Panama City	August 10	Spoke at the Pensacola Civic Center, Okaloosa-Walton College, and the Panama City Marina.
New Mexico	Albuquerque	August 11	Took questions at Eclipse Aviation headquarters.
Arizona	Phoenix	August 11–12	Spoke at the Arizona Veterans Memorial Coliseum.
Nevada	Las Vegas	August 12	Toured the United Brotherhood of Carpenters and Joiners of America International Training Facility.
California	Los Angeles, Santa Monica	August 12–13	Visited Nancy Reagan at her home after the death of her husband, former president Ronald Reagan, in June. Spoke at Santa Monica Municipal Airport.
Oregon	Portland, Beaverton	August 13	Spoke on the deepening of the Columbia River channel at Rivergate Industrial Park. Took questions at Southridge High School.
Washington	Seattle, Medina, Redmond	August 13–14	Toured the Boeing Delivery Center. Attended a Victory 2004 dinner at a private residence.
Iowa	Sioux City	August 14	Spoke at the Tyson Events Center.
Florida	Fort Myers, Punta Gorda	August 15	Toured the damage from Hurricane Charley two days earlier. Visited the Charlotte County Emergency Operations Center.
Ohio	Cincinnati	August 16	Toured the National Underground Railroad Freedom Center. Addressed the Veterans of Foreign Wars Convention at the Cinergy Center.
Michigan	Traverse City	August 16	Spoke at the Grand Traverse County Civic Center.
Pennsylvania	Ridley Park	August 17	Toured the Boeing Rotorcraft Systems plant.
West Virginia	Hedgesville	August 17	Spoke at Hedgesville High School.
Wisconsin	Chippewa Falls, River Falls, Hudson	August 18	Bus tour. Visited a local Chippewa Falls business, Kell Container Corporation. Visited the Kansas City Chiefs training camp at the University of Wisconsin-River Falls. Took questions at Lakefront Park in Hudson.
Minnesota	St. Paul	August 18	Spoke at the Xcel Energy Center.
New Mexico	Las Cruces, Farmington, Albuquerque	August 26	Spoke at the Pan American Center, Ricketts Park in Farmington, and the Albuquerque Convention Center.
Florida	Miami	August 27	Visited Miami Fire Station #2 during recovery efforts from Hurricane Charley. Spoke at the Miami Arena.
Ohio	Dayton, Troy, Lima, Perrysburg, Toledo	August 28	Bus tour. Spoke at the Troy Public Square, Lima Senior High School, and Fort Meigs.
West Virginia	Wheeling	August 29	Spoke at WesBanco Arena.
New Hampshire	Manchester, Nashua	August 30	Took questions at Nashua High School North.
Michigan	Detroit, Taylor, Dearborn	August 30–31	Spoke at Heritage Park in Taylor.
Tennessee	Nashville	August 31	Addressed the 86th American Legion National Convention at the Gaylord Opryland Resort & Convention Center.
Iowa	Des Moines, Alleman	August 31	Visited the Farm Progress Show
Pennsylvania	North Middleton Township	August 31	

== September ==
State or country	Areas visited	Dates	Details
Ohio	Columbus	September 1	Spoke at the Nationwide Arena.
New York	Elmhurst, New York	September 1–2	Visited firefighters at the Italian Charities of America. Received the Republican presidential nomination at the 2004 Republican National Convention at Madison Square Garden.
Pennsylvania	Wilkes-Barre, Moosic	September 2–3	Spoke at Lackawanna County Stadium.
Wisconsin	Milwaukee, West Allis	September 3	Spoke at the Wisconsin Exposition Center.
Iowa	Cedar Rapids	September 3	Spoke at Noelridge Park.
Ohio	Cleveland, Broadview Heights, Kirtland	September 3–4	Bus tour. Took questions at Brecksville-Broadview Heights High School. Spoke at Lake Farmpark.
Pennsylvania	Erie	September 4	Spoke at Erie Veterans Memorial Stadium.
West Virginia	Parkersburg	September 5	Spoke again at Parkersburg High School.
Missouri	Poplar Bluff, Kansas City, Lee's Summit, Sedalia, Columbia	September 6–7	Bus tour. Spoke at Ray Clinton Park in Poplar Bluff, Lee's Summit High School, the Missouri State Fairgrounds, and the Boone County Fairgrounds.
Florida	Fort Pierce, Miami	September 8	Met with community members affected by Hurricane Frances. Visited the National Hurricane Center headquarters.
Pennsylvania	Colmar, Johnstown	September 9	Spoke at a local business, Byers' Choice, and at the Cambria County War Memorial Arena.
West Virginia	Huntington	September 10	Spoke at Tri-State Airport.
Ohio	Ironton, Portsmouth, Chillicothe	September 10	Bus tour. Spoke at the Lawrence County Courthouse. Visited the Portsmouth Gaseous Diffusion Plant and took questions at Shawnee State University. Spoke at the Ross County Fairgrounds.
Michigan	Muskegon, Holland, Battle Creek	September 13	Bus tour. Took questions on health care at the Muskegon County Airport. Spoke at the Ottawa County Fairgrounds and C.O. Brown Stadium.
Colorado	Aurora, Greenwood Village	September 13–14	Spoke at the Coors Amphitheatre.
Nevada	Las Vegas	September 14	Addressed the General Conference of the National Guard Association of the United States at the Las Vegas Convention Center.
Minnesota	St. Cloud, Blaine, Rochester	September 16	Bus tour. Spoke at Dick Putz Field. Took questions on health care at the National Sports Center Sports Hall in Blaine. Spoke at Mayo Field.
North Carolina	Charlotte	September 17	Took questions on women's issues at the Charlotte Merchandise Mart. Attended a Victory 2004 reception at a private residence.
Florida	Pensacola	September 19	Toured the damage from Hurricane Ivan.
Alabama	Orange Beach	September 19	Toured the damage from Hurricane Ivan.
New Hampshire	Derry	September 20	Took questions at the SportsZone.
New York	New York	September 20–22	Campaign rally at the Sheraton New York Times Square Hotel. Attended the opening of the 59th United Nations General Assembly. Hosted Indian prime minister Manmohan Singh and Iraqi prime minister Ayad Allawi in his suite at the Waldorf-Astoria Hotel.
Pennsylvania	King of Prussia, Millvale, Latrobe	September 22	Took questions on education policy at the Valley Forge Convention Center. Toured the damage from Tropical Depression Ivan. Spoke at Arnold Palmer Regional Airport.
Maine	Bangor	September 23	Spoke at Bangor International Airport.
Wisconsin	Janesville, Racine	September 24	Bus tour. Took questions on education policy at the Janesville Conference Center. Spoke at Racine's Pershing Park.
Ohio	Springfield, Xenia, West Chester	September 27	Bus tour. Took questions on education policy at the Midwest Livestock and Expo Center. Spoke at the Greene County Courthouse and West Chester's Voice of America Park.
Florida	Lake Wales, Stuart, Miami, Coral Gables	September 29–October 1	Toured an orange grove damaged by hurricanes and a local American Red Cross chapter with his brother, Florida governor Jeb Bush. Participated in the first 2004 presidential debate against John Kerry at the Watsco Center. Visited a debate watch party at the Coconut Grove Expo Center.

== October ==
State or country	Areas visited	Dates	Details
Pennsylvania	Allentown	October 1	Spoke at the Lehigh Parkway.
New Hampshire	Manchester	October 1	Spoke at the McIntyre Ski Area.
Ohio	Columbus, Mansfield, Cuyahoga Falls	October 2	Addressed the National Association of Home Builders at the Greater Columbus Convention Center. Took questions at the Renaissance Theatre. Spoke at the Cuyahoga Falls Civic Center.
Iowa	Des Moines, Clive	October 4	Signed the Working Families Tax Relief Act of 2004 at the Des Moines South Suburban YMCA. Spoke at the 7 Flags Event Center in Clive.
Pennsylvania	Wilkes-Barre	October 6	Spoke at the F. M. Kirby Center.
Michigan	Detroit, Farmington Hills	October 6	Spoke at the Oakland Community College Orchard Ridge Campus.
Wisconsin	Wausau	October 7	Spoke at Marathon Park.
Missouri	St. Louis, Ballwin	October 7–9	Participated in the second 2004 presidential debate against John Kerry at the Washington University Field House. Visited a debate watch party at the Greensfelder Recreation Complex in Ballwin. Campaigned for Matt Blunt in the gubernatorial election at America's Center.
Iowa	Waterloo	October 9	Spoke at Riverfront Stadium.
Minnesota	Chanhassen	October 9	Spoke at Center City Park.
New Mexico	Hobbs	October 11	Spoke at the Lea County Event Center.
Colorado	Denver, Morrison, Colorado Springs	October 11–12	Campaigned for Pete Coors in the Senate election at the Wings Over the Rockies Air and Space Museum. Spoke at the Red Rocks Amphitheatre and the Colorado Springs World Arena.
Arizona	Paradise Valley, Phoenix, Tempe	October 12–14	Spoke at the Sanctuary on Camelback Mountain. Participated in the second 2004 presidential debate against John Kerry at the Gammage Auditorium at Arizona State University. Visited a debate watch party at Bank One Ballpark.
Nevada	Las Vegas, Reno	October 14	Spoke at the Thomas & Mack Center and Reno's Rancho San Rafael Park.
Oregon	Central Point, Jacksonville	October 14–15	Spoke at the Jackson County Fairgrounds.
Iowa	Cedar Rapids	October 15	Spoke at the U.S. Cellular Center.
Wisconsin	Oshkosh	October 15	Spoke at the EAA Aviation Museum.
Florida	Sunrise, West Palm Beach, Daytona Beach	October 16	Spoke at Office Depot Center, Sound Advice Amphitheater, and NASCAR offices adjoining the Daytona International Speedway.
New Jersey	Marlton	October 18	Spoke at the Evesham Recreation Center.
Florida	Boca Raton, St. Pete Beach, St. Petersburg, New Port Richey, The Villages	October 18–19	Spoke at Al Lang Stadium, Sims Park, and Lake Sumter Landing Market Square in The Villages.
Iowa	Mason City	October 20	Spoke at the North Iowa Fairgrounds.
Minnesota	Rochester	October 20	Took questions at Rochester International Airport.
Wisconsin	Eau Claire	October 20	Took questions at J&D Manufacturing.
Pennsylvania	Downingtown, Hershey	October 21	Met with Cardinal Rigali at St. Joseph's Parish in Downingtown. Spoke at the United Sports Training Center and at Hersheypark Stadium.
Pennsylvania	Wilkes-Barre	October 22	Spoke at Wachovia Arena.
Ohio	Canton	October 22	Took questions at the Palace Theatre.
Florida	St. Petersburg, St. Pete Beach, Fort Myers, Lakeland, Jacksonville	October 22–23	Attended a Victory 2004 dinner at a private residence. Spoke at City of Palms Park, Ty Cobb Field, Space Coast Stadium, and Alltel Stadium.
New Mexico	Alamogordo	October 24	Spoke at Alamogordo High School.
Colorado	Greeley	October 25	Spoke at Island Grove Regional Park Community Events Center.
Iowa	Council Bluffs, Davenport	October 25	Spoke at the Mid-America Center and the Davenport RiverCenter.
Wisconsin	La Crosse, Onalaska, Richland Center, Cuba City	October 25–26	Bus tour. Spoke at the Onalaska OmniCenter. Took questions at Richland Center High School. Spoke at Cuba City High School.
Iowa	Dubuque	October 26	Spoke at the Grand River Event Center.
Pennsylvania	Lititz	October 27	Spoke at the Lancaster Airport.
Ohio	Vienna Township, Findlay	October 27	Spoke at the Youngstown–Warren Regional Airport and the Hancock County Fairgrounds.
Michigan	Pontiac, Rochester, Saginaw	October 28	Spoke at the Pontiac Silverdome and the Dow Event Center.
Ohio	Dayton, Westlake	October 28	Spoke at Hara Arena and the Westlake Recreation Center.
Pennsylvania	Yardley	October 28	Visited a local farm, Broadmeadows Farm.
New Hampshire	Manchester, Portsmouth	October 29	Spoke at the Verizon Wireless Arena and Pease International Tradeport.
Ohio	Toledo, Columbus	October 29–30	Spoke at SeaGate Convention Centre and Nationwide Arena.
Michigan	Grand Rapids	October 30	Spoke at DeVos Place Convention Center.
Wisconsin	Green Bay, Ashwaubenon	October 30	Spoke at the Brown County Veterans Memorial Arena.
Minnesota	Minneapolis	October 30	Spoke at the Target Center.
Florida	Orlando, Miami, Tampa, Gainesville	October 30–31	Spoke at Tinker Field, the Coconut Grove Expo Center, Legends Field, and the University of Florida Air Center.
Ohio	Cincinnati, Wilmington	October 31–November 1	Spoke at Great American Ball Park and Airborne Airpark.

== November ==
State or country	Areas visited	Dates	Details
Pennsylvania	Pittsburgh, Burgettstown	November 1	Spoke at the Post-Gazette Pavilion at Star Lake.
Wisconsin	Milwaukee	November 1	Spoke at U.S. Cellular Arena.
Iowa	Des Moines, Sioux City	November 1	Spoke at the Iowa State Fairgrounds and the Tyson Events Center.
New Mexico	Albuquerque	November 1	Spoke at the Journal Pavilion.
Texas	University Park	November 1	Spoke at the Moody Coliseum.
Ohio	Columbus	November 2	Took questions at his Ohio state campaign headquarters in German Village.
Arkansas	Little Rock	November 18	Attended the dedication of the William J. Clinton Presidential Library and Museum.
Chile	Santiago	November 19–22	Attended the APEC Summit Meeting.
Colombia	Cartagena	November 22	Met with President Álvaro Uribe.
Canada	Ottawa, Gatineau, Halifax	November 30 – December 1	Met with Lieutenant Governor of Nova Scotia Myra Freeman and Prime Minister Paul Martin. The President spent the night at Lornado, the official residence of the U.S. ambassador in Ottawa, before traveling to Halifax to thank Canadians for their hospitality in hosting stranded Americans on September 11, 2001.

== December ==
State or country	Areas visited	Dates	Details
Pennsylvania	Philadelphia	December 4	Attended the Army–Navy Game at Lincoln Financial Field.
California	Miramar, Camp Pendleton	December 7	Spoke to troops on National Pearl Harbor Remembrance Day.
