= Husky Stadium (disambiguation) =

Husky Stadium is a stadium in Washington, opened in 1920.

Husky Stadium may also refer to:

- Husky Stadium (St. Cloud), a venue in Minnesota, opened in 2004
- Husky Stadium (Houston Christian University), a venue in Texas, opened in 2014

== See also ==
- Huskie Stadium, a stadium in Illinois, opened in 1965
- Huskies Stadium, a stadium in Halifax, Canada, opened 1970 and demolished in 2013
- Husky Ballpark, University of Washington's baseball stadium
- Husky Field (Houston Christian Baseball), Houston Christian University's baseball stadium, opened in 1993.
- Husky Field (softball), Houston Baptist University's softball stadium, opened in 1993.
- Husky Softball Stadium, University of Washington's softball stadium, opened in 1994.
