= North Central Conference =

NCAA Division II athletic conference

- Conference: NCAA
- Founded: 1922
- Folded: 2008
- Sports fielded: 18; men's: 9; women's: 9
- Division: Division II
- No. of teams: 8
- Headquarters: Sioux Falls, South Dakota
- Region: Midwest
- Website: http://northcentral.prestosports.com

Locations
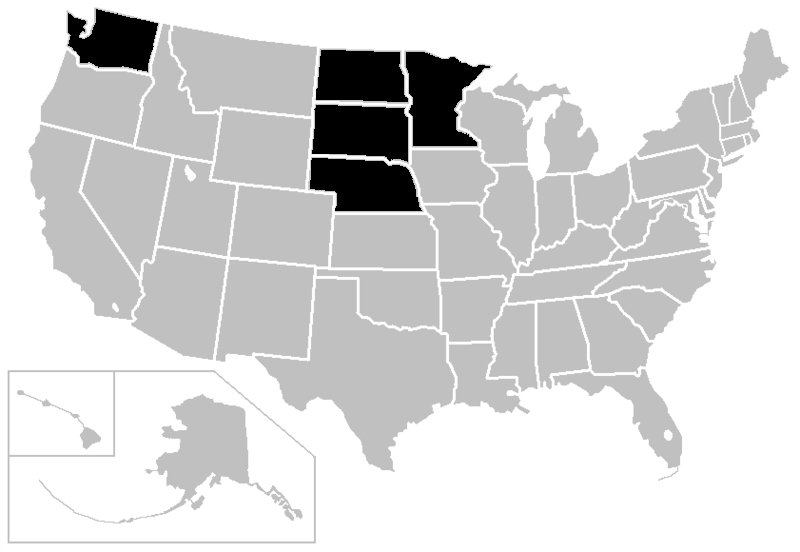

The North Central Conference (NCC), also known as North Central Intercollegiate Athletic Conference, was a college athletic conference which operated in the north central United States. It participated in the NCAA's Division II.

== History ==
The NCC was formed in 1922. Charter members of the NCC were South Dakota State College (now South Dakota State University), College of St. Thomas (now the University of St. Thomas), Des Moines University, Creighton University, North Dakota Agricultural College (now North Dakota State University), the University of North Dakota, Morningside College (now Morningside University), the University of South Dakota, and Nebraska Wesleyan University.

The University of Northern Iowa was a member of the NCC from 1934 until 1978. UNI currently competes in Division I in the Missouri Valley Conference; in FCS football, it competes in the Missouri Valley Football Conference. In 2002 Morningside College left the NCC to join the NAIA. The University of Northern Colorado left the conference in 2003, followed in 2004 by North Dakota State University and South Dakota State University. These three schools all transitioned their athletics programs from Division II to Division I; they became founding members of the Division I FCS Great West Football Conference, which started play in the fall of 2004. Since that time, Northern Colorado moved on to the Big Sky Conference in all sports in 2006. In the fall of 2006, North Dakota State and South Dakota State were admitted to The Summit League; they have also moved on to rejoin old conference mate Northern Iowa in the Missouri Valley Football Conference.

It was announced on November 29, 2006, that the 2007–08 athletic season would be the final season for the NCC and that the conference would cease operations on July 1, 2008.

- The University of North Dakota and the University of South Dakota both announced in 2006 that they would reclassify its athletic programs to Division I, and both left the North Central Conference after the 2007–08 academic year. Both have since joined North Dakota State, South Dakota State, and Northern Iowa as members of the Missouri Valley Football Conference in football, and the Summit League in other sports together with NDSU, SDSU and UNO.
- Augustana College, the University of Minnesota Duluth, Minnesota State University, Mankato and St. Cloud State University were admitted to the Northern Sun Intercollegiate Conference beginning July 1, 2008.
- The University of Nebraska at Omaha joined the Mid-America Intercollegiate Athletics Association starting July 1, 2008. UNO has since moved to Division I and is now in The Summit League with many of its former conference members.
- Central Washington University and Western Washington University, both football-only affiliates of the NCC, joined up with football independents Western Oregon, Humboldt State, and Dixie State (now known as Utah Tech) and restarted football in their full-time home of the Great Northwest Athletic Conference. Central Washington has since moved their program to the Lone Star Conference, while Western Washington ceased sponsoring football after the 2008 season.

=== Chronological timeline ===
- In 1922, the North Central Conference (also known as the North Central Intercollegiate Conference) was founded with nine charter members: College of St. Thomas, Creighton University, Des Moines University, Morningside College, Nebraska Wesleyan University, North Dakota Agricultural College, University of North Dakota, South Dakota State College of Agricultural and Mechanical Arts, and the University of South Dakota. St. Thomas left after the 1922 season.
- In 1926, Des Moines University left the NCC, and the school eventually would close its doors in 1929. Nebraska Wesleyan also left, joining the Nebraska Conference. St. Thomas rejoined the conference after a brief stint as an independent.
- In 1928, Creighton University and the College of St. Thomas (now University of St. Thomas) left the NCC. St. Thomas became a full member of the Minnesota Intercollegiate Athletic Conference while Creighton left to join the Missouri Valley Conference. The NCC was left with five members.
- In 1934, Iowa State Teachers College joined the NCC from the Iowa Intercollegiate Athletic Conference. Also, Omaha University joined the NCC to bring membership back up to seven schools.
- In 1942, Augustana College left the South Dakota Intercollegiate Conference to join the North Central Conference as its eighth member.
- In 1946, Omaha University left the NCC to join the Central Intercollegiate Conference. The NCC was left with seven members.
- In 1960, North Dakota Agricultural College was renamed North Dakota State University.
- In 1961, the Iowa State Teachers College was renamed the State College of Iowa.
- In 1964, South Dakota State College was renamed South Dakota State University.
- In 1967, State College of Iowa was renamed to the University of Northern Iowa.
- In 1968, Mankato State College joined the NCC from the Northern Intercollegiate Conference, bringing league membership up to eight teams.
- In 1975, Mankato State College was renamed Mankato State University.
- In 1976, the University of Nebraska at Omaha (Omaha University was renamed to UNO in 1968) rejoined the NCC, while Mankato State University left the NCC due to not fielding a team in the 1976 season. Membership in the NCC remained at eight schools.
- In 1978, the University of Northern Colorado left the Great Plains Athletic Conference to join the North Central Conference. In the same year, the University of Northern Iowa left the NCC to move to the Association of Mid-Continent Universities. Membership remained at eight schools.
- In 1981, Mankato State University and St. Cloud State University joined the NCC from the Northern Intercollegiate Conference, giving the NCC its largest membership total in history at 10 schools and it would remain at this level for the next 21 years. Membership at this time included: Augustana, Mankato State, Morningside, Nebraska-Omaha, North Dakota, North Dakota State, Northern Colorado, South Dakota, South Dakota State, and St. Cloud State.
- In 1998, Mankato State University was officially renamed to Minnesota State University, Mankato.
- In 2002, Morningside College, one of the North Central Conference's charter members, left the league and moved out of NCAA Division II to the NAIA level. The NCC was left with nine members.
- In 2003, the University of Northern Colorado moved up to NCAA Division I, leaving the NCC with eight members.
- In 2004, charter members North Dakota State and South Dakota State also announced plans to move to Division I and leave the NCC. SDSU, NDSU and Northern Colorado founded the FCS Great West Football Conference. The University of Minnesota-Duluth left the Northern Sun Intercollegiate Conference to join the NCC as its seventh member.
- In 2006, Central Washington University and Western Washington University of the Great Northwest Athletic Conference joined the North Central Conference as affiliate members in the sport of football only to give the conference nine football schools.
- In 2008, the two remaining charter members of the NCC, the University of South Dakota and the University of North Dakota, announced plans to leave the conference and move up to Division I. This move led to the rest of the league members making a move. Central Washington and Western Washington joined up with other schools in the Pacific Northwest to form a football league in the GNAC. Augustana, Minnesota-Duluth, Minnesota State and St. Cloud State remained in NCAA Division II by joining the Northern Sun Intercollegiate Conference. Finally, Nebraska-Omaha also remained in Division II by joining the Mid-America Intercollegiate Athletics Association (MIAA) before moving to Division I a year later. These moves resulted in the dissolution of the North Central Conference after having existed for 86 years.

== Member schools ==
=== Final members ===
The NCC had seven full members in the conference's final season, one was a private school:

Institution	Location	Founded	Affiliation	Enrollment	Nickname	Joined (Note: Represents the calendar year when fall sports competition begins.)	Left (Note: Represents the calendar year when spring sports competition ends.)	Subsequent conference(s)	Current conference
Augustana University (Note: Formerly known as Augustana College until 2015.)	Sioux Falls, South Dakota	1860	Lutheran ELCA	1,650	Vikings	1941	2008	Northern Sun (NSIC) (2008–present)	
University of Minnesota–Duluth	Duluth, Minnesota	1902, 1947	Public (Note: Part of the University of Minnesota System.)	10,497	Bulldogs	2004	2008	Northern Sun (NSIC) (2008–present)	
Minnesota State University–Mankato	Mankato, Minnesota	1868	Public (Note: Part of the Minnesota State Colleges and Universities System.)	15,649	Mavericks	1968, 1981	1976, 2008	Northern Sun (NSIC) (2008–present)	
University of Nebraska–Omaha	Omaha, Nebraska	1908	Public (Note: Part of the University of Nebraska System.)	14,093	Mavericks	1934; 1976	1946; 2008	Mid-America (MIAA) (2008–11); D-I Independent (2011–12)	Summit (Note: Currently an NCAA Division I athletic conference.) (Note: Since joining NCAA Division I, Nebraska–Omaha hasn't sponsored football after dropping the sport their reclassifying move from NCAA Division II.) (2012–present)
University of North Dakota	Grand Forks, North Dakota	1883	Public (Note: Part of the North Dakota University System.)	13,817	Fighting Sioux (Note: North Dakota now competes as the Fighting Hawks since the 2015–16 school year.)	1922	2008	Great West (GWC) (2008–12); Big Sky (BSC) (2012–18)	Summit (Note: Their football team competes in the Missouri Valley Football Conference (MVFC).) (2018–present)
St. Cloud State University	St. Cloud, Minnesota	1869	Public	17,231	Huskies	1981	2008	Northern Sun (NSIC) (2008–present)	
University of South Dakota	Vermillion, South Dakota	1862	Public (Note: Part of the South Dakota Board of Regents.)	8,641	Coyotes	1922	2008	Great West (GWC) (2008–11)	Summit (2011–present)

=== Final affiliate members ===
The NCC had two affiliate members for football only in the conference's final season, both of which are public schools.

Institution	Location	Founded	Affiliation	Enrollment	Nickname	Joined (Note: Represents the calendar year when fall sports competition begins.)	Left (Note: Represents the calendar year when spring sports competition ends.)	NCC sport(s) played	Current primary conference	Current conference in former NCC sport
Central Washington University	Ellensburg, Washington	1891	Public	12,342	Wildcats	2006	2008	football	Great Northwest (GNAC) (2001–present)	Lone Star (LSC) (2022–present)
Western Washington University	Bellingham, Washington	1893	Public	16,142	Vikings	2006	2008	football	Great Northwest (GNAC) (2001–present)	Dropped sport

=== Former members ===
The NCC had nine other full members during the conference's tenure, two were private schools:

Institution	Location	Founded	Affiliation	Enrollment	Nickname	Joined (Note: Represents the calendar year when fall sports competition begins.)	Left (Note: Represents the calendar year when spring sports competition ends.)	Subsequent conference(s)	Current conference
Creighton University	Omaha, Nebraska	1878	Catholic (Jesuit)	6,716	Bluejays	1922	1928	various (Note: Creighton had joined the following subsequent conferences: the Missouri Valley Conference (Note: Currently an NCAA Division I athletic conference.) (MVC) from 1928–29 to 1947–48, and again from 1976–77 to 2012–13; and as an Independent from 1948–49 to 1975–76.)	Big East (2013–present)
Des Moines University	Des Moines, Iowa	1864	Baptist	330	Tigers	1922	1926	Independent (1926–29)	Closed in 1929
Morningside University (Note: Formerly known as Morningside College until 2021.)	Sioux City, Iowa	1894	United; Methodist	1,149	Mustangs	1922	2002	NAIA/D-II Independent (2002–03)	Great Plains (GPAC) (Note: Currently an NAIA athletic conference.) (2003–present)
Nebraska Wesleyan University	Lincoln, Nebraska	1887	United; Methodist	1,601	Prairie Wolves	1922	1926	Great Plains (GPAC) (1969–2016)	American Rivers (ARC) (Note: Currently an NCAA Division III athletic conference.) (2016–present)
North Dakota State University	Fargo, North Dakota	1890	Public (Note: Part of the North Dakota University System.)	13,229	Bison	1922	2004	D-I Independent (2004–07)	Summit (Note: Their football team competes in the Missouri Valley Football Conference (MVFC).) (2008–present)
University of Northern Colorado	Greeley, Colorado	1889	Public	12,392	Bears	1978	2003	D-I Independent (2003–06)	Big Sky (BSC) (2006–present)
University of Northern Iowa	Cedar Falls, Iowa	1876	Public	14,070	Panthers	1934	1978	D-I Independent (1978–82); Summit (1982–91)	Missouri Valley (MVC) (1991–present)
University of St. Thomas	St. Paul, Minnesota	1885	Catholic (Archdiocese of Saint Paul and Minneapolis)	10,534	Tommies	1922	1928	Minnesota (MIAC) (Note: During its time in the NCC, St. Thomas was also a dual member with the Minnesota Intercollegiate Athletic Conference (MIAC) from 1922–23 to 1927–28.) (1928–2021)	Summit (Note: Their football team competes in the Pioneer Football League (PFL).) (2021–present)
South Dakota State University	Brookings, South Dakota	1881	Public (Note: Part of the South Dakota Board of Regents.)	12,816	Jackrabbits	1922	2004	D-I Independent (2004–07)	Summit (2008–present)

=== Membership timeline ===
Full member (all sports) Full member (non-football) Associate member (football) Associate member (sport)

== Sports ==
The NCC sponsored baseball, men's and women's basketball, football, cross-country, golf, soccer, softball, swimming & diving, tennis, track & field, volleyball, and wrestling.

Six of the seven members of the NCC sponsored Division I ice hockey, and five still do. In men's hockey, after a major conference realignment that took effect in 2013, Minnesota–Duluth, Nebraska–Omaha, North Dakota, and St. Cloud State field teams in the National Collegiate Hockey Conference, while Minnesota State–Mankato is a member of the Western Collegiate Hockey Association (WCHA). Before the realignment, all of these schools had been members of the WCHA for men's hockey. All of these schools, except for Omaha, have women's teams in the WCHA (Omaha women's hockey is a club sport). The women's side of the WCHA was not affected by this realignment.

=== Conference championships ===
==== Men's basketball ====
NCC Championships Per School

School	Conference		Tournament	
School	Titles	Last Title	Titles	Last Title
South Dakota State	20	2002	2	2002
North Dakota	18	1995	3	1994
South Dakota	13	2007	2	2007
North Dakota State	10	1995	0	N/A
Northern Iowa	8	1969	0	N/A
Morningside	5	1983	0	N/A
Creighton	4	1927	0	N/A
St. Cloud State	4	2003	2	2003
Minnesota State	4	2008	1	2006
Nebraska-Omaha	4	2005	2	2008
Augustana	3	1989	0	N/A
Northern Colorado	1	1989	0	N/A

The NCC Tournament was held from 1991–1994, then it was brought back and used from 2001-2008.

NCC Regular Season Champions

Year	School
1922-23	Creighton
1923-24	Creighton
1924-25	Creighton
1925-26	Morningside
1926-27	Creighton
1927-28	North Dakota
1928-29	South Dakota State
1929-30	South Dakota
1930-31	South Dakota
1931-32	North Dakota State
1932-33	North Dakota State
1933-34	North Dakota
1934-35	North Dakota
1935-36	North Dakota
1936-37	North Dakota
1937-38	Morningside
1938-39	South Dakota
1939-40	South Dakota State; North Dakota State
1940-41	North Dakota State
1941-42	North Dakota State
1942-43	South Dakota State
1943-44	None-War
1944-45	None-War
1945-46	None-War

Year	School
1946-47	Morningside
1947-48	Northern Iowa
1948-49	Northern Iowa
1949-50	Northern Iowa
1950-51	Northern Iowa; Morningside
1951-52	North Dakota State
1952-53	Northern Iowa
1953-54	North Dakota; North Dakota State
1954-55	North Dakota
1955-56	South Dakota State
1956-57	South Dakota State; South Dakota
1957-58	South Dakota
1958-59	South Dakota State
1959-60	South Dakota State
1960-61	South Dakota State
1961-62	Northern Iowa; Augustana
1962-63	South Dakota State
1963-64	Northern Iowa
1964-65	North Dakota
1965-66	North Dakota
1966-67	North Dakota
1967-68	South Dakota State
1968-69	Northern Iowa; South Dakota State
1969-70	South Dakota State

Year	School
1970-71	North Dakota State
1971-72	South Dakota
1972-73	South Dakota State
1973-74	North Dakota
1974-75	North Dakota
1975-76	North Dakota; Minnesota State
1976-77	North Dakota
1977-78	Augustana
1978-79	Nebraska-Omaha
1979-80	South Dakota State
1980-81	North Dakota State
1981-82	North Dakota
1982-83	Morningside
1983-84	Nebraska-Omaha
1984-85	South Dakota State
1985-86	St. Cloud State
1986-87	St. Cloud State
1987-88	St. Cloud State
1988-89	Northern Colorado; Augustana
1989-90	North Dakota
1990-91	North Dakota
1991-92	South Dakota State
1992-93	South Dakota
193-94	South Dakota

Year	School
1994-95	North Dakota; North Dakota State
1995-96	South Dakota State
1996-97	South Dakota State
1997-98	South Dakota State
1998-99	South Dakota
1999-2000	South Dakota
2000-01	South Dakota
2001-02	South Dakota State
2002-03	St. Cloud State
2003-04	Nebraska-Omaha
2004-05	Nebraska-Omaha
2005-06	Minnesota State
2006-07	South Dakota; Minnesota State
2007-08	Minnesota State

NCC Tournament Champions

Year	School
1991	South Dakota State
1992	North Dakota
1993	North Dakota
1994	North Dakota
Tournament would stop in 1994 and be brought back in 2001
2001	St. Cloud State
2002	South Dakota State
2003	St. Cloud State
2004	Nebraska-Omaha
2005	South Dakota
2006	Minnesota State
2007	South Dakota
2008	Nebraska-Omaha

==== Women's basketball ====
NCC Championships Per School

School	Conference		Tournament	
School	Titles	Last Title	Titles	Last Title
North Dakota	11	2007	7	2007
North Dakota State	10	2004	0	N/A
South Dakota	5	2008	1	2008
Nebraska-Omaha	3	1982	0	N/A
South Dakota State	2	2003	0	N/A
St. Cloud State	1	1989	0	N/A
Minnesota State	1	1986	0	N/A

NCC Regular Season Champions

Year	School
1979-80	Nebraska-Omaha
1980-81	Nebraska-Omaha
1981-82	Nebraska-Omaha
1982-83	South Dakota
1983-84	South Dakota
1984-85	South Dakota
1985-86	Minnesota State
1986-87	North Dakota State
1987-88	North Dakota State
1988-89	North Dakota State; St. Cloud State

1989-90	North Dakota
1990-91	North Dakota
1991-92	North Dakota State
1992-93	North Dakota State; North Dakota
1993-94	North Dakota
1994-95	North Dakota State
1995-96	North Dakota State
1996-97	North Dakota State
1997-98	North Dakota
1998-99	North Dakota

1999-2000	North Dakota State
2000-01	North Dakota
2001-02	North Dakota
2002-03	South Dakota; South Dakota State
2003-04	North Dakota State; South Dakota State
2004-05	North Dakota
2005-06	North Dakota
2006-07	North Dakota
2007-08	South Dakota

NCC Tournament Champions

Year	School
2001	North Dakota
2002	North Dakota
2003	North Dakota
2004	North Dakota
2005	North Dakota
2006	North Dakota
2007	North Dakota
2008	South Dakota

==== Football ====
NCC Championships Per School

School	Conference	
School	Titles	Last Title
North Dakota State	26	1994
North Dakota	24	2006
South Dakota State	14	1963
Northern Iowa	12	1964
South Dakota	10	2005
Nebraska-Omaha	9	2007
Northern Colorado	5	2002
Morningside	3	1956
Creighton	2	1927
Minnesota State	2	1993
Augustana	1	1959
Minnesota-Duluth	1	2005
St. Cloud State	1	1989

NCC Champions By Year

Year	School
1922	South Dakota State
1923	Morningside
1924	South Dakota State
1925	North Dakota State; Creighton
1926	South Dakota State
1927	South Dakota; Creighton
1928	North Dakota
1929	North Dakota
1930	North Dakota
1931	North Dakota
1932	North Dakota State
1933	South Dakota State
1934	North Dakota
1935	North Dakota State
1936	North Dakota
1937	North Dakota
1938	South Dakota
1939	North Dakota; South Dakota State; South Dakota
1940	Northern Iowa
1941	Northern Iowa
1942	Northern Iowa; Augustana
1943	None-War
1944	None-War
1945	None-War

1946	Northern Iowa
1947	Northern Iowa; South Dakota
1948	Northern Iowa
1949	Northern Iowa; South Dakota State
1950	South Dakota State
1951	South Dakota
1952	Northern Iowa
1953	South Dakota State
1954	Morningside; South Dakota State
1955	South Dakota State
1956	Morningside
1957	South Dakota State
1958	North Dakota
1959	Augustana
1960	Northern Iowa
1961	Northern Iowa; South Dakota State
1962	Northern Iowa; South Dakota State
1963	South Dakota State
1964	Northern Iowa; North Dakota State; North Dakota
1965	North Dakota State
1966	North Dakota State; North Dakota

1967	North Dakota State
1968	North Dakota State
1969	North Dakota State
1970	North Dakota State
1971	North Dakota
1972	North Dakota State; North Dakota; South Dakota
1973	North Dakota State; South Dakota
1974	North Dakota State; North Dakota; South Dakota
1975	North Dakota
1976	North Dakota State
1977	North Dakota State
1978	South Dakota
1979	North Dakota
1980	Northern Colorado
1981	North Dakota State
1982	North Dakota State
1983	North Dakota State; Nebraska Omaha
1984	North Dakota State; Nebraska-Omaha
1985	North Dakota State
1986	North Dakota State
1987	Minnesota State
1988	North Dakota State
1989	St. Cloud State
1990	North Dakota State

1991	North Dakota State
1992	North Dakota State
1993	North Dakota; Minnesota State
1994	North Dakota; North Dakota State
1995	North Dakota
1996	Nebraska-Omaha
1997	Northern Colorado
1998	Northern Colorado; Nebraska-Omaha
1999	Northern Colorado; North Dakota
2000	Nebraska-Omaha
2001	North Dakota
2002	Northern Colorado
2003	North Dakota
2004	Nebraska-Omaha
2005	Minnesota-Duluth; North Dakota; Nebraska-Omaha; South Dakota
2006	Nebraska-Omaha; North Dakota
2007	Nebraska-Omaha

==== Volleyball ====
NCC Championships Per School

School	Conference	
School	Titles	Last Title
North Dakota State	11	2003
Nebraska-Omaha	8	2000
Northern Colorado	5	1995
Augustana	4	2003
Minnesota-Duluth	4	2007
South Dakota State	1	2000
North Dakota	0	N/A
St. Cloud State	0	N/A
Minnesota State	0	N/A
Morningside	0	N/A
South Dakota	0	N/A

NCC Champions By Year

Year	School
1979	Northern Colorado
1980	Northern Colorado
1981	North Dakota State
1982	North Dakota State
1983	Nebraska-Omaha
1984	Nebraska-Omaha
1985	Nebraska-Omaha
1986	Nebraska-Omaha
1987	Nebraska-Omaha
1988	North Dakota State
1989	North Dakota State
1990	North Dakota State
1991	North Dakota State
1992	North Dakota State
1993	Northern Colorado
1994	Northern Colorado
1995	Northern Colorado

1996	Augustana; Nebraska-Omaha
1997	Augustana; Nebraska-Omaha
1998	North Dakota State
1999	North Dakota State
2000	Augustana; Nebraska-Omaha; South Dakota State
2001	North Dakota State
2002	North Dakota State
2003	North Dakota State; Augustana
2004	Minnesota-Duluth
2005	Minnesota-Duluth
2006	Minnesota-Duluth
2007	Minnesota-Duluth

==== Softball ====
NCC Championships Per School

School	Conference	
School	Titles	Last Title
Nebraska-Omaha	10	2008
Augustana	9	2006
Minnesota State	4	2007
St. Cloud State	3	2004
North Dakota State	2	2002

NCC Champions By Year

Year	School
1981	Nebraska-Omaha
1982	Augustana
1983	Augustana
1984	Minnesota State
1985	Nebraska-Omaha
1986	Augustana
1987	Minnesota State
1988	Augustana
1989	Minnesota State
1990	Augustana
1991	Augustana
1992	Augustana
1993	Augustana
1994	Nebraska-Omaha
1995	Nebraska-Omaha

1996	Nebraska-Omaha
1997	Nebraska-Omaha
1998	St. Cloud State
1999	North Dakota State
2000	Nebraska-Omaha
2001	Nebraska-Omaha
2002	North Dakota State
2003	St. Cloud State
2004	St. Cloud State
2005	Nebraska-Omaha
2006	Augustana
2007	Minnesota State
2008	Nebraska-Omaha

==== Baseball ====
NCC Championships Per School

School	Conference	
School	Titles	Last Title
Minnesota State	21	2007
South Dakota State	10	1995
Northern Iowa	7	1972
Nebraska-Omaha	4	2008
Morningside	4	1980
North Dakota	2	1967
St. Cloud State	1	1991
Augustana	1	2003
Northern Colorado	1	1998

NCC Champions By Year

Year	School
1958	Northern Iowa
1959	South Dakota State
1960	Morningside
1961	Northern Iowa
1962	Northern Iowa; North Dakota
1963	Northern Iowa
1964	Morningside; Northern Iowa
1965	South Dakota State
1966	South Dakota State
1967	North Dakota
1968	Northern Iowa
1969	North Dakota State; South Dakota State

1970	Minnesota State
1971	Minnesota State
1972	Northern Iowa
1973	South Dakota State; North Dakota State
1974	Minnesota State
1975	South Dakota State
1976	Minnesota State
1977	Minnesota State
1978	Morningside
1979	Nebraska-Omaha
1980	Morningside
1981	Nebraska-Omaha
1982	Minnesota State
1983	Minnesota State
1984	South Dakota State

1985	Minnesota State
1986	Minnesota State
1987	Minnesota State
1988	Minnesota State
1989	Minnesota State
1990	Minnesota State
1991	St. Cloud State
1992	South Dakota State
1993	South Dakota State
1994	South Dakota State
1995	South Dakota State
1996	Minnesota State
1997	Minnesota State
1998	Northern Colorado
1999	Minnesota State

2000	Minnesota State
2001	Minnesota State
2002	Minnesota State
2003	Augustana
2004	North Dakota State
2005	Nebraska-Omaha
2006	Minnesota State
2007	Minnesota State
2008	Nebraska-Omaha

==== Women's soccer ====
NCC Championships Per School

School	Conference		Tournament	
School	Titles	Last Title	Titles	Last Title
Minnesota State	5	2007	1	2003
Northern Colorado	4	2001	0	N/A
Nebraska-Omaha	4	2006	4	2004

NCC Regular Season Champions By Year

Year	School
1996	Northern Colorado
1997	Northern Colorado
1998	Minnesota State
1999	Northern Colorado
2000	Minnesota State
2001	Minnesota State; Northern Colorado
2002	Nebraska-Omaha
2003	Minnesota State
2004	Nebraska-Omaha
2005	Nebraska-Omaha
2006	Nebraska-Omaha
2007	Minnesota State

NCC Tournament Champions

Year	School
2000	Nebraska-Omaha
2001	Nebraska-Omaha
2002	Nebraska-Omaha
2003	Minnesota State
2004	Nebraska-Omaha

== Associate members ==
- Football - Western Washington University, Central Washington University
- Women's Swimming and Diving - Colorado Mines, Minnesota State University Moorhead, Metro State (CO)
- Men's Swimming and Diving - Colorado Mines, Metro State (CO)
- Men's Tennis - Winona State

== Conference football stadiums ==
School	Football Stadium	Stadium capacity
Augustana	Howard Wood Field	10,000
Central Washington	Tomlinson Stadium	4,000
Minnesota Duluth	Griggs Field at James S. Malosky Stadium	4,000
Minnesota State	Blakeslee Stadium	7,500
Nebraska-Omaha	Al F. Caniglia Field	9,500
North Dakota	Alerus Center	13,500
North Dakota State	Fargodome	19,000
St. Cloud State	Husky Stadium	4,198
South Dakota	DakotaDome	10,000
South Dakota State	Coughlin-Alumni Stadium	16,000
Western Washington	Civic Stadium	5,000
