= Joe Faber Field =

Baseball stadium in St. Cloud, Minnesota, U.S.

- Interactive map of Joe Faber Field
- Location: St. Cloud, Minnesota, U.S.
- Coordinates: 45.570279°N 94.220273°W
- Owner: St. Cloud, Minnesota, U.S.
- Operator: City of St. Cloud
- Capacity: 2,000
- Surface: Grass
- Scoreboard: Yes
- Field size: Left Field: 315 ft Left Center: 401 ft Center Field: 380 ft Right Center: 375 ft Right Field: 325 ft
- Public transit: Metro Bus

Construction
- Built: 1998
- Opened: 1998
- Renovated: 2007

Tenants
- St. Cloud State Baseball (NCAA) 1998–present St. Cloud Rox (NWL) 1998–present

Joe Faber Field is a baseball venue located in St. Cloud, Minnesota, United States. It is the home of the St. Cloud Rox of the Northwoods League, a collegiate summer baseball league.

== Description ==
The park opened in 1998 and has a capacity of around 2,000. It also hosts the baseball team of St. Cloud State University, which competes in the NCAA Division II Northern Sun Intercollegiate Conference. The field is located at St. Cloud's Municipal Athletic Complex, next to Dick Putz Field, which played host to the River Bats for the 1997 season. Other amateur teams from the area also use the field throughout the year.

== MAC ==
Joe Faber Field is part of the Municipal Athletic Complex, which has two baseball fields (Dick Putz Field and Joe Faber Field), a golf course (Veterans Public Golf Course), and two hockey arenas (Torrey Arena and Ritsche Arena).
