= List of mayors of Paradise Valley =

The town of Paradise Valley, Arizona has had 18 mayors since its incorporation in 1961. From 1961 to 2012 the mayor was selected from among the members of the town council with each council member casting one vote. Since 2012 the mayor has been selected by direct voting in a general election.

No.	Name	Starting year of office	Ending year of office	Source
1	Patrick G. Downey	1961	1962	
2	Jack Huntress	1962	1972	
3	E. Roberts Tribken	1972	1975	
4	Barbara von Ammon	1975	1980	
5	J. Duncan Brock	1980	1984	
6	Joan Lincoln	1984	1986	
7	Robert Plenge	1986	1990	
8	Kent Wick	1990	1992	
9	David Hann	1992	1994	
10	Joan Horne	1994	1996	
11	Marvin Davis	1996	1998	
12	Edward Lowry	1998	2004	
13	Ron Clarke	2004	2006	
14	Ed Winkler	2006	2008	
15	Vernon Parker	2008	2010	
16	Scott LeMarr	2010	2014	
17	Michael Collins	2015	2018	
18	Jerry Bien-Willner	2019	2024	
19	Mark Stanton	2025	Incumbent	
