= St. Cloud State Huskies =

Intercollegiate sports teams of St. Cloud State University

- University: St. Cloud State University
- Nickname: Huskies
- NCAA: NCAA DII (most sports); NCAA DI (ice hockey)
- Conference: Northern Sun Intercollegiate Conference (primary); CCSA (women Nordic skiing)
- Athletic director: Holly Schreiner
- Location: St. Cloud, Minnesota
- Varsity teams: 17
- Basketball arena: Halenbeck Hall
- Ice hockey arena: Herb Brooks National Hockey Center
- Baseball stadium: Joe Faber Field
- Softball stadium: Selke Field; Husky Dome
- Soccer stadium: Husky Stadium
- Colors: Cardinal and black
- Mascot: Blizzard the Husky
- Fight song: St. Cloud State Rouser
- Website: scsuhuskies.com
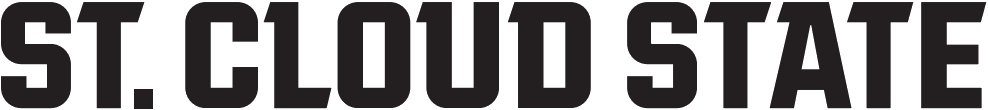

Team NCAA championships
- 5

The St. Cloud State Huskies are the athletic teams for St. Cloud State University. The university is primarily a member of the Northern Sun Intercollegiate Conference (NSIC), and currently sponsors 18 NCAA Division II teams. SCSU also sponsors a women's Nordic skiing team through membership in the CCSA, as well as men's and women's Division I ice hockey teams that are members of the National Collegiate Hockey Conference (men) and Western Collegiate Hockey Association (women). The teams go by the nickname Huskies, and the school's mascot is a husky named Blizzard.

The current interim director of athletics is Holly Schreiner.

St. Cloud State also sponsored football until 2019–20, when they decided to drop the program.

== Conferences ==
St. Cloud State was a charter member in 1932 of the Northern Intercollegiate Conference (which has since become known as the NSIC Northern Sun Intercollegiate Conference. The NSIC was affiliated with NAIA National Association of Intercollegiate Athletics until 1995, the conference then joined NCAA Division II. St. Cloud State competed as a member of the North Central Conference at the NCAA Division II level from 1982 to 2008. The North Central Conference disbanded at the end of the 2007–08 academic year, and St. Cloud State once again became members of the Northern Sun Intercollegiate Conference in 2008–09.

== Sports ==
The St. Cloud Athletic Department sponsors the following intercollegiate sports:

Men's sports	Women's sports
Baseball	Softball
Basketball	Basketball
Ice hockey	Ice hockey
Soccer	Soccer
Swimming & diving	Swimming & diving
Wrestling	Cross country
	Nordic skiing
	Tennis
	Track & field^{†}
	Volleyball
† – Track and field includes both indoor and outdoor.

=== Ice hockey ===
The St. Cloud State men's hockey program made the move to the NCAA Division I level in 1987–88, and it joined the Western Collegiate Hockey Association (WCHA) in 1990–91. The Huskies men's team have played in the National Collegiate Hockey Conference (NCHC) since the 2013–2014 season. The women's hockey team, which began its first season of intercollegiate competition in 1998–1999, remain members of the WCHA. The Huskies hockey teams play all of their home games in the Herb Brooks National Hockey Center (5,371 capacity), which was opened on December 16, 1989.

=== Wrestling ===
With one of the best wrestling programs in Division II year after year, the Huskies have won the NCAA Wrestling Championship in 2015, 2016, 2018, and 2019, placing second in 2017, 2013, 2012 and 2011.

Huskie Head Wrestling coach is Steve Costanzo who will begin his 14th season as head coach at St. Cloud State in 2019–20. He is the 13th coach in the history of the St. Cloud State University wrestling program, which dates back to 1949–50.

== Facilities ==
The main athletic facilities at St. Cloud State University include Husky Stadium (football and soccer), Halenbeck Hall (indoor track and field, swimming and diving, volleyball, wrestling and basketball), the Herb Brooks National Hockey Center (ice hockey) and Selke Field (softball). Baseball is played off-campus at a City of St. Cloud ballpark called Joe Faber Field.

=== Herb Brooks National Hockey Center ===
As of 2009, St. Cloud State was working on a $29.3 million renovation of its National Hockey Center. The Minnesota Legislature has funded $6.5 million of that total, with the balance to come from fundraising. The two-phase construction project, the first phase of which is completed, has transformed the building into the Herb Brooks National Hockey Center, expanding a predominantly hockey-only facility into a multi-purpose event center. Among the renovations are expanded luxury suites, a new main entrance, and improvements to the ticketing, administration, university store, concourses, restrooms and concession areas. The school is currently working on the second phase of fundraising for the renovations

== Athletic alumni ==
Van Nelson, United States Track and Field Olympian, competed in Cross Country and Track and Field for St. Cloud State University from 1964 to 1969. Along with Chuck Spoden and Kenny Mitchell, Nelson founded the first SCSU cross country team. His freshman year he qualified for the national meet and finished 8th. While at St. Cloud State, Nelson set a new collegiate record of 13:45.8 for 3 miles in Sioux Falls, SD. Van was a three-year, double gold medal winner at the Drake Relays and twice won the Drake Relays Outstanding Athlete Award. Nelson still holds the SCSU records for the 5,000m, 10,000m, 15,000m, 20,000m and 30,000m runs. Van qualified to represent the United States at the 1968 Mexico City Olympic Games. Going into the games Van was ranked 4th in the world in the 5,000m and 8th in the 10,000m.

Former St. Cloud State football player Todd Bouman was a veteran quarterback in the NFL. He played for the Minnesota Vikings, New Orleans Saints, Green Bay Packers, Jacksonville Jaguars, Baltimore Ravens, and finished his career with a second stint with the Jacksonville Jaguars in 2010. Other former St. Cloud State players to play in the NFL include Keith Nord (Minnesota), Ben Nelson (Minnesota), Jeff Hazuga (Minnesota), John Kimbrough (Buffalo, New England and Oakland). Others have played professionally in arena football such as SCSU All American Ben Nelson and Fred Williams. Some in overseas football leagues such as two time SCSU All American Jack Moro, in the Austrian Football League, and SCSU Hall of Fame inductee Stacy Jameson, in the Italian Football League.

SCSU has had several men's basketball players go on to professional careers in the NBA or overseas leagues. St. Cloud State women's basketball player (Erika Quigley) was named the NCAA Division II Player of the Year in 2007. Diver Nate Jimmerson won the NCAA Division II men's one- and three-meter diving titles in 2008. Former St. Cloud State athlete Mary Ahlin won the NCAA Division II titles in women's one- and three-meter diving in 1998 and 1999, while Sarah Loquai won the NCAA Division II women's one-meter diving in 1997. In 2004, the St. Cloud State softball team placed third in the nation at the NCAA Division II softball championships. Former St. Cloud State women's ice hockey player Jessica Kresa is now a professional wrestler under the name ODB.

Garrett Bender plays rugby for the United States rugby sevens national team.

=== Ice hockey ===
A total of 24 former St. Cloud State ice hockey players have gone on to play professionally in the NHL. Hockey Hall of Famer Frank Brimsek played for the Huskies in 1933-34 before going on to a sterling professional career with the Boston Bruins and Chicago from 1938 to 1950. He helped the Boston Bruins win two Stanley Cup titles and he is a member of both the international and United States Hockey Hall of Fames.

Other former St. Cloud State players to skate in the NHL include Sam LoPresti, Len Esau, Steve Martinson, Tyler Arnason, Casey Borer, Tim Conboy, Matt Cullen, Jeff Finger, Bret Hedican, Joe Jensen, Fred Knipscheer, Ryan Malone, Joe Motzko, Mark Parrish, Duvie Westcott, Mark Hartigan, Andreas Nodl, Nate Raduns, Matt Hendricks, Andrew Gordon, Oliver Lauridsen, Ben Hanowski, Drew LeBlanc Ryan Poehling, Jimmy Schuldt, and Blake Lizotte. In recent years, Matt Cullen and Bret Hedican helped the Carolina Hurricanes win the Stanley Cup in 2006, while Mark Hartigan and Joe Motzko won the Stanley Cup in 2007 with the Anaheim Ducks. Hartigan was later a member of the Detroit Red Wings during their Stanley Cup championship season in 2008.
