= List of historic properties in Paradise Valley, Arizona =

- Town
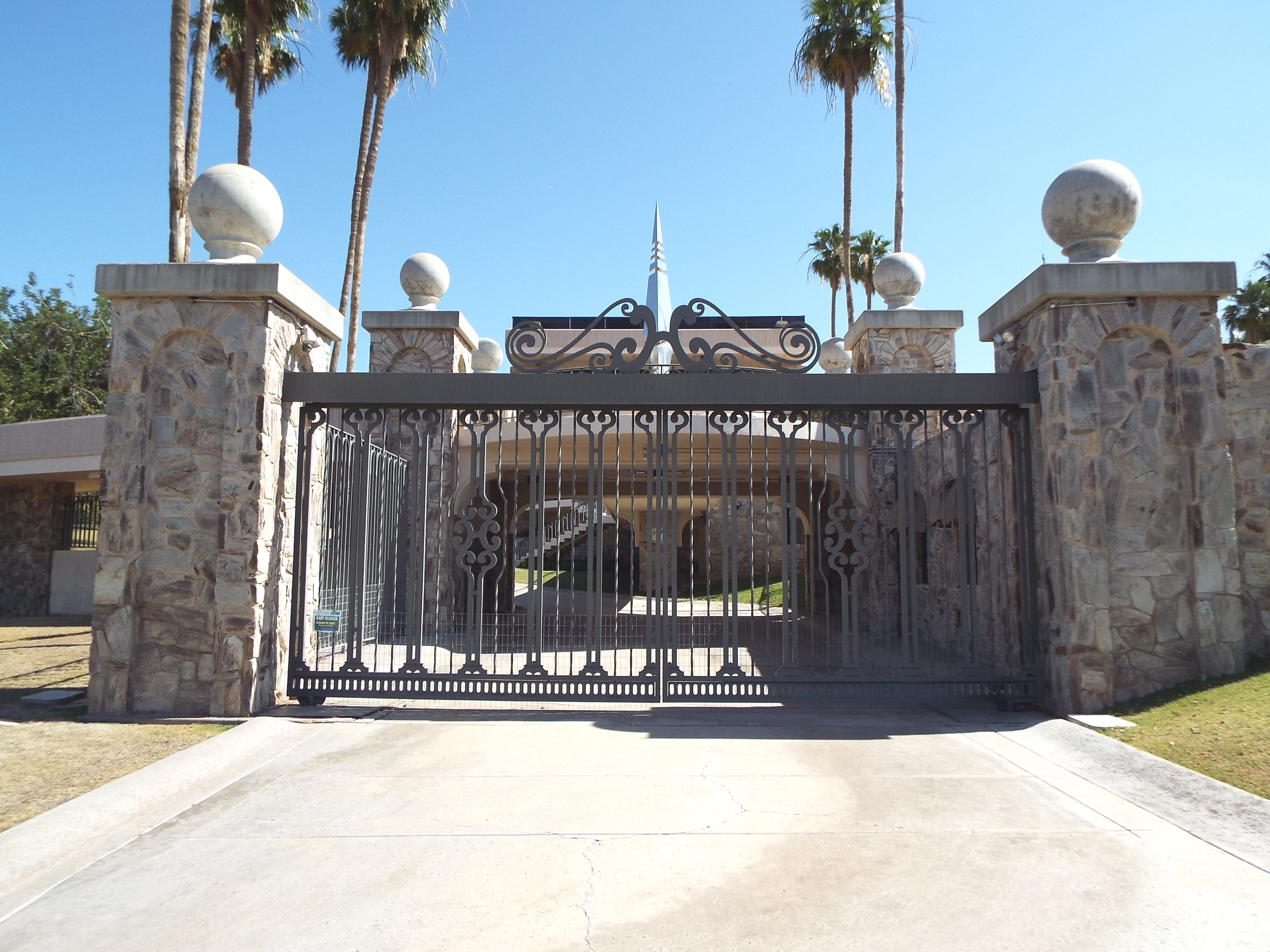
- The McCune Mansion/Hormel Mansion

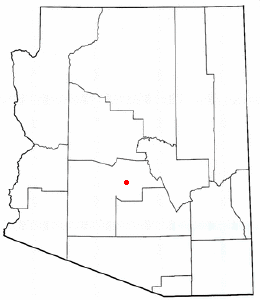
- Location in Maricopa County and the state of Arizona

This is a list of historic properties in Paradise Valley, Arizona, which includes a photographic gallery of some of the city's historic structures and monuments. Also, included is The Goldwater Crypt in the Memorial Garden on the grounds of the Christ Church of the Ascension.

== Brief history ==
The land which is now named Paradise Valley began as an agricultural community. According to Will Barnes, author of "Arizona Place Names", Frank Conkey gave the place its name in the 1880s. Conkey managed the surveyors in charge of developing the land into agricultural lots for the Rio Verde Canal Company.

After World War II, the area began to experience a population growth. The new residents founded the "Citizens Committee for the Incorporation of The Town of Paradise Valley, Arizona". After the committee presented a petition to the Maricopa County Board of Supervisor for the recognition of township, the petition was granted and on May 24, 1961, the town of Paradise Valley was incorporated.

The first and currently (as of 2016) only property in Paradise Valley to be listed in the National Register of Historic Places is the Edward L. Jones House which was built in 1925. According to the National Register of Historic Places Registration Form, Edward L.Jones had retired to Arizona with his wife, May, and three sons in 1930 from Oklahoma, where he had been in the oil business, homesteaded in the Cave Creek/Carefree area. He and his wife were attracted to the area just south of MacDonald Drive and bought about fifty desert acres from Edward Loomis Bowes, who had settled in Arizona from Evanston, Illinois, for his wife's health, in 1920, in what would in the future be incorporated as the town of Paradise Valley.

In 1964, Arizona Senator Barry Goldwater ran unsuccessfully for the Presidency of the United States. Goldwater had a house built atop of Scorpion Hill in 1952. The house, which was constructed with sandstone from the Navajo Reservation, is located on Keim Street, just east of 40th Street in Paradise Valley. His ashes and those of his wife, Peggy, who died in 1985, are interred in the "Goldwater crypt" in the Memorial Garden on the grounds of the Christ Church of the Ascension. The church is located at 4015 E. Lincoln Drive.

Two houses designed by Frank Lloyd Wright are located in Paradise Valley; they are the Harold C. Price Sr. House and the last house that Wright designed before his death, the Norman Lykes House. The Harold C. Price Sr. House was built in 1956 and is located at 7211 N. Tatum. Price was the owner of the Price Tower in Bartlesville, Oklahoma, designed by Frank Lloyd Wright. The construction of the Norman Lykes House began in 1959 and competed in 1967. It is located at 6836 N. 36th Street in Paradise Valley, Arizona. The house was finished by Taliesin Associated Architects John Rattenbury. Norman Lykes was one of seven brothers who operated the “Lykes Brothers Steamship Lines”, a shipping company which dates back to 1889.

The historic Paradise Valley Methodist Church was built in 1960 and is located at 4455 East Lincoln Road. The church's chapel with its stained glass window was built in 1964. Both are featured in the "Valley of the Sun", television program about Phoenix and its surrounding areas in the 1960s.

Bil Keane and his wife Thelma a.k.a. "Thel" lived in Paradise Valley. Their house is located at 5815 E. Joshua Tree Ln. Bil is the creator of the daily newspaper panel The Family Circus which premiered on February 29, 1960. His wife Thelma, was the inspiration and model for the "Mommy" character in his long running comic strip and was instrumental in restoring the copyrights for The Family Circus to her husband.

The McCune Mansion/Hormel Mansion was built in 1967 and is located at 6112 N. Paradise View Drive atop Sugar Loaf Mountain. The house was built for Pennzoil heir Walter McCune who died sometime before the house was complete in the early 70's. Barry Goldwater and Alice Cooper lived on the same block. It was later sold to Hormel Food Co. heir George Hormel. At 52,000 square feet, it is the 13th largest privately owned home in the United States by square footage.

== Historic structures ==
Historic house, churches and monuments in Paradise Valley, Arizona.
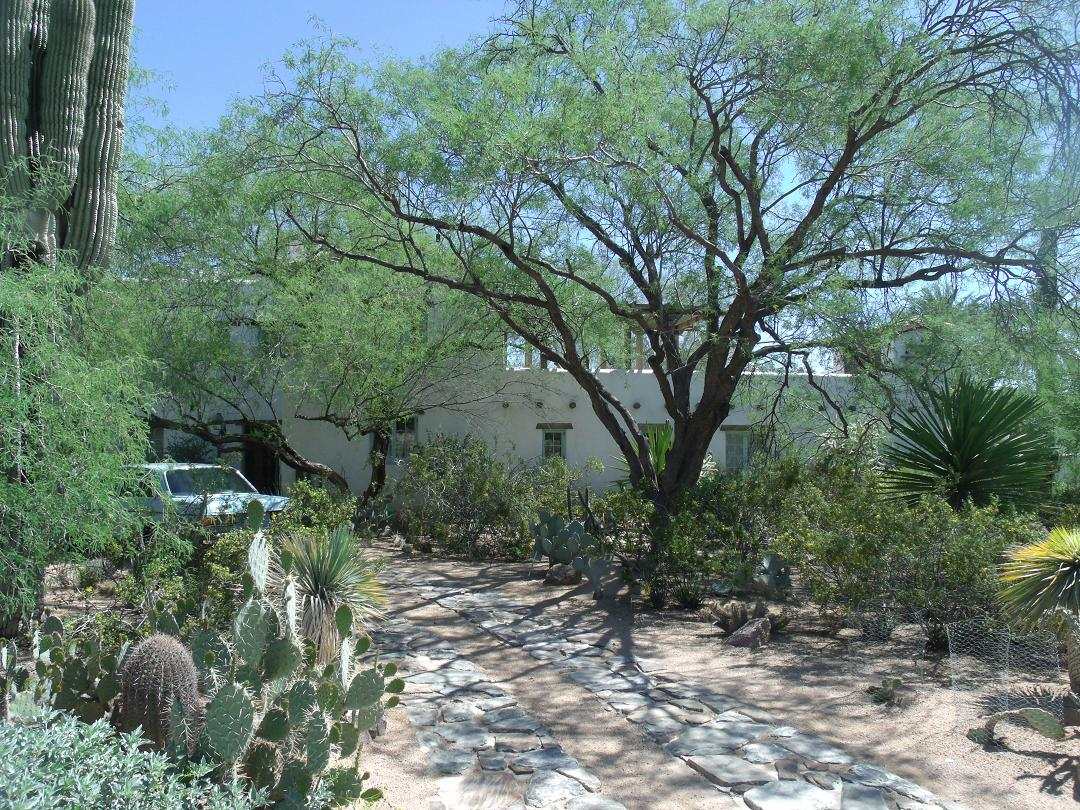
The Edward L. Jones House was built in 1925 and is located at 5555 N. Casa Blanca Dr. The house was listed in the National Register of Historic Places on December 13, 1996; reference #96001474.

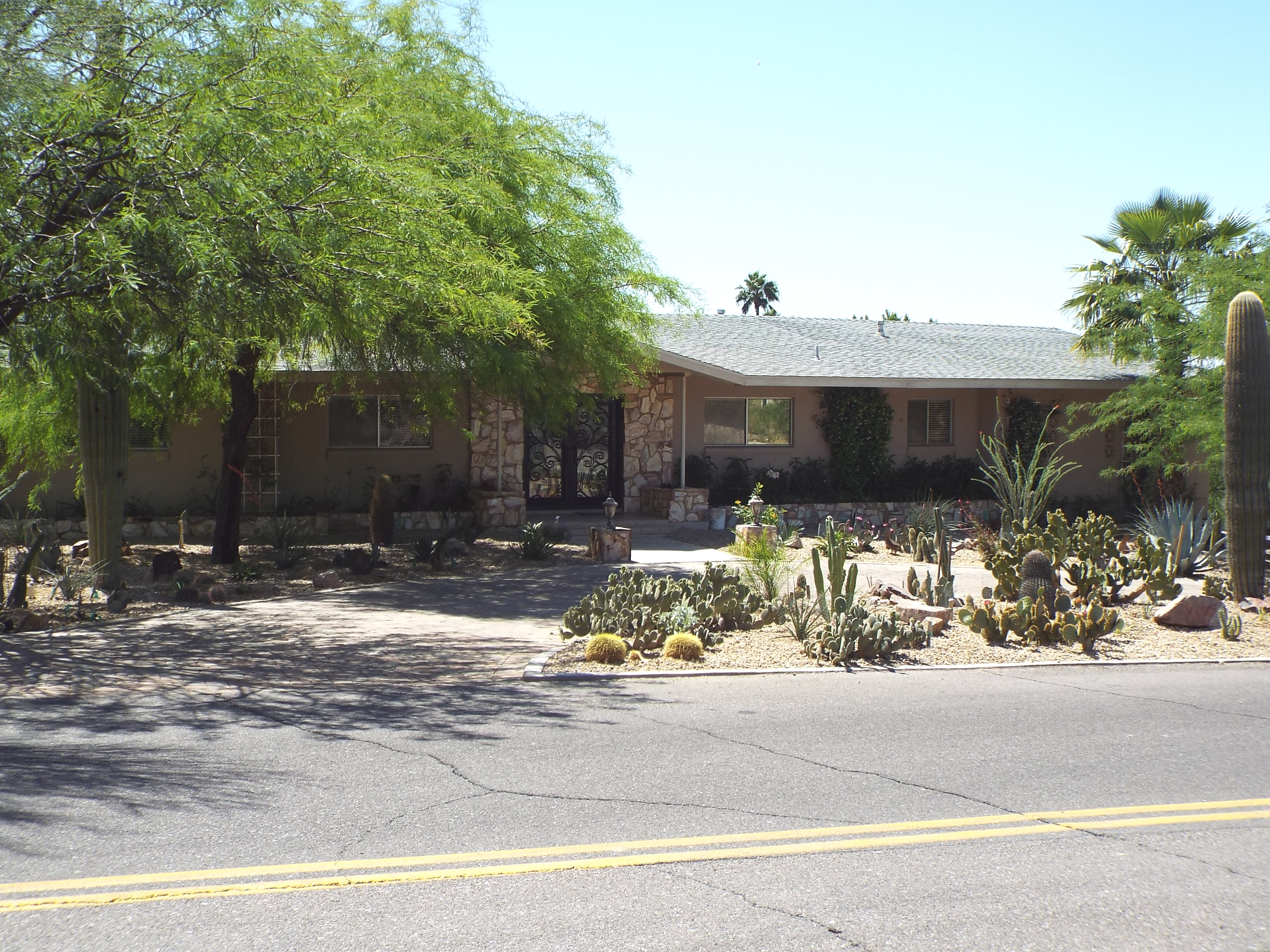
The Goldwater House a.k.a. Be-nun-i-kin (Navajo for house on top of hill).

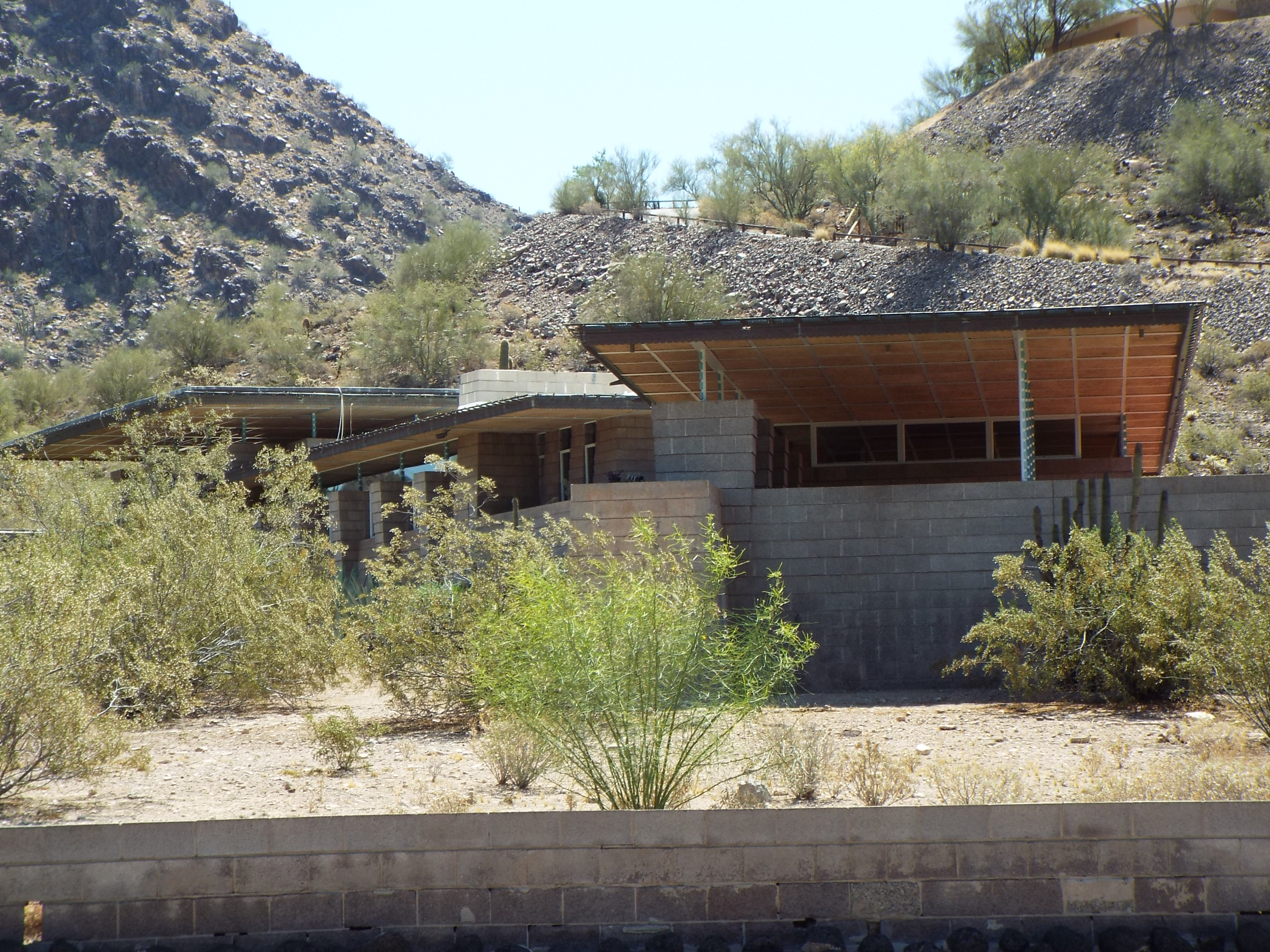
The Harold C. Price Sr. House.

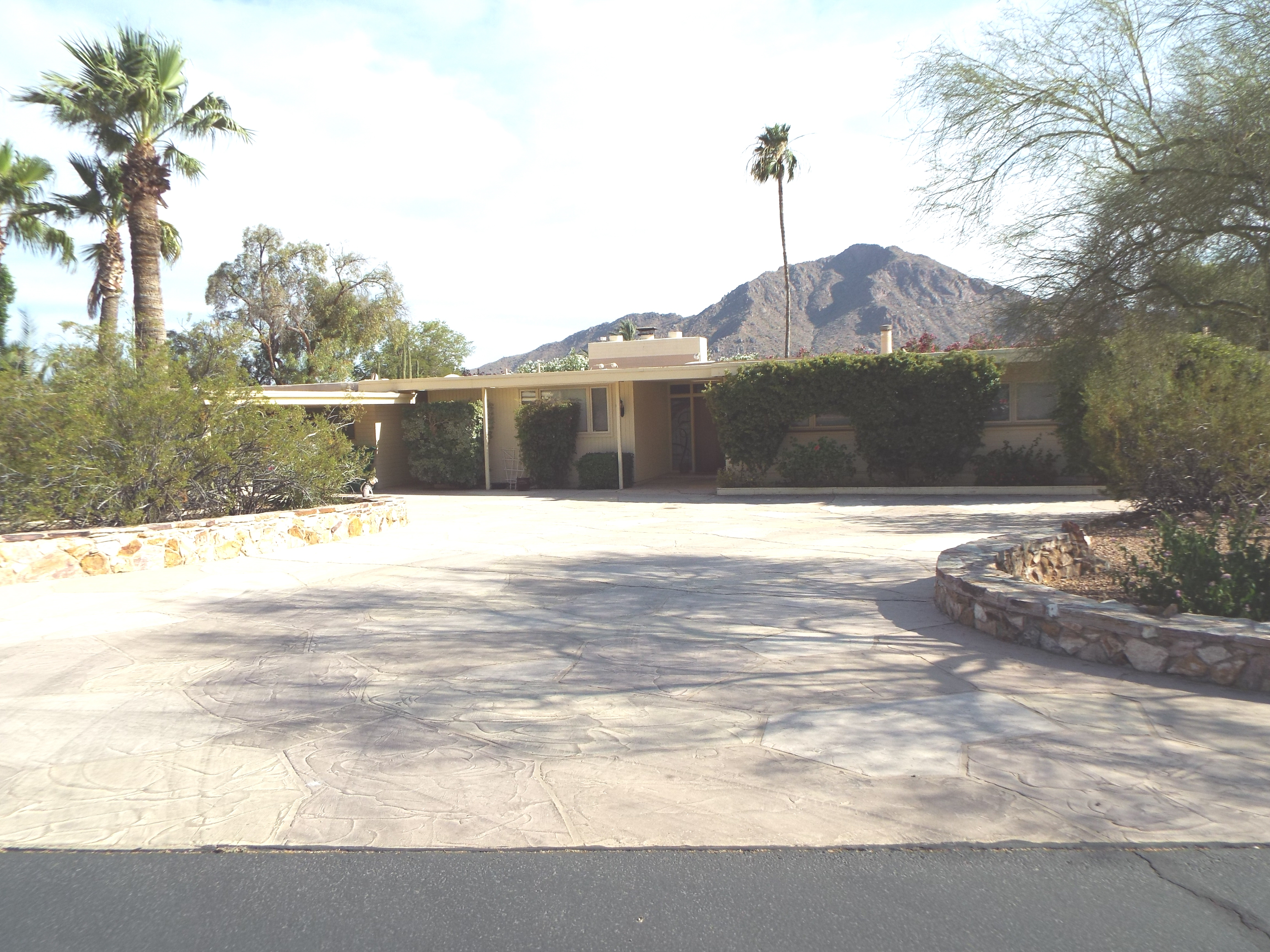
The Bil Keane and Thelma Keane House.

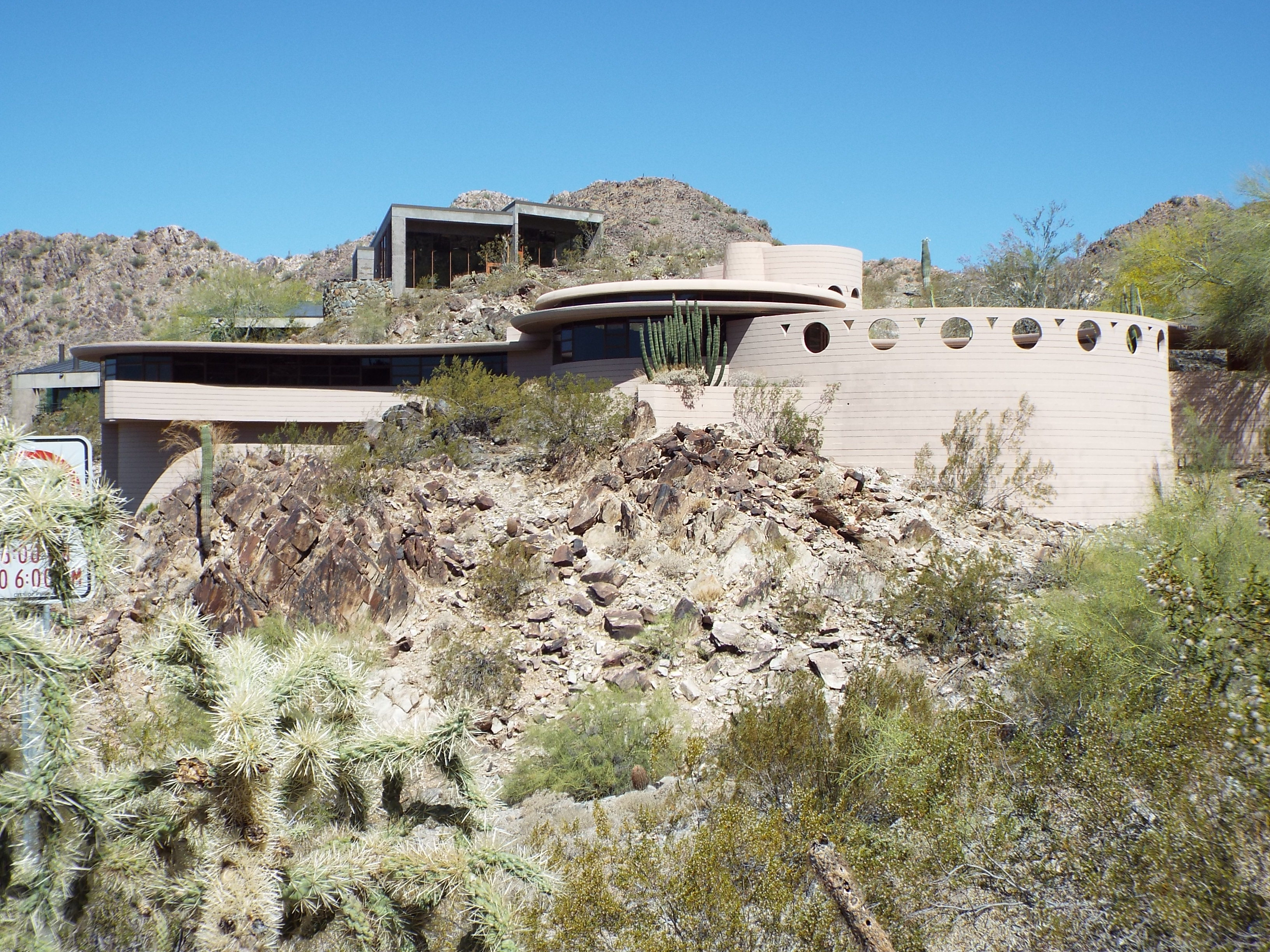
The Norman Lykes House.

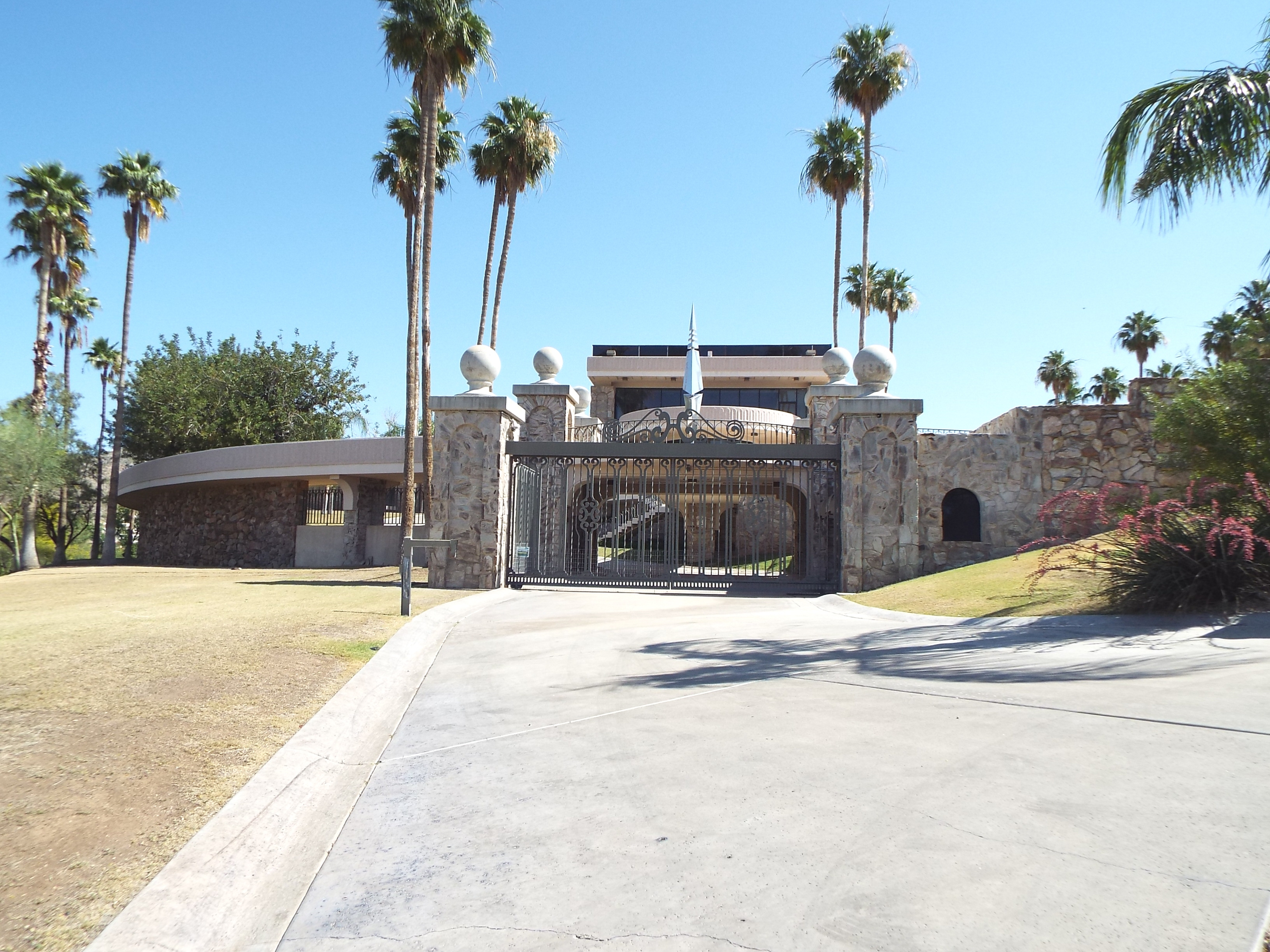
The McCune Mansion/Hormel Mansion.

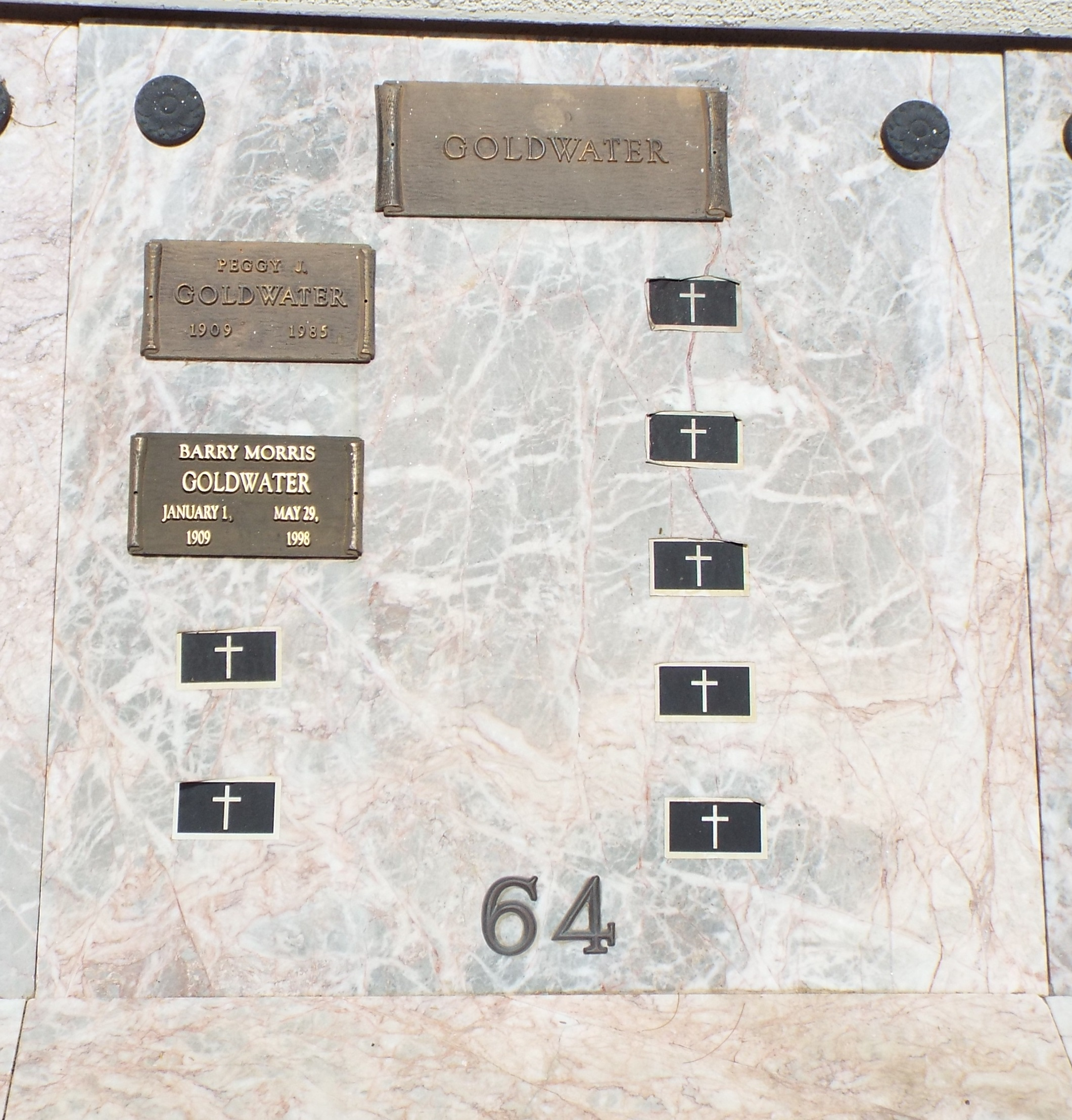
The Goldwater Crypt in the Memorial Garden on the grounds of the Christ Church of the Ascension.

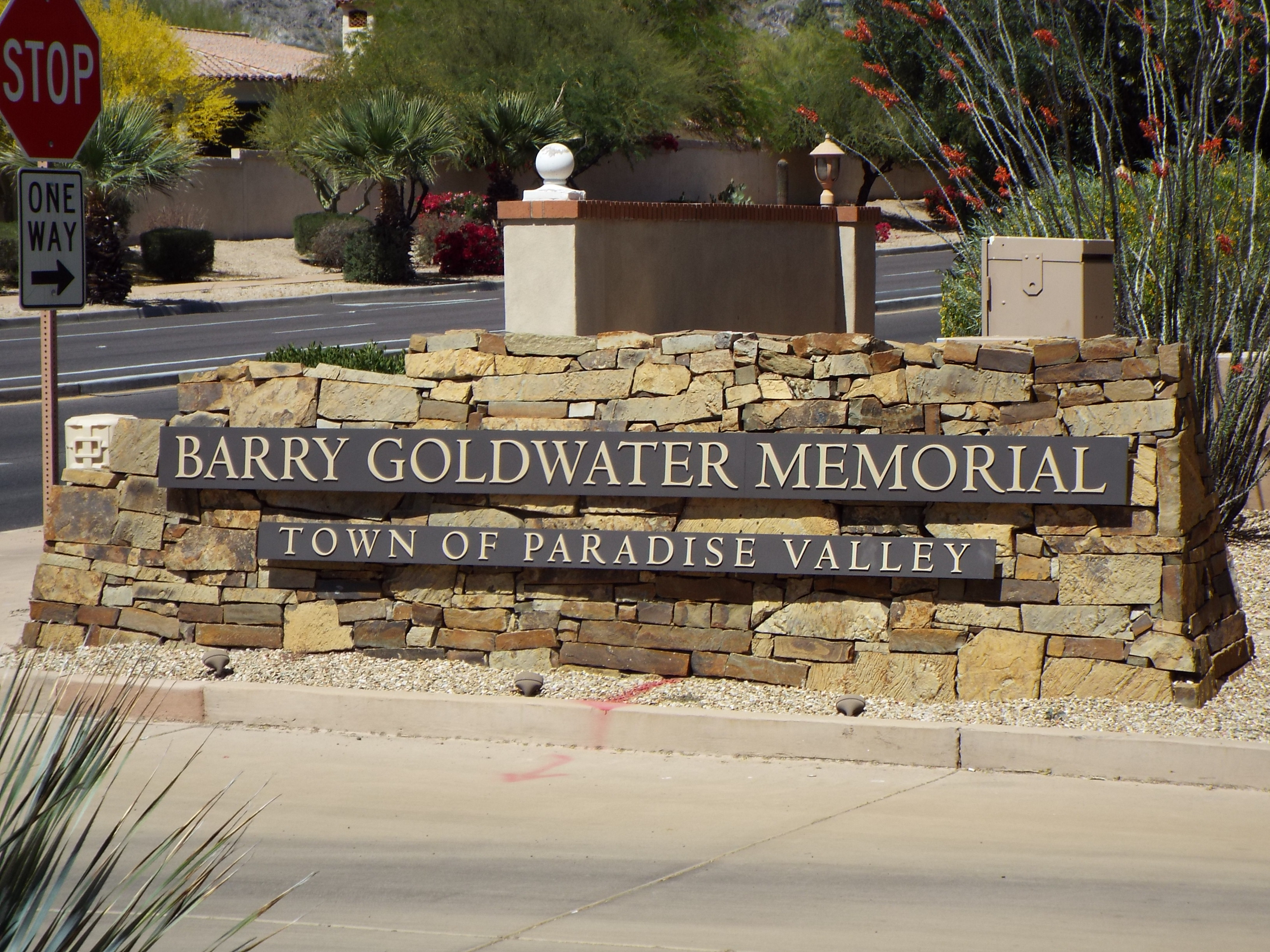
The Barry Goldwater Memorial Park.

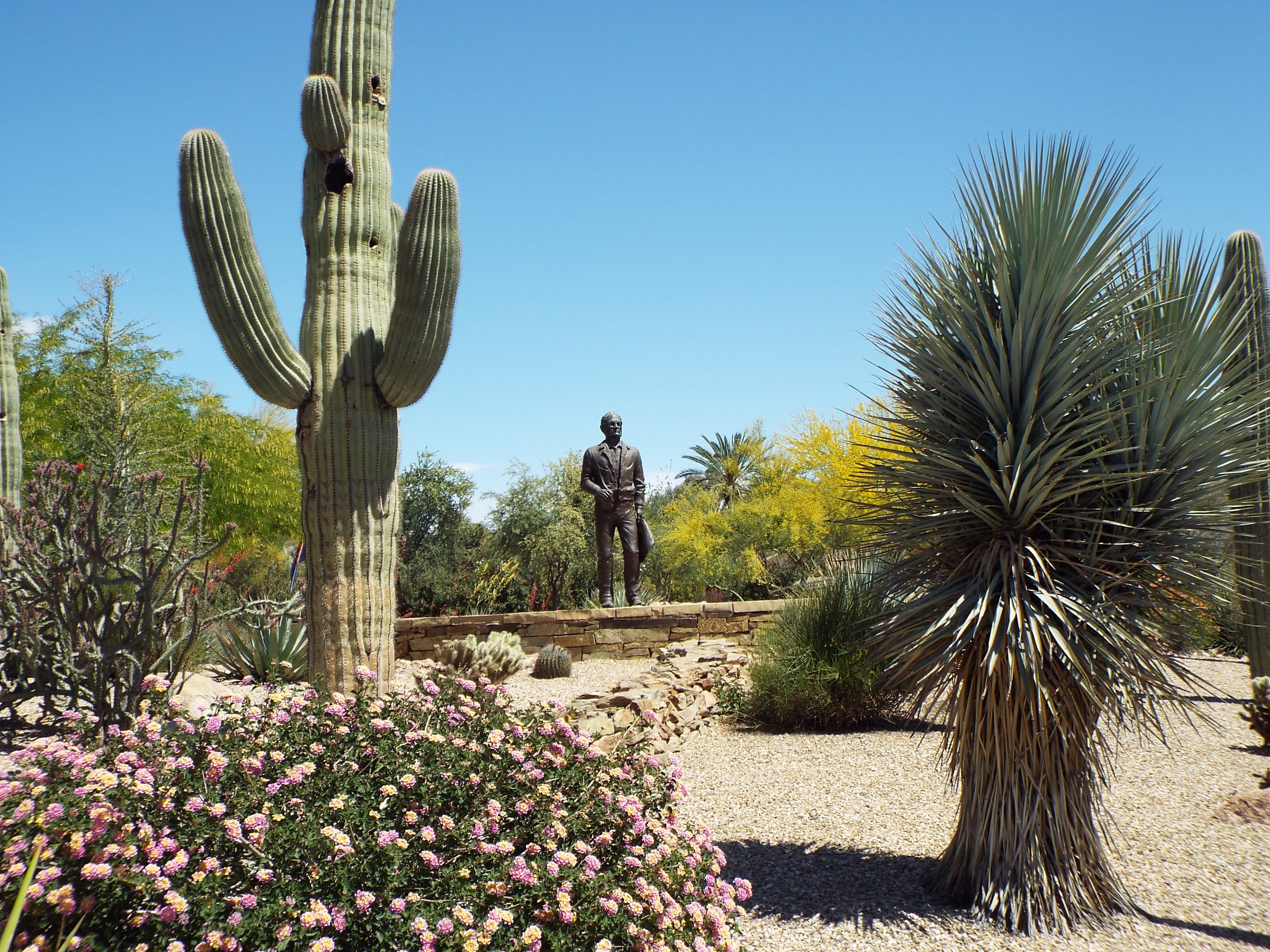
The Barry Goldwater Memorial Park. The park which is dedicated to the memory of Senator Barry Goldwater is located in 6401 N. Tatum Blvd.

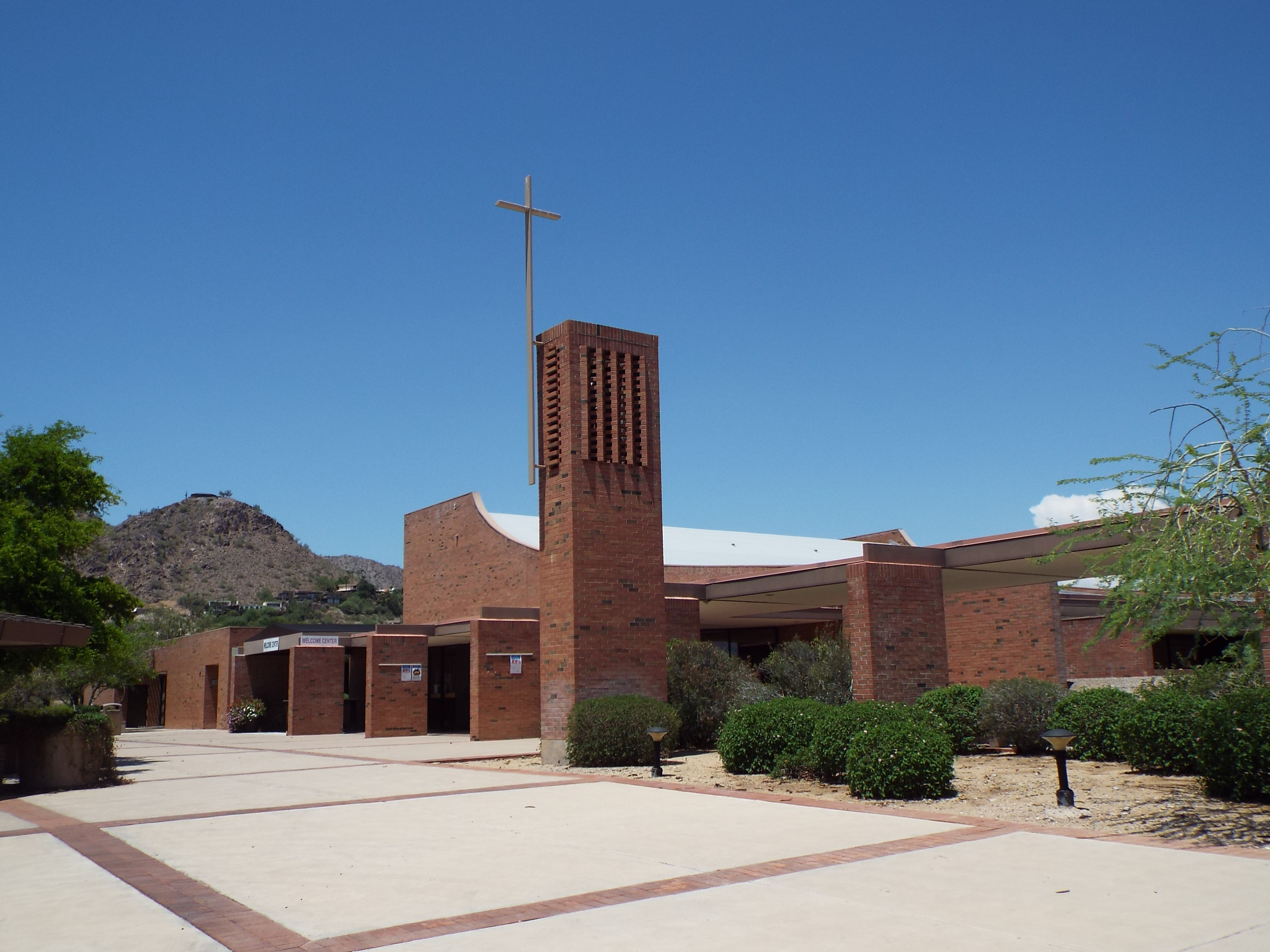
Historic Paradise Valley Methodist Church built in 1960 and located at 4455 East Lincoln Road in Paradise Valley, Arizona.

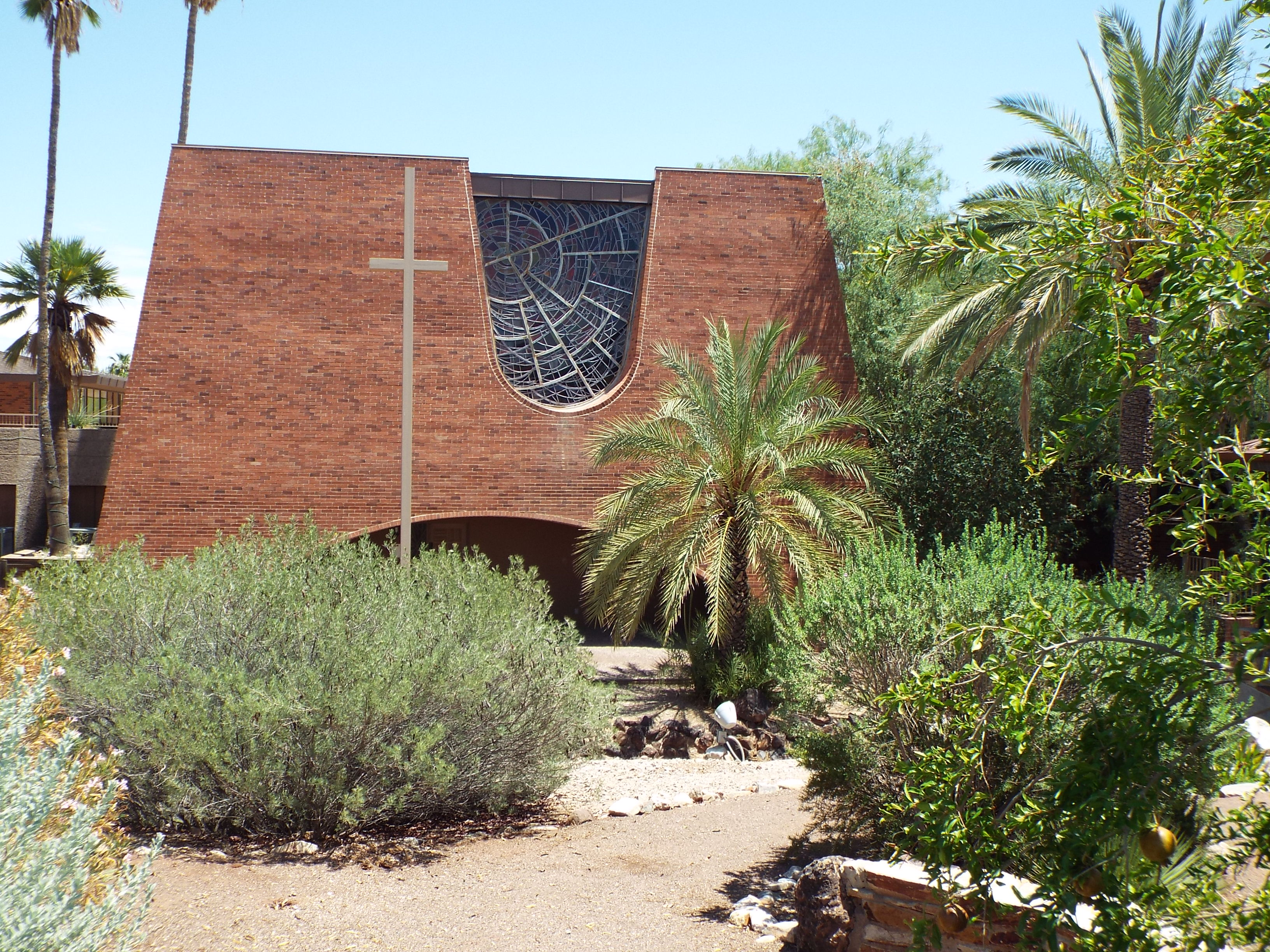
Paradise Valley Methodist Church Chapel built in 1964.

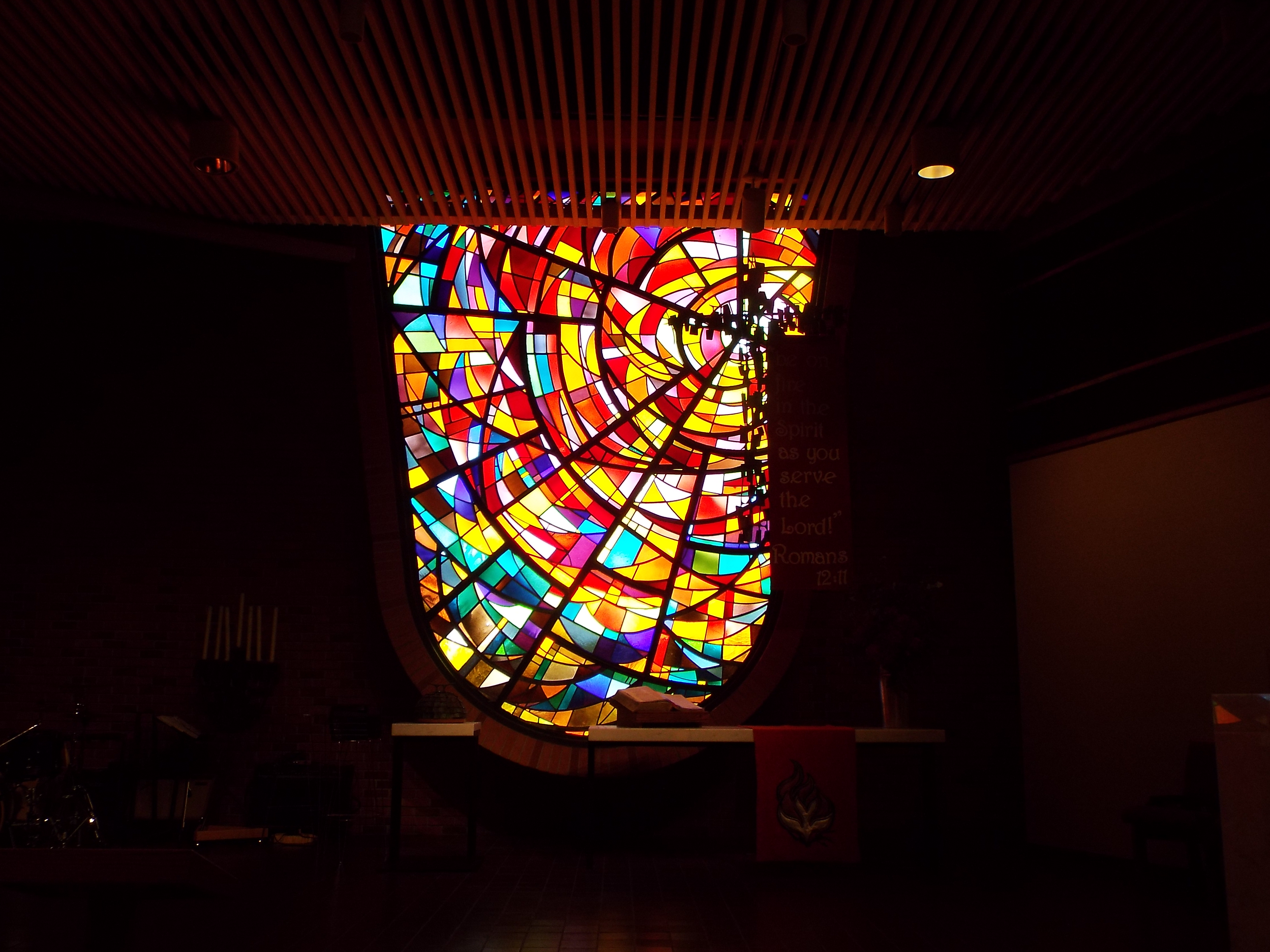
Paradise Valley Methodist Church Chapel stained glass.

== See also ==
- List of National Historic Landmarks in Arizona
- National Register of Historic Places listings in Arizona
- National Register of Historic Places listings in Maricopa County, Arizona
