= Paradise Valley, Arizona =

Town in Maricopa County, Arizona

- Town
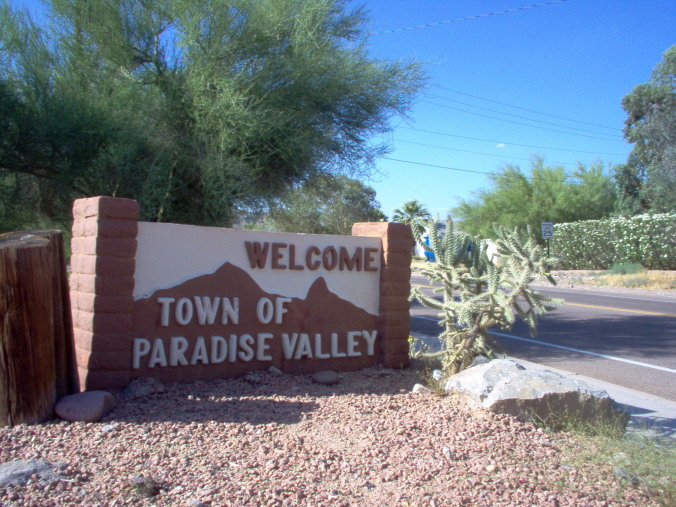
- Welcome sign

- Flag Seal
- Motto: "There is a reason we call this valley 'paradise'"
- Location in Maricopa County, Arizona

- Location within Maricopa County, Arizona Location within Arizona Location within the United States
- Coordinates: 33°31′52″N 111°56′34″W
- Country: United States
- State: Arizona
- County: Maricopa

Government
  - Mayor: Mark Stanton
  - Vice Mayor: Christine LaBelle

Area
  - Total: 15.41 sq mi (39.90 km^{2})
  - Land: 15.38 sq mi (39.83 km^{2})
  - Water: 0.027 sq mi (0.07 km^{2})
- Elevation: 1,854 ft (565 m)

Population (2020)
  - Total: 12,658
  - Density: 823.0/sq mi (317.77/km^{2})
- Time zone: UTC-7 (MST (no DST))
- ZIP code: 85253
- Area code: 480
- FIPS code: 04-52930
- GNIS feature ID: 2413114
- Website: www.paradisevalleyaz.gov

Paradise Valley is a suburb of Phoenix. The town is known for its golf courses, resorts and restaurants, the workshop of Paolo Soleri, and adjacency to Scottsdale and Phoenix. According to the 2020 census, its population was 12,658.

The town's name comes from the expansive area known as Paradise Valley that spreads from north of the Phoenix Mountains to Cave Creek and Carefree on the north and the McDowell Mountains to the east. Resident children in the majority of the municipality attend schools in the Scottsdale Unified School District.

== Government ==
Mark Stanton is the current mayor of Paradise Valley. He was a member of the town council for over 10 years. Stanton is also the current president and CEO of the Scottsdale Area Chamber of Commerce. Stanton is continuing his second term as mayor in January 2027. He is preceded by Jerry Bien-Willner, first elected in 2018, who served three consecutive mayoral terms.

The council has six members, who are elected to serve four-year staggered terms. Serving on the council is voluntary and uncompensated. The members discuss various topics at meetings including land use changes, policing strategies (e.g. photo enforcement technology), and capital projects. Members are able to work full time as well as be an active council member. Elections are nonpartisan, which means that ballots do not list the political party affiliations of candidates.

The mayor and six town council members are the elected representatives of the Town of Paradise Valley. The council selects its vice mayor from among its members.

The Town's accredited police department is led by Chief Freeman Carney.

In the March 2010, voters passed a proposition that enabled the direct election of the mayor by a vote of 1,617 to 1,434. Under a direct election system, the mayor is elected by voters. For all of the town's prior history, the mayor was selected by council members. In 2012, citizens gathered 500 petition signatures requesting that the council reconsider the issue of direct election. The petition stated the following:

We reside in the Town of Paradise Valley. Having just witnessed the first ever direct election of Mayor, we are convinced that it is not in the best interest of the Town. If the vitriol and the influence of special interests that we witnessed in the just-completed mayoral election are indications of things to come, we believe the Town would be better served by returning to the system which served the Town well for almost 50 years. We ask that the Town Council put before the voters at the next available election that the Mayor be chosen by the Town Council as was done in years past.

In June 2012, the council voted to place the question of direct election on the ballot again. Residents voted to keep direct election of the mayor.

Paradise Valley is in the 1st Congressional District, which has been represented by David Schweikert since 2021. Despite the town's conservative lean, at the state level it has been represented by three Democrats since 2020. A part of Legislative District 28, it is represented by Christine Marsh in the State Senate and by Kelli Butler and Aaron Lieberman in the House of Representatives.

=== General Plan ===
Arizona state law requires that all of its municipalities adopt a General Plan pursuant to A.R.S. § 9-461.05. Also known as comprehensive planning, general plans state the long-term development needs and priorities of an area. Among several community values listed in its 2022 General Plan, Paradise Valley included its support of limited government and its goal of maintaining its primarily one-acre residential character.

Its 2022 Plan introduces various policy goals aimed at protecting its built character and demographic profile. One such example is:

CC&H 5.1 - The Town shall require a minimum of one acre per residence and encourage the preservation of lots in excess of one acre in all areas of Town except where otherwise allowed by the Zoning Code or on Special Use Permit resort properties which may have higher density residential.

Relatedly, the General Plan also conveys an aversion to short-term rentals:

CC&H 5.4 - To the extent allowed by law, the Town shall continue to address trends that undermine neighborhood safety and residential character, including the adverse impacts of short term rentals in the community.

ln 2022, 65.6% of the land area was allocated to "low density residential" use, which allows one single-family house per acre. Significantly less land area, 2.9%, was set aside for "medium density residential" use. Medium density residential areas allow up to 4.5 single-family houses per acre. As of 2022, there were clusters of medium density residential areas mapped on the fringes of Paradise Valley. This density grade was also mapped along Lincoln Drive roughly bound by Camelback Manor Drive to the west and 59th Place to the east.

As of 2022, there was slightly more private open space (at 6.6%) than public open space (at 4.8%). The green space belonging the Paradise Valley Country Club is an example of private open space, whereas to the south the approximately one-acre Barry Goldwater Memorial is considered public open space. The Town of Paradise Valley cites its commitment to "ensuring limited government and services" as reason for its limited public park and open spaces.

== History ==
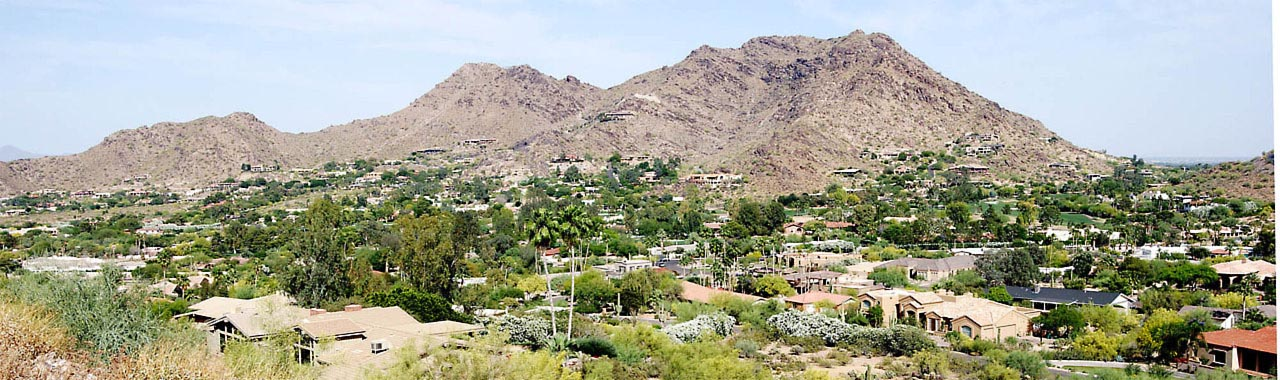
Paradise Valley, looking east to Mummy Mountain

The town's current location has been inhabited since pre-Columbian times by pre-industrial agrarian societies. After settlement by European immigrants, the land was used for cattle grazing. In the 1880s, the Rio Verde Canal Company and its manager Frank Conkey surveyed the land so it could be developed into agricultural lots. These surveyors first used the name "Paradise Valley". The name may have been chosen due to the abundance of spring wildflowers and palo verde trees. Mainly an agricultural area during the 1800s and the first half of the 1900s, the area began to be settled after World War II, on large one-to-five-acre (4,000 to 20,200 m^{2}) lots for which it became known.

As the neighboring settlements of Phoenix and Scottsdale began to grow and annex adjoining areas, the residents of what would become Paradise Valley became concerned that their community's quality of sustainability would be lost if the area was absorbed into one of its larger neighbors. These residents formed the Citizens Committee for the Incorporation of The Town of Paradise Valley, Arizona. The committee circulated a petition which collected enough signatures to qualify for presentation to the Maricopa County Board of Supervisors. The board granted the petition, which allowed for the town of Paradise Valley to be incorporated on May 24, 1961.

Today, Paradise Valley is one of the city of Phoenix's wealthiest suburbs.

== Geography ==
According to the United States Census Bureau, the town has an area of 15.4 square miles (40 km^{2}), of which 0.03 square miles (0.08 km^{2}), or 0.18%, is water.

Mummy Mountain dominates Paradise Valley's central terrain. Other landmarks include Camelback Mountain on the southern border and the Piestewa Peak mountainous area on the western border.

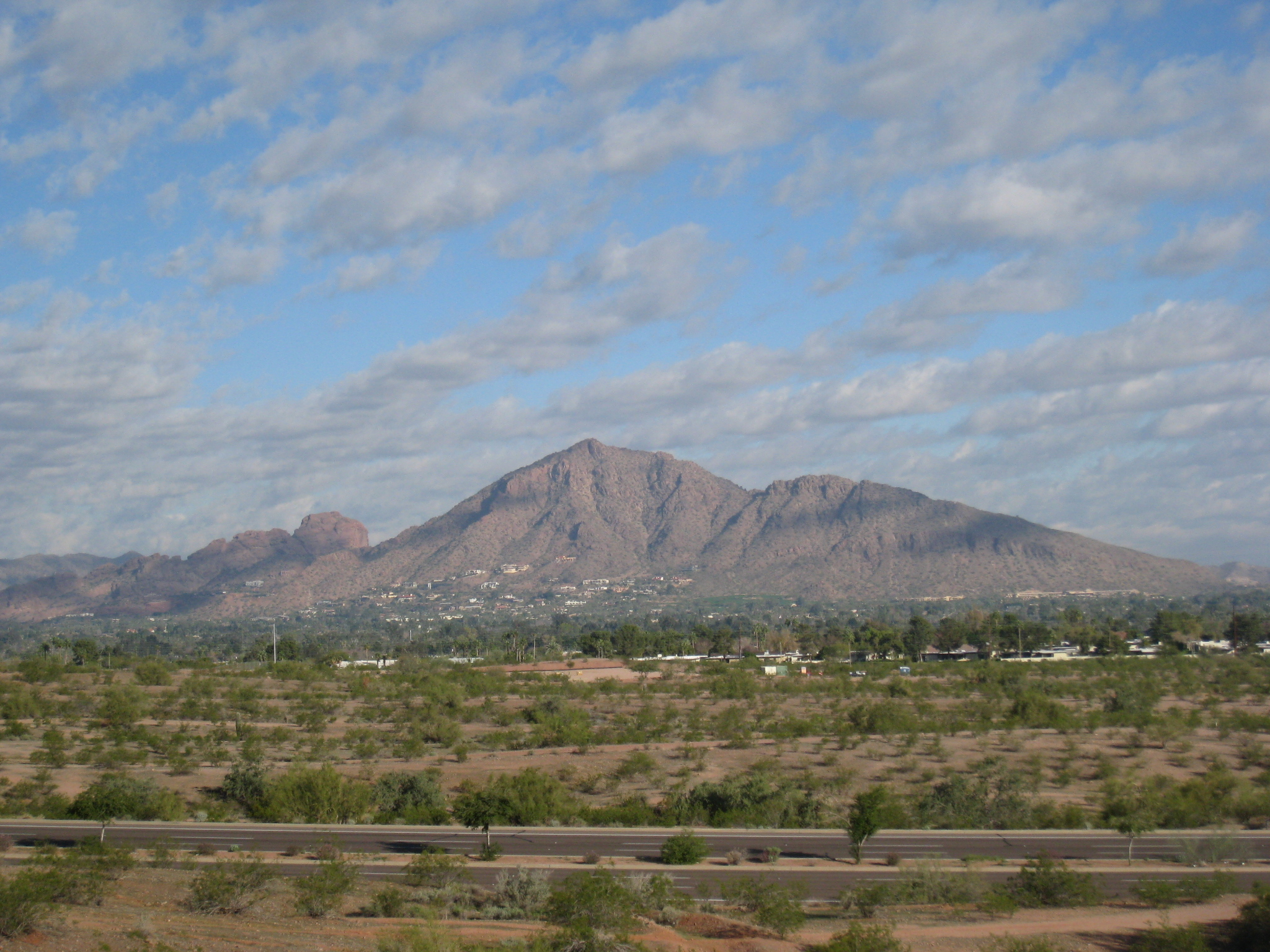
Camelback Mountain

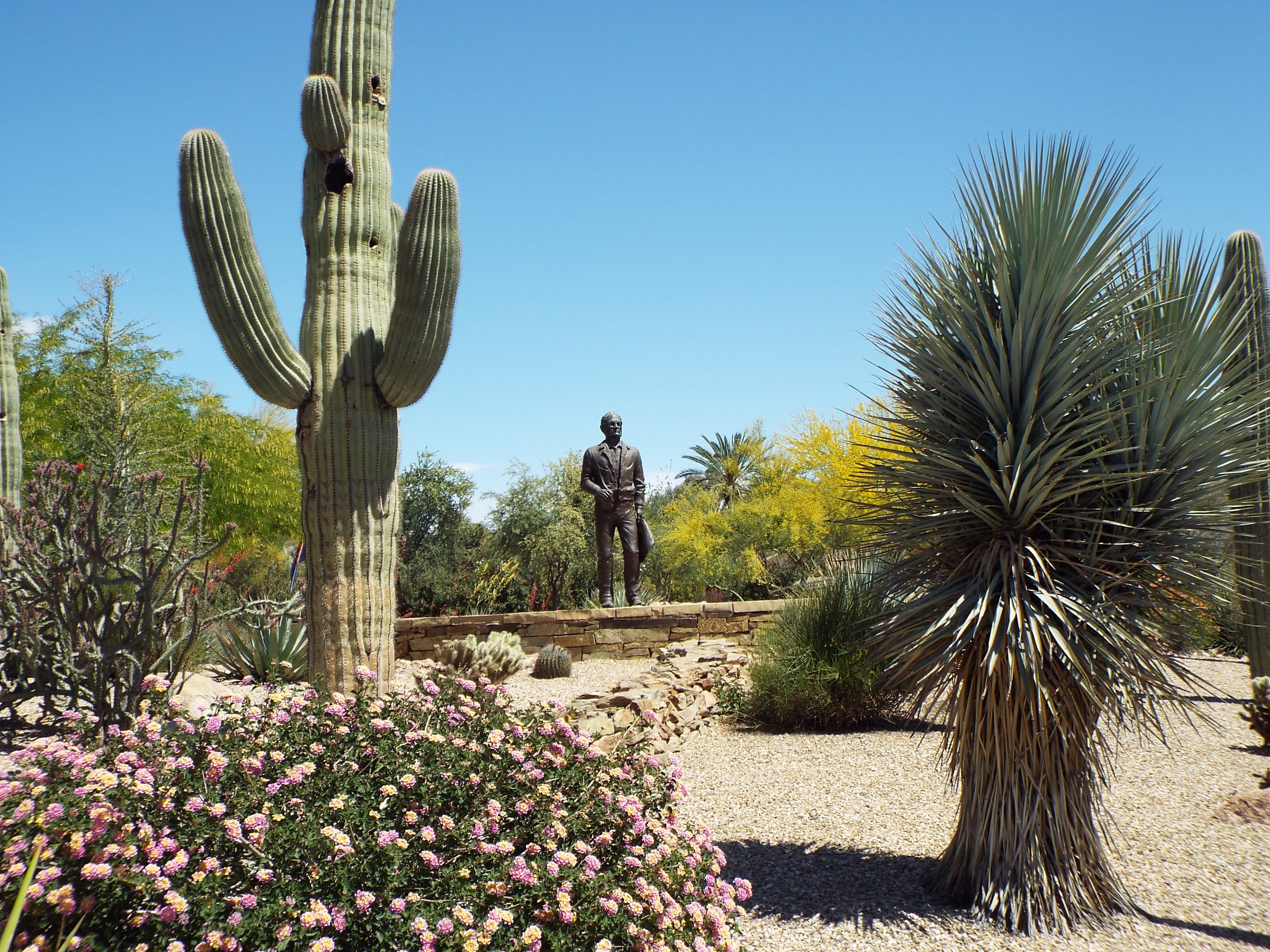
Barry Goldwater Memorial

Several historical sites are within the town, including the Harold C. Price, Sr. House, McCune Mansion/Hormel Mansion, and Barry Goldwater Memorial Park.

== Demographics ==
Historical population
Census	Pop.	Note	%±
1970	6,637		—
1980	11,085		67.0%
1990	11,773		6.2%
2000	13,664		16.1%
2010	12,820		−6.2%
2020	12,658		−1.3%
U.S. Decennial Census

=== 2020 census ===
As of the 2020 census, Paradise Valley had a population of 12,658. The median age was 53.7 years. 18.7% of residents were under the age of 18 and 29.2% of residents were 65 years of age or older. For every 100 females there were 98.2 males, and for every 100 females age 18 and over there were 98.4 males age 18 and over.

100.0% of residents lived in urban areas, while 0.0% lived in rural areas.

There were 4,752 households in Paradise Valley, of which 27.4% had children under the age of 18 living in them. Of all households, 72.8% were married-couple households, 10.1% were households with a male householder and no spouse or partner present, and 13.4% were households with a female householder and no spouse or partner present. About 15.0% of all households were made up of individuals and 9.2% had someone living alone who was 65 years of age or older.

There were 5,728 housing units, of which 17.0% were vacant. The homeowner vacancy rate was 2.9% and the rental vacancy rate was 23.2%.

Racial composition as of the 2020 census
Race	Number	Percent
White	10,497	82.9%
Black or African American	91	0.7%
American Indian and Alaska Native	27	0.2%
Asian	979	7.7%
Native Hawaiian and Other Pacific Islander	8	0.1%
Some other race	151	1.2%
Two or more races	905	7.1%
Hispanic or Latino (of any race)	693	5.5%

=== 2000 census ===
As of the 2000 census, the population density was 881.7 inhabitants per square mile (340.4/km^{2}). The 5,499 housing units averaged 354.8 per square mile (137.0/km^{2}). The racial makeup of the town was 95.6% White, 0.7% Black or African American, 0.2% Native American, 2.0% Asian, <0.1% Pacific Islander, 0.4% from other races, and 1.0% from two or more races. About 2.7% of the population was Hispanic or Latino of any race.

Of the 5,034 households, 33.3% had children under the age of 18 living with them, 76.1% were married couples living together, 4.3% had a female householder with no husband present, and 17.3% were not families; 13.6% of all households were made up of individuals, and 6.9% had someone living alone who was 65 years of age or older. The average household size was 2.71 and the average family size was 2.98.

In the town, the population was distributed as 24.9% under the age of 18, 4.0% from 18 to 24, 18.8% from 25 to 44, 35.9% from 45 to 64, and 16.4% who were 65 years of age or older. The median age was 46 years. For every 100 females, there were 98.7 males. For every 100 females age 18 and over, there were 96.1 males.

The median income for a household in the town was $150,228, and for a family was $164,811. Males had a median income of $100,000 versus $52,302 for females. The per capita income for the town was $81,290. About 1.9% of families and 2.5% of the population were below the poverty line, including 1.5% of those under age 18 and 2.8% of those age 65 or over.

=== Income and poverty ===
In 2012, the Forbes magazine named Paradise Valley's zip code, 85253, the 71st-most expensive in the United States. This ranking also makes it the most expensive in the state of Arizona. In February 2024, Business Insider highlighted how the city was seeing a notable increase in the number of wealthy transplants from California. The Wall Street Journal described this trend a year earlier.

== Education ==
Most of Paradise Valley is within the Scottsdale Unified School District. A small portion is served by Creighton Elementary School District and Phoenix Union High School District.

Several charter schools also are in the area including nearby Great Hearts Academies, BASIS Schools, and private schools such as Phoenix Country Day School.

== Economy ==
=== Top employers ===
In 2020, the top five employers were part of the hospitality industry. According to Paradise Valley's 2023 Annual Comprehensive Financial Report, the top ten employers in the town as of 2020 were:

#	Employer	# of Employees
1	Omni Scottsdale Resort and Spa	331
2	Sanctuary on Camelback	324
3	The Scottsdale Plaza Resort	283
4	Hermosa Inn	202
5	Mountain Shadows	190
6	Double Tree Paradise Valley Resort	160
7	Phoenix Country Day School	145
8	Town of Paradise Valley	109
9	Camelback Inn	97
10	Early Learning Childhood Center	82

== Confusion with other Paradise Valley designations ==
The town is not to be confused with Paradise Valley Village, an official municipal designation, in northeast Phoenix. For instance, Paradise Valley Community College, Paradise Valley High School, Paradise Valley Mall, Paradise Valley Golf Course, and the former Paradise Valley Hospital are all several miles north of the town, in Phoenix. The Paradise Valley Unified School District does not serve the town of Paradise Valley either, only the areas north of it; its boundaries end a few miles north of the border.

== Notable people ==
- Michael Bidwill, businessman, prosecutor, and football executive; he is the principal owner, chairman, and president of the Arizona Cardinals
- Charles Boyer, Franco-American actor
- Alice Cooper, shock rock singer and co-founder of Alice Cooper's Solid Rock Foundation
- Sheryl Cooper, dancer, dance instructor, and choreographer, and co-founder of Alice Cooper's Solid Rock Foundation
- Doug Ducey, politician and businessman, governor of Arizona
- Barry Goldwater, U.S. senator and 1964 Republican presidential nominee
- Jay Grdina, businessman and former pornographic actor
- Bil Keane, cartoonist, creator of The Family Circus
- Kliff Kingsbury, Arizona Cardinals head coach
- Brooks Lennon, soccer player who represented the United States national team
- G. Gordon Liddy, Watergate scandal figure and Nixon appointee
- Leslie Nielsen, Canadian-American actor
- Sandra Day O'Connor, former justice of the US Supreme Court
- Michael Phelps, former competitive swimmer and the most successful and most decorated Olympian of all time, with a total of 28 medals
- Dan Quayle, Vice President of the United States (1989–1993), U.S. senator from Indiana (1981–1989), and representative of Indiana's 4th congressional district (1977–1981)
- William Rehnquist, former Chief Justice of the US Supreme Court

== See also ==
- List of historic properties in Paradise Valley, Arizona
- Saint Barnabas on the Desert
