= Dick Putz Field =

Baseball stadium in St. Cloud, Minnesota, U.S.

- Interactive map of Dick Putz Field
- Location: St. Cloud, Minnesota, USA
- Coordinates: 45.570298°N 94.220273°W
- Owner: St. Cloud, Minnesota
- Operator: City of St. Cloud
- Capacity: 2,200
- Surface: Grass
- Scoreboard: Yes
- Field size: Left Field: 323 ft Center Field: 380 ft Right Field: 323 ft

Construction
- Built: 1971
- Opened: 1971

Tenants
- St Cloud Rox (Class C) (1971); St. Cloud Rox (NWL) (1997–2007)

Dick Putz Field is a stadium in St. Cloud, Minnesota. It is primarily used for baseball, and is the former home of the St. Cloud Rox of the defunct Class C Northern League as well as the St. Cloud River Bats collegiate league baseball team, who currently play at Joe Faber Field. It was built in 1971 and holds 2,200 people. Dick Putz Field, along with Joe Faber Field, co-hosts the Minnesota State High School League Class AA state baseball tournament.

The field was named for Dick Putz, a St. Cloud sports official, athletic booster, and radio host, in 1988.

== MAC ==
Dick Putz Field is part of the Municipal Athletic Complex, which has two baseball Fields (Dick Putz Field and Joe Faber Field), a golf course (Veterans Public Golf Course), and two Hockey Arenas (Torrey Arena and Ritsche Arena).
