= Sanctuary on Camelback Mountain =

Resort and spa in Maricopa County, Arizona

Coordinates: 33.65223°N 111.9596°W

- Founded: 1957
- Headquarters: 5700 East McDonald Dr. Paradise Valley, AZ 85253
- Key people: Allen + Philp Architects, (architects); Judith Testani, (interior design)
- Website: www.sanctuaryaz.com

Sanctuary on Camelback Mountain is a privately owned resort and spa located in Paradise Valley, Arizona. The resort, which opened in 2001, is located on 53 acres on the north face of Camelback Mountain. It has 105 mountain and spa casitas as well as a collection of private homes.

Sanctuary includes an desert-inspired spa, the Elements restaurant, and the Jade Bar. Elements former Executive Chef Beau MacMillan has been featured on several Food Network Channel shows, including Iron Chef, Worst Cooks in America, and The Next Iron Chef. Jade Bar underwent a $2 million renovation in the summer of 2013 and reopened in October.

In 2015, the resort renovated a group of its guestrooms and re-introduced them as a new room category called the Camelback Casitas and Suites. Outdoor dining is available year-round on the elements dining deck, and a private dining room, XII, is open to the kitchen.

== History ==
The property originally opened in 1957 as the Paradise Valley Racquet Club, before its owners, actor John Ireland, actress Joanne Dru, Sydney Chaplin, and tennis legend Don Budge, sold the property to Russell Jackson and William O’Brien. Russell Jackson’s son, Vick Jackson, recruited tennis star John Gardiner as a consultant in 1967.

The Paradise Valley Racquet Club was renovated and renamed John Gardiner’s Tennis Ranch in 1970. Now both a resort and membership club, the property featured 41 casitas, 12 casas, and 21 tennis courts. John Gardiner’s Tennis Ranch started an annual Senator’s Cup, which included matches between Democratic and Republican senators with all the proceeds going to Hospice of the Valley. Gardiner sold his share in the resort in 1993. The resort had several different names before opening as Sanctuary on Camelback Mountain in 2001.
