= Husky Stadium (St. Cloud) =

Multipurpose stadium in St. Cloud, Minnesota

- Location in Minnesota Location in the United States
- Address: 1111 4rd Avenue South
- Location: St. Cloud, Minnesota, U.S.
- Coordinates: 45.547687°N 94.150794°W
- Owner: St. Cloud State University
- Operator: St. Cloud State University
- Capacity: 4,400
- Surface: Omni-Grass Turf
- Record attendance: 4,500 (November, 2005)

Construction
- Opened: August, 2004

Tenants
- St. Cloud State Huskies Football (2004–2019); Soccer, and Softball (2004–present)

Husky Stadium is a 4,400-seat multipurpose stadium located in St. Cloud, Minnesota. It was built in 2004 and is the home of the St. Cloud State University Huskies soccer teams. It was home to the university's football team from 2004 until 2019 when the program was cut. The stadium is also used for high school football and soccer games. Also, St. Cloud State University uses the stadium for intramural sports, such as football and Soccer. It was built on the location of old Husky Stadium.

During the winter, an inflatable dome covers the field, allowing the stadium to be used for indoor softball. The Dome is the largest inflatable dome in a five-state history. The stadium's press box features three radio booths as well as a television booth.
