= Timeline of the Joe Biden presidency (2024 Q2) =

The following is a timeline of the presidency of Joe Biden during the second quarter of 2024, from April 1 to June 30, 2024. For a complete itinerary of his travels, see List of presidential trips made by Joe Biden (2024–25). To navigate between quarters, see timeline of the Joe Biden presidency. For the Q3 timeline see timeline of the Joe Biden presidency (2024 Q3).

== Timeline ==
=== April 2024 ===
Date	Events	Photos/videos
Monday, April 1	President Biden and First Lady Jill Biden host the White House Easter Egg Roll.	President Biden and First Lady Jill Biden attend the White House Easter Egg Roll
Tuesday, April 2	President Biden releases a statement denouncing Israel after seven World Central Kitchen aid workers were killed by Israeli drone strikes in the Gaza Strip, adding that he will "continue to press Israel" to provide aid to Palestinian civilians amid the ongoing humanitarian crisis.; President Biden wins the primaries in Connecticut, New York, Rhode Island, and Wisconsin.	
Wednesday, April 3		
Thursday, April 4	President Biden welcomes archbishop Elpidophoros of the Greek Orthodox Archdiocese of America to the White House for a celebration of Greek Independence Day, commemorating the 203rd anniversary of the end of the Greek War of Independence.	President Biden and Archbishop Elpidophoros
Friday, April 5	President Biden visits the site of the Francis Scott Key Bridge collapse in Baltimore. He repeated his intention for the federal government to cover the cost of rebuilding the bridge, asking Congress to authorize the repairs.	President Biden speaking at the Francis Scott Key Bridge collapse, joined by Governor Wes Moore, Lt. Governor Aruna Miller, and Secretary Pete Buttigieg.
Saturday, April 6		
Sunday, April 7		
Monday, April 8	Japanese Prime Minister Fumio Kishida, accompanied by his wife Yuko Kishida, begins a four-day state visit to the US, the fifth during the Biden presidency.; The National Association of Intercollegiate Athletics votes to bar transgender women athletes from competing on women’s sports teams ahead of controversial Title IX regulation changes the Biden administration.	
Tuesday, April 9		
Wednesday, April 10	President Biden holds a bilateral meeting and joint press conference with Japanese Prime Minister Fumio Kishida at the White House.; President Biden and First Lady Jill Biden host their fifth state dinner in honor of Japanese Prime Minister Fumio Kishida and his wife, Yuko.	President Biden and First Lady Jill Biden with Japanese Prime Minister Fumio Kishida and Yuko Kishida
Thursday, April 11	Vice President Harris and Secretary Blinken host a state luncheon for Prime Minister Kishida at the Department of State.; President Biden holds a trilateral meeting with Japanese Prime Minister Fumio Kishida and Filipino President Bongbong Marcos at the White House.	From left: Evan Ryan, Antony Blinken, Yuko Kishida, Fumio Kishida, Kamala Harris, and Doug Emhoff at the Department of State President Biden with Japanese Prime Minister Fumio Kishida and Filipino President Bongbong Marcos
Friday, April 12		
Saturday, April 13	President Biden releases a statement denouncing the Iranian strikes on Israel, confirming U.S. involvement in intercepting the strikes, and reaffirming "ironclad commitment to the security of Israel."; President Biden meets with members of the National Security Council regarding the missile attacks on Israel.; President Biden wins primaries in Alaska and Wyoming.	President Biden meets with members of the National Security Council
Sunday, April 14		
Monday, April 15	President Biden holds a bilateral meeting with Iraqi Prime Minister Mohammed Shia' Al Sudani at the White House.; President Biden holds a bilateral meeting with Czech Prime Minister Petr Fiala at the White House.	
Tuesday, April 16		
Wednesday, April 17	Two articles of impeachment against Homeland Security Secretary Alejandro Mayorkas are dismissed by the Senate in a vote of 51–48 (Note: 48 Democrats and 3 Independents voted yea while 48 Republicans voted nay and Lisa Murkowski voted present.) and 51–49. (Note: 48 Democrats and 3 Independents voted yea while 49 Republicans voted nay.)	
Thursday, April 18	Several members of the Kennedy family endorse President Biden's re-election over independent candidate and family member Robert F. Kennedy Jr.	
Friday, April 19	President Biden signs the Puyallup Tribe of Indians Land Into Trust Confirmation Act into law.	
Saturday, April 20	President Biden signs the Reforming Intelligence and Securing America Act into law.	
Sunday, April 21		
Monday, April 22		
Tuesday, April 23	President Biden wins the Pennsylvania presidential primary.	
Wednesday, April 24	President Biden signs the National Security Act, which includes the 21st Century Peace through Strength Act, into law.	
Thursday, April 25		
Friday, April 26	President Biden is interviewed by Howard Stern on The Howard Stern Show.	
Saturday, April 27	President Biden attends the White House Correspondents' Association Dinner, hosted by Colin Jost.	President Biden at the White House Correspondents' Association Dinner
Sunday, April 28	President Biden wins the Puerto Rico presidential primary.	
Monday, April 29		
Tuesday, April 30		

=== May 2024 ===
Date	Events	Photos/videos
Wednesday, May 1		
Thursday, May 2		
Friday, May 3	President Biden awards 19 people, including Nancy Pelosi, Medgar Evers and Michelle Yeoh, the Presidential Medal of Freedom.	President Biden hosting the Presidential Medal of Freedom ceremony
Saturday, May 4		
Sunday, May 5		
Monday, May 6		
Tuesday, May 7	President Biden holds a bilateral meeting with Romanian President Klaus Iohannis at the White House.; President Biden wins the Indiana presidential primary.	President Biden and Romanian President Klaus Iohannis
Wednesday, May 8	President Biden says for the first time that he will stop sending bombs and artillery shells to Israel if Israeli Prime Minister Benjamin Netanyahu orders major invasion of the city of Rafah.	
Thursday, May 9		
Friday, May 10		
Saturday, May 11		
Sunday, May 12		
Monday, May 13		
Tuesday, May 14	President Biden wins the primaries in Maryland, Nebraska, and West Virginia.	
Wednesday, May 15		
Thursday, May 16		
Friday, May 17		
Saturday, May 18		
Sunday, May 19		
Monday, May 20		
Tuesday, May 21	President Biden wins the primaries in Kentucky and Oregon.	
Wednesday, May 22	Kenyan President William Ruto, accompanied by his wife Rachel Ruto, begins a three-day state visit to the US, the sixth during the Biden presidency.	
Thursday, May 23	President Biden holds a bilateral meeting and joint press conference with Kenyan President William Ruto at the White House.; President Biden and First Lady Jill Biden host their sixth and final state dinner in honor of Kenyan President William Ruto and his wife, Rachel.; President Biden wins the Idaho Democratic presidential caucuses.	President Biden and Kenyan President William Ruto
Friday, May 24	Vice President Harris and Secretary Blinken host a state luncheon for President Ruto at the Department of State.	From left: Evan Ryan, Antony Blinken, Rachel Ruto, William Ruto, Kamala Harris, and Doug Emhoff at the Department of State
Saturday, May 25	President Biden delivers the commencement address at the United States Military Academy.	President Biden at the United States Military Academy
Sunday, May 26		
Monday, May 27	President Biden performs a wreath-laying ceremony at the Tomb of the Unknown Soldier at the Arlington National Cemetery and delivers the Memorial Day address at the Memorial Amphitheater.	President Biden, Vice President Harris and Secretary Austin at Arlington National Cemetery
Tuesday, May 28		
Wednesday, May 29		
Thursday, May 30	Former President Donald Trump was convicted of 34 felonies related to hush money paid to porn star Stormy Daniels in an attempt to influence the 2016 presidential election.	
Friday, May 31	U.S. Senator Joe Manchin leaves the Democratic Party and registers as an independent politician with the Democratic caucus still maintaining control of the U.S. Senate with 47 Democrats and now four independents aligning with the Democrats in the 118th United States Congress.; President Biden holds a bilateral meeting with Belgian Prime Minister Alexander De Croo at the White House.; At the White House, President Biden says that the conviction of former President Donald Trump proves that "no one is above the law".	

=== June 2024 ===
Date	Events	Photos/videos
Saturday, June 1		
Sunday, June 2		
Monday, June 3		
Tuesday, June 4	President Biden wins the primaries in District of Columbia, Montana, New Jersey, New Mexico, and South Dakota.	
Wednesday, June 5	President Biden arrives in Caen, France.	
Thursday, June 6	President Biden attends the 80th anniversary of D-Day memorial ceremonies in Normandy.	President Biden delivers remarks at the 80th Commemoration of D-Day
Friday, June 7	President Biden holds a bilateral meeting with Ukrainian President Volodymyr Zelenskyy at the InterContinental Paris Le Grand Hotel.	President Biden and Ukrainian President Volodymyr Zelenskyy
Saturday, June 8	President Biden and First Lady Jill Biden arrive in Paris for a two-day state visit.; President Biden holds a bilateral meeting and joint press conference with French President Emmanuel Macron at the Élysée Palace.; President Biden wins the caucuses in Guam and the U.S. Virgin Islands.	President Biden, First Lady Jill Biden, French President Emmanuel Macron and Mrs. Brigitte Macron
Sunday, June 9		
Monday, June 10		
Tuesday, June 11		
Wednesday, June 12	President Biden arrives in Fasano, Italy for the 50th G7 summit.; The US House of Representatives votes to hold US Attorney General Merrick Garland in contempt of Congress. Garland refused to fully comply with a congressional subpoena to turn over interview audio tapes from a justice department probe of President Joe Biden's handling of classified documents.	
Thursday, June 13	President Biden attends the 50th G7 summit in Fasano.; President Biden says that he will not grant a pardon to his son Hunter, convicted of lying about using drugs to buy a gun in 2018.; President Biden and his Ukrainian counterpart Volodymyr Zelenskyy sign a 10-year agreement at a bilateral meeting prior to the G7 summit in Puglia, in Italy to reinforce Ukrainian defenses against Russian forces.	G7 leaders at the 50th G7 summit President Biden and Ukrainian President Volodymyr Zelenskyy sign a bilateral security agreement
Friday, June 14	President Biden holds a bilateral meeting with Italian Prime Minister Giorgia Meloni in Apulia, Italy.; President Biden meets with Pope Francis on the margins of the G7 Leaders’ Summit in Apulia, Italy.	President Biden and Italian Prime Minister Giorgia Meloni
Saturday, June 15	President Biden flies in from Italy to attend a successful fundraiser at the 7,100-seat Peacock Theater in Los Angeles. George Clooney, Julia Roberts and Barbra Streisand were among the celebrities who took the stage. Late-night host Jimmy Kimmel interviewed Biden and former President Barack Obama.	
Sunday, June 16		
Monday, June 17	President Biden holds a bilateral meeting with NATO Secretary General Jens Stoltenberg at the White House for discussions prior to the 2024 Washington summit celebrating NATO's 75th anniversary.	President Biden and NATO Secretary General Jens Stoltenberg
Tuesday, June 18	President Biden announces a package of reforms that will allow the legalization of thousands of immigrants in the country.	
Wednesday, June 19		
Thursday, June 20		
Friday, June 21		
Saturday, June 22		
Sunday, June 23		
Monday, June 24		
Tuesday, June 25		
Wednesday, June 26		
Thursday, June 27	President Biden and presumptive Republican Party nominee former President Donald Trump participate in the first presidential debate at CNN Atlanta Studio in Atlanta, Georgia. The debate was moderated by Jake Tapper and Dana Bash of CNN.	
Friday, June 28	At a rally one day after performing poorly in the presidential debate against Donald Trump, President Biden defends himself against criticism that he is not capable of serving another term.	
Saturday, June 29	President Biden meets with campaign donors in an event in the Hamptons amid pressure for him to abandon the race for the White House.; At an event closed to the press, President Biden admits that he "didn't have a great night" in the presidential debate against Donald Trump, but assures that he "knows how to do this job".	
Sunday, June 30		

== See also ==
- First 100 days of the Biden presidency – Period from January to April 2021
- List of executive actions by Joe Biden
- Lists of presidential trips made by Joe Biden (international trips)
- Presidential transition of Joe Biden – Transfer of presidential power from Donald Trump to Joe Biden
- Timeline of the 2020 United States presidential election

== Notes ==
U.S. presidential administration timelines
Preceded by Biden presidency (2024 Q1)	Biden presidency (2024 Q2)	Succeeded by Biden presidency (2024 Q3)
