= Timeline of the Joe Biden presidency (2024 Q4–January 2025) =

The following is a timeline of the presidency of Joe Biden during the fourth and last quarter of 2024 from October 1 to December 31, 2024 and the first 20 days of 2025 from January 1 to 20, 2025, when Biden left office and was succeeded by Donald Trump. For a complete itinerary of his travels, see List of presidential trips made by Joe Biden (2024–25). To navigate between quarters, see timeline of the Joe Biden presidency.

== Timeline ==
=== October 2024 ===
Date	Events	Photos/videos
Tuesday, October 1		
Wednesday, October 2	President Biden visits North and South Carolina to survey the damage caused by Hurricane Helene. Biden tours by helicopter over the worst-hit areas in the city of Asheville, North Carolina.	President Biden in Greenville, South Carolina President Biden in Raleigh, North Carolina
Thursday, October 3	President Biden visits Florida and Georgia to survey the damage caused by Hurricane Helene. Biden tours by helicopter over the worst-hit areas in the city of Perry, Florida.	President Biden in Perry, Florida President Biden in Ray City, Georgia
Friday, October 4		
Saturday, October 5		
Sunday, October 6		
Monday, October 7	President Biden attends a memorial service for the victims of the October 7 attacks. Biden lights a candle during a remembrance ceremony in the Blue Room of the White House with First Lady Jill Biden and Rabbi Aaron Alexander of Adas Israel Congregation, marking the one-year anniversary of the Hamas attack on Israel.; Vice President Kamala Harris and Second Gentleman Doug Emhoff mark the one-year anniversary of the Hamas attack on Israel by planting a memorial pomegranate tree, symbolizing good wishes for the new year in Judaism, at the Naval Observatory, their official residence.	
Tuesday, October 8	President Biden cancels a trip to Asia and Germany due to the approach of Hurricane Milton to the Florida coast.	
Wednesday, October 9	President Biden holds a bilateral meeting with the Taoiseach of Ireland Simon Harris at the White House.; President Biden and Israeli prime minister Benjamin Netanyahu speak by phone amid the escalation of the conflict in the Middle East. The 30-minute conversation is the first between Biden and Netanyahu since August 2024.	President Biden (right) and Irish Taoiseach Simon Harris
Thursday, October 10		
Friday, October 11		
Saturday, October 12		
Sunday, October 13	President Biden visits Florida to survey the damage caused by Hurricane Milton. Biden tours by helicopter over the worst-hit areas in the city of St. Petersburg, Florida.; Axios reports the relationship between Kamala Harris's team and Joe Biden's White House has been increasingly fraught and filled with rising tensions in the final weeks before Election Day, according to 10 people familiar with the situation.; The United States Department of Defense announces that its country will send American military personnel and a high-altitude missile defense system, THAAD, to Israel.	President Biden in St. Pete Beach, Florida
Monday, October 14		
Tuesday, October 15		
Wednesday, October 16		
Thursday, October 17	President Biden lands late in Berlin, Germany on this day and meets French president Emmanuel Macron, German chancellor Olaf Scholz and UK prime minister Keir Starmer at a meeting in the same city on the next day to discuss further assistance to Ukraine and President Zelenskyy's Victory Plan.	President Biden visit to Berlin
Friday, October 18	U.S. Representative Mike Turner the chairman of the United States House Permanent Select Committee on Intelligence sends Biden a letter demanding that his administration immediately give the House Intelligence Committee a classified briefing concerning the possible engagement of North Korean troops in a potentially escalating and broadening Russo-Ukrainian war. Turner also states in the letter to Biden his view that the use of North Korean troops against Ukraine must be a red line for the United States and NATO.	
Saturday, October 19	President Biden approves the State of North Carolina disaster declaration and orders Federal assistance to supplement state, tribal, and local recovery efforts in the areas affected by Potential Tropical Cyclone Eight from September 16 to September 20, 2024.	
Sunday, October 20		
Monday, October 21	First Lady Jill Biden unveils an enhanced and educational tour of the White House for public visitors.; At the White House, President Biden honors the prestigious National Medals of Arts and National Humanities Medals to 39 recipients, including film directors Steven Spielberg and Spike Lee, singers Queen Latifah, and posthumously, Selena Quintanilla.	First Lady Jill Biden gives a tour of the White House to students.
Tuesday, October 22	President Biden holds a bilateral meeting with Slovenian prime minister Robert Golob at the White House.	President Biden (right) and Slovenian Prime Minister Robert Golob
Wednesday, October 23		
Thursday, October 24		
Friday, October 25	President Biden formally apologizes to Native Americans for abusive government-funded boarding schools that abused indigenous children and forced them to assimilate over a 150-year period.	
Saturday, October 26		
Sunday, October 27		
Monday, October 28	President Biden goes to an early voting location in his home state of Delaware, where he helps an elderly woman in a wheelchair and waits in line for his turn at the booth.	
Tuesday, October 29		
Wednesday, October 30	In a telecall with Latino voters, President Biden states that “the only garbage I see floating out there is his supporters — his — his demonization of Latinos is unconscionable, and it's un-American.” Biden's statement is made in a response to an anti-Puerto Rican joke made by comedian Tony Hinchcliffe at Donald Trump's rally on October 27.; President Biden holds a bilateral meeting with Cypriot President Nikos Christodoulides at the White House.; President Biden and First Lady Jill Biden participate in the 2024 White House Halloween event.	President Biden (right) and Cypriot President Nikos Christodoulides
Thursday, October 31	The Associated Press reports the White House altered the record of Biden's 'garbage' remarks despite stenographer concerns.	

=== November 2024 ===
Date	Events	Photos/videos
Friday, November 1		
Saturday, November 2		
Sunday, November 3		
Monday, November 4	President Biden congratulates Maia Sandu on her historic reelection as the president of Moldova.	
Tuesday, November 5	The 2024 United States presidential election takes place.; The Republican Party retains their majority in the House of Representatives and gains control of the Senate.	
Wednesday, November 6	Republican Party nominee former president Donald Trump becomes president-elect after he secures the projected total to 276 electoral votes. Democratic Party nominee vice president Kamala Harris concedes defeat and congratulates Trump on his victory.; President Biden calls President-elect Donald Trump in the early morning to congratulate him on his victory.; President Biden announces the expedited granting of over US$6 billion in military aid to Ukraine.	
Thursday, November 7	At the White House, President Biden delivers his statement following the victory of Donald Trump in the 2024 presidential election.; A Texas federal judge rules President Biden's program favoring undocumented immigrants married to American citizens is illegal.	President Biden delivers a statement following Trump's election victory.
Friday, November 8		
Saturday, November 9		
Sunday, November 10		
Monday, November 11	President Biden performs a wreath-laying ceremony at the Tomb of the Unknown Soldier at the Arlington National Cemetery and delivers the Veterans Day address at the Memorial Amphitheater. Vice President Kamala Harris attends the wreath-laying ceremony.	President Biden, Vice President Harris and Secretary McDonough at Arlington National Cemetery
Tuesday, November 12	President Biden holds a bilateral meeting with Israeli president Isaac Herzog at the White House.; President Biden holds a bilateral meeting with Indonesian president Prabowo Subianto at the White House.	President Biden and Israeli President Isaac Herzog President Biden and Indonesian President Prabowo Subianto
Wednesday, November 13	President Biden meets with President-elect Donald Trump in the Oval Office to discuss the transition of power between the presidents. It was the first time for Trump to visit the White House since leaving office at the end of his first presidency in January 2021.	President Biden and President-elect Donald Trump
Thursday, November 14		
Friday, November 15	President Biden attends the 2024 APEC summit hosted by Peruvian president Dina Boluarte.; President Biden holds a bilateral meeting with Peruvian president Dina Boluarte.; President Biden holds a trilateral meeting with Japanese prime minister Shigeru Ishiba and South Korean president Yoon Suk Yeol.	President Biden with Peruvian President Dina Boluarte President Biden with Japanese Prime Minister Shigeru Ishiba and South Korean President Yoon Suk Yeol
Saturday, November 16	In the afternoon, President Biden holds a bilateral meeting with Chinese leader Xi Jinping in Lima, Peru. This is the third official meeting between the leaders of the United States and China and the last time Biden had a meeting with Xi as president. The U.S. president attends the closing of the Asia-Pacific Economic Cooperation Forum in Lima, Peru. During his visit, President Biden and Peruvian president, Dina Boluarte, inaugurate a mega port in the city of Chancay, 80 kilometers from Lima.; At a meeting with Chinese leader Xi Jinping in Lima, Peru, President Biden condemns the deployment of thousands of North Korean troops in Russia and expresses deep concern over China's continued support for Russia's defense industrial base.	President Biden at the APEC Summit President Biden and Chinese leader Xi Jinping
Sunday, November 17	In the early afternoon, President Biden arrives in Brazil ahead of the G20 summit and lands in Manaus for a historic visit to the Amazon region. He flies over the forest and visits a museum one day before the opening of the G20 in Rio de Janeiro. This is the first time a sitting president of the United States has visited the Brazilian Amazon region, according to the White House. He becomes the first sitting president of the United States to set foot in the Brazilian Amazon region in the 200-year history of relations between the two nations.; President Biden authorizes Ukraine to use American-supplied long-range missiles in the war against Russia. The change in the U.S. government's stance is due to the sending of North Korean troops to fight in the war in Ukraine alongside the Russians.	President Biden visits the Amazon region.
Monday, November 18	President Biden attends the G20 summit hosted by Brazilian president Luiz Inácio Lula da Silva.; President Biden meets with Canadian prime minister Justin Trudeau and Italian prime minister Giorgia Meloni, when President Biden along with prime ministers Trudeau and Meloni miss in time for the official photo of the Global Alliance against Hunger and Poverty.	President Biden participates in the G20 summit.
Tuesday, November 19	President Biden approves providing anti-personnel land mines to Ukraine.; President Biden meets with Brazilian president Luiz Inácio Lula da Silva on the margins of the G20 Summit in Rio de Janeiro to discuss the U.S.-Brazil strategic relationship.	
Wednesday, November 20	President Biden celebrates his 82nd birthday, marking an age milestone never before reached by an acting commander of the country.; President Biden presents the Presidential Medal of Freedom to Cecile Richards.; The United States vetoes a ceasefire resolution in the war in the Gaza Strip at the United Nations Security Council. This is the fourth time that the Americans have rejected a proposal for a truce between Israel and Hamas since the conflict began in October 2023.	
Thursday, November 21	Treasury Secretary Janet Yellen announces sanctions against Gazprombank, the third-largest Russia bank, along with its subsidiaries.; Securities and Exchange Commission (SEC) Chair Gary Gensler announces he will resign on January 20 ahead of Trump's second inauguration.	
Friday, November 22	At the White House, President Biden receives the Boston Celtics team, NBA champions in the 2023–24 season. Star Jayson Tatum gives the president a team shirt, with Biden's name on the back.	
Saturday, November 23	President Biden delivers his statement on Holodomor Remembrance Day, in which he pledges further support from Washington for Ukraine.	
Sunday, November 24	Outgoing National Security Advisor Jake Sullivan meets with incoming National Security Advisor Michael Waltz as part of the transition from Biden to Trump.	
Monday, November 25	President Biden participates in his fourth and final National Thanksgiving Turkey Presentation.; First Lady Jill Biden welcomes the arrival of the 2024 White House Christmas Tree at the White House.; President Biden and First Lady Jill Biden travel to Staten Island, New York, to celebrate a "Friendsgiving" with members of the United States Coast Guard and families.; U.S. federal judge Tanya Chutkan of the District Court for the District of Columbia dismisses without prejudice the two criminal cases by Jack Smith against U.S. President-elect Trump, including the classified documents case and the case involving his efforts to overturn his defeat to President Joe Biden in the 2020 United States presidential election.; The White House confirms that President Biden will attend the inauguration of President-elect Trump on January 20, 2025.	President Biden delivers remarks at the National Thanksgiving Turkey Presentation. President Biden and First Lady Jill Biden at Fort Wadsworth
Tuesday, November 26	U.S. Secretary of State Antony Blinken says that ceasefire talks are reaching the final stages and that a deal could happen soon.; In Washington, President Biden announces that Israel and Lebanon have accepted the U.S. ceasefire proposal.	
Wednesday, November 27		
Thursday, November 28	President Biden celebrates Thanksgiving with his family's traditional trip to Nantucket, Massachusetts.	President Biden in Nantucket, Massachusetts
Friday, November 29		
Saturday, November 30	The United States condemns the excessive use of force by police against Georgian protesters and suspends its strategic partnership with Georgia following the Georgian Dream party's decision to suspend the country's European Union accession process.	

=== December 2024 ===
Date	Events	Photos/videos
Sunday, December 1	U.S National Security Advisor Jake Sullivan says that the United States will not return to Ukraine the nuclear weapons they dismantled.; President Biden pardons his son Hunter Biden of tax and firearms charges.	Pardon for President Biden's son Hunter Dated December 1, 2024
Monday, December 2	First Lady Jill Biden unveils the White House holiday decor for the fourth and final time.; On the first day of his visit to the African country, President Biden arrives for his long-awaited first presidential visit to sub-Saharan Africa to the cheers of thousands in Angola.	
Tuesday, December 3	On the second day of his visit to Angola, in the capital Luanda, President Biden meets Angolan President João Lourenço and says that Angola wants to work with the United States to attract foreign investment and improve defense and security ties, including joint military exercises and cooperation in the Gulf of Guinea and the South Atlantic. The Democrat delivers remarks at the National Museum of Slavery.	President Biden and Angolan President João Lourenço
Wednesday, December 4	On the third and the last day of his visit to Angola, President Biden arrives on Air Force One in Lobito, an Angolan port city, to see up close the renovation of the railway. He participates in a meeting with African leaders.	
Thursday, December 5	President Biden participates in the 102nd annual National Christmas Tree lighting ceremony.	President Biden at the 2024 National Christmas Tree lighting ceremony
Friday, December 6		
Saturday, December 7		
Sunday, December 8	President Biden delivers remarks on his first public speech since the end of the Assad regime. He speaks about the takeover of Damascus by the rebel group HTS, led by Abu Mohammed al-Golani.	
Monday, December 9	President Biden announces the designation of Carlisle Indian Industrial School as a national monument at his last White House Tribal Nations Summit.; Vice President Harris swears in Adam Schiff and Andy Kim to the United States Senate.	President Biden, Secretary Deb Haaland, and Asst. Sec. Bryan Newland at the Tribal Nations Summit.
Tuesday, December 10		
Wednesday, December 11	President Biden approves a new classified national security memorandum on growing cooperation between Russia, North Korea, Iran and China.; Lauren McFerran, the chairwoman of the National Labor Relations Board, loses a Senate renomination vote for a new term at 50–49. Outgoing independent Senators Joe Manchin and Kyrsten Sinema joined Republicans in rejecting her nomination.	
Thursday, December 12	President Biden reduces the sentences of approximately 1,500 people who were released from prison and placed in home confinement during the coronavirus pandemic and pardons 39 Americans convicted of non-violent crimes in the largest single-day act of clemency in the history of the United States.; The United States Department of Justice reports FBI errors in the invasion of the Capitol, which occurred on January 6, 2021.	
Friday, December 13		
Saturday, December 14		
Sunday, December 15	President Biden and Vice President Kamala Harris deliver remarks at the Democratic National Committee's holiday reception in Washington, D.C.	
Monday, December 16		
Tuesday, December 17	All 538 electors for the electoral college met to cast their votes and finalize the 2024 presidential election results. Both candidates received their projected counts of 312 for President-elect Trump and 226 for Vice President Harris without any faithless electors.; During a briefing at the Washington Foreign Press Center, U.S. Department of State Spokesperson Matthew Miller says that the Biden administration and Donald Trump's team communicate on foreign policy issues, including Russia's war against Ukraine.	
Wednesday, December 18		
Thursday, December 19		
Friday, December 20		
Saturday, December 21	President Biden signs the law approved by Congress to fund the government until March 14 and thus prevent a shutdown of services in the country.	
Sunday, December 22		
Monday, December 23	President Biden commutes the sentences of 37 out of 40 federal death row inmates, excluding Robert Bowers, Dylann Roof, and Dzhokhar Tsarnaev.	
Tuesday, December 24	President Biden signs 50 bills including a bill to prohibit former members of Congress who have been convicted of corruption from receiving pensions, the Stop Institutional Child Abuse Act, and a bill making the bald eagle the official national bird of the United States.	
Wednesday, December 25	President Biden celebrates the fourth and final Christmas Day of his administration.	President Biden and First Lady Jill Biden on Christmas Day
Thursday, December 26	President Biden and First Lady Jill Biden travel to the U.S. Virgin Islands to vacation there until after the new year despite his term only having three weeks left.	
Friday, December 27		
Saturday, December 28		
Sunday, December 29	President Biden releases a statement on the death of former president Jimmy Carter and declares January 9, 2025, as a national day of mourning.	President Biden delivers remarks on the death of Jimmy Carter
Monday, December 30		
Tuesday, December 31	Joe Biden celebrates the fourth and final New Year's Day countdown of his administration in Wilmington, Delaware.	

=== January 2025 ===
Date	Events	Photos/videos
Wednesday, January 1	President Biden reports that the suspect in an attack in New Orleans published videos on social media hours before the crime, in which he indicated he was inspired by the armed group Islamic State.	
Thursday, January 2	President Biden awards Liz Cheney and 19 other people with the Presidential Citizens Medal.	
Friday, January 3	The 119th United States Congress convenes with the Republican Party retaining their majority in the House of Representatives and controlling the Senate.; Mike Johnson is re-elected as Speaker of the United States House of Representatives.; President Biden awards the Medal of Honor to seven U.S. Army veterans for heroism during the Korean War and Vietnam War.; President Biden blocks the proposed acquisition of U.S. Steel by Nippon Steel.	House Speaker Mike Johnson
Saturday, January 4	During the ceremony in the East Room of the White House, President Biden awards the Presidential Medal of Freedom to 19 of the most famous names in politics, sports, entertainment, science, and civil rights and LGBTQIA+ community advocates. The exception is Argentine player Lionel Messi, who is absent from the ceremony.	
Sunday, January 5		
Monday, January 6	Congress holds a joint session, where the 2024 electoral college results are counted. In her role as President of the Senate, Vice President Kamala Harris reads the results and declares President-elect Donald Trump as the winner after Congress certifies the electoral votes.	
Tuesday, January 7		
Wednesday, January 8	President Biden signs an executive order recognizing the fires in the Los Angeles region as a major disaster.	
Thursday, January 9	President Biden cancels a trip to Italy and Vatican City due to the Los Angeles wildfires.; President Biden and First Lady Jill Biden attend the funeral of late former president Jimmy Carter at Washington National Cathedral.	President Biden delivers remarks at a memorial service for former President Jimmy Carter.
Friday, January 10		
Saturday, January 11	President Biden awards the Presidential Medal of Freedom to Pope Francis with a distinction. This is the first time that President Biden has awarded the Medal of Freedom at its highest level.; Jack Smith resigns as special counsel of the United States Department of Justice.	
Sunday, January 12	Rahm Emanuel steps down as United States Ambassador to Japan ahead of January 20th.	
Monday, January 13		
Tuesday, January 14	President Biden removes Cuba from the list of countries that sponsor terrorism.	
Wednesday, January 15	A ceasefire deal is reached during the Gaza war.; President Biden delivers his farewell address to the nation in the Oval Office in which he warns of an emerging oligarchy and tech–industrial complex.	President Biden gives a farewell address in the Oval Office.
Thursday, January 16	President Biden gives his farewell address to the armed forces at Joint Base Myer–Henderson Hall in Arlington, Virginia.	General Charles Q. Brown Jr., Chairman of the Joint Chiefs of Staff, at a farewell ceremony for President Joseph Biden and Kamala Harris with Lloyd Austin, Secretary of Defense, at Joint Base Myer-Henderson Hall, January 16, 2025
Friday, January 17	The Supreme Court of the United States upholds the provisions of the Protecting Americans from Foreign Adversary Controlled Applications Act banning social media platform TikTok unless it is sold by ByteDance.	
Saturday, January 18	Antony Blinken and UAE foreign minister Abdullah bin Zayed Al Nahyan discusses bilateral relations in a phone call.	
Sunday, January 19	President Biden issues pardons on his final full day as president.; President Biden is made a Master Mason by the Prince Hall Grand Lodge of South Carolina.	
Monday, January 20	On his last day in the White House, President Biden grants a preemptive pardon to General Mark Milley, Dr. Anthony Fauci and members of the congressional committee and witnesses to the January 6 attack on the Capitol, saying they "do not deserve to be the targets of unjustified and politically motivated prosecutions".; President Biden receives and greets President-elect Donald Trump, who arrived at the White House, for the formal transition of power in the United States. He is accompanied by First Lady Jill Biden.; Vice President Kamala Harris receives and greets Vice President-elect JD Vance, who arrived at the White House. During the ceremony, she is accompanied by the second gentleman Doug Emhoff.; President Biden issues preemptive pardons for several members of his family, citing the possibility of "baseless and politically motivated investigations" affecting their lives in his post-presidency.; President Biden completes his full term in office and leaves the White House for the final time as Commander-in-chief.; Donald Trump is inaugurated as the 47th president of the United States, at noon EST.; After the inauguration, Biden, now the former president, flew directly from Andrews Air Force Base in Maryland to Vandenberg Space Force Base in California for a vacation in the Santa Ynez Valley where he begins his post-presidency.	Pardon for President Biden's siblings and their spouses dated January 19, 2025 President Biden and Vice President Harris with their spouses before the end of their terms

== See also ==
- First 100 days of the Biden presidency – Period from January to April 2021
- List of executive actions by Joe Biden
- Lists of presidential trips made by Joe Biden (international trips)
- Presidential transition of Joe Biden – Transfer of presidential power from Donald Trump to Joe Biden
- Timeline of the 2020 United States presidential election

U.S. presidential administration timelines
Preceded by Biden presidency (2024 Q3)	Biden presidency (2024 Q4 – January 2025)	Succeeded by Second Trump presidency (2025 Q1)
