= Timeline of the Joe Biden presidency (2024 Q3) =

The following is a timeline of the presidency of Joe Biden during the third quarter of 2024, from July 1 to September 30, 2024. For a complete itinerary of his travels, see List of presidential trips made by Joe Biden (2024–25). To navigate between quarters, see timeline of the Joe Biden presidency. For the Q4 timeline see timeline of the Joe Biden presidency (2024 Q4–January 2025).

== Timeline ==
=== July 2024 ===
Date	Events	Photos/videos
Monday, July 1	At night, President Biden criticizes the Supreme Court's decision in Trump v. United States, which granted partial immunity to former president Donald Trump in the case of the Capitol invasion on January 6, 2021. President Biden calls the decision "a dangerous precedent" because the power of the presidency will no longer be limited by law.	Supreme Court's Immunity Ruling
Tuesday, July 2		
Wednesday, July 3	President Biden posthumously awards the Medal of Honor at the White House to Privates Philip G. Shadrach and George D. Wilson, the former American soldier who served during the Civil War.; In a speech during a surprise appearance on a virtual call from the Democratic National Committee, President Biden responds to pressure to give up running in the presidential election and says that he is not thinking about giving up. At night, President Biden meets with 24 Democratic governors.	
Thursday, July 4	At the White House, President Biden and his family celebrate Independence Day.; During a July 4 speech, President Biden says that he was “not going anywhere”. The speech is made after supporters in the audience chanted “keep up the fight”.; With the help of a teleprompter to guests at the White House, President Biden indicates that he would not give up, he continues to face pressure from supporters and campaign donors to abandon the presidential race. His speech is after Disney heiress Abigail Disney announces that she will cut off donations to the Democratic Party until the president drops out of the race.	President Biden host 4th of July celebrations at the White House
Friday, July 5	In an interview with ABC News, President Biden admits that he was not well prepared for the first presidential debate with Donald Trump. The Democrat also claims he was sick and blamed himself for the "bad episode".	
Saturday, July 6		
Sunday, July 7		
Monday, July 8	White House Press Secretary Karine Jean-Pierre denies that President Biden has Parkinson's, after visitor logs revealed that Dr. Kevin Cannard, a specialist in movement disorders, had visited the White House Medical Unit several times during late 2023 and early 2024.; In a letter sent to lawmakers, President Biden confronts members of his party and again refuses the request of Democrats for him to give up running for re-election. In the two-page document, President Biden also urges Democrats to stop demanding him to drop out of the presidential race.; In an interview to the American TV network NBC, President Biden criticizes Democrats who called for his withdrawal.	
Tuesday, July 9	At night, President Biden and First Lady Jill Biden open NATO's anniversary ceremony, with an event taking place in the Andrew W. Mellon Auditorium, where the document that created the North Atlantic Treaty Organization (NATO) was signed in 1949. He meets heads of state and government from the 32 countries in Washington DC to celebrate the Western military alliance's 75th anniversary. At the opening of the event, President Biden gives a speech.	President Biden and NATO leaders
Wednesday, July 10	President Biden holds a bilateral meeting with British prime minister Keir Starmer at the White House.	President Biden and British Prime Minister Keir Starmer
Thursday, July 11	Minutes before an interview considered decisive and under pressure to drop out of the electoral race, President Biden accidentally addresses Ukrainian president Volodymyr Zelenskyy as "President Putin" during a NATO event in Washington. In a rare press conference, Biden refers to his vice president Kamala Harris as President Trump.; An attempt by the House of Representatives to find United States Attorney General Merrick Garland in "inherent contempt" falls short in a 204 to 210 vote, with four Republicans voting with all Democrats to oppose the measure. The resolution would have imposed a fine of $10,000 per day on Garland for defying a congressional subpoena until he handed over audio of former special counsel Robert Hur’s interview with President Biden.	
Friday, July 12	At a rally in Detroit, Michigan, President Biden says that he is the Democratic nominee for the presidential election and that he will not abandon voters.	
Saturday, July 13	President Biden makes a statement after the attempted assassination of his opponent former president Donald Trump in Butler, Pennsylvania. In a document released by the White House, President Biden also praises the American Secret Service and condemns the act of violence. Earlier, in a document released by the White House, President Biden already says that he is "grateful to know that Donald Trump is safe and well". President Biden talks by phone with Donald Trump after an attack in Pennsylvania.	President Biden delivers remarks on the attempted assassination of Donald Trump
Sunday, July 14	In the speech at the White House, President Biden says that he ordered an independent review into the attempted assassination of Donald Trump.; President Biden addresses the nation on prime-time television in the Oval Office for a third time concerning the attempted assassination of Donald Trump.	President Biden addresses the nation on the attempted assassination of Donald Trump
Monday, July 15	In an interview with NBC News, President Biden says that it was a "mistake" to say he wanted to put a "bullseye" on Republican candidate Donald Trump, the target of an attack in Pennsylvania.	
Tuesday, July 16		
Wednesday, July 17	President Biden tests positive for COVID-19, causing him to cancel an appearance at a UnidosUS conference in Las Vegas.; In an interview with BET News presenter Ed Gordon, President Biden says that he would consider abandoning his re-election candidacy if his doctors found he had a "medical condition" that would prevent him from serving another term as president.	
Thursday, July 18		
Friday, July 19	The White House physician said in a letter that President Biden is recovering well from COVID and is continuing the use of Paxlovid.	
Saturday, July 20		
Sunday, July 21	President Biden calls Slovenian prime minister Robert Golob, just an hour before announcing his withdrawal from the presidential race, to request a pardon for two Russian spies to be included in the biggest prisoner exchange between Russia and the West since the Cold War.; President Biden announces, via a letter posted on X, that he will exit the 2024 presidential race and immediately gave his full endorsement of vice president Kamala Harris to replace him in his place as the party's presidential nominee. Vice President Harris quickly launches her own presidential campaign and becomes the presumptive nominee for the Democratic Party the next day.; With Biden out of the presidential race, U.S. Representative Dean Phillips proposed a straw poll of delegates ahead of the Democratic National Convention to determine the party's top four presidential contenders, who would then take part in four town halls outlining their platforms. After the town halls, the delegates would vote to choose the nominee.	
Monday, July 22	Representative Lauren Boebert demands "proof of life" from President Biden, amid speculation he may be seriously ill or deceased as he has not been seen in person since July 17.	
Tuesday, July 23	President Biden returns to the White House after 5 days in isolation due to his COVID-19 diagnosis.; The New York Times reported that Biden's main opponent in the 2024 Democratic Party presidential primaries, Representative Dean Phillips, "found himself “deplatformed,” taken off the ballot in some states, and rarely invited on television to make his case."	
Wednesday, July 24	President Biden addresses the nation on prime-time television in the Oval Office for a fourth time, concerning his decision to drop out of the presidential race.	President Biden addresses the nation on his decision not to seek reelection
Thursday, July 25	President Biden holds a bilateral meeting with Israeli prime minister Benjamin Netanyahu at the White House.; The United States House of Representatives votes 220-196 to pass a resolution condemning the Biden administration, and Vice President Kamala Harris in particular, for their handling of the U.S. Southern border. Six Democrats voted with all Republicans in the House to pass the resolution.	
Friday, July 26		
Saturday, July 27		
Sunday, July 28		
Monday, July 29	President Biden announces a plan from his government to reform the Supreme Court of the United States and eliminate life tenure for judges.	
Tuesday, July 30	During a phone call, President Biden and Brazilian president Luiz Inácio Lula da Silva demand that the Venezuelan government immediately release complete, transparent and detailed electoral data to guarantee a fraud-free result in the Venezuelan presidential election.; Also during a phone call, President Biden thanks Lula for the joint work on the Partnership for Workers’ Rights and confirms his attendance at the G20 summit in Rio de Janeiro on 18–19 November.	
Wednesday, July 31		

=== August 2024 ===
Date	Events	Photos/videos
Thursday, August 1	President Biden and Vice President Harris meet American journalist Evan Gershkovich and former US Marine Paul Whelan who returned to the United States, hours after being released by Russia in a prisoner swap between Washington and Moscow, the largest of its kind since the end of the Cold War.	President Biden and Vice President Harris meet US Marine Paul Whelan after his release in a prisoner swap with Russia.
Friday, August 2		
Saturday, August 3		
Sunday, August 4		
Monday, August 5		
Tuesday, August 6		
Wednesday, August 7		
Thursday, August 8	President Biden celebrates the World Series Texas Rangers championship.	President Biden receives an honorary jersey from the Texas Rangers following their victory at the 2023 World Series.
Friday, August 9		
Saturday, August 10		
Sunday, August 11		
Monday, August 12		
Tuesday, August 13		
Wednesday, August 14		
Thursday, August 15	President Biden is asked by a journalist and says that he agrees the idea of the new elections in Venezuela which was suggested by Brazilian president Luiz Inácio Lula da Silva.	
Friday, August 16	In a letter sent to President Biden, thirty former heads of state say that Venezuelan Nicolás Maduro is trying to gain time and reject the idea of new elections in Venezuela.	
Saturday, August 17		
Sunday, August 18		
Monday, August 19	President Biden is a keynote speaker at the Democratic National Convention in Chicago. During a speech on the convention's first day, he says that democracy needs to be preserved. He criticizes Republican nominee former president Donald Trump and praises Democratic presidential nominee vice president Kamala Harris.	
Tuesday, August 20	U.S. senator Bob Menendez resigns after being found guilty of conspiracy by a public official to act as a foreign agent.	
Wednesday, August 21		
Thursday, August 22		
Friday, August 23	President Biden says that he will be sending Ukraine a new military aid package. A statement marks the Ukrainian Independence Day on the next day.	
Saturday, August 24		
Sunday, August 25		
Monday, August 26	President Biden condemns the large-scale missile attack on Ukraine by Russia which took place on the same day, in which it deployed hundreds of missiles and drones.	
Tuesday, August 27		
Wednesday, August 28	The United States Supreme Court declines to revive President Biden's student debt relief plan, giving a boost to Republican-led states that have sued to block it.	
Thursday, August 29		
Friday, August 30		
Saturday, August 31		

=== September 2024 ===
Date	Events	Photos/videos
Sunday, September 1	President Biden says that he was "devastated and outraged" by the news of the deaths of 23-year-old Israeli-American citizen Hersh Goldberg-Polin and the other hostages, who were kidnapped by the terrorist group Hamas in the October 7, 2023 attacks.	
Monday, September 2	President Biden says that he believes Israeli prime minister Benjamin Netanyahu is not doing enough to secure a deal with Hamas for the release of Israeli hostages in the Gaza Strip. He speaks with reporters at the White House after Israeli forces recovered the bodies of six Hamas hostages, including 23-year-old Israeli-American citizen Hersh Goldberg-Polin, from a tunnel in Gaza.	
Tuesday, September 3	In the speech at the White House, President Biden says that he condemns this deplorable attack in the strongest possible terms. His statement comments the Russian missile attack on the Ukrainian city of Poltava, which resulted in the deaths of more than 50 people and left dozens injured.	
Wednesday, September 4	The Biden administration accuses Russia of trying to interfere in the 2024 presidential election in the United States. The Department of Treasury of the United States announces sanctions and other measures against Russian state news agencies and the hacker group for interfering with the 2024 presidential election in the United States.; National Security Council spokesman John Kirby says that Russian president Vladimir Putin knew about the actions of the state news agency RT to influence the presidential election in the United States.	
Thursday, September 5	President Biden visits the Vernon Electric Cooperative, in Westby, Wisconsin.	
Friday, September 6		
Saturday, September 7		
Sunday, September 8		
Monday, September 9	The Biden administration sends Congress a classified report on its strategy for the war in Ukraine, months after a June deadline mandated in a multibillion-dollar spending bill lawmakers passed in April.	
Tuesday, September 10	Secretary of State Antony Blinken talks a news conference in London that President Biden is "not ruling out" allowing Ukraine to fire missiles deep into Russian territory.	
Wednesday, September 11	President Biden attends a ceremony at the September 11 Memorial in New York City commemorating the 23rd anniversary of the September 11 attacks. Democratic presidential nominee vice president Kamala Harris and Republican presidential nominee former president Donald Trump were also in attendance hours after their first presidential debate hosted by ABC in Philadelphia.; President Biden visits a fire station in Pennsylvania where he attends with children wearing Trump shirts.	
Thursday, September 12	The Biden administration imposes sanctions on 16 members of the Venezuelan government and the country's judiciary close to Venezuelan President Nicolás Maduro in retaliation for the country's electoral process, which Washington called fraudulent.	
Friday, September 13	President Biden holds a bilateral meeting with British prime minister Keir Starmer at the White House to discuss whether to allow Kiev to use US ATACMS or British Storm Shadow missiles against targets in Russia.; At the White House, President Biden says that attacks on Haitians in the United States “have to stop”. His statement is made after Republican presidential nominee former president Donald Trump reiterated false claims that Haitian immigrants from the country were eating neighbors’ pets, such as dogs and cats.; Secretary of State Antony Blinken says that the United States will impose sanctions on three entities and two individuals linked to a Russian campaign to destabilize countries around the world.	President Biden and British Prime Minister Keir Starmer
Saturday, September 14		
Sunday, September 15		
Monday, September 16	President Biden says that the United States Secret Service needs help and more agents, following the alleged assassination attempt on Republican presidential nominee former president Donald Trump. Due to the episode, the United States Secret Service agency was criticized for not detecting the suspect, who was found just a few meters from the golf course in West Palm Beach, Florida, where Trump was playing a game.	
Tuesday, September 17		
Wednesday, September 18	The FBI says that an investigation by its intelligence service and other agencies of the United States has found that Iran tried to influence the country's presidential election by sending stolen documents from Donald Trump to Joe Biden's campaign. Iranian government denies attempted interference.	
Thursday, September 19	President Biden delivers remarks to the Economic Club of Washington, D.C.	President Biden delivers remarks to the Economic Club of Washington, D.C.
Friday, September 20		
Saturday, September 21	President Biden holds a meeting of the Quadrilateral Security Dialogue with Australian prime minister Anthony Albanese, Indian prime minister Narendra Modi, and Japanese prime minister Fumio Kishida.	President Biden with prime ministers Albanese, Modi and Kishida
Sunday, September 22		
Monday, September 23		
Tuesday, September 24	President Biden delivers a speech at the seventy-ninth session of the United Nations General Assembly. In his final speech, Biden says that he was optimistic about resolving current global conflicts, but also called for more support for Ukraine to win the war against Russia and an immediate end to the war in Gaza. Biden is preceded by Brazilian President Luiz Inácio Lula da Silva, who opened the session of speeches by state leaders. The session begins on the same day.; The House Foreign Affairs Committee recommends U.S. Secretary of State Antony Blinken be held in contempt of Congress for failing to comply with a subpoena seeking information about the 2021 U.S. withdrawal from Afghanistan.	President Biden addresses the United Nations General Assembly
Wednesday, September 25	The United States House of Representatives passes a resolution condemning President Biden and Vice President Kamala Harris for the U.S. withdrawal from Afghanistan. The resolution passed 219–194, with 10 Democrats and all Republicans voting in favor.	
Thursday, September 26	President Biden holds a meeting with Ukrainian president Volodymyr Zelenskyy on the sidelines of the United Nations General Assembly in New York.; President Biden holds a bilateral meeting with Ukrainian president Volodymyr Zelenskyy at the White House.; U.S. Representative Rashida Tlaib calls on United States Secretary of State Antony Blinken to resign in a social media post, citing the ProPublica story alleging he had rejected internal government findings about Israel blocking humanitarian aid to Gaza. The internal findings, ProPublica reported, could have implications for U.S. military aid to Israel because of U.S. laws — which require an end to weapons shipments to countries that block U.S.-backed humanitarian aid.	President Biden and Ukrainian President Volodymyr Zelenskyy
Friday, September 27		
Saturday, September 28		
Sunday, September 29		
Monday, September 30	The Pentagon says that the United States will send more troops and fighter jets to the Middle East to bolster Israel's security and, if necessary, defend its ally in the region.	

== See also ==
- First 100 days of the Biden presidency – Period from January to April 2021
- List of executive actions by Joe Biden
- Lists of presidential trips made by Joe Biden (international trips)
- Presidential transition of Joe Biden – Transfer of presidential power from Donald Trump to Joe Biden
- Timeline of the 2020 United States presidential election

== Notes ==
U.S. presidential administration timelines
Preceded by Biden presidency (2024 Q2)	Biden presidency (2024 Q3)	Succeeded by Biden presidency (2024 Q4–January 2025)
