= Timeline of the Joe Biden presidency (2024 Q1) =

The following is a timeline of the presidency of Joe Biden during the first quarter of 2024, from January 1 to March 31, 2024. For a complete itinerary of his travels, see List of presidential trips made by Joe Biden (2024–25). To navigate between quarters, see timeline of the Joe Biden presidency. For the Q2 timeline see timeline of the Joe Biden presidency (2024 Q2).

== Timeline ==
=== January 2024 ===
Date	Events	Photos/videos
Monday, January 1		
Tuesday, January 2		
Wednesday, January 3		
Thursday, January 4		
Friday, January 5	President Biden delivers remarks at a campaign event at Montgomery County Community College, Blue Bell, Pennsylvania, near the Revolutionary War battle site of Valley Forge. First Lady Jill Biden is in attendance.	
Saturday, January 6	Vice President Kamala Harris delivers the keynote address at the 7th Episcopal District AME Church Women’s Missionary Society annual retreat in Myrtle Beach, South Carolina, marking the attacks on the U.S. Capitol in 2021.	
Sunday, January 7		
Monday, January 8	President Biden speaks at Emanuel African Methodist Episcopal Church in Charleston, South Carolina and compares Trump's election denialism to the Confederates who refused to accept they had lost the American Civil War.	
Tuesday, January 9		
Wednesday, January 10		
Thursday, January 11	President Biden confirms that the United States and the United Kingdom, supported by Australia, Bahrain, Canada and the Netherlands, launched an attack on areas controlled by the Houthi rebels in Yemen.	
Friday, January 12	During a trip to Pennsylvania, President Biden defends strikes on Iran-backed Houthi militants over their attacks on shipping in the Red Sea and vows to respond again.; Biden's primary opponent for the Democratic nomination for president, U.S. Representative Dean Phillips, tells Politico that he believes representatives of the Biden campaign were using access to pressure liberal media outlets into blackballing and not platforming him.	
Saturday, January 13	President Biden says that the United States does not support Taiwan's independence, after the victory of the Democratic Progressive Party candidate, who is opposed to unification with China.	
Sunday, January 14		
Monday, January 15		
Tuesday, January 16		
Wednesday, January 17	A non-binding resolution denouncing the Biden-Harris administration's handling of the U.S. southern border passed the House of Representatives by a vote of 225-187, with 211 Republicans and 14 Democrats supporting it.; In a letter sent to Brazilian President Luiz Inácio Lula da Silva on the same day, President Biden says that Brazil and the United States will "stand side by side to ensure that democracy continues to triumph." Biden calls Lula a friend and says there is much to be done by both leaders. The American president expressed agreement with Lula's speech on the anniversary of the 2023 January 8 coup attacks in Brasília.	
Thursday, January 18	The United States House of Representatives approves a stopgap bill to fund the federal government through early March and avert a partial government shutdown.	
Friday, January 19	President Biden signs the Further Additional Continuing Appropriations and Other Extensions Act into law.; The United States Department of Education approves the cancellation of $4.9 billion in federal student loan debt for close to 74,000 borrowers.	
Saturday, January 20	President Biden completes his third year in office.; Biden's primary opponent for the Democratic nomination for president, U.S. Representative Dean Phillips, tells Axios that he thinks it would be "impossible" for Biden to do the job for four more years. And even being so blunt as to say, "At that stage of life, it is impossible ultimately to conduct, to prosecute the office of the American presidency in the way that this country in the world needs right now. That is an absolute truth."	
Sunday, January 21		
Monday, January 22		
Tuesday, January 23	President Biden wins the non-binding New Hampshire Democratic presidential primary through write-in votes, winning over 60% of the vote. U.S. Representative Dean Phillips also wins a significant number of votes in the New Hampshire Democratic presidential primary, winning over 19% of the vote.; President Biden and Vice President Kamala Harris join forces at a rally to campaign for abortion rights in Virginia.	
Wednesday, January 24		
Thursday, January 25		
Friday, January 26		
Saturday, January 27	President Biden and his opponent in the primary, U.S. Representative Dean Phillips, spoke at the South Carolina Democratic Party's First-in-the-Nation Celebration dinner in Columbia, South Carolina.	
Sunday, January 28	President Joe Biden speaks about his religious faith during a church service at Saint John Baptist Church in West Columbia, South Carolina.	
Monday, January 29		
Tuesday, January 30	President Biden says that he has decided on response to the killing of three American service members on 28 January in a drone attack in Jordan and does not want to expand the war in the Middle East.	
Wednesday, January 31		

=== February 2024 ===
Date	Events	Photos/videos
Thursday, February 1		
Friday, February 2	President Biden and First Lady Jill Biden attend a dignified transfer of fallen troops at the Dover Air Force Base for the 3 reservists killed in the Tower 22 drone attack.	
Saturday, February 3	President Biden wins the South Carolina Democratic presidential primary.	
Sunday, February 4	President Biden speaks at a campaign event, in a predominantly Black section of Las Vegas, Nevada.	
Monday, February 5		
Tuesday, February 6	The House of Representatives fails to impeach Homeland Security Secretary Alejandro Mayorkas in a vote of 214–216.; President Biden signs the Overtime Pay for Protective Services Act into law.; President Biden wins the Nevada Democratic presidential primary.	
Wednesday, February 7	At night, President Biden mistakenly refers to a conversation he had with Angela Merkel in 2021 as having taken place with the late German Chancellor Helmut Kohl, who died in 2017.	
Thursday, February 8	The Department of Justice decides not to charge President Biden relating to the Joe Biden classified documents incident, and he is described as a “well-meaning, elderly man with a poor memory” with “diminished faculties in advancing age” in a report from Special Counsel Robert Hur.; President Biden responds by speaking against the report's description of his faculties.; President Biden confuses the president of Egypt, Abdel Fattah al-Sisi, with the president of Mexico, Andrés Manuel López Obrador.	Special Counsel's report on classified documents
Friday, February 9	President Biden holds a bilateral meeting with German Chancellor Olaf Scholz at the White House.; President Biden signs the Moving Americans Privacy Protection Act into law.	President Biden and German Chancellor Olaf Scholz
Saturday, February 10		
Sunday, February 11	President Biden tells Israeli Prime Minister Benjamin Netanyahu that Israel should not proceed with a military operation in Rafah without a plan to ensure the safety of the estimated one million people sheltering there.	
Monday, February 12	President Biden holds a bilateral meeting with King Abdullah II of Jordan at the White House.	President Biden, First Lady Jill Biden, King Abdullah II, Queen Rania and Crown Prince Hussein of Jordan
Tuesday, February 13	Homeland Security Secretary Alejandro Mayorkas is impeached by the House of Representatives on the charge of "failure to enforce immigration laws" in a vote of 214–213.	
Wednesday, February 14		
Thursday, February 15		
Friday, February 16		
Saturday, February 17		
Sunday, February 18		
Monday, February 19		
Tuesday, February 20	The United States vetoes a United Nations Security Council resolution demanding an immediate humanitarian cease-fire in the ongoing Israeli invasion of the Gaza Strip.	President Biden at Joint Base Andrews with Colonel Paul Pawluk
Wednesday, February 21	Secretary of State Antony Blinken meets with Brazilian President Luiz Inácio Lula da Silva in Brasília, Brazil.	
Thursday, February 22		
Friday, February 23		
Saturday, February 24		
Sunday, February 25		
Monday, February 26	President Biden is interviewed on Late Night with Seth Meyers.	From left to right, Amy Poehler, President Biden and Seth Meyers during the taping of Late Night with Seth Meyers
Tuesday, February 27	President Biden wins the Michigan Democratic presidential primary.	
Wednesday, February 28		
Thursday, February 29	President Biden travels to Brownsville, Texas, to visit the U.S.–Mexico border.	President Biden (left) with United States Border Patrol agents in Brownsville

=== March 2024 ===
Date	Events	Photos/videos
Friday, March 1	President Biden holds a bilateral meeting with Italian Prime Minister Giorgia Meloni at the White House.; President Biden signs the Extension of Continuing Appropriations and Other Matters Act into law.; President Biden says that the United States will use planes to drop humanitarian aid into the Gaza Strip in the coming days. His announcement is made a day after more than 100 Palestinians were killed during a supply delivery.	President Biden Holds a Bilateral Meeting with Prime Minister Giorgia Meloni of Italy
Saturday, March 2	In response to the flour massacre, the U.S. military begins airdropping food aid into Gaza.	
Sunday, March 3		
Monday, March 4		
Tuesday, March 5	President Biden wins fifteen of sixteen states in the Super Tuesday contests: Alabama, Arkansas, California, Colorado, Iowa, Maine, Massachusetts, Minnesota, North Carolina, Oklahoma, Tennessee, Texas, Utah, Vermont, and Virginia.; Businessman Jason Palmer wins the American Samoa Democratic caucus.	
Wednesday, March 6	US Representative Dean Phillips suspends his campaign for the Democratic nomination for President and endorses Biden.; Biden calls Phillips on the phone. Biden admits in the phone call that if he had been a younger lawmaker, he too would have challenged an aging commander-in-chief and promises Phillips a White House meeting.	
Thursday, March 7	President Biden delivers his third official State of the Union Address.; During his speech, President Biden criticizes Donald Trump, without mentioning the former president by name, and states that freedom is at risk. This is the final speech of Biden's term as president of the United States.; President Biden congratulated Sweden on becoming the 32nd member of NATO.	President Biden delivers his third official State of the Union Address (transcript)
Friday, March 8	President Biden signs the Airport and Airway Extension Act into law.	
Saturday, March 9	President Biden signs the Consolidated Appropriations Act into law.; In an interview with the TV channel MSNBC, President Biden says that Prime Minister Benjamin Netanyahu is “harming more than helping” Israel with his stance in the Gaza Strip.	
Sunday, March 10		
Monday, March 11	Marcia Fudge announces her resignation from her position as Secretary of Housing and Urban Development, effective March 22.	
Tuesday, March 12	President Biden holds a bilateral meeting with Polish President Andrzej Duda and Polish Prime Minister Donald Tusk at the White House.; President Biden wins the primaries in Georgia, Mississippi, Northern Mariana Islands, and Washington, clinching enough delegates to officially become the presumptive nominee of the Democratic Party.; President Biden says that he "sometimes gets confused about dates" during testimony he gave to US prosecutors as part of the investigation into classified government documents found in his home. Biden has come under scrutiny after his lawyers found classified documents in his garage that the president says he took by mistake when he was Barack Obama's vice president.	President Biden and Polish leaders
Wednesday, March 13		
Thursday, March 14	President Biden meets with supporters and volunteers during a campaign event in Saginaw, Michigan.	
Friday, March 15	President Biden celebrates Saint Patrick's Day, the national holiday of Ireland. As is tradition on this day in the White House, President Biden received a bowl of shamrock from the Taoiseach of Ireland Leo Varadkar and held a bilateral meeting with him. This was the second time since 2020 (and the Biden Presidency overall) that the shamrock bowl was received in person as the 2021 and 2022 ceremonies were virtual due to the COVID-19 pandemic.	President Biden and Taoiseach of Ireland Leo Varadkar
Saturday, March 16		
Sunday, March 17	President Biden hosts a St. Patrick's Day brunch with Catholic leadersin the East Room of the White House. The Taoiseach of Ireland, Leo Varadkar, attends the event with his partner, Matthew Barrett.	President Biden giving remarks during a St. Patrick's Day brunch at the White House
Monday, March 18	President Biden signs the End Fentanyl Act and the Disaster Assistance Deadlines Alignment Act into law.	President Biden signing the Disaster Assistance Deadlines Alignment Act
Tuesday, March 19	President Biden wins the primaries in Arizona, Florida, Illinois, Kansas, and Ohio.; President Biden speaks at a campaign event at a local Mexican restaurant, in Phoenix and personally appeals to Latino voters.	
Wednesday, March 20		
Thursday, March 21		
Friday, March 22	President Biden signs a bill that designates a federal building in Detroit as the Rosa Parks Federal Building.; Secretary Fudge's resignation takes effect, as Adrianne Todman assumes the position of acting HUD secretary.	
Saturday, March 23	President Biden signs the Further Consolidated Appropriations Act into law.; President Biden wins the primaries in Louisiana and Missouri.	
Sunday, March 24		
Monday, March 25	The United States abstains on a resolution for an immediate ceasefire in the Gaza Strip, which is approved by the United Nations Security Council.	
Tuesday, March 26	President Biden says the federal government will pay for repairs to the Francis Scott Key Bridge in Baltimore, Maryland following its collapse. He also announces plans to visit Baltimore in the near future.	Wreckage of the Francis Scott Key Bridge with the Dali underneath
Wednesday, March 27		
Thursday, March 28		
Friday, March 29		
Saturday, March 30	President Biden wins the North Dakota Democratic presidential primary.	
Sunday, March 31		

== See also ==
- First 100 days of the Biden presidency – Period from January to April 2021
- List of executive actions by Joe Biden
- Lists of presidential trips made by Joe Biden (international trips)
- Presidential transition of Joe Biden – Transfer of presidential power from Donald Trump to Joe Biden
- Timeline of the 2020 United States presidential election

== Notes ==
U.S. presidential administration timelines
Preceded by Biden presidency (2023 Q4)	Biden presidency (2024 Q1)	Succeeded by Biden presidency (2024 Q2)
