= List of presidential trips made by Joe Biden (2024–25) =

This is a list of presidential trips made by Joe Biden during 2024 and early 2025, the fourth and final year of his presidency as the 46th president of the United States.

This list excludes trips made within Washington, D.C., the US federal capital in which the White House, the official residence and principal workplace of the president, is located. Also excluded are trips to Camp David, the country residence of the president, as well as Joint Base Andrews. International trips are included. The number of visits per state or territory where he traveled are:

- One: Connecticut, Indiana, New Jersey, Ohio and Washington
- Two: Arizona, Louisiana, Massachusetts and US Virgin Islands
- Three: Illinois, Nevada and New Hampshire
- Four: Florida, Georgia, South Carolina and Texas
- Five: Michigan and North Carolina
- Six: California and Maryland
- Seven: Wisconsin
- Nine: New York
- Ten: Virginia
- Twenty: Pennsylvania
- Forty-three: Delaware

International

- 5 trips, 7 countries

Locations in the contiguous United States that President Joe Biden has visited in 2024 and in January 2025.

January (blue) – February (yellow) – March (brown) – April (pink) – May (grey) – June (orange) – July (purple) – August (light blue) – September (magenta) – October (green) – November (red) – December (light green) –

January ‘25 (gold)
Locations in US Virgin Islands that President Joe Biden has visited.

== January 2024 ==
Country/ U.S. state	Areas visited	Dates	Details	Image
U.S. Virgin Islands	St. Croix	January 1–2	President Biden, First Lady Jill Biden and their granddaughter Natalie continued their vacation in St. Croix for New Year's Holiday and they stayed at the private residence of Bill and Connie Neville.	
Pennsylvania	Valley Forge, Blue Bell	January 5	Arriving via Wilmington-New Castle Airport and flying to Valley Forge Landing Zone on Marine One, President Biden and First Lady Jill Biden participated in a wreath laying ceremony at the National Memorial Arch and visited Washington's Headquarters. Then he delivered remarks at a political event on the 3rd anniversary of the U.S. Capitol attack at Montgomery County Community College.	
Delaware	Wilmington, Greenville	January 5–8	Flying from Wings Field Landing Zone to Wilmington-New Castle Airport on Marine One, President Biden and First Lady Jill Biden visited their Delaware home for the weekend. On Saturday, President Biden visited the Fieldstone Golf Club for lunch with former Senator Ted Kaufman and attended Mass at St. Joseph on the Brandywine in Greenville.	
South Carolina	Charleston	January 8	Arriving via Charleston Air Force Base, President Biden delivered remarks at a political event at the Emanuel African Methodist Episcopal Church. He stopped by at Hannibal's Kitchen with Congressman Jim Clyburn.	
Texas	Dallas	January 8	Arriving via Dallas Love Field, President Biden paid his respects for Congresswoman Eddie Bernice Johnson at Concord Church.	
Pennsylvania	Emmaus, Allentown	January 12	Arriving via Lehigh Valley International Airport, President Biden visited several small businesses in Emmaus and Allentown Fire Training Academy.	
Pennsylvania	Philadelphia	January 15	Flying from Hagerstown Regional Airport to Philadelphia International Airport, President Biden volunteered at the food bank Philabundance to commemorate the Martin Luther King Jr. Day holiday.	
North Carolina	Raleigh	January 18	Arriving via Raleigh–Durham International Airport, President Biden visited the Research Triangle and delivered remarks on Bidenomics and Investing in America Agenda at Abbotts Creek Community Center. He stopped by at Cook Out and a private residence for campaign visit.	
Delaware	Rehoboth Beach, Wilmington	January 19–22	Arriving via Dover Air Force Base, President Biden visited his Delaware beach home for the weekend. On Saturday, he attended Mass at St. Edmond Catholic Church. On Sunday, President Biden stopped at Egg Restaurant for breakfast then he and First Lady Jill Biden flying from Cape Henlopen State Park to Wilmington-New Castle Airport on Marine One, paid their respect for former Wilmington City Council Ted Blunt at Congo Legacy Center. Then they visited their Delaware home briefly, before returning to Rehoboth Beach.	
Virginia	Manassas	January 23	Arriving via Manassas Regional Airport on Marine One, President Biden and First Lady Dr. Jill Biden held a campaign event at the Hylton Performing Arts Center on the campus of George Mason University. They were joined by Vice President Kamala Harris and Second Gentlemen Doug Emhoff.	
Wisconsin	Superior	January 25	Arriving via Duluth International Airport, President Biden delivered remarks on the Infrastructure Investment and Jobs Act and Investing in America Agenda at Earth Rider Brewery. He visited the John A. Blatnik Bridge and Superior Fire Department.	
South Carolina	Columbia, West Columbia	January 27–28	Arriving via Columbia Metropolitan Airport, President Biden delivered remarks at the First in the Nation Celebration Dinner at South Carolina State Fairgrounds. On January 28, President Biden delivered remarks at a political event at St. John the Baptist Church and Brookland Baptist Church.	
Florida	Jupiter, Miami	January 30	Arriving via Palm Beach International Airport, President Biden participated in a campaign reception in Jupiter. He then flew to Miami International Airport and also participated in a campaign reception at the private residence of Chris Korge.	

== February ==
Country/ U.S. state	Areas visited	Dates	Details	Image
Michigan	Harper Woods, Dearborn, Warren	February 1	Arriving via Selfridge Air National Guard Base, President Biden stopped by at They Say Restaurant in Harper Woods. He delivered remarks at a political event and met with UAW members at UAW Region 1 ahead of the Michigan Democratic Primary. He then participated in a political meeting at Simple Palate Restaurant in Warren.	
Delaware	Wilmington, Dover, Greenville	February 1–3	Arriving via Philadelphia International Airport and flying to Wilmington-New Castle Airport on Marine One, President Biden visited his Delaware home for the weekend. On Friday, President Biden and First Lady Dr. Jill Biden attended the dignified transfer at Dover Air Force Base of the bodies of the 3 Reservists killed in the Tower 22 drone attack. On Saturday, President Biden and First Lady Dr. Jill Biden visited the graveside of their son Beau Biden and other family members at St. Joseph on the Brandywine in Greenville. Then they, Vice President Harris, Second Gentleman Doug Emhoff and Campaign Manager Julie Chavez Rodriguez made a surprise appearance at their Campaign Headquarters.	
California	Bel Air	February 3–4	Flying from Wilmington-New Castle Airport to Philadelphia International Airport on Marine One and flying from Los Angeles International Airport to Santa Monica Airport on Marine One, President Biden met with Black entertainment industry leaders in Bel Air.	
Nevada	Henderson, Las Vegas	February 4–5	Arriving via Harry Reid International Airport, President Biden participated in a fundraiser event in Henderson. He held a campaign rally at Pearson Community Center ahead of the Nevada Democratic Primary. On February 5, President Biden met with Local 226 Culinary hospitality workers at Vdara Hotel.	
New York	New York City	February 7	Arriving via John F. Kennedy International Airport and flying to the Downtown Manhattan Heliport on Marine One, President Biden participated in three campaign receptions in Manhattan, the first event at the private residence of Larry Linden, the second event at the Mandarin Oriental and the third event at the private residence of Maureen White and Steve Rattner.	
Virginia	Leesburg	February 8	Arriving via Leesburg Executive Airport on Marine One, President Biden delivered remarks at the House Democratic Caucus Issues Conference at Lansdowne Resort.	
Delaware	Wilmington, Greenville	February 9–11	Arriving via Wilmington-New Castle Airport on Marine One, President Biden visited his Delaware home for the weekend. On Saturday, President Biden attended Mass at St. Joseph on the Brandywine in Greenville.	
Pennsylvania	Darlington	February 16	Arriving via Pittsburgh International Airport, President Biden stopped at Darlington Municipal Complex before heading to East Palestine.	
Ohio	East Palestine	February 16	President Biden received an operational briefing from officials on the continuing response and recovery efforts of the Ohio train derailment. He met with community leaders and local residents impacted by the derailment. He delivered remarks on accountability for the derailment and is working with state and local officials to support the community.	
Delaware	Rehoboth Beach	February 16–19	Arriving via Dover Air Force Base and flying to Cape Henlopen State Park on Marine One, President Biden visited his Delaware beach home for President's Day weekend. On Saturday, President Biden stopped by at Henlopen City Oyster House for lunch and attended Mass at St. Edmond Catholic Church.	
California	Los Angeles, Culver City, San Francisco, Los Altos Hills	February 20–22	Arriving via Los Angeles International Airport and flying to Santa Monica Airport on Marine One, President Biden was scheduled to participate in a campaign reception at the private residence of Haim and Cheryl Saban co-sponsored by Casey Wasserman, a sports management executive and chairman of the LA 2028 Olympic Games planning group. On February 21, President Biden delivered remarks on canceling student debt at Culver City Julian Dixon Library. He then was scheduled to fly from Los Angeles International Airport to San Francisco International Airport on Air Force One and on to Marina Green Parking Lot Landing Zone on Marine One to participate in two campaign receptions in San Francisco. On February 22, arriving via Moffett Federal Airfield in Santa Clara County on Marine One, President Biden participated in a campaign reception in Los Altos Hills. Biden also met in San Francisco with Yulia Navalnaya and Daria Navalnaya to express his condolences for the death of Alexei Navalny.	
New York	New York City	February 26	Arriving via John F. Kennedy International Airport and flying to the Downtown Manhattan Heliport on Marine One, President Biden participated in a campaign reception in New York City. He taped his appearance on Late Night with Seth Meyers at 30 Rockefeller Plaza.	
Maryland	Bethesda	February 28	President Biden flew on Marine One to Walter Reed National Military Medical Center for his annual physical examination.	
Texas	Brownsville	February 29	Arriving via Brownsville/South Padre Island International Airport, President Biden visited the U.S.–Mexico border and met with the United States Border Patrol agents and to advocate for the passage of the Senate border agreement. He delivered remarks at the Border Patrol Brownsville Station.	

== March ==
Country/ U.S. state	Areas visited	Dates	Details	Image
Pennsylvania	Rose Valley, Swarthmore, Wallingford	March 8	Arriving via Philadelphia International Airport, President Biden and First Lady Dr. Jill Biden visited a private residence in Rose Valley and a small business in Swarthmore. They then held a campaign event at Strath Haven Middle School.	
Delaware	Wilmington	March 8–9	Arriving via Wilmington-New Castle Airport on Marine One, President Biden and First Lady Dr. Jill Biden visited their Delaware home for the weekend.	
Georgia	Atlanta	March 9	Arriving via Hartsfield–Jackson Atlanta International Airport, President Biden and First Lady Dr. Jill Biden held a campaign event at Pullman Yards, ahead of the Georgia Democratic Primary.	
Delaware	Wilmington, Greenville	March 9–11	Arriving via Philadelphia International Airport and flying to Wilmington-New Castle Airport on Marine One, President Biden and First Lady Dr. Jill Biden returned to Wilmington to spend the remainder of the weekend at their Delaware home. On Sunday, President Biden attended Mass at St. Joseph on the Brandywine in Greenville.	
New Hampshire	Goffstown, Manchester	March 11	Arriving via Manchester–Boston Regional Airport, President Biden delivered remarks on lowering costs for American families at YMCA Allard Center. He then participated in a campaign event at New Hampshire Campaign Office.	
Wisconsin	Milwaukee	March 13–14	Arriving via Milwaukee Mitchell International Airport, President Biden delivered remarks on how his investments are rebuilding our communities and creating good-paying jobs at the Pieper-Hillside Boys & Girls Club. He then participated in a campaign event at the campaign headquarters in Milwaukee. He spent the night at The Pfister Hotel.	
Michigan	Saginaw	March 14	Arriving via MBS International Airport, President Biden participated in a campaign events at the private residence in Saginaw and Pleasant View Golf Course.	
Nevada	Reno, Las Vegas	March 19	Arriving via Nevada Air National Guard, President Biden participated in a campaign event at the headquarters of the Democratic Party of Washoe County. He then flew to Harry Reid International Airport and delivered remarks on lowering costs for American families at The Stupak Community Center.	
Arizona	Phoenix, Chandler	March 19–20	Arriving via Phoenix Sky Harbor International Airport, President Biden participated in a campaign event at El Portal Restaurant. On March 20, President Biden toured and delivered remarks on his Investing in America agenda at Intel Ocotillo Campus.	
Texas	Dallas, Houston	March 20–21	Arriving via Dallas Fort Worth International Airport, President Biden participated in two campaign receptions in Dallas. He spent the night at Dallas Fairmount Hotel. On March 21, arriving via Ellington Field Joint Reserve Base, President Biden participated in a campaign reception in Houston.	
Delaware	Wilmington, Greenville	March 22–24	Arriving via Wilmington-New Castle Airport on Marine One, President Biden visited his Delaware home for the weekend. On Saturday, President Biden attended Palm Sunday Mass at St. Joseph on the Brandywine in Greenville.	
North Carolina	Raleigh	March 26	Arriving via Raleigh-Durham International Airport, President Biden and Vice President Kamala Harris delivered remarks on lowering healthcare costs at Chavis Community Center. They participated in a campaign reception at Raleigh Marriott City Center.	
New York	New York City	March 28–29	Arriving via John F. Kennedy International Airport and flying to the Downtown Manhattan Heliport on Marine One, President Biden and First Lady Dr. Jill Biden participated in a campaign reception at Radio City Music Hall with Democratic former presidents Bill Clinton and Barack Obama. He spent the night at the JW Marriott Essex House. On March 29, President Biden participated in a campaign reception at the InterContinental New York Barclay Hotel. He and First Lady Dr. Jill Biden traveled to Camp David via Hagerstown Regional Airport for Easter weekend.	

== April ==
Country/ U.S. state	Areas visited	Dates	Details	Image
Maryland	Baltimore	April 5	President Biden received an aerial tour on Marine One on the collapse of the Francis Scott Key Bridge. He delivered remarks on rebuild the Francis Scott Key Bridge and reopen the Port of Baltimore, met with federal personnel, state and local officials, and first responders and also met with the loved ones of the six individuals who died at the Maryland Transportation Authority.	
Delaware	Wilmington, Greenville	April 5–8	Flying from Martin State Airport to Wilmington-New Castle Airport on Marine One, President Biden visited his Delaware home for the weekend. On Saturday, President Biden attended Mass at St. Joseph on the Brandywine in Greenville.	
Wisconsin	Madison	April 8	Flying from Wilmington-New Castle Airport to Philadelphia International Airport on Marine One and flying to Dane County Regional Airport on Air Force One, President Biden delivered remarks on student loan debt relief at Madison Area Technical College Truax Campus.	
Illinois	Chicago	April 8	Arriving via O'Hare International Airport and flying to Soldier Field Landing Zone on Marine One, President Biden participated in a campaign meeting at The Drake Hotel and a campaign reception in Chicago.	
Delaware	Rehoboth Beach	April 12–13	Arriving via Dover Air Force Base and flying to Cape Henlopen State Park on Marine One, President Biden visited his Delaware beach home for the weekend. He was originally scheduled to stay until April 14, but the trip was cut short a day early amid Iranian strikes on Israel.	
Pennsylvania	Scranton, Pittsburgh	April 16–17	Arriving via Wilkes-Barre/Scranton International Airport, President Biden participated in two campaign events in Scranton at the Scranton Cultural Center at the Masonic Temple and Carpenters Local Union 445. He stopped at his childhood home and spent the night at the Radisson Lackawanna Station Hotel. On April 17, President Biden stopped at Zummo's Cafe and Scranton Veterans Memorial on the campus of Scranton High School in honor of his uncle Ambrose J. Finnegan Jr. He then flew to Pittsburgh International Airport and participated in a campaign event at the headquarters of the United Steelworkers. He stopped at Sheetz Store.	
Pennsylvania	Philadelphia	April 18	Arriving via Philadelphia International Airport, President Biden participated in a campaign event at Martin Luther King Recreation Center. He also stopped at Wawa Store with Philadelphia Mayor Cherelle Parker.	
Delaware	Wilmington, Greenville	April 19–22	Arriving via Wilmington-New Castle Airport on Marine One, President Biden visited his Delaware home for the weekend. On Saturday, President Biden attended Mass at St. Joseph on the Brandywine in Greenville.	
Virginia	Triangle	April 22	Arriving via Marine Corps Air Facility Quantico on Marine One, President Biden delivered remarks to commemorate Earth Day at Prince William Forest Park with Vermont Senator Bernie Sanders and New York Representative Alexandria Ocasio-Cortez.	
Florida	Tampa	April 23	Arriving via Tampa International Airport, President Biden delivered remarks on Abortion ban and participated in a campaign event at Hillsborough Community College – Dale Mabry Campus.	
New York	Syracuse, Irvington, New York City	April 25–26	Arriving via Hancock Field Air National Guard Base, President Biden delivered remarks on the CHIPS and Science Act and his Investment in America at the Milton J. Rubenstein Museum of Science and Technology. He then was scheduled to fly from Hancock Field Air National Guard Base to John F. Kennedy International Airport on Air Force One and on to Westchester County Airport on Marine One to participate in a campaign event at the private residence of Michael Douglas and Catherine Zeta-Jones in Irvington. He then flew to the Downtown Manhattan Heliport on Marine One and spent the night at the InterContinental New York Barclay Hotel.	
Delaware	Greenville	April 30	Arriving via Wilmington-New Castle Airport on Marine One, President Biden participated in a campaign event at Alexis I. duPont High School.	

== May ==
Country/ U.S. state	Areas visited	Dates	Details	Image
North Carolina	Charlotte, Wilmington	May 2	Arriving via Charlotte Douglas International Airport, President Biden paid his respects following the mass shooting which occurred on April 29 and claimed the lives of five people including the perpetrator, and met with families of the fallen heroes, the wounded law enforcement officers, and other law enforcement officers and elected officials. He then flew to Wilmington International Airport and delivered remarks on how his Investing in America agenda and how it is rebuilding infrastructure and creating jobs at Wilmington Convention Center.	
Delaware	Wilmington, Greenville	May 3–6	Arriving via Wilmington-New Castle Airport on Marine One, President Biden visited his Delaware home for the weekend. On Saturday, President Biden visited at Fieldstone Golf Club for lunch and attended mass at St. Joseph on the Brandywine in Greenville.	
Wisconsin	Sturtevant, Racine	May 8	Arriving via Milwaukee Mitchell International Airport, President Biden delivered remarks at Gateway Technical College on his Investing in America agenda and joined Microsoft President Brad Smith in announcing an expansion of Microsoft's data server campus in Racine County. He then participated in a campaign event at the Dr. John Bryant Community Center in Racine.	
Illinois	Chicago	May 8	Arriving via O'Hare International Airport and flying to Soldier Field Landing Zone on Marine One, President Biden participated in a campaign reception at the Palmer House Hilton.	
California	San Francisco, Portola Valley, Palo Alto	May 9–10	Arriving via Moffett Federal Airfield and flying to Marina Green Parking Lot Landing Zone on Marine One, President Biden spent the night at the Fairmont San Francisco. On May 10, arriving via SLAC Landing Zone on Marine One, President Biden participated two campaign receptions, the first event at the private residence of Vinod Khosla, co-founder of Sun Microsystems and the founder of Khosla Ventures in Portola Valley and the second event at the private residence of Marissa Mayer, the former CEO of Yahoo! in Palo Alto.	
Washington	Seattle, Medina	May 10–11	Arriving via Seattle-Tacoma International Airport, President Biden participated in a campaign reception at Lotte Hotel Seattle. He spent the night at the Westin Seattle. On May 11, President Biden participated in a campaign reception in Medina.	
Delaware	Rehoboth Beach	May 11–13	Arriving via Dover Air Force Base, President Biden visited his Delaware beach home for the weekend. On Sunday, President Biden attended Mass at St. Edmond Catholic Church.	
Georgia	Atlanta	May 18–19	Arriving via Hartsfield–Jackson Atlanta International Airport, President Biden participated two campaign receptions, the first event at Mary Mac's Tea Room and the second event at the Arthur M. Blank Family Foundation. On May 19, President Biden delivered the Commencement Address at Morehouse College.	
Michigan	Detroit	May 19	Arriving via Detroit Metropolitan Airport, President Biden participated in a campaign reception at Cred Cafe. He then delivered remarks at the NAACP Fight for Freedom Fund dinner at Huntington Place.	
Delaware	Wilmington	May 19–20	Arriving via Philadelphia International Airport and flying to Wilmington-New Castle Airport on Marine One, President Biden spent the remainder of the weekend at his Delaware home.	
New Hampshire	Merrimack, Nashua	May 21	Arriving via Manchester–Boston Regional Airport, President Biden stopped at Merrimack Veterans of Foreign Wars Post 8641. He delivered remarks on the PACT Act at Westwood Park YMCA.	
Massachusetts	Boston	May 21	Arriving via Boston Logan International Airport, President Biden participated in two campaign receptions, the first event at Haddon Hall and the second event at Seaport Hotel.	
Delaware	Wilmington	May 24–25	Flying from Fort Lesley J. McNair to Wilmington-New Castle Airport on Marine One, President Biden and First Lady Dr. Jill Biden visited their Delaware home for Memorial Day weekend.	
New York	West Point	May 25	Arriving via Stewart Air National Guard Base and flying to West Point Landing Zone on Marine One, President Biden delivered the Commencement Address at Michie Stadium on the campus of the United States Military Academy.	
Delaware	Wilmington, Greenville	May 25–26	Arriving via Wilmington-New Castle Airport, President Biden returned to Wilmington to spend the remainder of Memorial Day weekend at his Delaware home. Upon arrival, he attended Mass at St. Joseph on the Brandywine and stopped by at Jos. A. Bank outlet in Greenville. On Sunday, President Biden visited his daughter-in-law Hallie Olivere Biden's home.	
Virginia	Arlington	May 27	President Biden and First Lady Dr. Jill Biden participated in a wreath-laying ceremony at the Tomb of the Unknown Soldier in Arlington National Cemetery on Memorial Day. They were joined by Vice President Kamala Harris, Second Gentleman Doug Emhoff, Secretary of Defense Lloyd Austin and Chairman of the Joint Chiefs of Staff Charles Q. Brown Jr. President Biden delivered the Memorial Day address at the Memorial Amphitheater.	
Pennsylvania	Philadelphia	May 29	Arriving via Philadelphia International Airport, President Biden and Vice President Kamala Harris participated in a campaign event at Girard College. President Biden also participated in campaign event at the SouthSide Restaurant.	
Delaware	Wilmington, Greenville, New Castle, Rehoboth Beach	May 29–31	President Biden took a motorcade to Wilmington to spend the night at his Delaware home. On Thursday, President Biden, First Lady Dr. Jill Biden and other family members attended Mass and visited the burial site of their late son Beau Biden at their home parish, St. Joseph on the Brandywine in Greenville on the ninth anniversary of his death. They also visited and paid his respects at Veterans Memorial Park. They are then flying from Wilmington-New Castle Airport to Cape Henlopen State Park on Marine One to spend the long weekend at their Delaware beach home until Sunday. On Friday, President Biden briefly returned to Washington for the afternoon before he returned to Rehoboth Beach.	
Delaware	Rehoboth Beach	May 31	Flying from Fort Lesley J. McNair to Cape Henlopen State Park on Marine One, President Biden returned to Rehoboth Beach to continued his long weekend stay at his Delaware beach home.	

== June ==
Country/ U.S. state	Areas visited	Dates	Details	Image
Delaware	Rehoboth Beach, Wilmington	June 1–3	President Biden continued his weekend stay at his Delaware beach home. On Saturday, President Biden and his son Hunter Biden went on a bike ride at Cape Henlopen State Park and attended Mass at St. Edmond Catholic Church. On Sunday, President Biden and First Lady Dr. Jill Biden flew to Dover Air Force Base on Marine One, to spend the remainder of the long weekend at their Delaware home.	
Connecticut	Greenwich	June 3	Arriving via Westchester County Airport, President Biden participated in a campaign reception at the private residence of Richard Plepler, former CEO of HBO.	
France	Normandy, Paris, Belleau	June 5–9	Arriving via Orly Airport, President Biden spent the night in Paris. On June 6, arriving via Caen – Carpiquet Airport and flying to Normandy American Cemetery Landing Zone on Marine One, President Biden and First Lady Dr. Jill Biden attended the 80th Anniversary of D-Day memorial ceremonies and participated in a wreath-laying ceremony at Normandy American Cemetery and Memorial. They also attended the D-Day Anniversary International Ceremony at Omaha Beach. On June 7, President Biden held a bilateral meeting with Ukrainian President Volodymyr Zelenskyy at the InterContinental Paris Le Grand Hotel. He then returned to Normandy to delivered remarks on freedom and democracy at Pointe du Hoc. On June 8, President Biden and First Lady Dr. Jill Biden participated in a welcome ceremony with French President Emmanuel Macron and First Lady Brigitte Macron at the Arc de Triomphe and held a bilateral meeting at the Élysée Palace. On June 9, President Biden and First Lady Dr. Jill Biden visited the U.S. Chief of Mission Residence. They then flew to Château-Thierry – Belleau Aerodrome on Marine One to paid their respects and participated in a wreath-laying ceremony at the Aisne-Marne American Cemetery.	
Delaware	Wilmington	June 9–10	Arriving via Philadelphia International Airport and flying to Wilmington-New Castle Airport on Marine One, President Biden and First Lady Dr. Jill Biden visited their Delaware home for the remainder of the weekend.	
Delaware	Wilmington	June 11–12	Arriving via Wilmington-New Castle Airport on Marine One, President Biden spent the night at his Delaware home with his son Hunter Biden following his conviction in his trial.	
Italy	Fasano	June 12–14	Arriving via Brindisi Airport, President Biden spent the night at Masseria San Domenico Hotel. On June 13, President Biden attended the G7 summit and held a bilateral meeting with Ukrainian President Volodymyr Zelenskyy at Borgo Egnazia. On June 14, President Biden held a bilateral meeting with Prime Minister Giorgia Meloni and met with Pope Francis.	
California	Los Angeles	June 15–16	Arriving via Los Angeles International Airport, President Biden and First Lady Dr. Jill Biden participated in a campaign reception with former President Barack Obama, George Clooney, Julia Roberts and Jimmy Kimmel hosted the event at the Peacock Theater. They spent the night at W Hotel Los Angeles.	
Virginia	McLean	June 18	President Biden and First Lady Dr. Jill Biden participated in a campaign reception with former President Bill Clinton and former Secretary of State Hillary Clinton at the private residence of former Virginia Governor Terry McAuliffe.	
Delaware	Rehoboth Beach	June 18–20	Flying from Fort Lesley J. McNair to Cape Henlopen State Park on Marine One, President Biden and First Lady Dr. Jill Biden visited their Delaware beach home for Juneteenth holiday. On Thursday, President Biden traveled to Camp David and spent a week there until June 27 to prepare for the first presidential debate.	
Georgia	Atlanta	June 27	Arriving via Dobbins Air Reserve Base, President Biden participated in the first presidential debate, along with presumptive Republican nominee former President Donald Trump at Techwood Turner Campus. President Biden and First Lady Dr. Jill Biden later dropped by a campaign event at the Hyatt Regency Atlanta and also stopped by at Waffle House after the debate.	
North Carolina	Raleigh	June 28	Arriving via Raleigh–Durham International Airport, President Biden and First Lady Dr. Jill Biden participated in a campaign event at North Carolina State Fair.	
New York	New York City, East Hampton	June 28–29	Arriving via John F. Kennedy International Airport and flying to the Downtown Manhattan Heliport on Marine One, President Biden and First Lady Dr. Jill Biden delivered remarks at the Stonewall National Monument Visitor Center Grand Opening Ceremony with Elton John. They participated in a campaign reception at the Manhattan Center. On June 29, flying from LaGuardia International Airport to Francis S. Gabreski Airport, President Biden and First Lady Dr. Jill Biden participated two campaign receptions in East Hampton.	
New Jersey	Red Bank	June 29	Arriving via McGuire Air Force Base and flying to Fort Monmouth Landing Zone on Marine One, President Biden and First Lady Dr. Jill Biden participated in a campaign reception at the private residence of New Jersey Governor Phil Murphy. Then, they traveled to Camp David via Hagerstown Regional Airport for the weekend.	

== July ==
Country/ U.S. state	Areas visited	Dates	Details	Image
Virginia	McLean	July 2	President Biden participated in a campaign reception at the private residence of Renée Fleming.	
Wisconsin	Madison	July 5	Arriving via Dane County Regional Airport, President Biden participated in a campaign event at Sherman Middle School.	
Delaware	Wilmington, Greenville	July 5–7	Arriving via Wilmington-New Castle Airport, President Biden visited his Delaware home for the weekend. On Saturday, President Biden attended mass at St. Joseph on the Brandywine in Greenville.	
Pennsylvania	Philadelphia, Harrisburg	July 7	Arriving via Philadelphia International Airport on Marine One, President Biden participated in a campaign event at Mt. Airy Church of God in Christ and stopped by at Roxborough Democratic Coordinated Campaign Office. He then flew to Harrisburg International Airport and also participated with First Lady Dr. Jill Biden in a campaign event at the campaign headquarters in Harrisburg. President Biden then stopped by at Denim Coffee.	
Michigan	Northville, Detroit	July 12	Arriving via Detroit Metropolitan Airport, President Biden visited Garage Grill and Fuel Bar. He then participated in a campaign event at Renaissance High School.	
Delaware	Rehoboth Beach	July 12–14	Arriving via Dover Air Force Base, President Biden visited his Delaware beach home for the weekend. On Saturday, President Biden attended Mass at St. Edmond Catholic Church. He delivered remarks on the assassination attempt of former President and presumptive Republican presidential nominee Donald Trump at the Rehoboth Beach Convention Center. He then cut short his trip and returned immediately to Washington, D.C. in response to the attempt.	
Nevada	Las Vegas	July 15–17	Arriving via Harry Reid International Airport, President Biden spent the night in Las Vegas. On July 16, President Biden delivered remarks at the 115th NAACP National Convention at Mandalay Bay. He then participated in an economic summit with Congressman Steven Horsford at the College of Southern Nevada North Las Vegas Campus. He then stopped by at Mario's Westside Market. On July 17, President Biden stopped by at Original Lindo Michoacan. He cut short his trip because he tested positive of COVID-19 and traveled to Rehoboth Beach for isolation of COVID-19.	
Delaware	Rehoboth Beach	July 17–23	Arriving via Dover Air Force Base, President Biden visited his Delaware beach home for isolation of COVID-19. On July 21, he announced his decision to withdraw from his re-election campaign.	
Texas	Austin, Houston	July 29	Arriving via Austin–Bergstrom International Airport, President Biden visited and delivered remarks to commemorate the 60th anniversary of the Civil Rights Act at the Lyndon B. Johnson Presidential Library. He then flew to Ellington Field Joint Reserve Base to pay his respect for Congresswoman Sheila Jackson Lee at the Houston City Hall.	

== August ==
Country/ U.S. state	Areas visited	Dates	Details	Image
Maryland	Prince George's County	August 1	President Biden and Vice President Kamala Harris traveled to Joint Base Andrews where they met and greeted Americans freed from Russia.	
Delaware	Wilmington, Greenville	August 2–5	Arriving via Wilmington-New Castle Airport on Marine One, President Biden visited his Delaware home for the weekend. On Saturday, President Biden attended mass at St. Joseph on the Brandywine in Greenville. On Sunday, President Biden stopped at Hallie Biden's home for dinner of celebration of his granddaughter Natalie's 20th birthday.	
Delaware	Wilmington, Rehoboth Beach	August 8–12	Arriving via Wilmington-New Castle Airport, President Biden and First Lady Dr. Jill Biden visited at The Queen Theatre for campaign headquarters for the first after he dropped out of the 2024 United States presidential election. Then, they flew to Dover Air Force Base and visited their Delaware beach home for the weekend. On Saturday, President Biden spent the day at the beach and attended Mass at St. Edmond Catholic Church. On Sunday, President Biden he went on a bike ride at Cape Henlopen State Park.	
Louisiana	New Orleans	August 13	Arriving via Louis Armstrong New Orleans International Airport, President Biden and First Lady Dr. Jill Biden toured and delivered remarks at a Biden Cancer Moonshot at the Freeman School of Business on the campus of Tulane University.	
Maryland	Largo	August 15	President Biden and Vice President Kamala Harris delivered remarks on lowering prescription drug costs for American families at Prince George's Community College. They were joined by Maryland Governor Wes Moore and Prince George's County Executive Angela Alsobrooks.	
Pennsylvania	Philadelphia	August 16	President Biden made an unannounced visit to the University of Pennsylvania with his grandson Hunter, son of Beau Biden. He then traveled to Camp David via Hagerstown Regional Airport for the weekend.	
Illinois	Chicago	August 19	Arriving via O'Hare International Airport and flying to Soldier Field on Marine One, President Biden and First Lady Dr. Jill Biden delivered remarks at the 2024 Democratic National Convention at the United Center.	
California	Santa Ynez, Solvang	August 20–25	Arriving via Santa Barbara Airport, President Biden, his family traveled to Santa Ynez for their summer vacation, staying at the home of Joe Kiani. On Saturday, President Biden and other family members attended Mass at Old Mission Santa Inés.	
Delaware	Rehoboth Beach	August 25–31	Arriving via Dover Air Force Base and flying to Cape Henlopen State Park on Marine One, President Biden, First Lady Dr. Jill Biden and other family members visited their Delaware beach home to continue their summer vacation. On Wednesday, President Biden and First Lady Dr. Jill Biden spent the day at the beach. On Saturday, they spent the day at the beach and attended Mass at St. Edmond Catholic Church.	

== September ==
Country/ U.S. state	Areas visited	Dates	Details	Image
Delaware	Rehoboth Beach	September 1–2	President Biden and First Lady Dr. Jill Biden continued their summer vacation at their Delaware beach home.	
Pennsylvania	Pittsburgh	September 2	Arriving via Pittsburgh International Airport, President Biden held a campaign event with Kamala Harris at the International Brotherhood of Electrical Workers Local 5.	
Wisconsin	Westby	September 5	Arriving via La Crosse Regional Airport and flying to Westby Business Park Landing Zone on Marine One, President Biden delivered remarks on Investing in America agenda at Vernon Electric Cooperative.	
Michigan	Ann Arbor	September 6	Arriving via Detroit Metropolitan Airport, President Biden delivered remarks on Investing in America agenda at UA Local 190 Training Center.	
Delaware	Wilmington, Greenville	September 6–9	Arriving via Philadelphia International Airport and flying to Wilmington-New Castle Airport on Marine One, President Biden visited his Delaware home for the weekend. On Saturday President Biden visited the Fieldstone Golf Club for lunch and attended Mass at St. Joseph on the Brandywine in Greenville.	
New York	New York City	September 10–11	Arriving via John F. Kennedy International Airport and flying to the Downtown Manhattan Heliport on Marine One, President Biden stopped at Campagnola for dinner to celebrated his granddaughter Finnegan's birthday. He spent the night at the JW Marriott Essex House. On September 11, President Biden and Vice President Kamala Harris participated in a memorial ceremony at the National September 11 Memorial & Museum along with former President and Republican presidential nominee Donald Trump and his running mate Senator JD Vance.	
Pennsylvania	Shanksville	September 11	Arriving via Johnstown–Cambria County Airport, and flying to the Flight 93 National Memorial on Marine One, President Biden and Vice President Kamala Harris participated in a wreath-laying ceremony in honoring the victims of United Airlines Flight 93 which crashed into a field in Somerset County on September 11, 2001. They stopped at Shanksville Volunteer Fire Department.	
Virginia	Arlington	September 11	Arriving at The Pentagon on Marine One, President Biden and Vice President Kamala Harris participated in a wreath-laying ceremony at the Pentagon Memorial to commemorate the twenty-third anniversary of the September 11 attacks, accompanied by Secretary of Defense Lloyd Austin and Chairman of the Joint Chiefs of Staff Charles Q. Brown Jr.	
Delaware	Wilmington	September 13–14	Flying from Fort Lesley J. McNair to Wilmington-New Castle Airport on Marine One, President Biden visited his Delaware home for the weekend.	
Delaware	Wilmington	September 16	Arriving via Wilmington-New Castle Airport on Marine One, President Biden visited the Beau Biden Foundation Classic at the DuPont County Club before heading to Philadelphia.	
Pennsylvania	Philadelphia	September 16	Arriving via Philadelphia International Airport on Marine One, President Biden delivered remarks at the National HBCU Week Conference at the Philadelphia Marriott Downtown.	
Delaware	Wilmington, Claymont	September 20–22	Flying from Fort Lesley J. McNair to Wilmington-New Castle Airport on Marine One, President Biden held a bilateral meeting with Australian Prime Minister Anthony Albanese. On Saturday, President Biden hosted members of the QUAD Summit with Australian Prime Minister Anthony Albanese, Indian Prime Minister Narendra Modi and Japanese Prime Minister Fumio Kishida at his Delaware home. They visited at Archmere Academy for dinner.	
New York	New York City	September 23–25	Arriving via John F. Kennedy International Airport and flying to the Downtown Manhattan Heliport on Marine One, President Biden spent the night in New York City. He stopped at the Clinton Global Initiative to received Global Citizen Award at the Hilton Hotel. On September 24, President Biden addressed at the United Nations General Assembly at the Headquarters of the United Nations. He held bilateral meeting with United Nations Secretary-General António Guterres. He delivered remarks on climate at the Global Coalition to Address Synthetic Drug Threats at the InterContinental New York Barclay Hotel. He also delivered remarks at the Bloomberg Global Business Forum at the Plaza Hotel. On September 25, President Biden made an appearance on ABC's The View at the Hudson Park. He held a bilateral meeting with Vietnamese Communist Party General Secretary Tô Lâm. He and First Lady Dr. Jill Biden hosted a reception at the Metropolitan Museum of Art.	
Pennsylvania	Scranton	September 27	Arriving via Wilkes-Barre/Scranton International Airport, President Biden attended the funeral of his childhood friend Thomas Bell Sr. at St. Paul Church.	
Delaware	Rehoboth Beach	September 27–29	Arriving via Dover Air Force Base, President Biden visited his Delaware beach home for the weekend. On Saturday, President Biden attended Mass at St. Edmond Catholic Church.	

== October ==
Country/ U.S. state	Areas visited	Dates	Details	Image
South Carolina	Greenville	October 2	Arriving via Greenville–Spartanburg International Airport, President Biden went on an aerial tour on Marine One and surveyed the damages from Hurricane Helene.	
North Carolina	Raleigh, Asheville	October 2	Arriving via Raleigh–Durham International Airport, President Biden received an Operational Briefing at Raleigh Emergency Operations Center. He went on an aerial tour on Marine One to Asheville to visited and surveyed the damages from Hurricane Helene.	
Florida	Perry, Keaton Beach	October 3	Arriving via Tallahassee International Airport, President Biden went on an aerial tour on Marine One to Perry to surveyed the damages from Hurricane Helene. He received an Operational Briefing in Keaton Beach.	
Georgia	Ray City	October 3	Arriving via Moody Air Force Base, President Biden toured area impacted by Hurricane Helene and delivered remarks at Shiloh Pecan Farm.	
Indiana	South Bend	October 5	Arriving via South Bend International Airport, President Biden and First Lady Dr. Jill Biden attended a wedding event at the Basilica of the Sacred Heart on the campus of the University of Notre Dame. They then traveled to Camp David via Hagerstown Regional Airport for the weekend.	
Wisconsin	Milwaukee	October 8	Arriving via Milwaukee Mitchell International Airport, President Biden delivered remarks and discussed on replacing lead pipes and creating good-paying jobs at the Department of Public Works.	
Pennsylvania	Bryn Mawr	October 8	Arriving via Philadelphia International Airport, President Biden held a campaign event for Senator Bob Casey Jr. in Bryn Mawr.	
Florida	St. Petersburg, St. Pete Beach	October 13	Arriving via MacDill Air Force Base, President Biden went on an aerial tour on Marine One to St. Petersburg to surveyed the damages from Hurricane Milton. He received an Operational Briefing in St. Pete Beach.	
Delaware	Wilmington	October 13–15	Arriving via Philadelphia International Airport and flying to Wilmington-New Castle Airport on Marine One, President Biden visited his Delaware home for the remainder of weekend.	
Pennsylvania	Philadelphia	October 15	Arriving via Philadelphia International Airport on Marine One, President Biden delivered remarks at the Democratic City Committee Autumn Dinner at Sheet Metal Workers' Local 19 Banquet Hall.	
Germany	Berlin	October 17–18	Arriving via Berlin Brandenburg Airport, President Biden spent the night in Berlin. On October 18, President Biden met with President Frank-Walter Steinmeier at Bellevue Palace and Chancellor Olaf Scholz at The Chancellery. He participated in a meeting with Chancellor Scholz, French President Emmanuel Macron and British Prime Minister Keir Starmer.	
New Hampshire	Concord	October 22	Arriving via Manchester–Boston Regional Airport, President Biden delivered remarks on lowering prescription drug costs for the American people at NHTI – Concord's Community College. He visited the New Hampshire Democratic Party.	
Arizona	Phoenix	October 24–25	Arriving via Phoenix Sky Harbor International Airport, President Biden spent the night in Phoenix. On October 25, President Biden delivered remarks at the Gila River Indian Community at Gila Crossing Community School.	
Delaware	Wilmington	October 25–26	Arriving via Philadelphia International Airport and flying to Wilmington-New Castle Airport on Marine One, President Biden visited his Delaware home for the weekend.	
Pennsylvania	Pittsburgh	October 26	Arriving via Pittsburgh International Airport, President Biden delivered remarks at the Laborers' International Union of North America Get Out The Vote kick-off event and participated in political event at Laborers' Union Local 1058. He stooped at Allegheny County Labor City Council.	
Delaware	Wilmington, Greenville, New Castle,	October 26–28	Arriving via Wilmington-New Castle Airport, President Biden returned to Wilmington to visited his Delaware home for the remainder of the weekend. Upon arrival, he attended Mass at St. Joseph on the Brandywine and stopped by at Jos. A. Bank outlet in Greenville. On Monday, President Biden stopped at The Legend Restaurant & Bakery for breakfast with Congresswoman Lisa Blunt Rochester. He then cast his ballot by early voting at New Castle County Office Warehouse and Training Center.	
Maryland	Baltimore, Potomac	October 29	Flying from Fort Lesley J. McNair to Port of Baltimore on Marine One, President Biden delivered remarks on how his Investing in America agenda is rebuilding our infrastructure, tackling the climate crisis, and creating good paying union jobs at Dundalk Marine Terminal. He then flew to Bethesda Landing Zone to attend a campaign event with Senatorial candidate Angela Alsobrooks.	

== November ==
Country/ U.S. state	Areas visited	Dates	Details	Image
Pennsylvania	Philadelphia	November 1	Arriving via Philadelphia International Airport, President Biden delivered remarks on his Administration's historic support for unions at UA Sprinkler Fitters Local Union 692.	
Delaware	Wilmington	November 1–2	Arriving via Wilmington-New Castle Airport on Marine One, President Biden visited his Delaware home for the night.	
Pennsylvania	Scranton, Dunmore	November 2	Arriving via Wilkes-Barre/Scranton International Airport, President Biden delivered remarks at a Get Out to Vote event at Carpenters & Joiners Local Union 445. He then participated in a campaign event at the AFSCME Labor Hall.	
Delaware	Wilmington, Greenville	November 2–4	Arriving via Wilmington-New Castle Airport, President Biden returned to Wilmington to visited his Delaware home for the long weekend. Upon arrival, he attended Mass at St. Joseph on the Brandywine in Greenville. On Sunday, President Biden visited the Fieldstone Golf Club for lunch with former Senator Ted Kaufman.	
Delaware	Rehoboth Beach	November 8–10	Flying from Fort Lesley J. McNair to Cape Henlopen State Park on Marine One, President Biden visited his Delaware beach home for the weekend. On Saturday, President Biden attended Mass at St. Edmond Catholic Church. On Sunday, President Biden and First Lady Dr. Jill Biden spent the day at the beach.	
Virginia	Arlington	November 11	President Biden and First Lady Dr. Jill Biden participated Presidential Armed Forces Full Honor wreath-laying ceremony at the Tomb of the Unknown Soldier in Arlington National Cemetery on Veterans Day and he delivered the Veterans Day address at the Memorial Amphitheater.	
Delaware	Claymont, Wilmington	November 11	Arriving via Wilmington-New Castle Airport, President Biden delivered remarks and unveiling bronze plaque in memory of his late son Beau Biden at the Grubb-Worth Mansion. He then visited the graveside of his son Beau Biden at St. Joseph on the Brandywine in Greenville.	
Peru	Lima	November 14–17	Arriving via Jorge Chávez International Airport, President Biden spent the night at JW Marriott Hotel Lima. On November 15, President Biden attended the APEC summit at the Lima Convention Center. He held a trilateral meeting with Japanese Prime Minister Shigeru Ishiba and South Korean President Yoon Suk Yeol. He also held a bilateral meeting with President Dina Boluarte. He also attended the APEC Leaders Gala at the Government Palace. On November 17, President Biden held a bilateral meeting with Chinese President Xi Jinping at Delfines Hotel & Convention Center.	
Brazil	Manaus, Rio de Janeiro	November 17–19	Arriving via Eduardo Gomes International Airport, President Biden went on an aerial tour on Marine One to the Amazon rainforest. He delivered remarks at Museu da Amazônia. He then flew to Rio de Janeiro/Galeão International Airport to spend the night at Hilton Rio de Janeiro Copacabana. On November 18, President Biden attended the G20 summit at the Museum of Modern Art. On November 19, President Biden held a bilateral meeting with President Luiz Inácio Lula da Silva.	
New York	Staten Island	November 25	Arriving via John F. Kennedy International Airport and flew to Miller Field on Marine One, President Biden and First Lady Dr. Jill Biden participated in Thanksgiving Dinner with the United States Coast Guard Sector New York service members and military families as part of the Joining Forces initiative at Fort Wadsworth.	
Massachusetts	Nantucket	November 26–30	Arriving via Nantucket Memorial Airport, President Biden, First Lady Dr. Jill Biden and other family members traveled to Nantucket for the Thanksgiving Holiday and they stayed at David Rubenstein's home. On November 28, President Biden and First Lady Dr. Jill Biden visited at Nantucket Fire Department. On November 29, they attended Christmas tree lighting ceremony. On November 30, they attended Mass at St. Mary, Our Lady of the Isle Catholic Church.	

== December ==
Country/ U.S. state	Areas visited	Dates	Details	Image
Cape Verde	Sal	December 2	President Biden made his final international trip as President. He briefly stopped at Amílcar Cabral International Airport as Air Force One got refueled and met with Prime Minister Ulisses Correia e Silva.	
Angola	Luanda, Lobito	December 2–4	Arriving via Quatro de Fevereiro Airport and greeted with staff and families of U.S. Embassy Luanda, President Biden spent the night in Luanda. On December 3, President Biden held a bilateral meeting with President João Lourenço at the Presidential Palace of Angola. He delivered remarks to honor the past and future of the Angolan-U.S. relationship at the National Museum of Slavery. On December 4, arriving via Catumbela Airport, President Biden toured at the Lobito Port Terminal. He Visited Carrinho Food Processing Factory. He participated in the Lobito Corrridor Trans-Africa Summit.	
Cape Verde	Sal	December 4	Arriving via Amílcar Cabral International Airport, President Biden returned to Cape Verde for brief refueling stop before returning to Washington.	
Delaware	Wilmington, Greenville	December 17–19	Arriving via Wilmington-New Castle Airport on Marine One, President Biden and First Lady Dr. Jill Biden spent the night at their Delaware home. On Wednesday, they attended Mass and visited the burial site of his first wife Neilia Hunter Biden and first daughter Naomi at St. Joseph on the Brandywine in Greenville on their 52nd anniversary of their death.	
U.S. Virgin Islands	St. Croix	December 26–31	Arriving via Henry E. Rohlsen Airport, President Biden, First Lady Dr. Jill Biden and other family members traveled to St. Croix for New Year's Holiday and they stayed at the private residence of Bill and Connie Neville. On Saturday, he attended Mass at Holy Cross Catholic Church. On Sunday, he delivered remarks on the death of former President Jimmy Carter.	
Delaware	Wilmington, Greenville	December 31	Arriving via Philadelphia International Airport and flying to Wilmington-New Castle Airport on Marine One, President Biden and First Lady Dr. Jill Biden visited their Delaware home to continue their New Year's Holiday. Upon arrival, they attended a private event and wedding of their niece Missy Owens at St. Joseph on the Brandywine in Greenville.	
Pennsylvania	Kennett Square	December 31	President Biden and First Lady Dr. Jill Biden attended wedding reception of their niece Missy Owens at Longwood Garden. Then, they returned to Wilmington afterwards.	

== January 2025 ==
Country/ U.S. state	Areas visited	Dates	Details	Image
Delaware	Wilmington	January 1	President Biden and First Lady Dr. Jill Biden continued their New Year's Holiday in Wilmington. Then, they traveled to Camp David for the remainder of New Year's Holiday before returning to the White House on January 2.	
Louisiana	New Orleans	January 6	Arriving via Louis Armstrong International Airport, President Biden and First Lady Dr. Jill Biden traveled to New Orleans following the attack which occurred on New Year's Day and claimed the lives of fifteen people including the perpetrator. They visited the memorial site at Bourbon Street. Then they also attended an Interfaith Prayer Service for Peace and Healing hosted by the Archdiocese of New Orleans at St. Louis Cathedral.	
California	Los Angeles, Santa Monica	January 6–8	Arriving via Los Angeles International Airport and flying to Santa Monica Airport on Marine One, President Biden and First Lady Dr. Jill Biden spent the night in Los Angeles. On January 8, President Biden visited Santa Monica Fire Station to be briefed on the situation of the California wildfires. He and First Lady Dr. Jill Biden visited Cedars-Sinai Medical Center, where their granddaughter Naomi gave birth.	
Virginia	Falls Church	January 13	President Biden attended a celebration of a historic four years with his staff at the State Theatre.	
Virginia	Arlington	January 16	President Biden delivered remarks at the U.S. Department of Defense Commander in Chief Farewell Ceremony at Joint Base Myer–Henderson Hall.	
Maryland	Prince George's County	January 17	President Biden, First Lady Dr. Jill Biden and other family members briefly flew to Joint Base Andrews.	
South Carolina	North Charleston, Charleston	January 19	Arriving via Charleston Air Force Base, President Biden and First Lady Dr. Jill Biden delivered remarks at Royal Missionary Baptist Church. They then toured and also delivered remarks at the International African American Museum at Gadsden's Wharf.	

== See also ==
- List of international presidential trips made by Joe Biden
- Lists of presidential trips made by Joe Biden
