= InterContinental Paris Le Grand Hotel =

Luxury hotel in Paris

Coordinates: 48°52′15″N 2°19′52″E

InterContinental Paris Le Grand
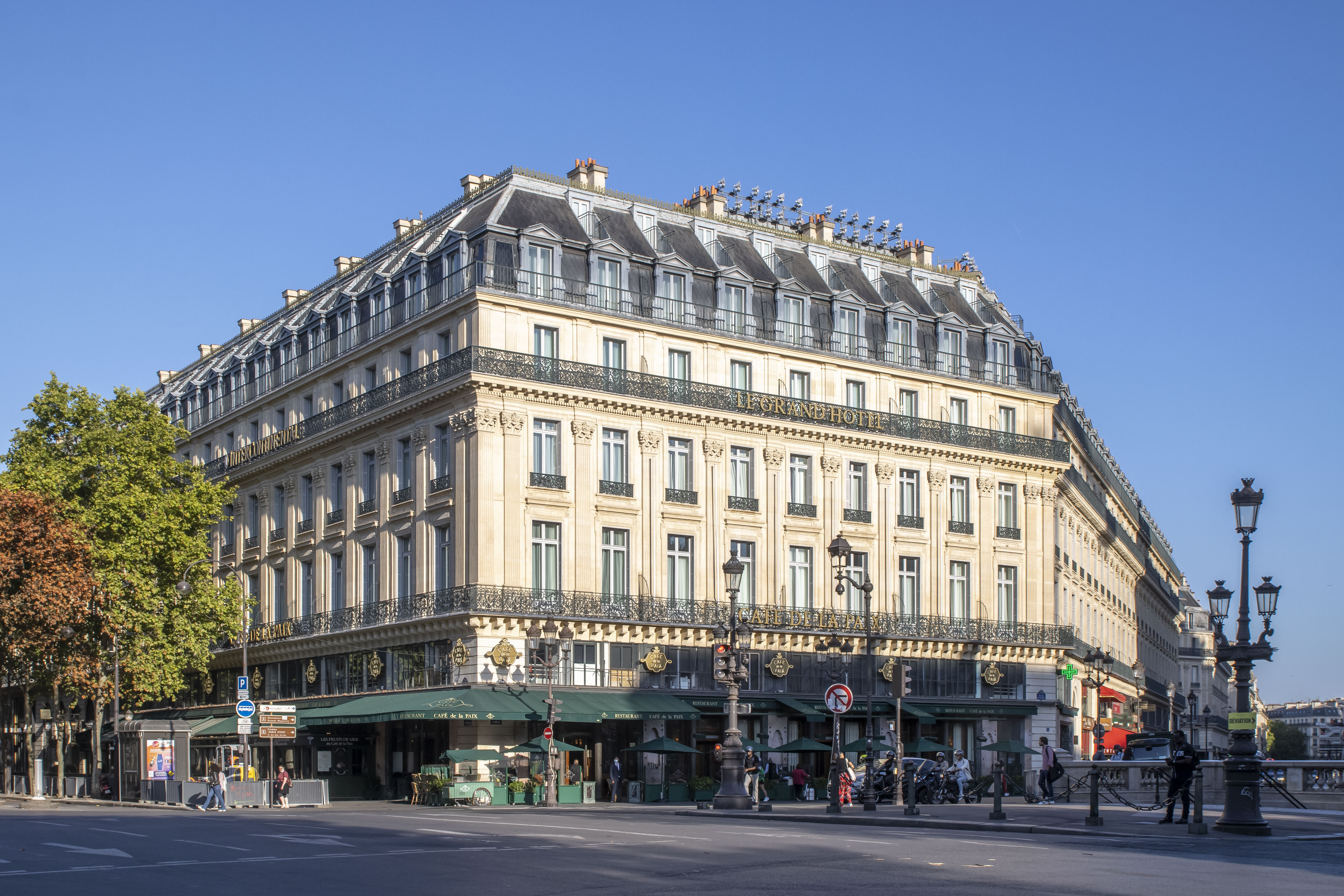
- View of the hotel, showing the Café de la Paix facing the Place de l'Opéra
- Interactive map of the InterContinental Paris Le Grand area

General information
- Location: 9th arrondissement of Paris, France, 2 Rue Scribe
- Opened: 30 June 1862
- Inaugurated: 5 May 1862
- Owner: Constellation Hotels
- Operator: InterContinental

Design and construction
- Architect: Alfred Armand
- Developer: Isaac & Émile Pereire

Other information
- Number of rooms: 470
- Number of suites: 72
- Number of restaurants: 2

Website
- Official website

The InterContinental Paris Le Grand is a historic luxury hotel in Paris, France in Haussmann architecture style which opened in 1862.

== History ==
Le Grand Hôtel was built by the wealthy brothers Isaac & Émile Pereire and designed by Alfred Armand, who had previously designed the nearby Grand Hôtel du Louvre for them. Construction began in April 1861; the hotel was inaugurated on 5 May 1862 by Empress Eugenie, wife of Napoleon III, before officially opening on 30 June 1862. The hotel's construction was part of the complete reconstruction of Paris supervised by Baron Haussmann at the time and it was built in the prescribed style, with a mansard roof. Filling an entire triangular city block, the hotel boasted 800 rooms on four floors for guests, with another whole floor for their servants.

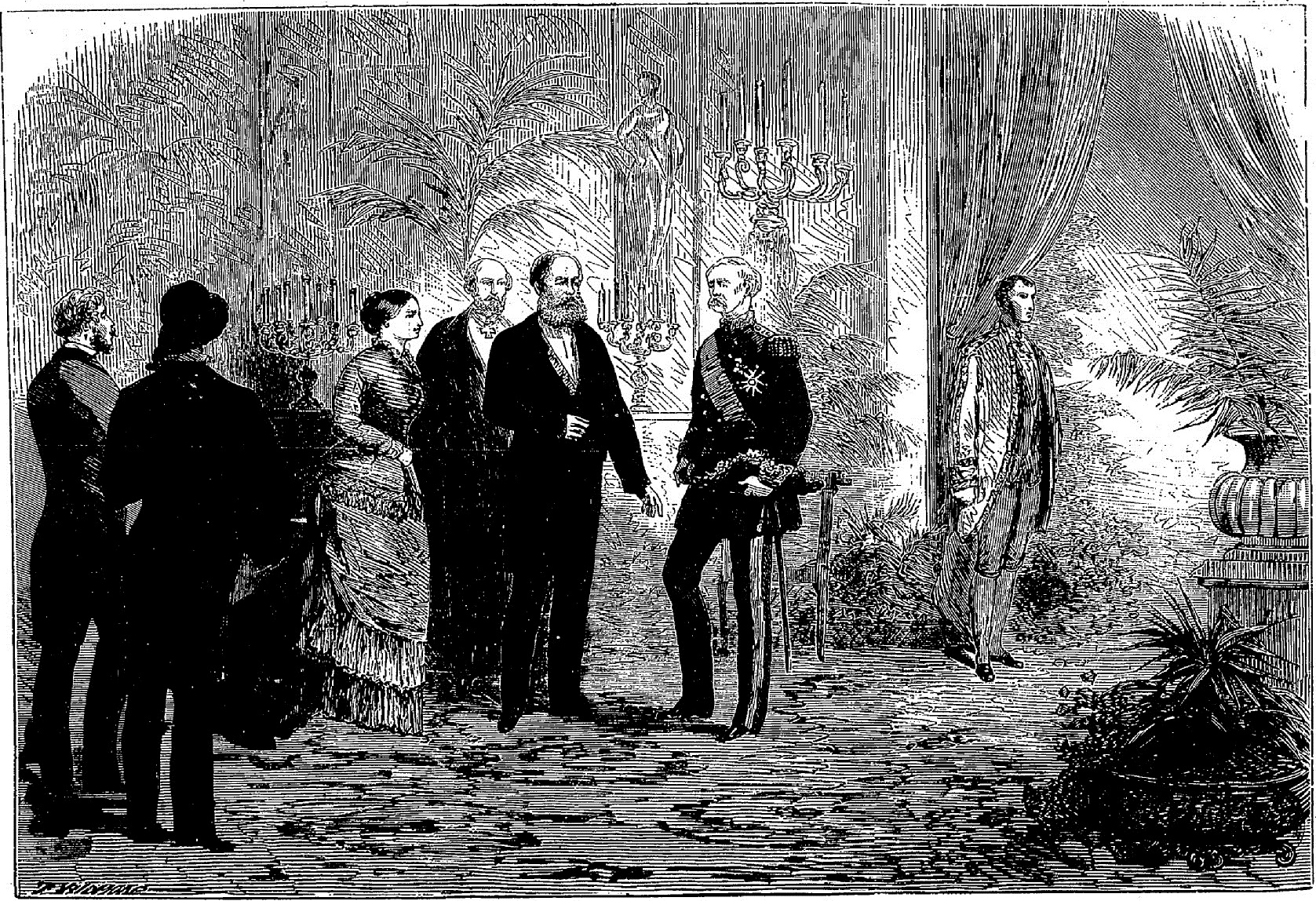
President Mac-Mahon visiting the Emperor and the Empress of Brazil, Pedro II and Teresa Cristina, at the Grand Hotel (L'Univers illustré: journal hebdomadaire, nº 1.153, 28 April 1877).

The hotel has hosted royalty throughout its long history, including Tsar Nicholas and Tsarina Alexandra, King Edward VII of England and Queen Rania of Jordan. Victor Hugo hosted parties at the Le Grand Hotel and Émile Zola used the hotel for the setting of the death of his tragic character Nana.

In 1869, James Gordon Bennett Jr., who would soon become publisher of the Paris Herald, forerunner of the International Herald Tribune, met with Henry Morton Stanley in the hotel's Imperial Suite to convince him to make his famous journey to Africa in search of David Livingstone.

Creditors of the Péreire brothers seized the hotel in 1878, and in 1887, André Million formed Société du Grand Hôtel to manage Le Grand Hotel, along with the nearby Hotel Meurice and later the Hotel Prince de Galles. The Italian CIGA Hotels chain acquired the three hotels in 1972.

CIGA sold the hotels in 1978 for $25 million to Limnico, a Liberia-based subsidiary of Roger Tamraz's First Arabian Corporation. Limnico resold the properties for $55 million just a year later, in October 1979, to Maxwell Joseph's UK-based Grand Metropolitan Hotels. Grand Metropolitan acquired the Inter-Continental Hotels chain in 1981, and placed Le Grand Hotel under their management. The hotel was renovated between 1985 and 1990 by noted French designer Pierre-Yves Rochon.

In 1986, the hotel was renamed Le Grand Hotel Inter-Continental Paris. The hotel closed in December 2001 for another major renovation. Inter-Continental Hotels was reorganised as InterContinental Hotels Group while the hotel was closed. It reopened on 5 April 2003, with its name modified slightly, as InterContinental Paris Le Grand Hotel. InterContinental sold the hotel to Qatar-based Constellation Hotels in 2014 for €330 million, although InterContinental continues to manage the property.

== Café de la Paix ==
The renowned Café de la Paix has been located on the ground floor of the hotel since it opened.

== In popular culture ==
Jean-Luc Godard filmed large portions of his 1965 sci-fi film Alphaville in the hotel, using its driveway, lobby, elevators, hallways and winter garden. Roman Polanski set much of his 1988 film Frantic, starring Harrison Ford, at the hotel. Most interiors were filmed on soundstages, but numerous exterior scenes were filmed outside the hotel.
