= List of international presidential trips made by Joe Biden =

This is a list of international presidential trips made by Joe Biden, the 46th president of the United States. Joe Biden made 21 international trips to 28 countries (in addition to visiting the West Bank) during his presidency, which began on January 20, 2021 and ended on January 20, 2025. Due to the COVID-19 pandemic, Biden did not make any international trips between January and June 2021.

== Summary ==
The number of visits per country where President Biden traveled are:

- One: Angola, Brazil, Cambodia, Canada, Cape Verde, Egypt, Finland, France, India, Indonesia, Ireland, Lithuania, Mexico, Peru, Saudi Arabia, South Korea, Spain, Switzerland, Ukraine, Vatican City, Vietnam and the West Bank
- Two: Belgium, Germany, Israel, Italy, Japan and Poland
- Six: The United Kingdom

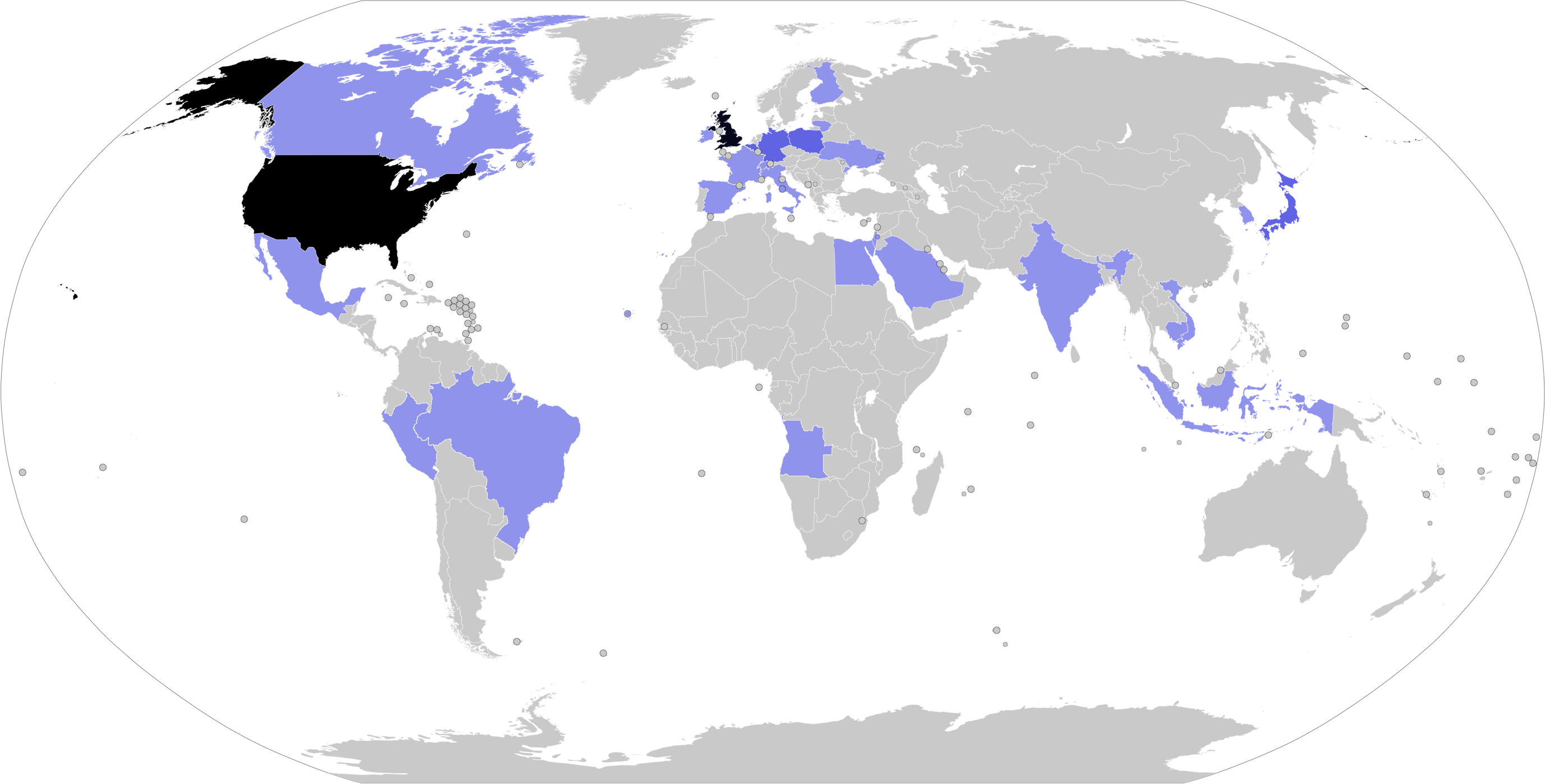
Map of international trips made by Joe Biden as president: United States 6 visits 2 visits 1 visit

== 2021 ==
| # | Country | Areas visited | Dates | Details | Image |
|---|---|---|---|---|---|
| 1 | United Kingdom | Mildenhall, St Ives, Bodelva, Windsor | June 9–13 | Attended the 47th G7 summit at the Carbis Bay Hotel. Met with Queen Elizabeth II at Windsor Castle and Prime Minister Boris Johnson. Both Biden and Johnson issued a revision of the Atlantic Charter which had previously been issued by their predecessors, Franklin Roosevelt and Winston Churchill respectively, eighty years prior. Participated in a meeting with the G7 leaders and other members of the Royal Family at Eden Project in Bodelva. Also met with US Air Force personnel at RAF Mildenhall. Stayed at Tregenna Castle. | |
| 1 | Belgium | Brussels | June 13–15 | Attended the 31st NATO summit. Met with King Philippe and Prime Minister Alexander De Croo at the Royal Palace of Brussels. Held multilateral meetings with the leaders of the Baltic states, Secretary General of NATO Jens Stoltenberg, and Turkish president Recep Erdoğan. Also participated in an EU–US summit with European Council president Charles Michel and European Commission president Ursula von der Leyen at the Europa building. Stayed at the US Embassy in Brussels. | |
| 1 | Switzerland | Geneva | June 15–16 | Attended the summit meeting with Russian president Vladimir Putin at Villa La Grange. Held a bilateral meeting with Swiss president Guy Parmelin and Swiss foreign minister Ignazio Cassis at the InterContinental Geneva, where he stayed. | |
| 2 | Vatican City | Vatican City | October 29 | Met with Pope Francis at the Apostolic Palace. Also held bilateral meeting with Cardinal Secretary of State Pietro Parolin. | |
| 2 | Italy | Rome | October 29 – November 1 | Met with Italian president Sergio Mattarella at Quirinale Palace, Italian prime minister Mario Draghi at Chigi Palace, and French president Emmanuel Macron at the Embassy of France. On October 30, attended the G20 summit at La Nuvola in Rome. Met with Italian prime minister Mario Draghi, took the customary photo with other world leaders, and attended an event on supporting women-owned businesses. Met with British prime minister Boris Johnson, French president Emmanuel Macron, and outgoing German Chancellor Angela Merkel. On October 31, Also held bilateral meeting with Turkish president Recep Tayyip Erdoğan. | |
| 2 | United Kingdom | Glasgow | November 1–2 | Attended COP26 at the Scottish Event Campus. Met with British prime minister Boris Johnson, First Minister of Scotland Nicola Sturgeon, and UN Secretary-General António Guterres. Also held a bilateral meeting with Indonesian president Joko Widodo. | |

== 2022 ==
| # | Country | Areas visited | Dates | Details | Image |
|---|---|---|---|---|---|
| 3 | Belgium | Brussels | March 23–25 | Attended and delivered remarks at an extraordinary NATO Summit at NATO Headquarters to discuss the Russian invasion of Ukraine. Also held bilateral meeting with European Council President Charles Michel. On March 25, also held bilateral meeting with European Commission President Ursula von der Leyen. | |
| 3 | Poland | Rzeszów, Warsaw | March 25–26 | State Visit. Met with service members from the 82nd Airborne Division. On March 26, met with President Andrzej Duda at the Presidential Palace. He met refugees at Stadion Narodowy and talked with Prime Minister Mateusz Morawiecki and Mayor of Warsaw Rafał Trzaskowski. Met with Ukrainian Minister of Foreign Affairs Dmytro Kuleba and Minister of Defense Oleksii Reznikov. He delivered a speech on the united efforts of the free world to support the people of Ukraine in the courtyard of Royal Castle. | |
| 3 | United Kingdom | Mildenhall | March 26 | Briefly stopped at RAF Mildenhall to visit troops as Air Force One was being refueled. | |
| 4 | South Korea | Seoul, Pyeongtaek | May 20−22 | Met with President Yoon Suk-yeol. Visited Samsung Electronics Pyeongtaek Campus. | |
| 4 | Japan | Tokyo | May 22–24 | Met with Emperor Naruhito at Tokyo Imperial Palace and Prime Minister Fumio Kishida at Akasaka Palace. Attended the QUAD Leaders Summit, also held bilateral meetings with Indian prime minister Narendra Modi and Australian prime minister Anthony Albanese at Kantei Palace. | |
| 5 | Germany | Krün | June 25–28 | Attended the 48th G7 summit. Met with German chancellor Olaf Scholz, British prime minister Boris Johnson and French president Emmanuel Macron. | |
| 5 | Spain | Madrid | June 28–30 | Met with Prime Minister Pedro Sánchez at the Palace of Moncloa and King Felipe VI at the Royal Palace of Madrid. Attended the 32nd NATO Summit at IFEMA. Held trilateral meeting with Japanese prime minister Fumio Kishida and South Korean president Yoon Suk-yeol. Held a bilateral meeting with Turkish president Recep Tayyip Erdoğan. | |
| 6 | Israel | Jerusalem | July 13–15 | Met with President Isaac Herzog and Prime Minister Yair Lapid, Visited Yad Vashem. Attended the inaugural I2U2 virtual summit at the Waldorf Astoria Jerusalem. | |
| 6 | Palestinian Authority (West Bank) | East Jerusalem, Bethlehem | July 15 | Met with President Mahmoud Abbas. Visited the Augusta Victoria Hospital and Church of the Nativity. | |
| 6 | Saudi Arabia | Jeddah | July 15–16 | Met with King Salman and Crown Prince Mohammed bin Salman at Al Salam Royal Palace. Attended the GCC+3 special summit. Held a bilateral meeting with Egyptian president Abdel Fattah el-Sisi, Iraqi prime minister Mustafa Al-Kadhimi and United Arab Emirates President Mohamed bin Zayed Al Nahyan at The Ritz-Carlton Jeddah. | |
| 6 | United Kingdom | Mildenhall | July 16 | Briefly stopped at RAF Mildenhall to refuel Air Force One. | |
| 7 | United Kingdom | London | September 17–19 | Paid respects at the Queen's lying in state, met with the new King Charles III at a reception at Buckingham Palace and attended the state funeral of Queen Elizabeth II at Westminster Abbey. | |
| 8 | Egypt | Sharm el-Sheikh | November 11 | Attended the COP27 at Tonino Lamborghini International Convention Center. Met with President Abdel Fattah el-Sisi. | |
| 8 | Cambodia | Phnom Penh | November 12–13 | Attended the US–ASEAN Summit and the Seventeenth East Asia Summit at Sokha Hotel. Met with Prime Minister Hun Sen. Held bilateral meetings Japanese prime minister Fumio Kishida and South Korean president Yoon Suk-yeol. | |
| 8 | Indonesia | Nusa Dua | November 13–16 | Attended the G20 summit. Met with President Joko Widodo. Held bilateral meetings with CCP General Secretary Xi Jinping, European Commission President Ursula von der Leyen, Italian prime minister Giorgia Meloni and British prime minister Rishi Sunak. | |

== 2023 ==
| # | Country | Areas visited | Dates | Details | Image |
|---|---|---|---|---|---|
| 9 | Mexico | Mexico City | January 8–10 | Attended the 10th North American Leaders' Summit. Met with Mexican president Andrés Manuel López Obrador and Canadian prime minister Justin Trudeau. | |
| 10 | Ukraine | Kyiv | February 20 | Main article: 2023 visit by Joe Biden to Ukraine Unannounced visit. Met with President Volodymyr Zelenskyy and First Lady Olena Zelenska at the Mariinskyi Palace. Visited the St. Michael's Golden-Domed Monastery with President Zelenskyy. | |
| 10 | Poland | Rzeszów, Przemyśl, Warsaw | February 20–22 | State Visit. Flew to Rzeszow, then transferred to Przemysl and via train went to Kyiv, Ukraine. Met with President Andrzej Duda, Prime Minister Mateusz Morawiecki and Moldovan president Maia Sandu after returning to Poland. Attended the B9. Delivered a speech at the Royal Castle Gardens marking the first anniversary of the Russian invasion of Ukraine. | |
| 11 | Canada | Ottawa | March 23–24 | Met with Governor General Mary Simon and Prime Minister Justin Trudeau. Addressed a joint session of the Canadian Parliament. | |
| 12 | United Kingdom | Belfast | April 11–12 | Attended the 25th anniversary commemoration of the Good Friday Agreement and met with Prime Minister Rishi Sunak. | |
| 12 | Ireland | Dublin, Carlingford, Dundalk, Knock, Ballina | April 12–14 | Met with President Michael D. Higgins and Taoiseach Leo Varadkar. Addressed the Oireachtas. Visited ancestral homes in both County Louth and County Mayo, touring Carlingford Castle and Knock Shrine. Made a public address at St Muredach's Cathedral, Ballina. | |
| 13 | Japan | Hiroshima | May 18–21 | Attended the 49th G7 summit and QUAD Leaders meeting at Grand Prince Hotel Hiroshima. Met with Prime Minister Fumio Kishida, Australian prime minister Anthony Albanese, Indian prime minister Narendra Modi, South Korean president Yoon Suk Yeol and Ukrainian president Volodymyr Zelenskyy. Visited the Hiroshima Peace Memorial Museum and Itsukushima Shrine. | |
| 14 | United Kingdom | London, Windsor | July 9–10 | Met with Prime Minister Rishi Sunak at 10 Downing Street and King Charles III at Windsor Castle. | |
| 14 | Lithuania | Vilnius | July 10–12 | Attended the 33rd NATO summit at LITEXPO. Met with President Gitanas Nausėda, Turkish president Recep Tayyip Erdoğan and Ukrainian president Volodymyr Zelenskyy. | |
| 14 | Finland | Helsinki | July 12–13 | Attended the US–Nordic Leaders' Summit. Met with President Sauli Niinistö and Prime Minister Petteri Orpo. | |
| 15 | India | New Delhi | September 8–10 | Attended the G20 summit at Bharat Mandapam International Exhibition-Convention Centre. Met with Prime Minister Narendra Modi. Visited at Raj Ghat Memorial to pay respect to Mahatma Gandhi. | |
| 15 | Vietnam | Hanoi | September 10–11 | Met with Communist Party General Secretary Nguyễn Phú Trọng, President Võ Văn Thưởng, Prime Minister Phạm Minh Chính and Chairman of the National Assembly Vương Đình Huệ. Signed a strategic partnership agreement. Visited John McCain Memorial. | |
| 16 | Israel | Tel Aviv | October 18 | Met with Prime Minister Benjamin Netanyahu to show US support for Israel in the Gaza war. | |

== 2024 ==
| # | Country | Areas visited | Dates | Details | Image |
|---|---|---|---|---|---|
| 17 | France | Normandy, Paris, Belleau | June 5–9 | State Visit. Met with President Emmanuel Macron at the Élysée Palace. Attended the 80th anniversary of D-Day memorial ceremonies. Visited the Normandy American Cemetery and Memorial, Omaha Beach and the Aisne-Marne American Cemetery. Delivered remarks at Pointe du Hoc. Held a bilateral meeting with Ukrainian president Volodymyr Zelenskyy at the InterContinental Paris Le Grand Hotel. | |
| 18 | Italy | Fasano | June 12–14 | Attended the G7 summit at Borgo Egnazia. Met with Prime Minister Giorgia Meloni, Ukrainian president Volodymyr Zelenskyy and Pope Francis. | |
| 19 | Germany | Berlin | October 17–18 | Met with President Frank-Walter Steinmeier at Bellevue Palace and Chancellor Olaf Scholz at The Chancellery. Participated in a meeting with Chancellor Scholz, French president Emmanuel Macron and British prime minister Keir Starmer. | |
| 20 | Peru | Lima | November 14–17 | Attended the APEC summit at the Lima Convention Center and APEC Leaders' Gala at the Government Palace. Met with President Dina Boluarte, Japanese prime minister Shigeru Ishiba, South Korean president Yoon Suk Yeol and CCP General Secretary Xi Jinping. | |
| 20 | Brazil | Manaus, Rio de Janeiro | November 17–19 | Visited the Amazon rainforest, becoming the first sitting president to do so and visited Museu da Amazônia. Attended at the G20 summit at the Museum of Modern Art. Met with President Luiz Inácio Lula da Silva. | |
| 21 | Cape Verde | Sal | December 2 | Briefly stopped at Amílcar Cabral International Airport, becoming the first sitting US president to visit the country. Met with Prime Minister Ulisses Correia e Silva. | |
| 21 | Angola | Luanda, Lobito | December 2–4 | Met with President João Lourenço at the Presidential Palace of Angola, becoming the first sitting US president to visit the country. Delivered remarks at the National Museum of Slavery. Toured the Lobito Port Terminal. Visited Carrinho Food Processing Factory. Attended the Lobito Corrridor Trans-Africa Summit. | |

== Multilateral meetings ==
Multilateral meetings of the following intergovernmental organizations took place during Joe Biden's presidency (2021–2025).

| Group | Year | | | |
| Group | 2021 | 2022 | 2023 | 2024 |
|---|---|---|---|---|
| APEC | November 12 (videoconference) (New Zealand) Auckland | November 18–19^{[a]} (Thailand) Bangkok | November 15–17 (United States) San Francisco | November 15–16 (Peru) Lima |
| EAS (ASEAN) | October 26–27 (videoconference) (Brunei) Bandar Seri Begawan | November 12–13 (Cambodia) Phnom Penh | September 6–7^{[a]} (Indonesia) Jakarta | October 10–11^{[b]} (Laos) Vientiane |
| G7 | June 11–13 (United Kingdom) Carbis Bay | June 26–28 (Germany) Krün | May 19–21 (Japan) Hiroshima | June 13–15 (Italy) Fasano |
| G20 | October 30–31 (Italy) Rome | November 15–16 (Indonesia) Nusa Dua | September 9–10 (India) New Delhi | November 18–19 (Brazil) Rio de Janeiro |
| NATO | June 14 (Belgium) Brussels | March 24 (Belgium) Brussels | July 11–12 (Lithuania) Vilnius | July 9–11 (United States) Washington |
| NATO | June 14 (Belgium) Brussels | June 28–30 (Spain) Madrid | July 11–12 (Lithuania) Vilnius | July 9–11 (United States) Washington |
| SOA (OAS) | none | June 8–10 (United States) Los Angeles | none | none |
| NALS | November 18 (United States) Washington | none | January 10; Mexico City | none |
| UNCCC | November 1–2 (United Kingdom) Glasgow | November 11 (Egypt) Sharm el-Sheikh | November 30 – December 3^{[a]} (United Arab Emirates) Dubai | November 12^{[c]} (Azerbaijan) Baku |
| QUAD | September 24 (United States) Washington | May 24 (Japan) Tokyo | May 20 (Japan) Hiroshima | September 21 (United States) Wilmington |
| Others | none | U.S.–ASEAN Summit; May 12–13 (United States) Washington | Bucharest Nine; February 22 (Poland) Warsaw | United States–Japan–Philippines Summit; April 10–13; Washington D.C. |
| Others | none | I2U2; July 14 (Israel) Jerusalem | AUKUS; March 13 (United States) San Diego | Global Peace Summit; June 15–16^{[a]} (Switzerland) Lucerne |
| Others | none | U.S.–Oceania Summit; September 28–29 (United States) Washington | JAROKUS; August 18 (United States) Camp David | Global Peace Summit; June 15–16^{[a]} (Switzerland) Lucerne |
| Others | none | U.S.–Africa Summit; December 13–15 (United States) Washington | JAROKUS; August 18 (United States) Camp David | Global Peace Summit; June 15–16^{[a]} (Switzerland) Lucerne |
██ = Did not attend / participate. ██ = Virtual event^aVice President Kamala Harris attended the summit in the president's place.^bSecretary of States Antony Blinken attended the summit in the president's place.^cJohn Podesta attended the summit the president's place.

== See also ==
- Foreign policy of the Biden administration
- Foreign policy of the United States
- List of international trips made by Antony Blinken as United States Secretary of State
