= List of United States presidential visits to Southern Europe =

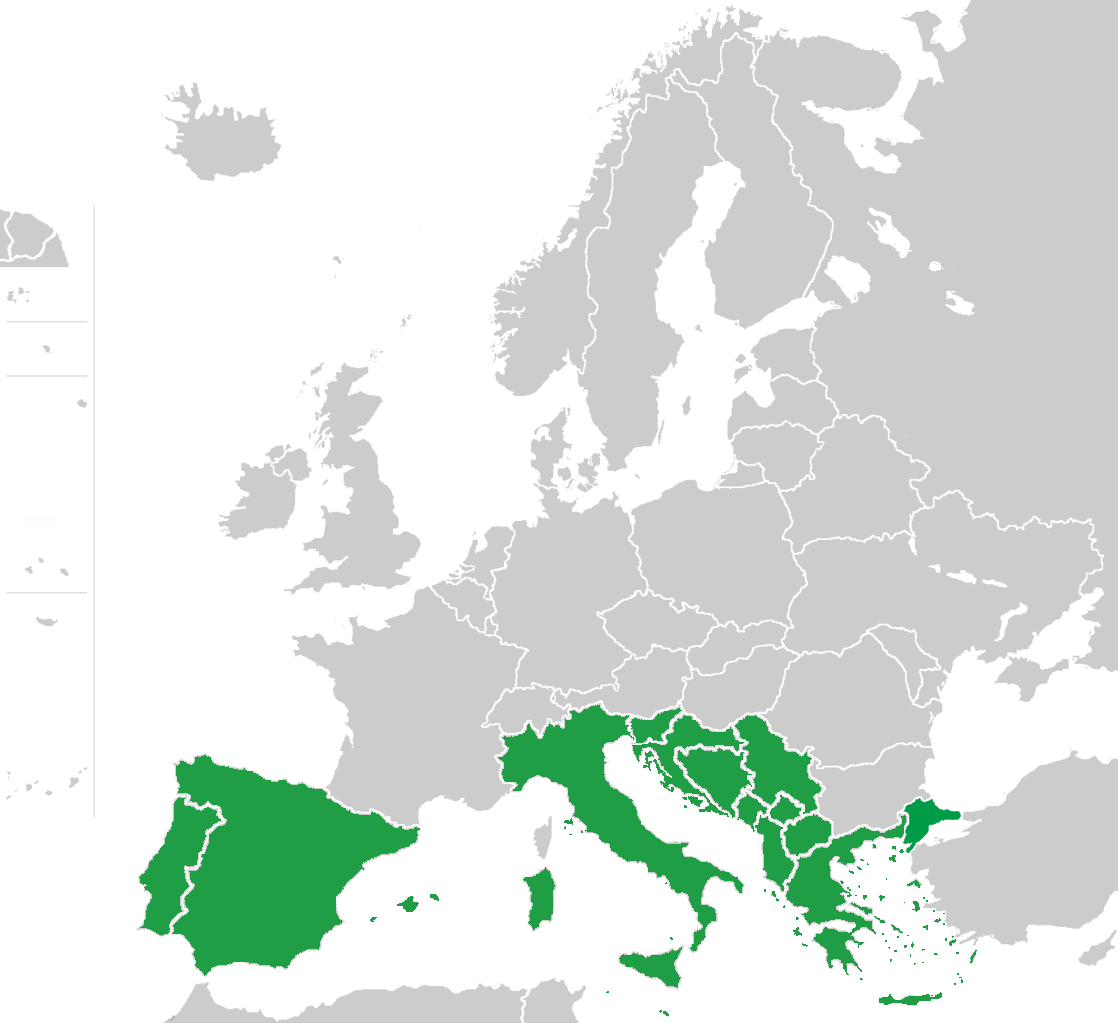
Map of Europe featuring the countries of Southern Europe (highlighted in dark green)

Thirteen United States presidents have made presidential visits to Southern Europe. Woodrow Wilson became the first incumbent president to visit a Southern European country in January 1919 in the aftermath of World War I. Visits occurring during the 1940s through 1980s were offshoots of American diplomatic interactions during World War II and then the Cold War.

To date, 34 visits have been made to Italy, 23 to Vatican City, 11 to Spain, eight to Portugal, four to Greece, three to Bosnia and Herzegovina, three to Malta, three to Slovenia, two to Croatia, two to Kosovo, one to Albania, and one to Macedonia (now known as North Macedonia). Three were also made to Yugoslavia prior to its breakup during the early 1990s. Of the present-day nations in (or partly within) the region, all but Cyprus, San Marino, Andorra, Montenegro, and Serbia have been visited by a sitting American president.

== Table of visits ==
President	Dates	Country or territory	Locations	Key details
Woodrow Wilson	January 1–6, 1919	Italy	Rome, Genoa, Milan, Turin	Met with King Victor Emmanuel III and Prime Minister Vittorio Orlando.
Woodrow Wilson	January 4, 1919	Vatican	Apostolic Palace	Audience with Pope Benedict XV.
Franklin D. Roosevelt	December 8, 1943	Italy	Castelvetrano	Visited Allied military installations.
Franklin D. Roosevelt	December 8, 1943	Malta	Valletta	Visited Allied military installations
Franklin D. Roosevelt	February 2, 1945	Malta	Floriana	Attended Malta Conference with Prime Minister Winston Churchill.
Dwight D. Eisenhower	December 4–6, 1959	Italy	Rome	Informal Visit. Met with President Giovanni Gronchi.
Dwight D. Eisenhower	December 6, 1959	Vatican City	Apostolic Palace	Audience with Pope John XXIII.
Dwight D. Eisenhower	December 14–15, 1959	Greece	Athens	Official Visit. Met with King Paul and Prime Minister Konstantinos Karamanlis. Addressed the Greek Parliament.
Dwight D. Eisenhower	December 21–22, 1959	Spain	Madrid	Met with Generalísimo Francisco Franco.
Dwight D. Eisenhower	May 19–20, 1960	Portugal	Lisbon	Official Visit. Met with President Américo Tomás
John F. Kennedy	July 1–2, 1963	Italy	Rome, Naples	Met with President Antonio Segni, Italian and NATO officials.
John F. Kennedy	July 2, 1963	Vatican City	Apostolic Palace	Audience with Pope Paul VI.
Lyndon B. Johnson	December 23, 1967	Italy	Rome	Met with President Giuseppe Saragat and Prime Minister Aldo Moro.
Lyndon B. Johnson	December 23, 1967	Vatican City	Apostolic Palace	Audience with Pope Paul VI.
Richard Nixon	February 27–28, 1969	Italy	Rome	Met with President Giuseppe Saragat and Prime Minister Mariano Rumor and other officials.
Richard Nixon	March 2, 1969	Vatican City	Apostolic Palace	Audience with Pope Paul VI.
Richard Nixon	September 27–30, 1970	Italy	Rome, Naples	Official Visit. Met with President Giuseppe Saragat. Visited NATO Southern Command.
Richard Nixon	September 28, 1970	Vatican City	Apostolic Palace	Audience with Pope Paul VI.
Richard Nixon	September 30 – October 2, 1970	Yugoslavia	Belgrade, Zagreb	State Visit. Met with President Josip Broz Tito.
Richard Nixon	October 2–3, 1970	Spain	Madrid	State Visit. Met with Generalissimo Francisco Franco.
Richard Nixon	December 13–14, 1971	Portugal	Terceira Island	Discussed international monetary problems with French president Georges Pompidou and Portuguese prime minister Marcelo Caetano.
Richard Nixon	June 18–19, 1974	Portugal	Lajes Field	Met with President António de Spínola.
Gerald Ford	May 31 – June 1, 1975	Spain	Madrid	Met with Generalissimo Francisco Franco. Received keys to city from Mayor of Madrid, Miguel Angel García-Lomas Mata.
Gerald Ford	June 3, 1975	Italy	Rome	Met with President Giovanni Leone and Prime Minister Aldo Moro.
Gerald Ford	June 3, 1975	Vatican City	Apostolic Palace	Audience with Pope Paul VI.
Gerald Ford	August 3–4, 1975	Yugoslavia	Belgrade	Official Visit. Met with President Josip Broz Tito and Prime Minister Džemal Bijedić.
Jimmy Carter	June 19–24, 1980	Italy	Rome, Venice	Attended the 6th G7 summit. State Visit. Met with President Sandro Pertini.
Jimmy Carter	June 21, 1980	Vatican City	Apostolic Palace	Audience with Pope John Paul II.
Jimmy Carter	June 24–25, 1980	Yugoslavia	Belgrade	Official Visit. Met with President Cvijetin Mijatović.
Jimmy Carter	June 25–26, 1980	Spain	Madrid	Official Visit. Met with King Juan Carlos I and Prime Minister Adolfo Suárez.
Jimmy Carter	June 26–30, 1980	Portugal	Lisbon	Official Visit. Met with President António Ramalho Eanes and Prime Minister Francisco de Sá Carneiro.
Ronald Reagan	June 7, 1982	Italy	Rome	State Visit. Met with President Sandro Pertini and Premier Giovanni Spadolini.
Ronald Reagan	June 7, 1982	Vatican City	Apostolic Palace	Audience with Pope John Paul II.
Ronald Reagan	May 6–8, 1985	Spain	Madrid	State Visit. Met with King Juan Carlos I and Prime Minister Felipe González.
Ronald Reagan	May 8–10, 1985	Portugal	Lisbon	State Visit. Met with President António Ramalho Eanes and Prime Minister Mário Soares. Addressed the National Assembly.
Ronald Reagan	June 3–11, 1987	Italy	Venice, Rome	Attended the 13th G7 summit. Met with President Francesco Cossiga and Prime Minister Amintore Fanfani.
Ronald Reagan	June 6, 1987	Vatican City	Apostolic Palace	Audience with Pope John Paul II.
George H. W. Bush	May 26–28, 1989	Italy	Rome, Nettuno	Met with President Francesco Cossiga and Prime Minister Ciriaco De Mita.
George H. W. Bush	May 27, 1989	Vatican City	Apostolic Palice	Audience with Pope John Paul II.
George H. W. Bush	December 1–3, 1989	Malta	Valletta, Marsaxlokk	Attended the Summit Meeting with Soviet General Secretary Mikhail Gorbachev. Also met with Maltese Prime Minister Eddie Fenech Adami.
George H. W. Bush	July 18–20, 1991	Greece	Athens, Souda Bay	Met with Prime Minister Konstantinos Mitsotakis. Addressed U.S. and Greek military personnel.
George H. W. Bush	October 29–30, 1991	Spain	Madrid	Met with Prime Minister Felipe Gonzalez Marquez and Soviet President Mikhail Gorbachev. Attended the opening session of the Middle East Peace Conference.
George H. W. Bush	November 6–8, 1991	Italy	Rome	Attended the NATO Summit Meeting.
George H. W. Bush	November 8, 1991	Vatican City	Apostolic Palace	Audience with Pope John Paul II.
Bill Clinton	June 2–4, 1994	Italy	Rome, Nettuno	Met with Prime Minister Silvio Berlusconi and President Oscar Luigi Scalfaro. Visited U.S. Military Cemetery.
Bill Clinton	June 2, 1994	Vatican City	apostolic Palace	Audience with Pope John Paul II.
Bill Clinton	July 7–10, 1994	Italy	Naples	Attended the 20th G7 summit. Met with Italian prime minister Silvio Berlusconi, Japanese prime minister Tomiichi Murayama, Canadian prime minister Jean Chrétien and Russian president Boris Yeltsin.
Bill Clinton	December 2–3, 1995	Spain	Madrid	Attended the European Union Summit Meeting.
Bill Clinton	January 13, 1996	Bosnia and Herzegovina	Tuzla	Met with President Alija Izetbegović. Addressed U.S. military personnel.
Bill Clinton	January 13, 1996	Croatia	Zagreb	Met with President Franjo Tudjman.
Bill Clinton	January 13, 1996	Italy	Aviano Air Base	Met with U.S. military personnel.
Bill Clinton	July 4–10, 1997	Spain	Palma de Mallorca, Madrid, Granada	Vacationed with King Juan Carlos I and Queen Sophia. Attended the 15th NATO Summit Meeting.
Bill Clinton	December 22, 1997	Italy	Aviano Air Base	Stopped en route to and from Bosnia-Herzegovina.
Bill Clinton	December 22, 1997	Bosnia and Herzegovina	Sarajevo, Tuzla	Met with the Bosnian Collective Presidency and Bosnian Serb President Biljana Plavšić. Visited U.S. military personnel.
Bill Clinton	November 20–21, 1999	Italy	Florence	Attended conference on Progressive Governance for the 21st Century.
Bill Clinton	June 21–22, 1999	Slovenia	Ljubljana	Met with President Milan Kučan, Prime Minister Janez Drnovšek and Montenegrin President Milo Đukanović.
Bill Clinton	June 22, 1999	Macedonia	Skopje	Met with President Kiro Gligorov. Addressed Kosovar refugees and NATO military personnel.
Bill Clinton	June 22, 1999	Italy	Aviano Air Base	Addressed U.S. military personnel.
Bill Clinton	July 29–30, 1999	Italy	Aviano Air Base	Stopped en route to Sarajevo.
Bill Clinton	March 18, 2000	Italy	Aviano Air Base	Stopped en route to India.
Bill Clinton	July 30, 1999	Bosnia and Herzegovina	Sarajevo	Attended Stability Pact Leaders Conference.
Bill Clinton	November 19–20, 1999	Greece	Athens	State Visit. Met with Prime Minister Konstantinos Simitis.
Bill Clinton	November 23, 1999	Kosovo	Pristina, Uroševac, Camp Bondsteel	Met with Kosovar Transitional Council. Addressed the Albanian community and U.S. military personnel.
Bill Clinton	May 30 – June 1, 2000	Portugal	Lisbon	Attended the U.S.-EU Summit Meeting. Met with Israeli prime minister Ehud Barak.
George W. Bush	June 12–13, 2001	Spain	Madrid	Met with King Juan Carlos I and Prime Minister José María Aznar.
George W. Bush	June 16, 2001	Slovenia	Kranj	Attended the summit meeting with Russian president Vladimir Putin. Also met with Prime Minister Janez Drnovšek.
George W. Bush	July 20–24, 2001	Italy	Genoa, Castel Gandolfo, Rome	Attended the 27th G8 summit. Met with Pope John Paul II. Also met with Prime Minister Silvio Berlusconi and President Carlo Azeglio Ciampi.
George W. Bush	July 24, 2001	Kosovo	Camp Bondsteel	Addressed U.S. military personnel.
George W. Bush	May 28, 2002	Vatican City	Apostolic Palace	Audience with Pope John Paul II.
George W. Bush	May 27–28, 2002	Italy	Rome	Met with President Carlo Azeglio Ciampi and Prime Minister Silvio Berlusconi. Attended the NATO Summit Meeting and inaugurated the NATO-Russia Council.
George W. Bush	March 16, 2003	Portugal	Terceira Island	Discussed the Iraq crisis with British prime minister Tony Blair, Spanish prime minister José María Aznar and Portuguese prime minister José Manuel Barroso.
George W. Bush	June 4–5, 2004	Italy	Rome	Met with President Carlo Azeglio Ciampi and Prime Minister Silvio Berlusconi.
George W. Bush	June 4, 2004	Vatican City	Apostolic Palace	Met with Pope John Paul II.
George W. Bush	April 6–8, 2005	Vatican City	St. Peter's Basilica	Attended the funeral of Pope John Paul II.
George W. Bush	April 6–8, 2005	Italy	Rome	Met with President Carlo Azeglio Ciampi and Prime Minister Silvio Berlusconi.
George W. Bush	June 8–10, 2007	Italy	Rome	Met with President Giorgio Napolitano and Prime Minister Romano Prodi.
George W. Bush	June 9, 2007	Vatican City	Apostolic Palace	Audience with Pope Benedict XVI.
George W. Bush	June 10, 2007	Albania	Tirana	Met with President Alfred Moisiu and Prime Minister Sali Berisha.
George W. Bush	April 4–5, 2008	Croatia	Zagreb	Met with President Stjepan Mesić.
George W. Bush	June 9–10, 2008	Slovenia	Ljubljana	Met with President Danilo Türk and Prime Minister Janez Janša. Attended the EU-US Summit Meeting.
George W. Bush	June 11–13, 2008	Italy	Rome	Met with President Giorgio Napolitano and Prime Minister Silvio Berlusconi.
George W. Bush	June 13, 2008	Vatican City	Apostolic Palace	Met with Pope Benedict XVI.
Barack Obama	July 8–10, 2009	Italy	L'Aquila, Rome	Attended the 35th G8 summit. Also met with the leaders of Angola, Algeria, Australia, Brazil, China, Egypt, India, Mexico, Nigeria, Senegal, South Africa, and various international organizations.
Barack Obama	July 10, 2009	Vatican City	Apostolic Palace	Audience with Pope Benedict XVI.
Barack Obama	November 19–20, 2010	Portugal	Lisbon	Attended the NATO Summit Meeting and the U.S.-EU Summit Meeting. Met with President Aníbal Cavaco Silva and Prime Minister José Sócrates.
Barack Obama	March 27, 2014	Vatican City	Apostolic Palace	Audience with Pope Francis.
Barack Obama	March 27, 2014	Italy	Rome	Met with President Giorgio Napolitano and Prime Minister Matteo Renzi. Visited the Roman Colosseum.
Barack Obama	July 9–10, 2016	Spain	Madrid, Rota	Met with King Felipe VI and Prime Minister Mariano Rajoy. Also met with American military personnel stationed at Naval Station Rota.
Barack Obama	November 15–16, 2016	Greece	Athens	State Visit. Met with Prime Minister Alexis Tsipras and President Prokopis Pavlopoulos. Toured Acropolis and Acropolis Museum.
Donald Trump	May 23–24, 2017	Italy	Rome	Met with President Sergio Mattarella and Prime Minister Paolo Gentiloni.
Donald Trump	May 24, 2017	Vatican City	Apostolic Palace	Audience with Pope Francis.
Donald Trump	May 25–27, 2017	Italy	Taormina	Attended the 43rd G7 summit.
Joe Biden	October 29, 2021	Vatican City	Apostolic Palace	Audience with Pope Francis.
Joe Biden	October 29 – November 1, 2021	Italy	Rome	Met with President Sergio Mattarella and Prime Minister Mario Draghi. Attended the G20 summit.
Joe Biden	June 28–30, 2022	Spain	Madrid	Attended the NATO Summit Meeting
Joe Biden	June 13–15, 2024	Italy	Borgo Egnazia	Attended the 50th G7 summit.
Donald Trump	April 25, 2025	Italy	Rome	Travelled for the funeral of Pope Francis, spent the night at Villa Taverna, the residence of the U.S. ambassador to Italy.
Donald Trump	April 26, 2025	Vatican City	Apostolic Palace	Attended the funeral of Pope Francis at St. Peter's Square.

=== Visits of former presidents ===
Martin Van Buren and Millard Fillmore each met (separately) with Pope Pius IX in Rome in 1855, as did Franklin Pierce in November 1857. Ulysses S. Grant met with Pope Leo XIII in the Vatican in 1878, during a world tour after leaving the presidency.

Theodore Roosevelt sought an audience with Pope Pius X in April 1910 while in Rome. The Pope agreed to see him, provided Roosevelt would not call on some Methodist missionaries in Rome. Roosevelt had no intention of meeting the missionaries, but he declined to submit to the pope's conditions and the interview did not take place.

Former presidents George H. W. Bush and Bill Clinton accompanied President George W. Bush to the funeral of Pope John Paul II in April 2005.

Former president Joe Biden attended the funeral of Pope Francis in April 2025.

== See also ==
- Foreign policy of the United States
- Stability Pact for South Eastern Europe
- Catholic Church and politics in the United States
- List of meetings between the pope and the president of the United States
