= Borgo Egnazia =

Hotel in Savelletri di Fasano, Italy

Coordinates: 40.8752°N 17.3974°E

Borgo Egnazia is a luxury resort and spa in Savelletri of Fasano, Italy. It is owned by Aldo Melpignano, a former investment analyst. The resort has 45 acres of land which includes the San Domenico golf course and Vair spa, as well as a 28 villas and 63 hotel rooms. The buildings are made of local calcar limestone and designed in the Apulian region's typical historical style. The resort took six years and a €150m investment to build. The name comes from the nearby archeological site of Gnatia.

== Borgo Egnazia in the news ==
Singer Justin Timberlake and actress Jessica Biel married at Borgo Egnazia in October 2012. The ceremony cost $6.5 million as the newlyweds rented the entire resort and flew all guests to the Italian location. Also were wedded in the same location, Nikesh Arora and Ayesha Thapar, in a ceremony that lasted from 3 July to 9 July 2014.

The 50th G7 summit was held at Borgo Egnazia in June 2024.
