= 50th G7 summit =

2024 international leader meeting in Italy

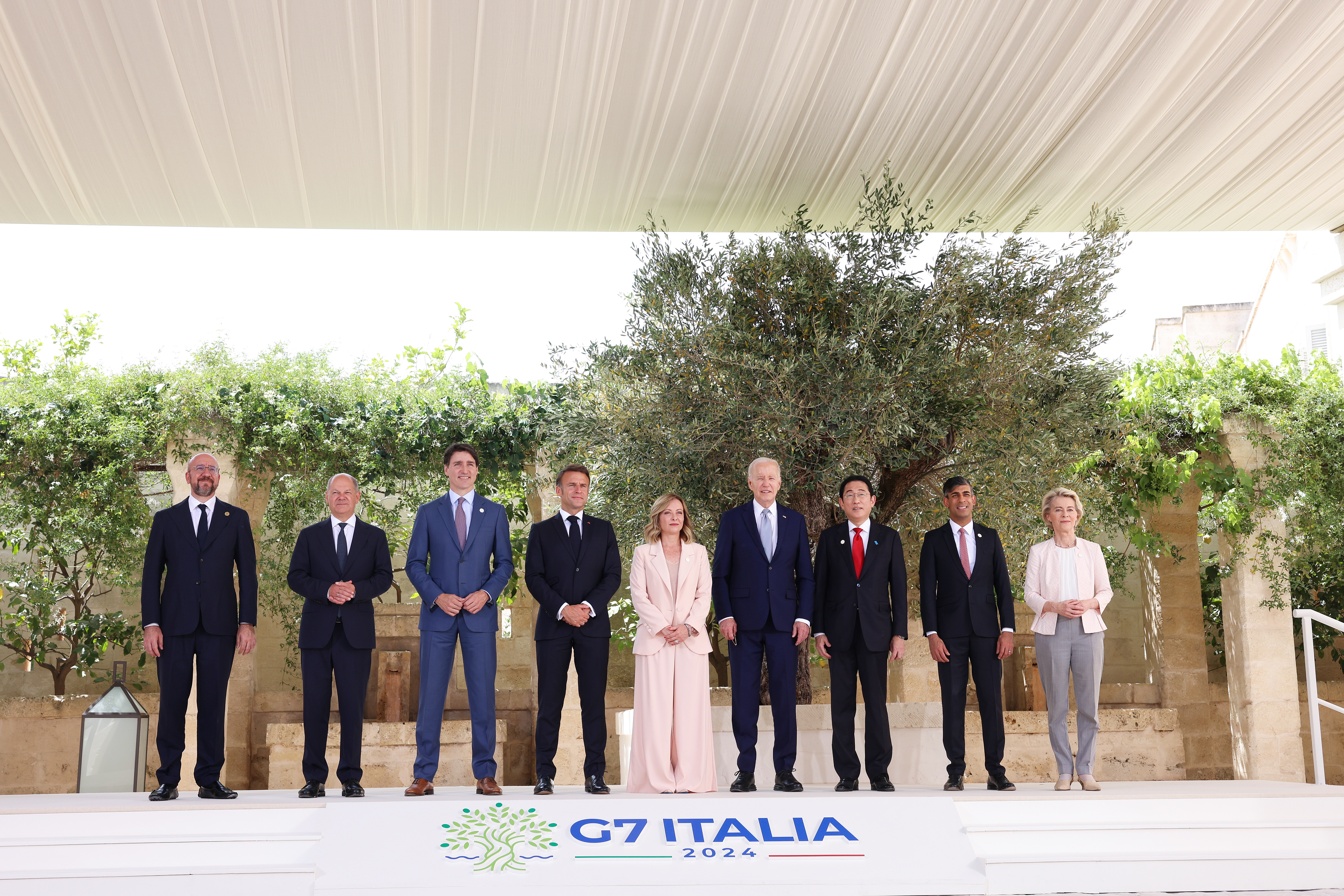
- Host country: Italy
- Date: 13–15 June 2024
- Cities: Fasano
- Venues: Borgo Egnazia
- Participants: Canada; France; Germany; Italy; Japan; United Kingdom; United States; European Union; Invited countries: Algeria; Argentina; Brazil; India; Jordan; Kenya; Mauritania; Tunisia; Turkey; United Arab Emirates; Ukraine; Vatican City
- Follows: 49th G7 summit
- Precedes: 51st G7 summit
- Website: https://www.g7italy.it/en/

The 50th G7 summit was held from 13 to 15 June 2024 in the city of Fasano in Apulia, Italy.

Prime Minister Giorgia Meloni announced in November 2023 that Fasano would be the headquarters of the G7.

== Leaders at the summit ==
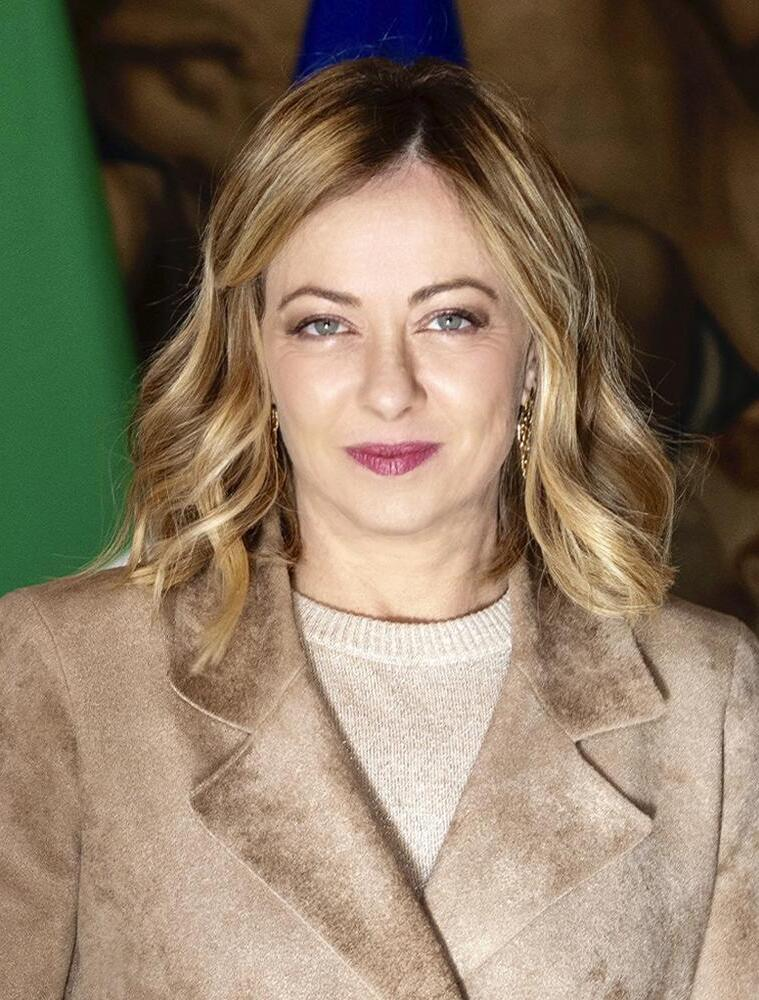
Giorgia Meloni chaired the 50th G7 summit.

=== Background ===
All G7 member states participated in the summit, including the representatives of the European Union. The president of the European Commission has been a permanently welcome participant at all meetings since 1981.

Italy, coinciding with its G7 presidency in 2024, emphasized strategic partnerships with Africa.

This was the first time that a pope has attended a G7 summit.

The 2024 summit was the final summit for European Council President Charles Michel, British Prime Minister Rishi Sunak, Canadian Prime Minister Justin Trudeau, German Chancellor Olaf Scholz, Japanese Prime Minister Fumio Kishida, and U.S. President Joe Biden.

=== Participants and representatives ===
Core G7 Members The host state and leader are shown in bold text.
Member	Represented by	Title
Canada	Justin Trudeau	Prime Minister
France	Emmanuel Macron	President
Germany	Olaf Scholz	Chancellor
**Italy (Host)**	**Giorgia Meloni**	**Prime Minister**
Japan	Fumio Kishida	Prime Minister
United Kingdom	Rishi Sunak	Prime Minister
United States	Joe Biden	President
European Union	Ursula von der Leyen	Commission President
European Union	Charles Michel	Council President
**Invitees**
Countries	Represented by	Title
Algeria	Abdelmadjid Tebboune	President
Argentina	Javier Milei	President
Brazil	Luiz Inácio Lula da Silva	President
India	Narendra Modi	Prime Minister
Jordan	Abdullah II	King
Kenya	William Ruto	President
Mauritania; African Union	Mohamed Ould Ghazouani	Chairperson
Tunisia	Kais Saied	President
Turkey	Recep Tayyip Erdoğan	President
United Arab Emirates	Mohamed bin Zayed Al Nahyan	President
Ukraine	Volodymyr Zelenskyy	President
Vatican City	Pope Francis	Pope

== Gallery of participating leaders ==
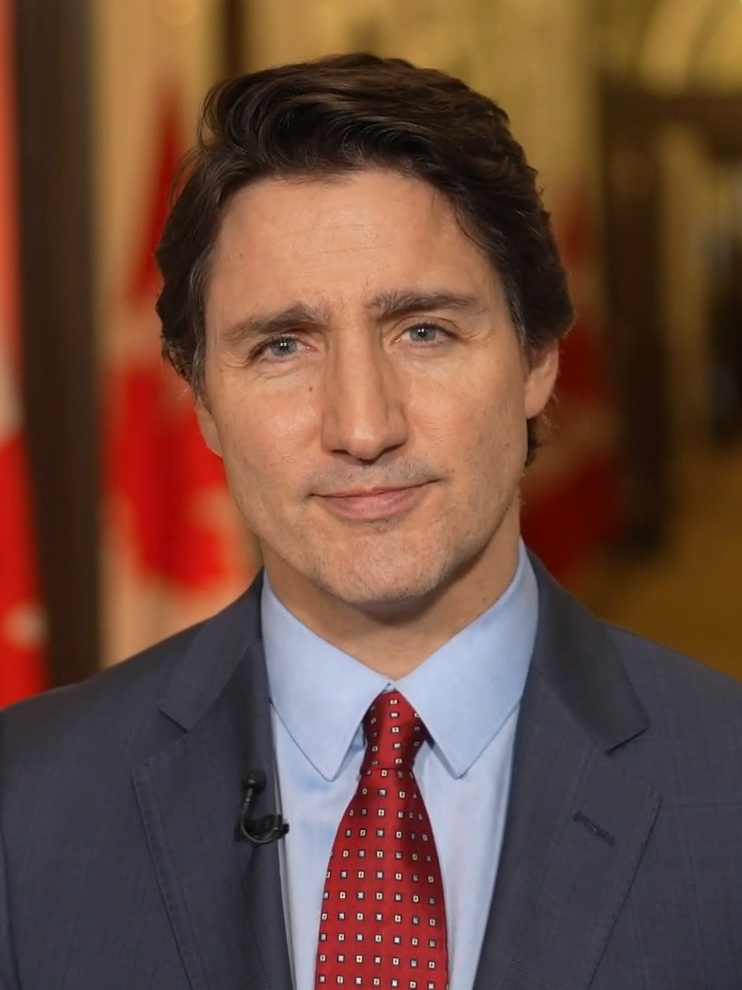
Canada
Justin Trudeau,
Prime Minister

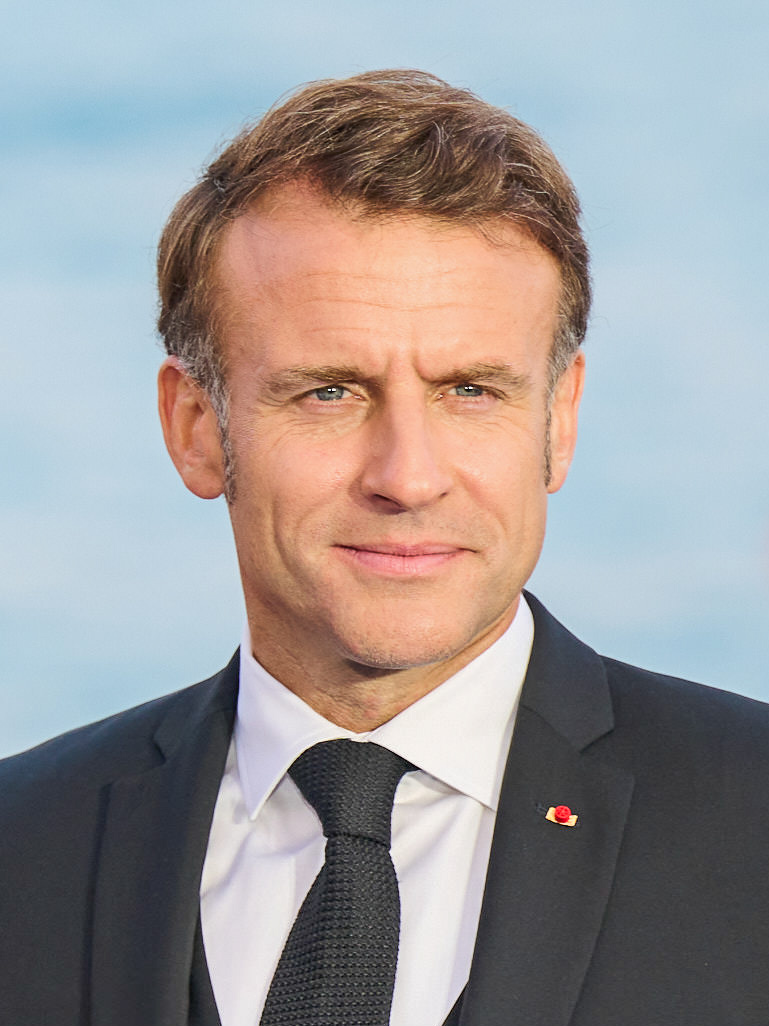
France
Emmanuel Macron,
President

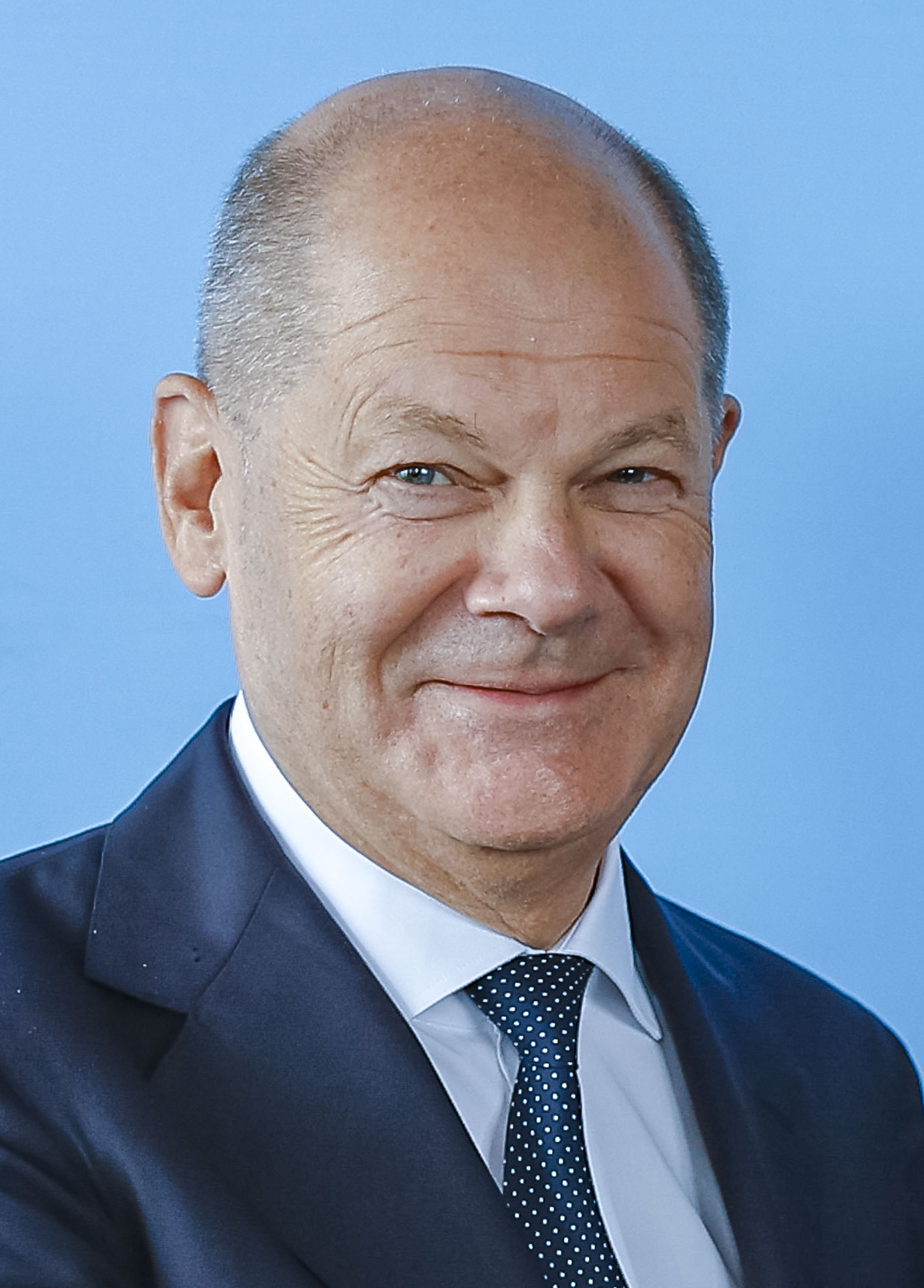
Germany
Olaf Scholz,
Chancellor

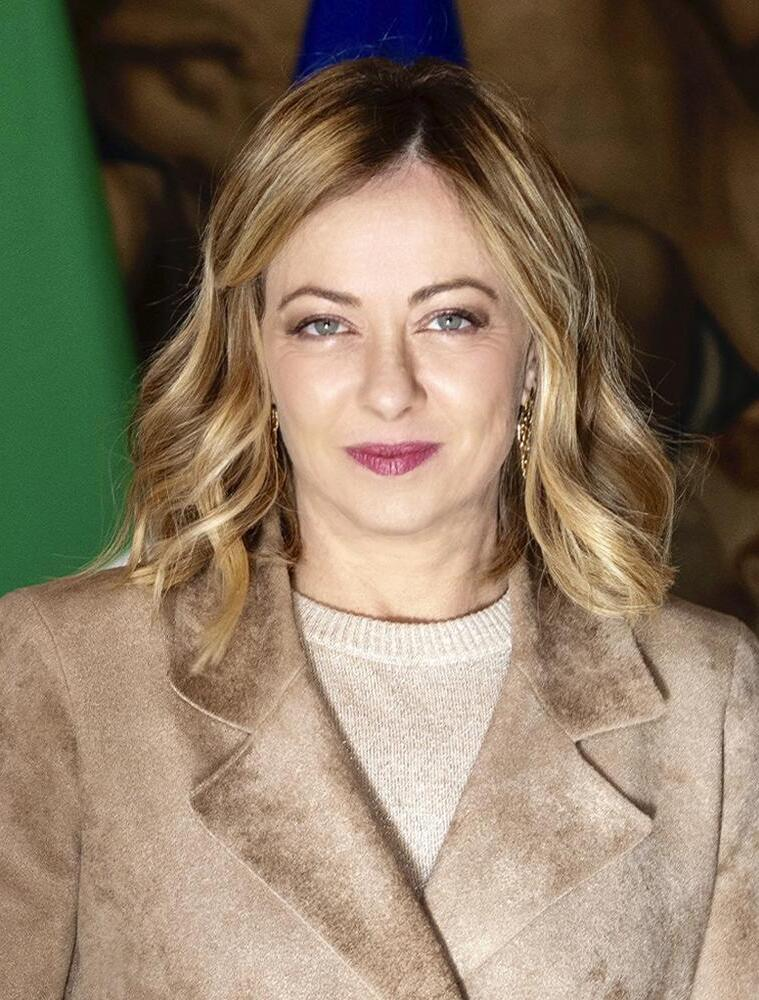
Italy
Giorgia Meloni,
Prime Minister (Host)

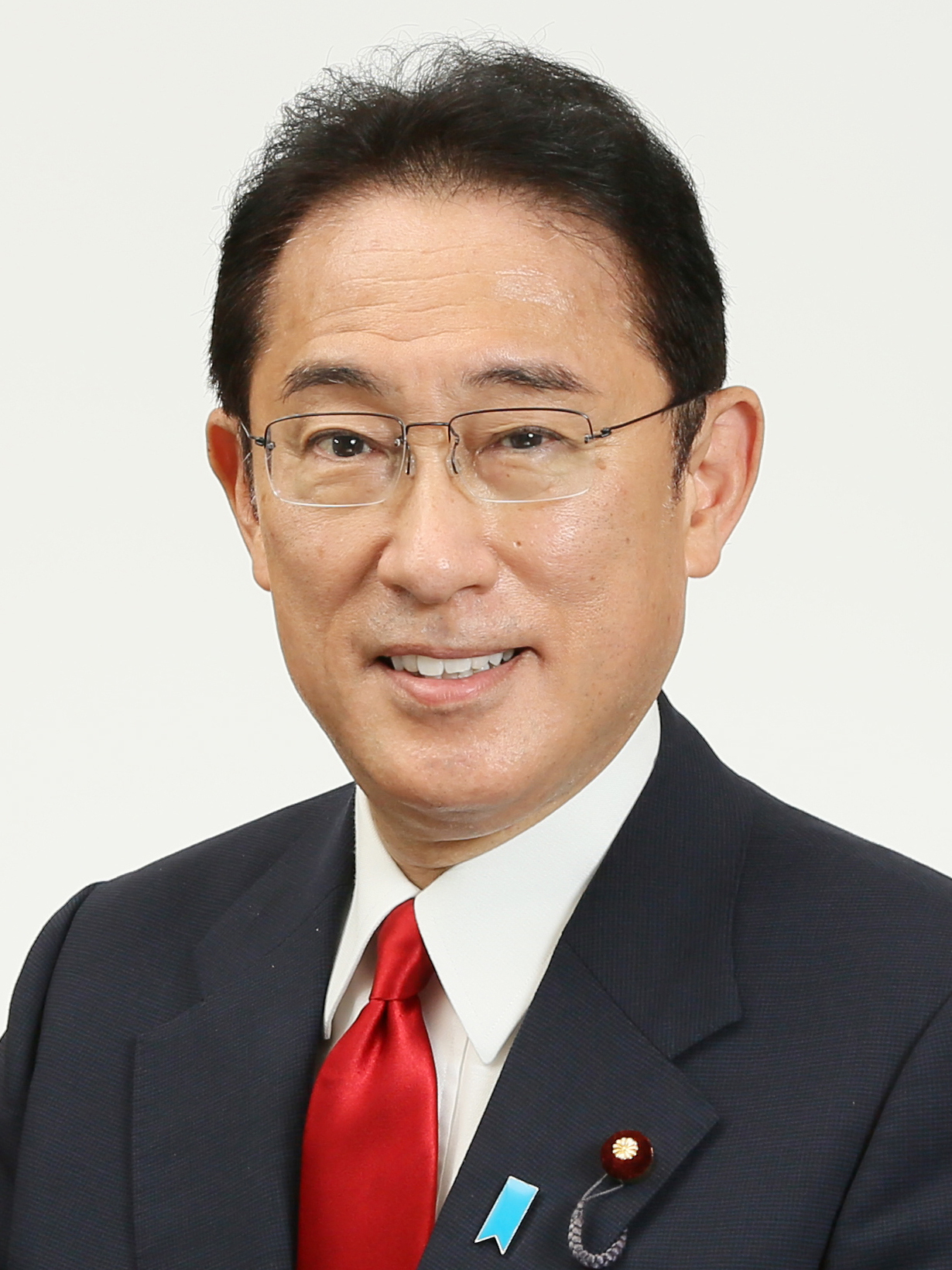
Japan
Fumio Kishida,
Prime Minister

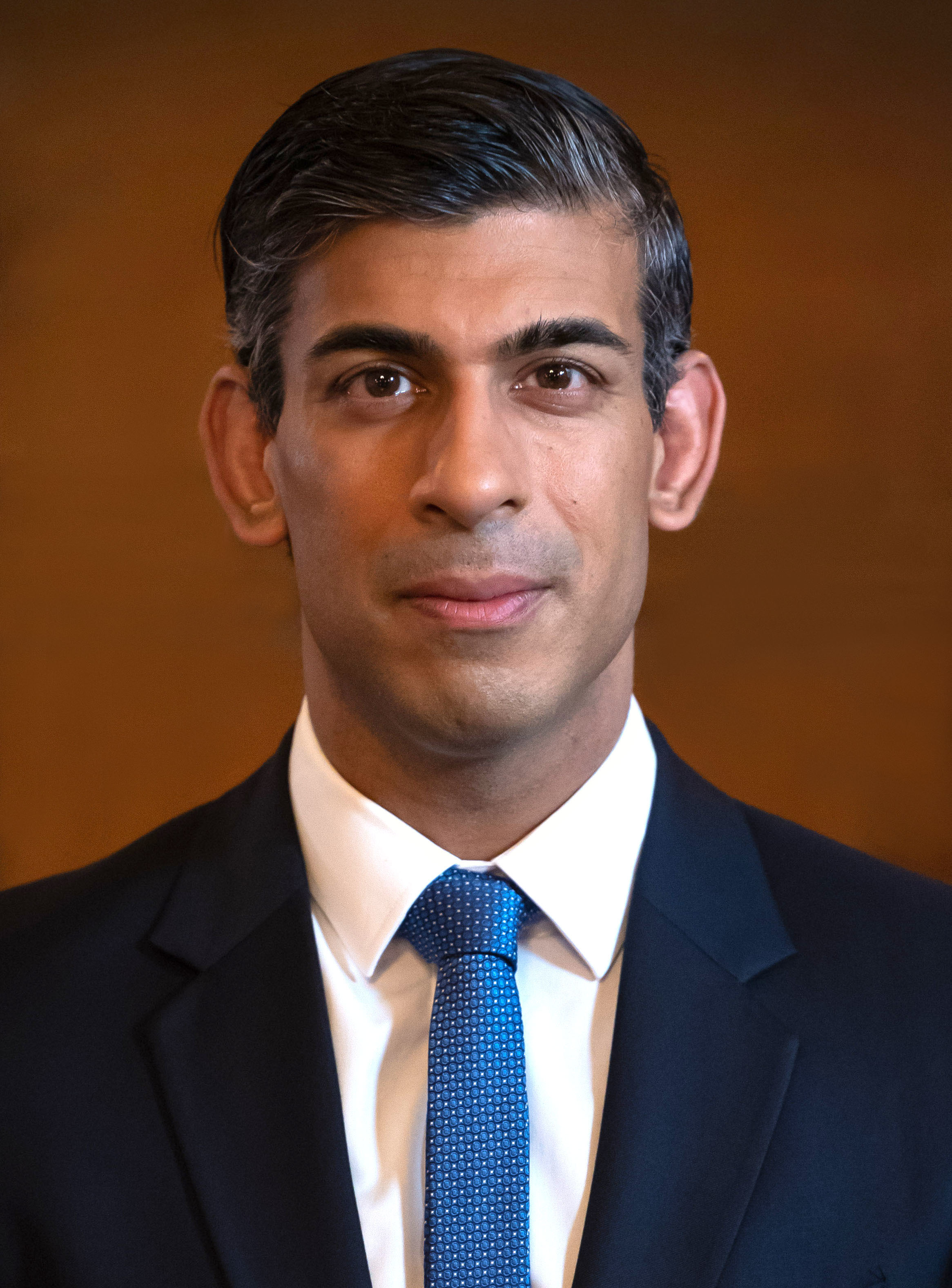
United Kingdom
Rishi Sunak,
Prime Minister

United States
Joe Biden,
President
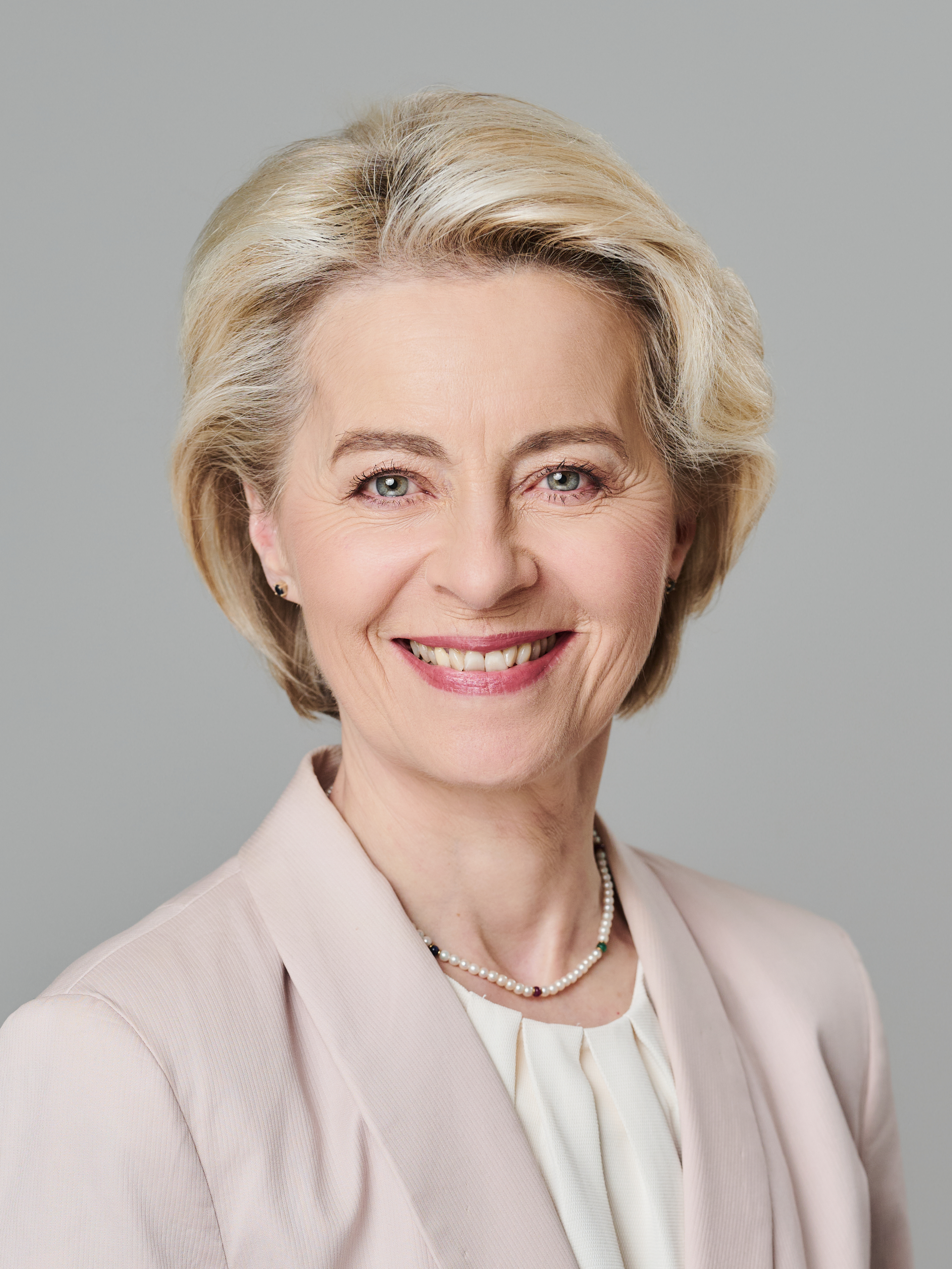
European Union
Ursula von der Leyen, President of the European Commission

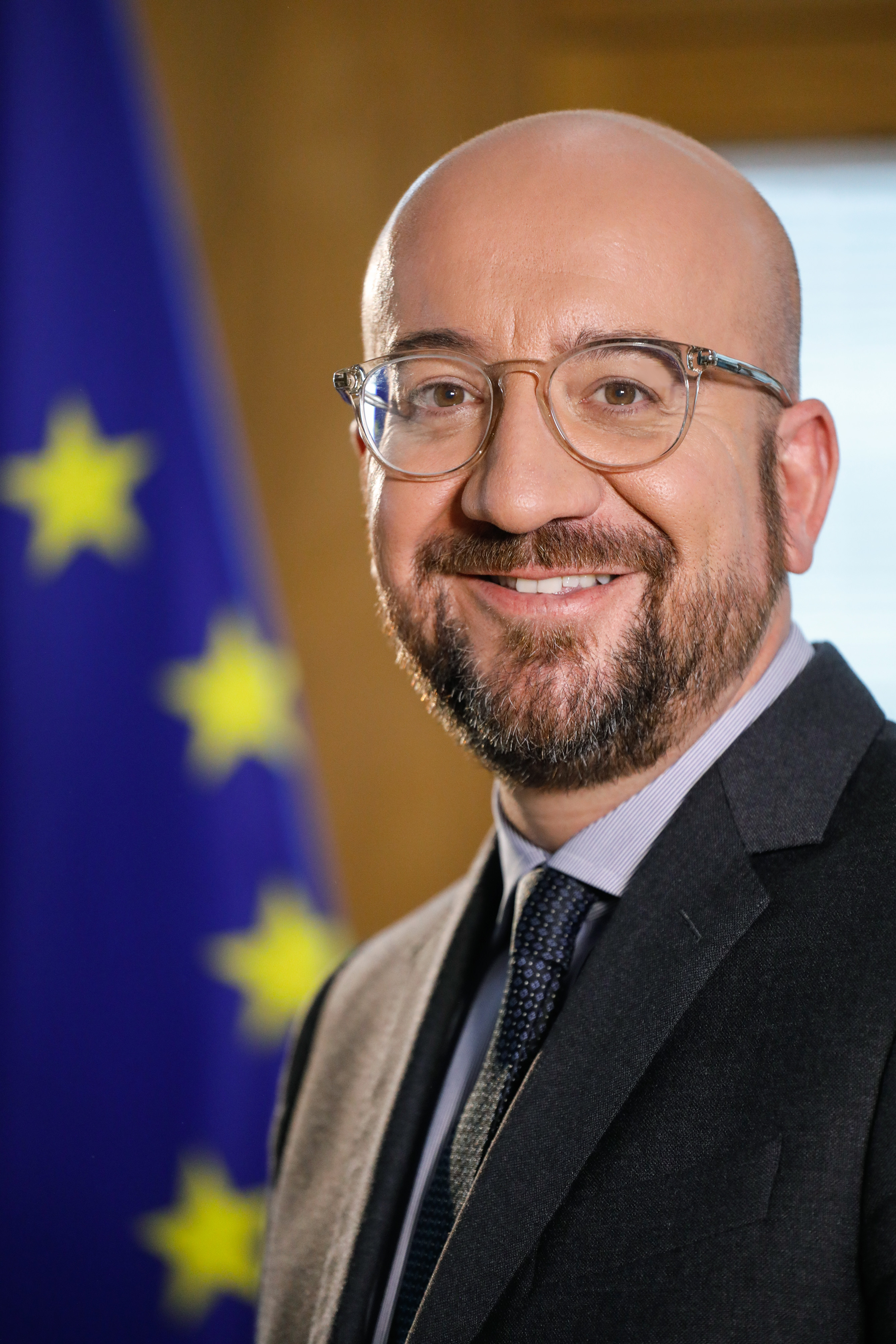
European Union
Charles Michel,
President of the European Council

== Invited leaders ==
Representatives from Algeria, Argentina, Brazil, India, Jordan, Kenya, Mauritania (representing the African Union), Tunisia, Turkey, Ukraine, the United Arab Emirates and the Vatican City were invited to the summit.

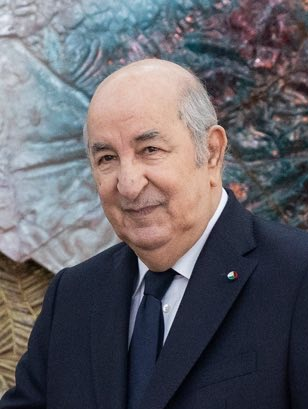
Algeria
Abdelmadjid Tebboune, President

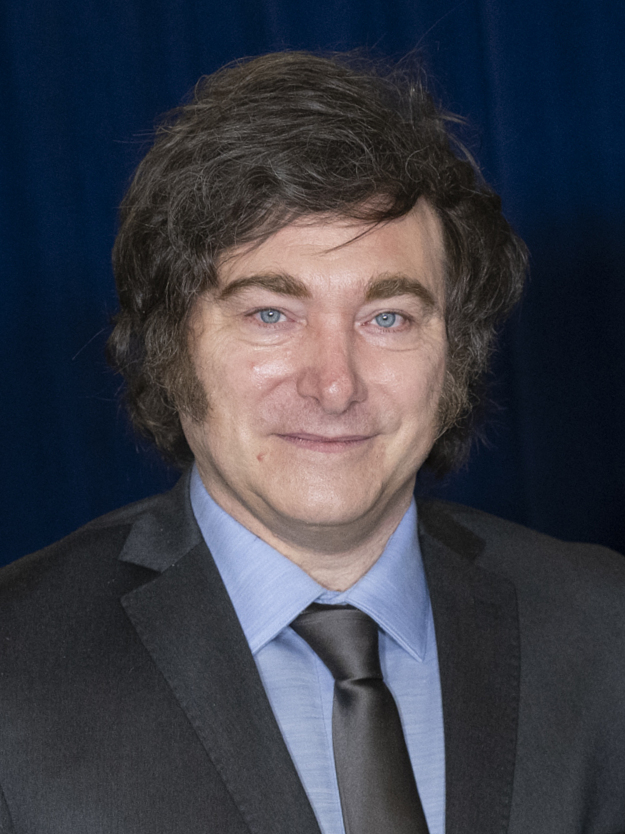
Argentina
Javier Milei, President

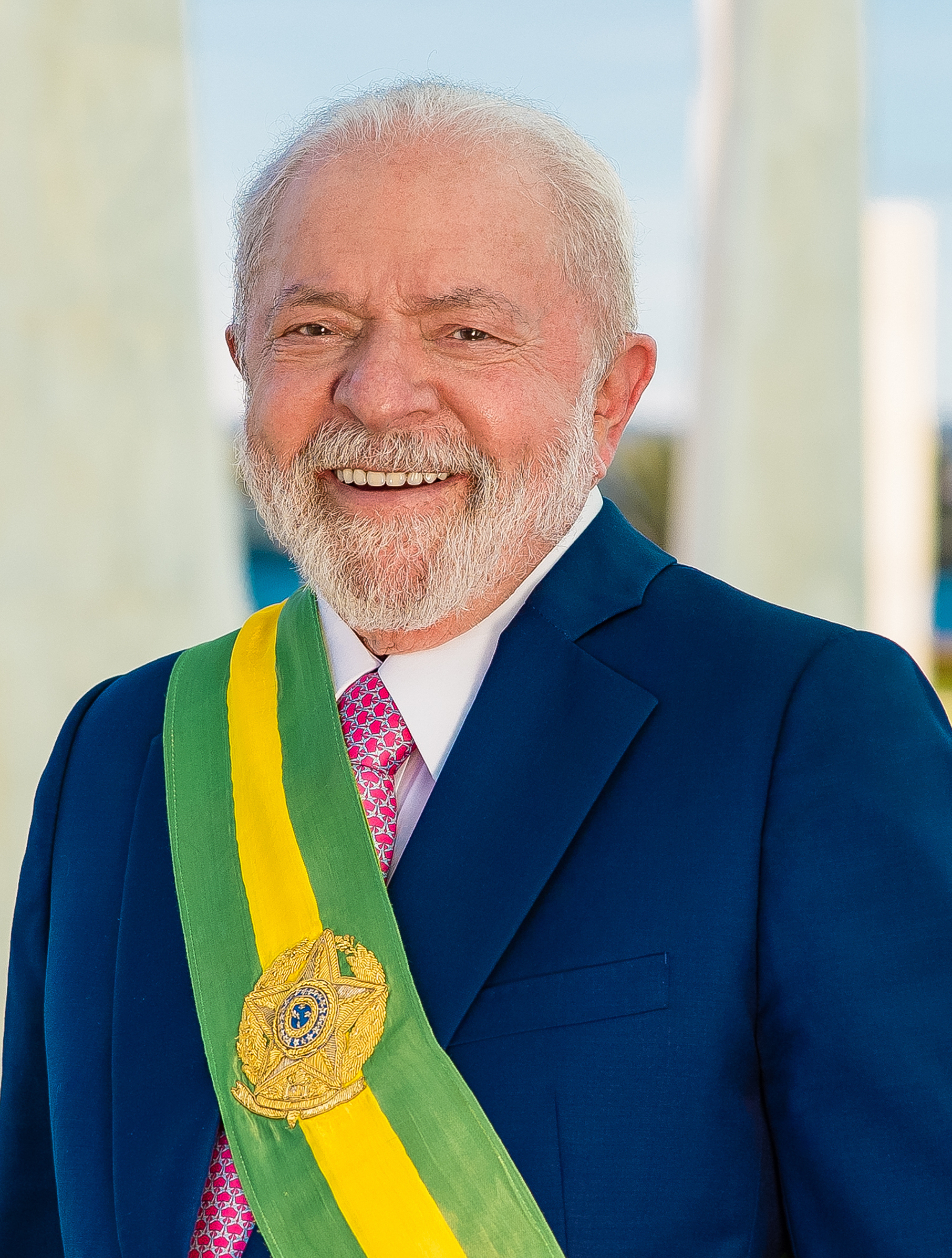
Brazil
Luiz Inácio Lula da Silva, President

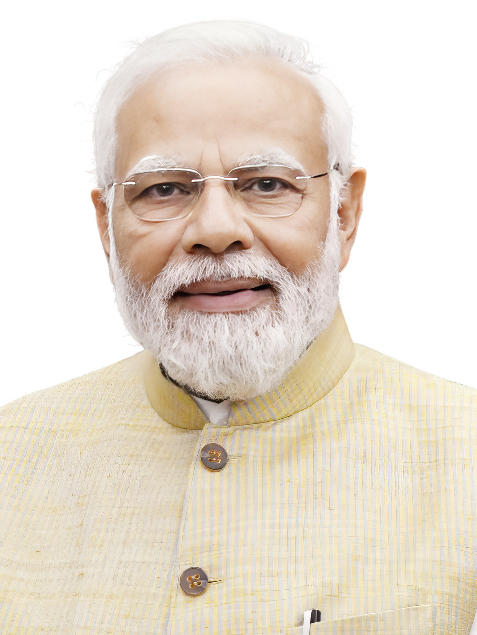
India
Narendra Modi, Prime Minister

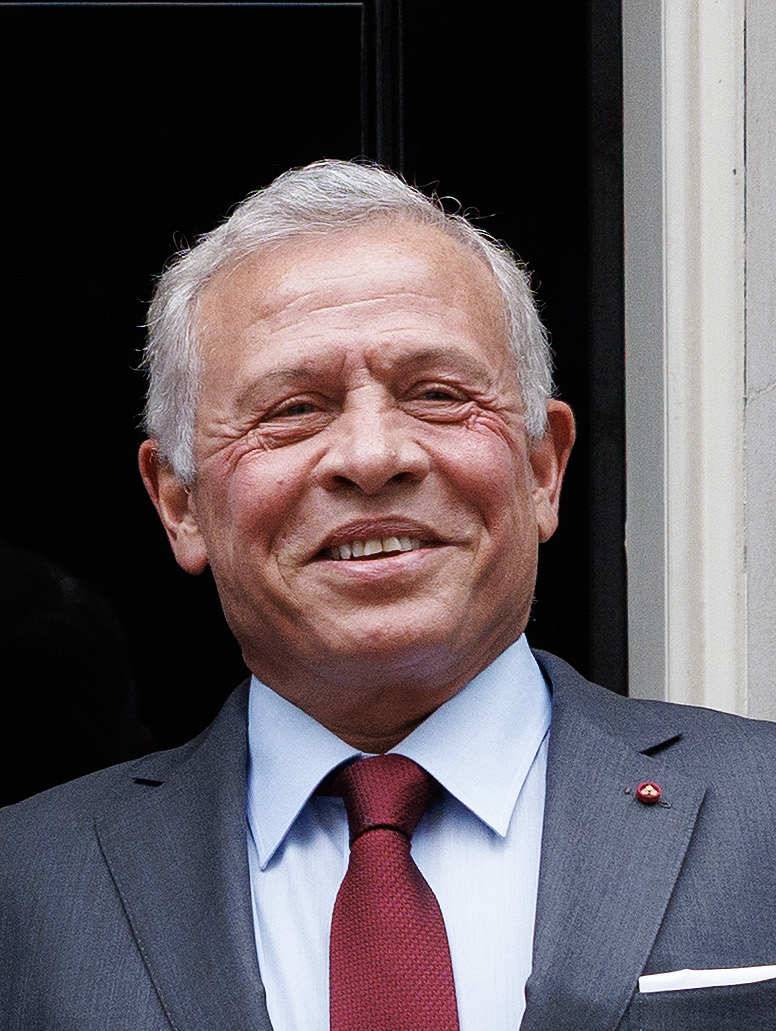
Jordan
Abdullah II, King

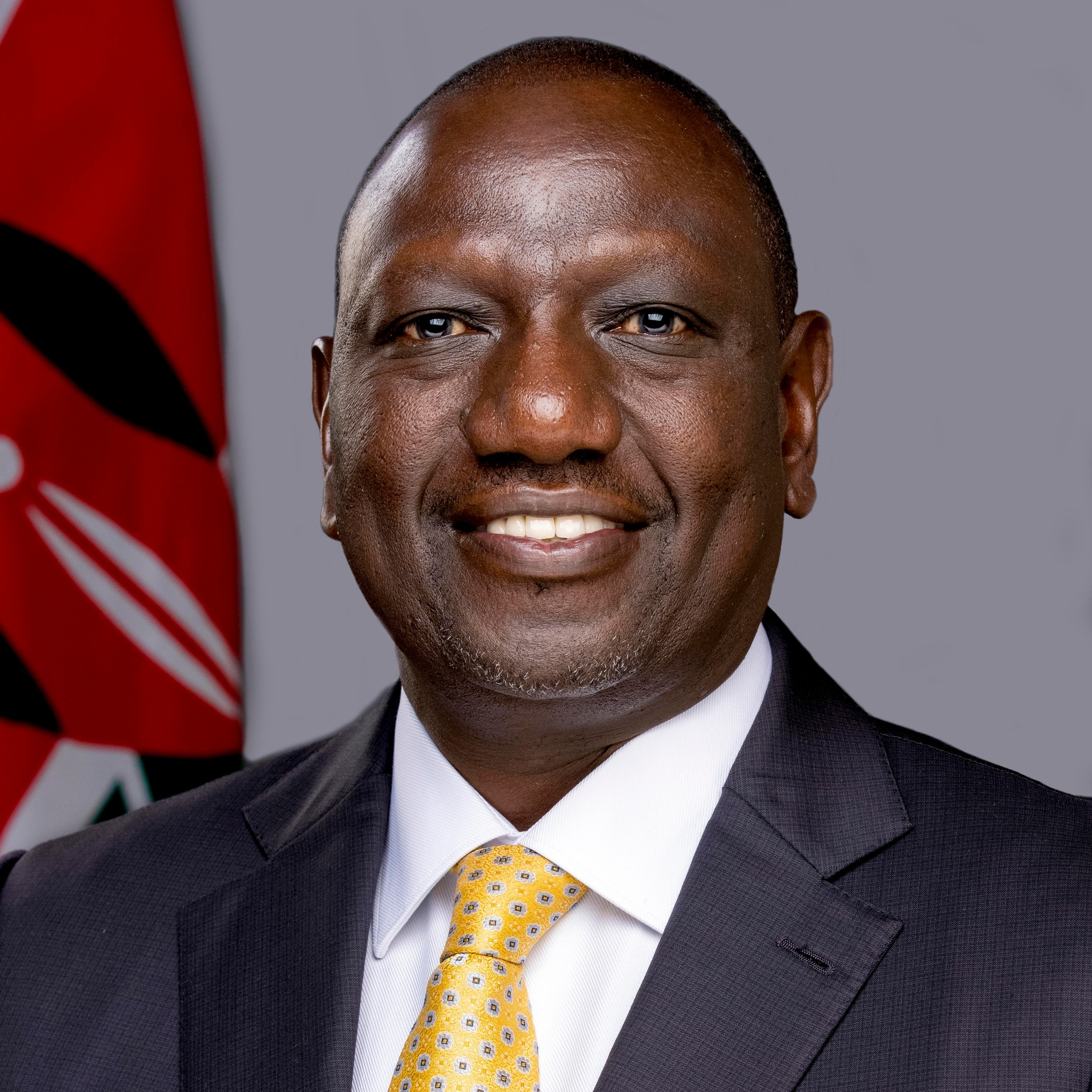
Kenya
William Ruto, President

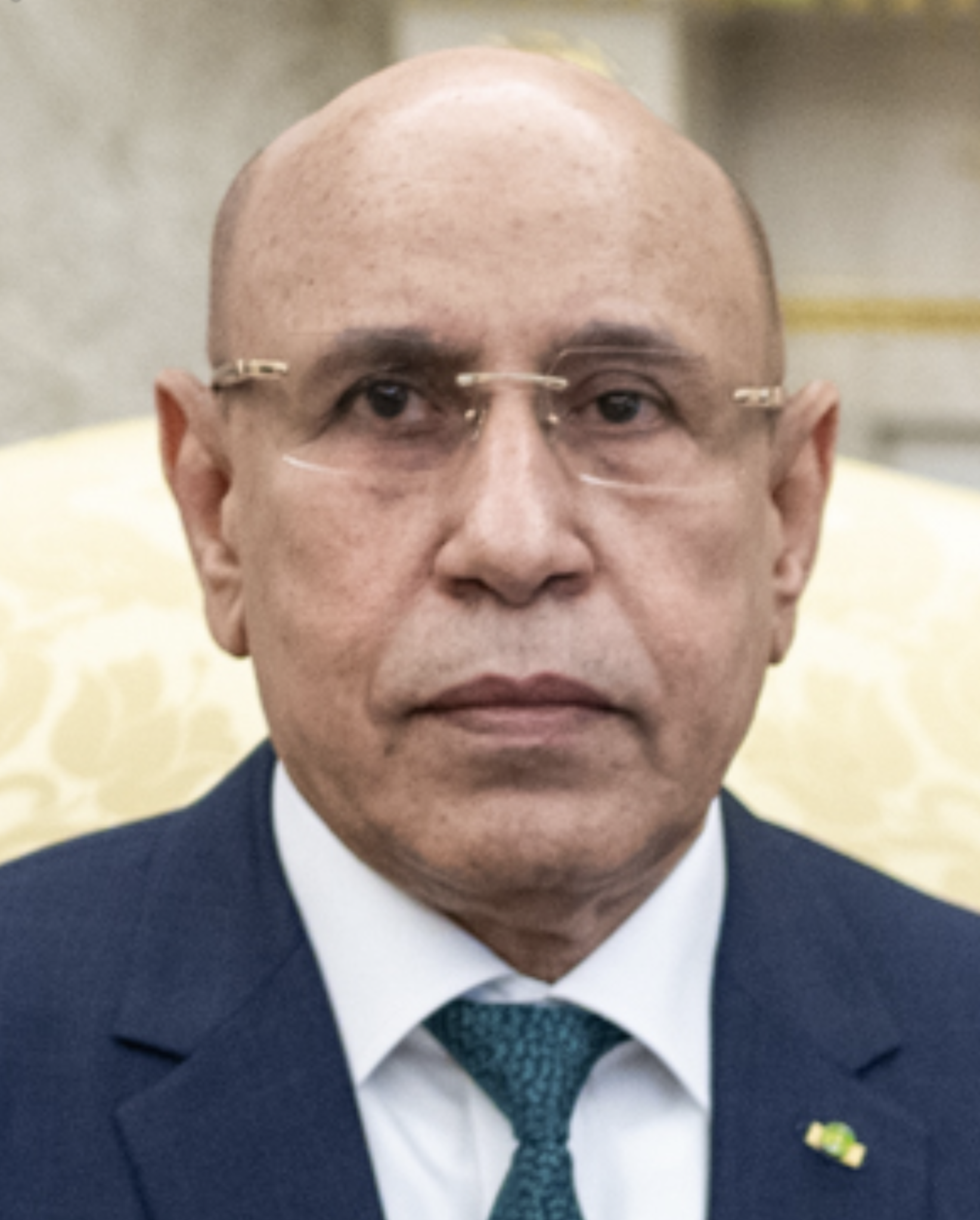
Mauritania representing the African Union
Mohamed Ould Ghazouani, 2024 Chairperson

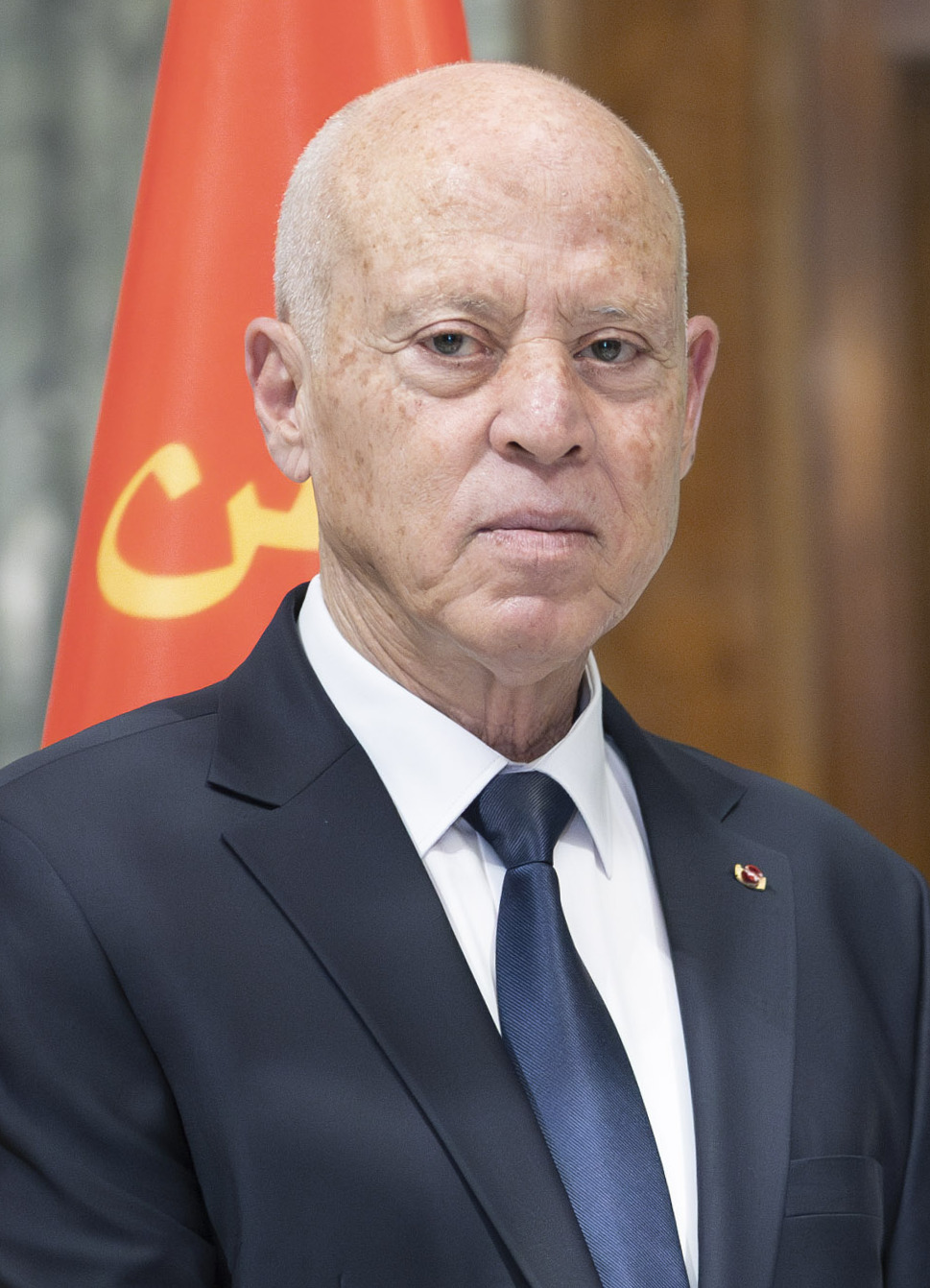
Tunisia
Kaïs Saïed, President

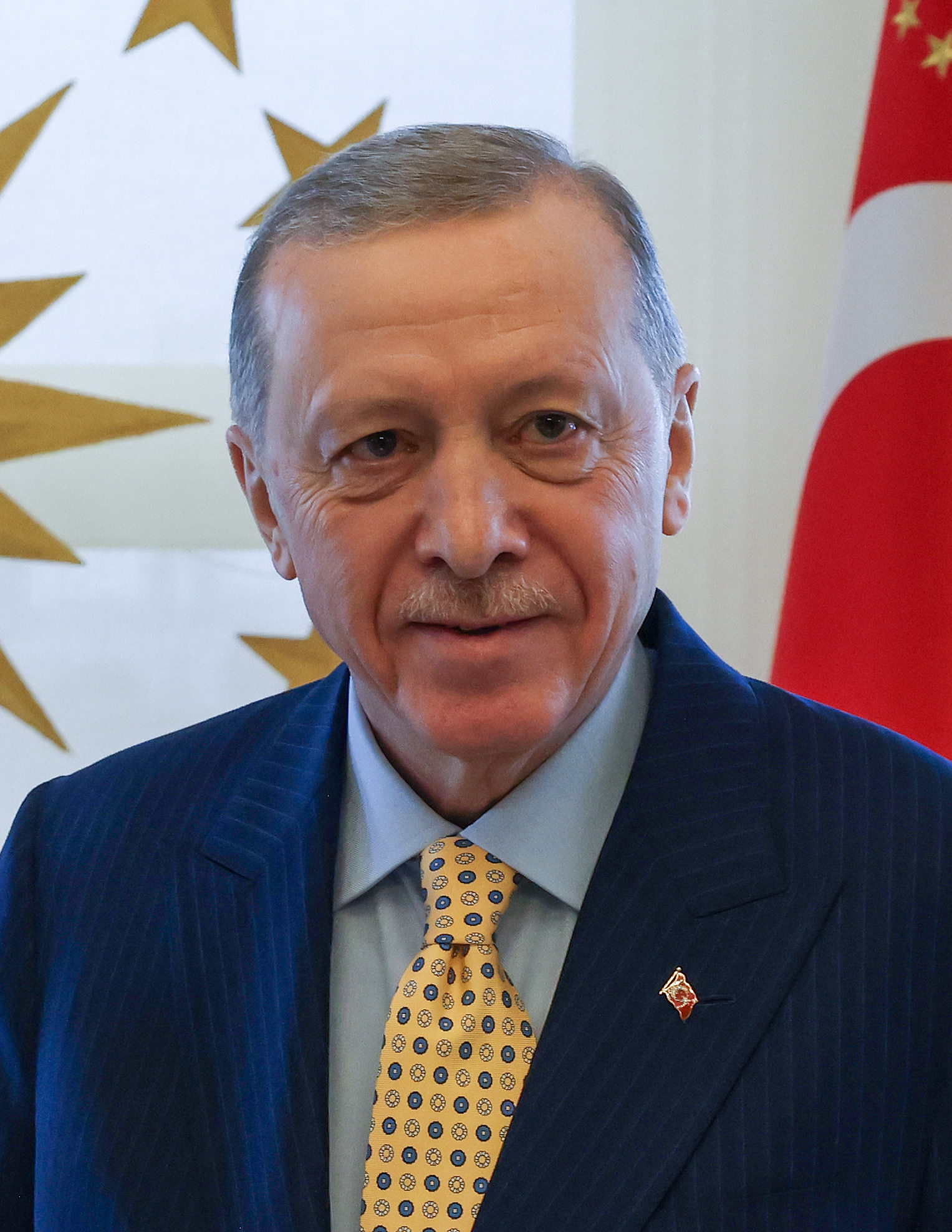
Turkey
Recep Tayyip Erdoğan, President

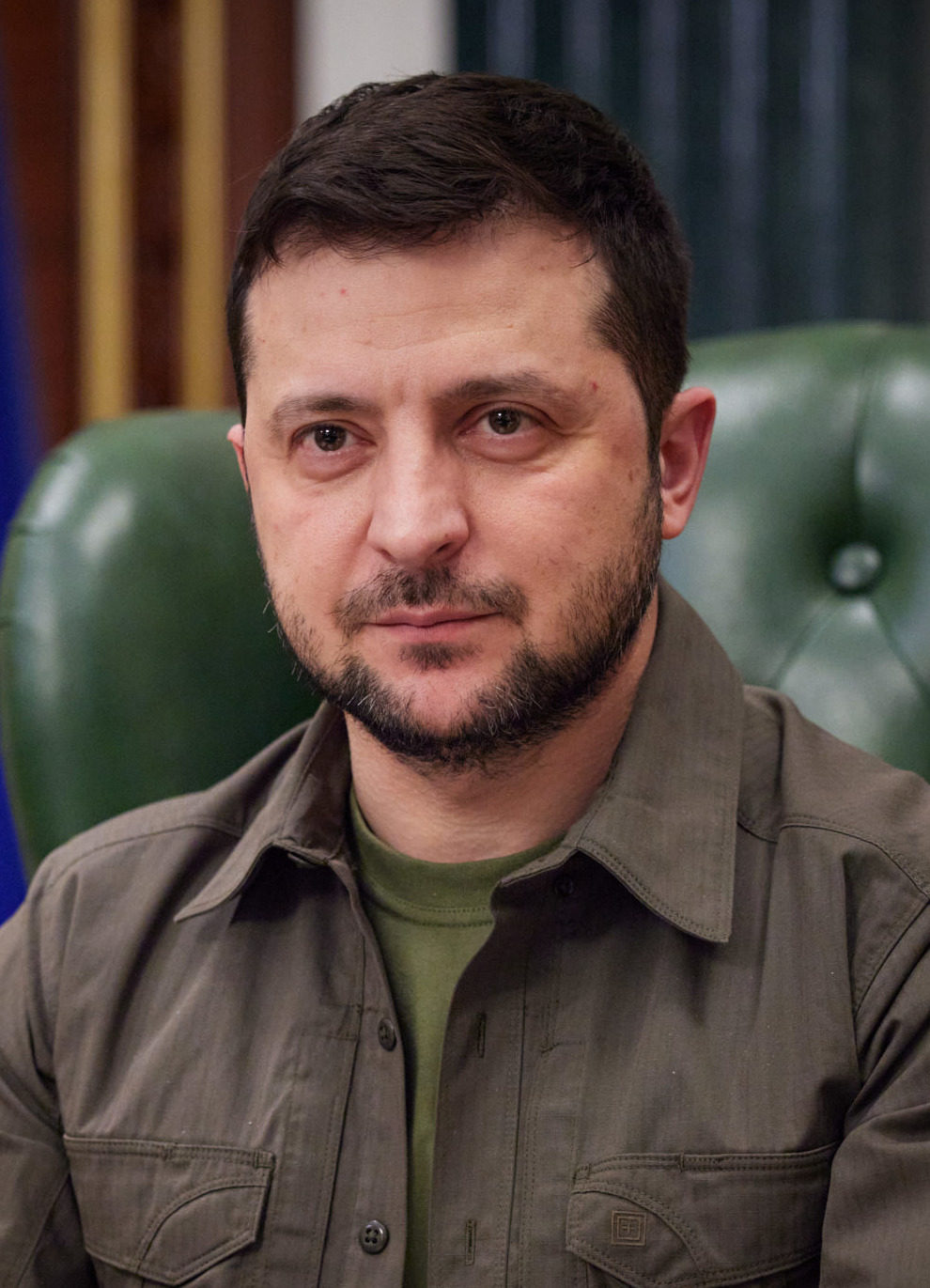
Ukraine
Volodymyr Zelenskyy, President

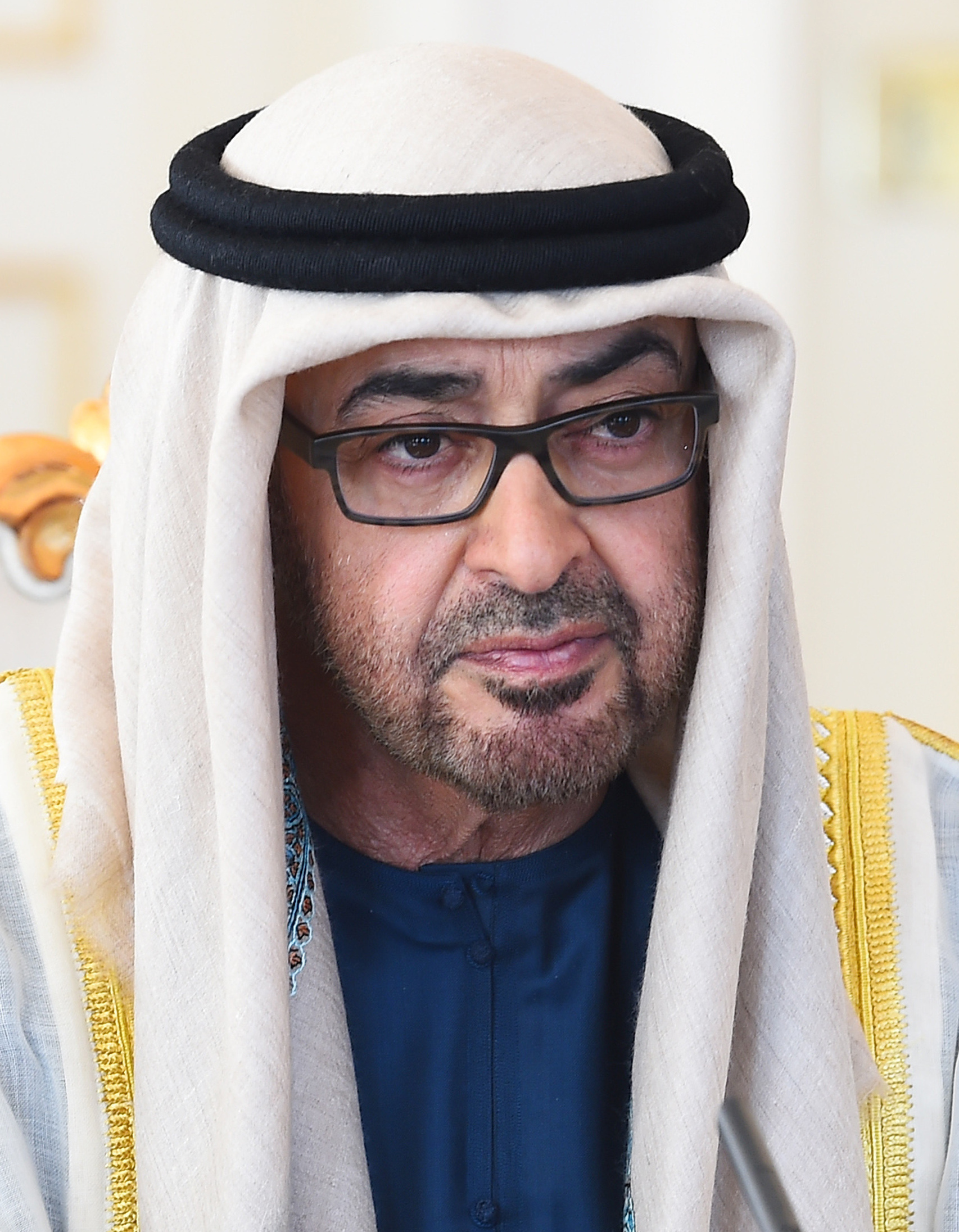
United Arab Emirates
Mohamed bin Zayed, President

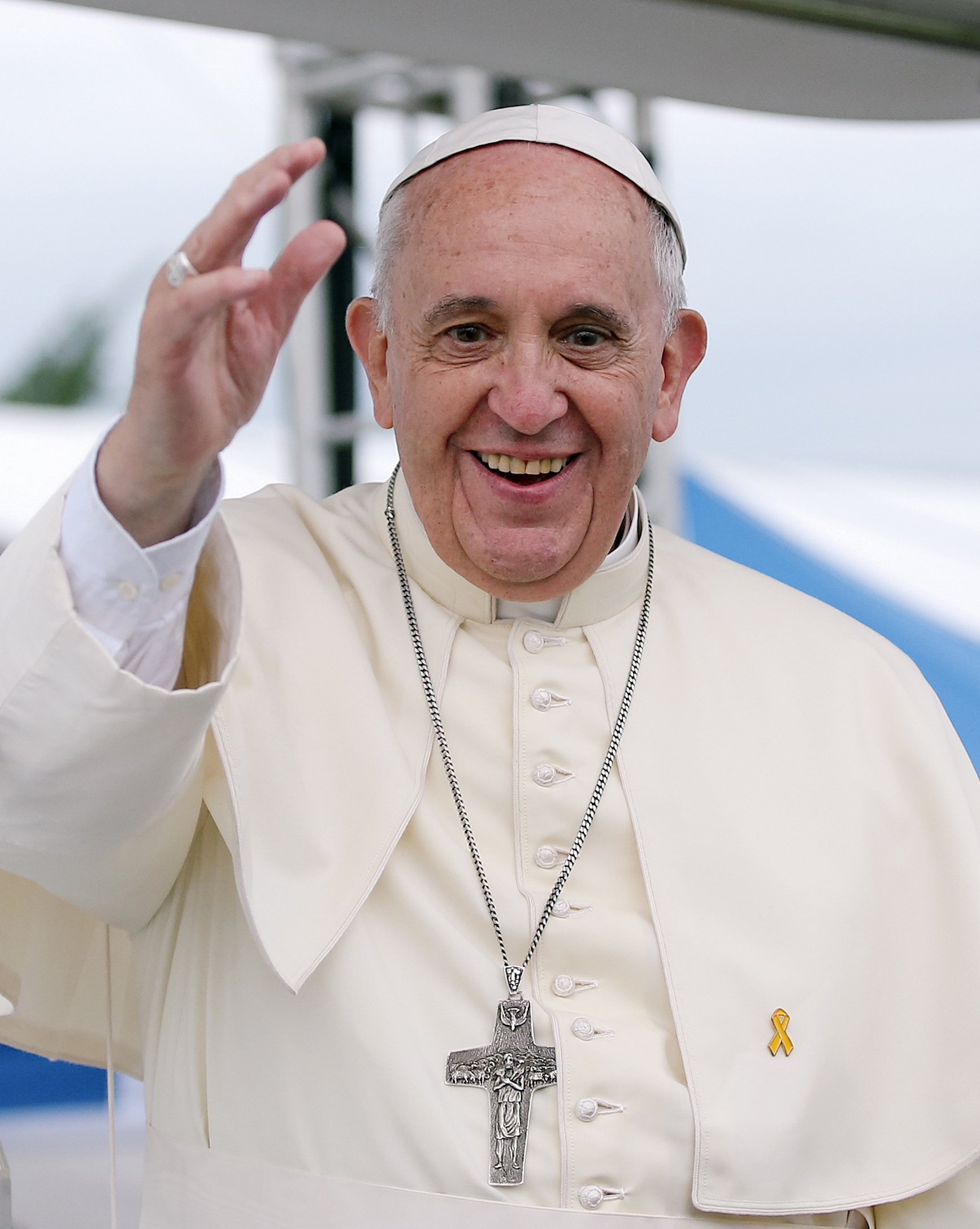
Vatican City
Pope Francis, Pope

== Participating international organization guests ==
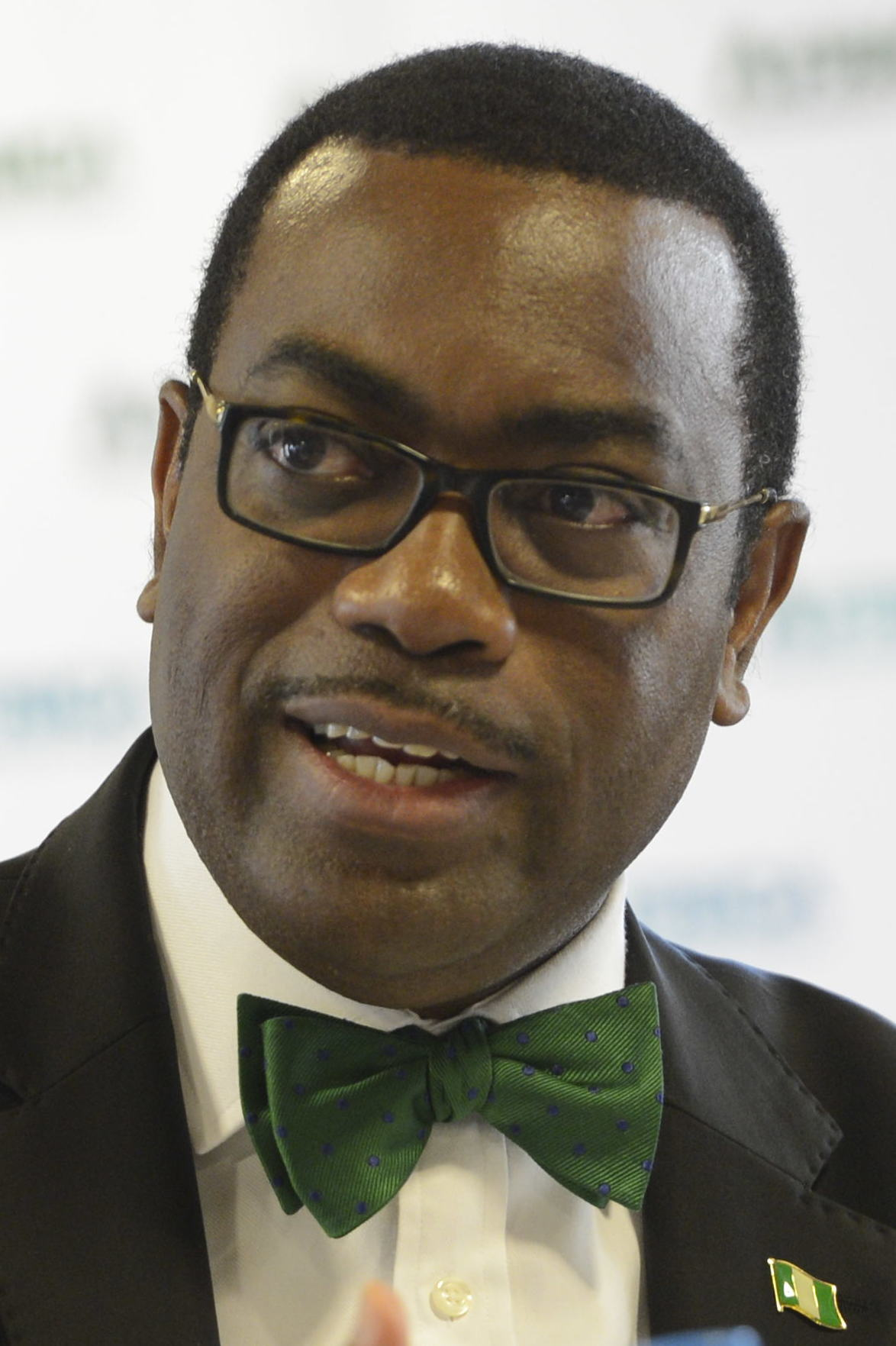
African Development Bank
Akinwumi Adesina, President

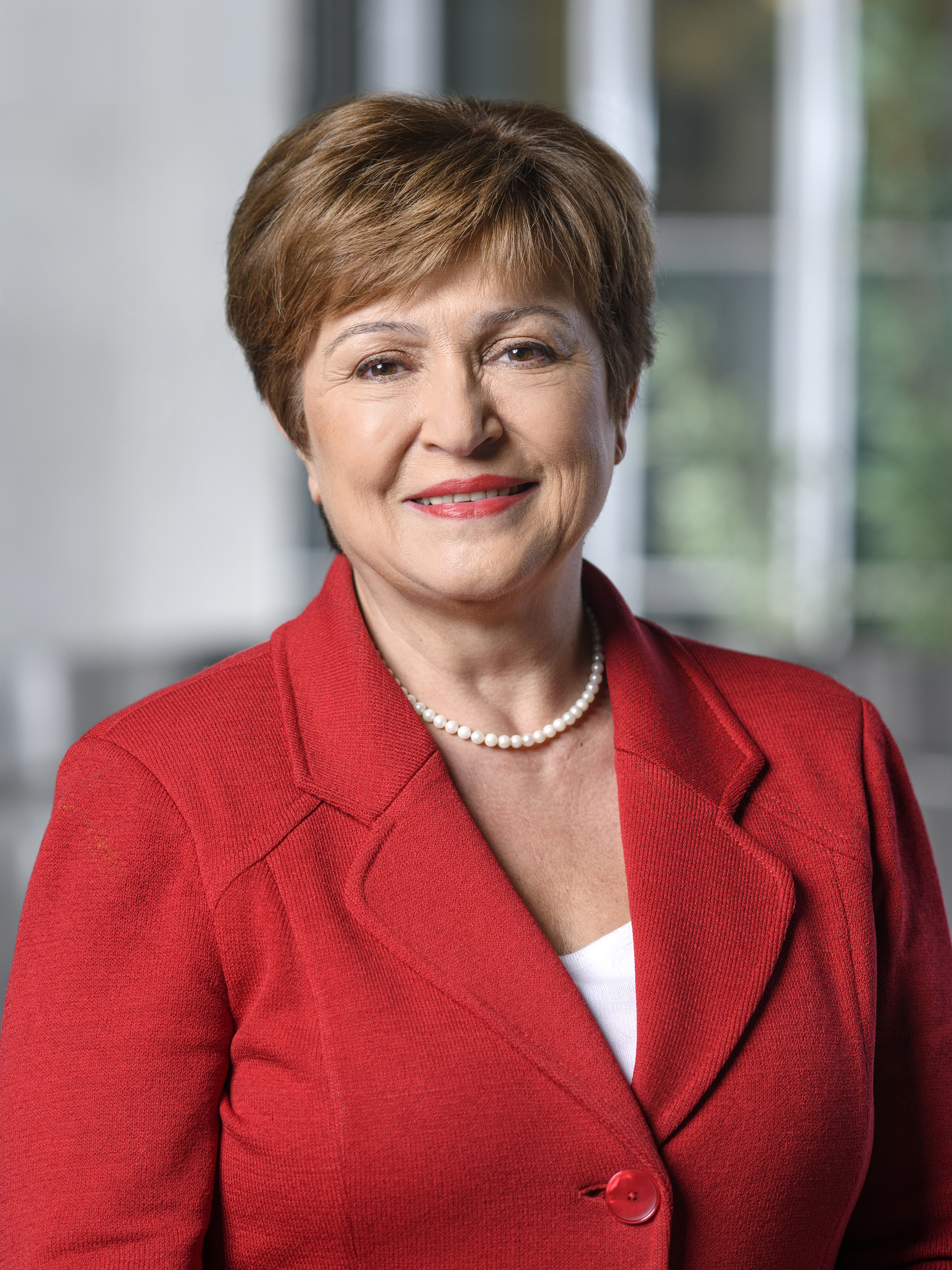
International Monetary Fund
Kristalina Georgieva, {{subst:lc:Chief Operating Officer}}

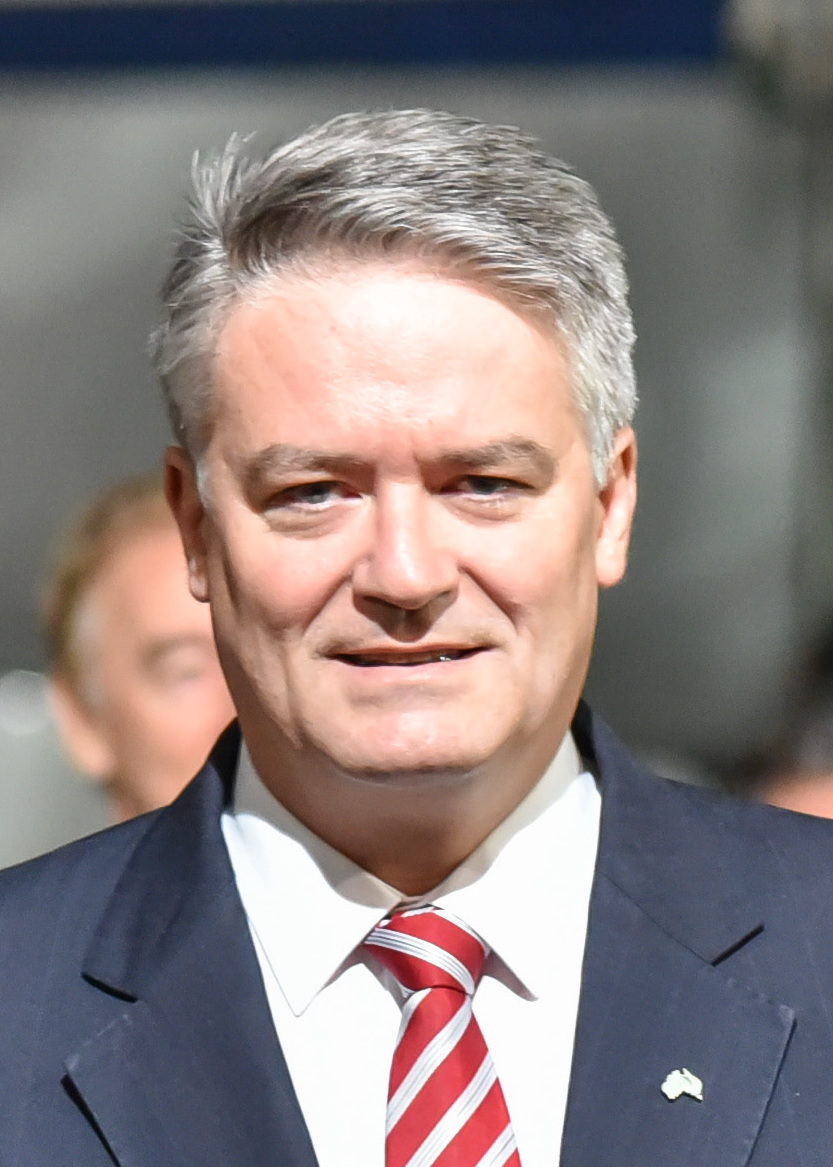
Organisation for Economic Co-operation and Development
Mathias Cormann, Secretary General

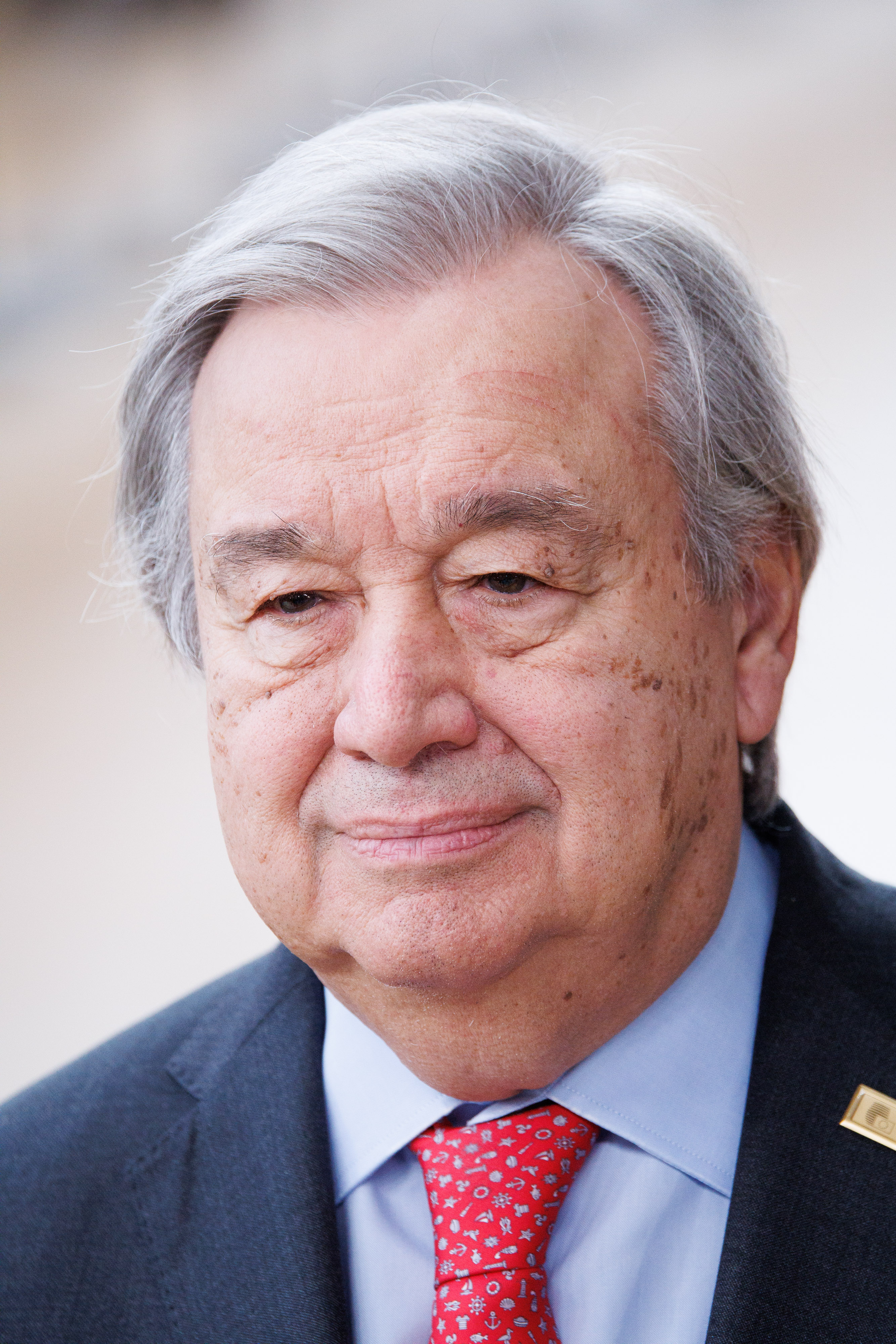
United Nations
António Guterres, Secretary General

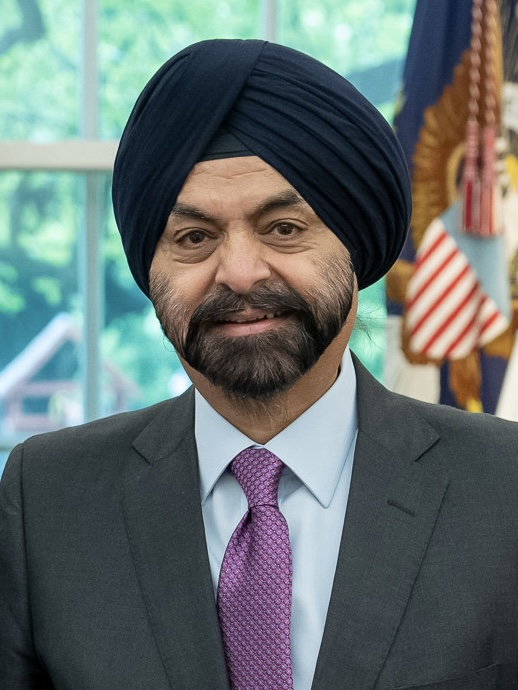
World Bank
Ajay Banga, President

== Events leading to the summit ==
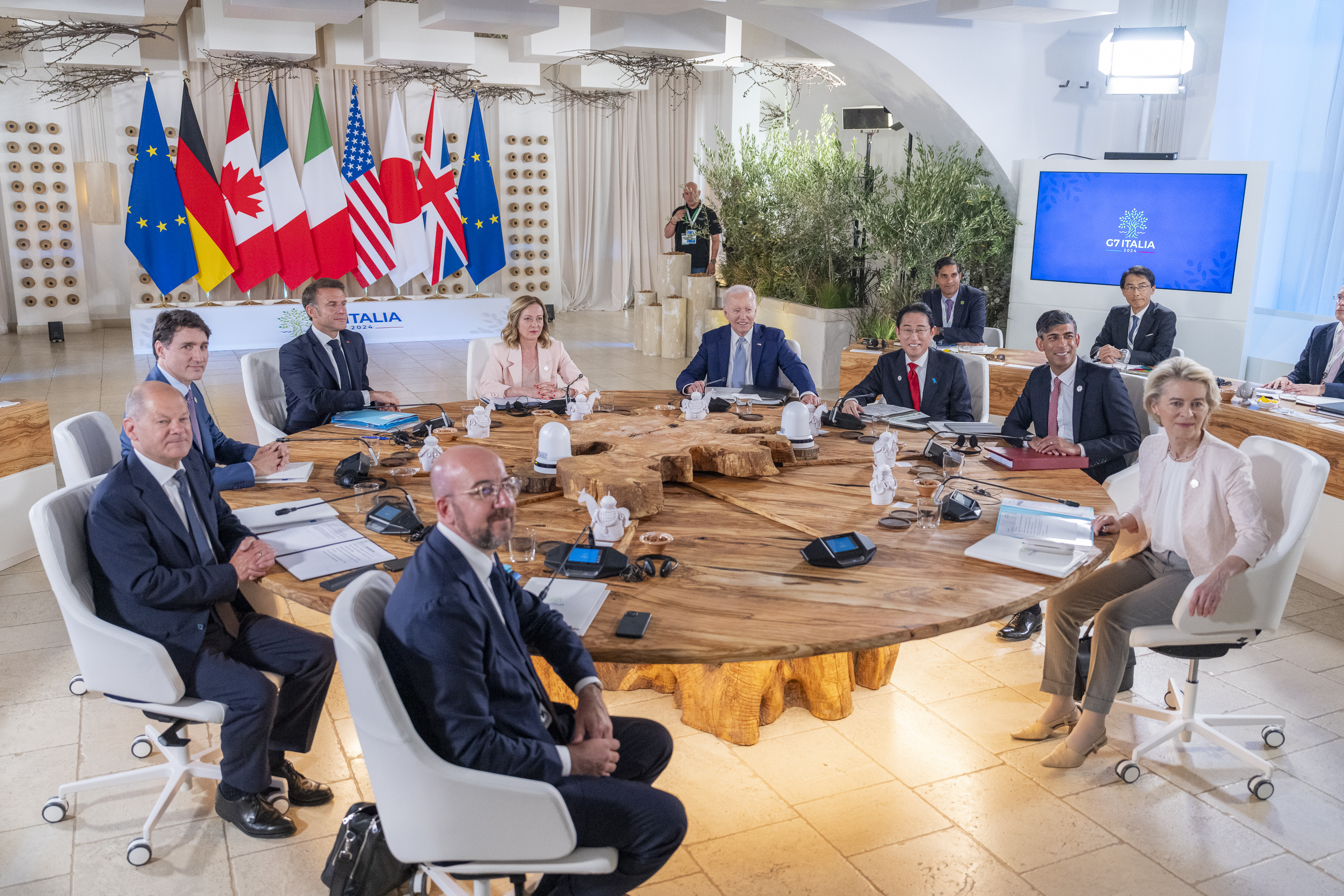
Working session on 13 June 2024

On 7 February 2024, a G7 Trade Minister's meeting was held via videoconference. A joint communiqué was issued, reaffirming the ministers' commitment to reforming the WTO and addressing global trade challenges.

On 17 February, the G7 Foreign Ministers met informally at the Munich Security Conference. As Chair of the meeting, Italy's Minister for Foreign Affairs Antonio Tajani released a statement. The ministers expressed "unwavering support" to Ukraine's sovereignty and demanded clarification on the death of Alexei Navalny. They also addressed regional conflicts in the Middle East and the Red Sea, condemning terrorist attacks and reporting concerns about Iran's nuclear program.

On 24 February, on the second anniversary of Russia's invasion of Ukraine, the first G7 Leaders videoconference was held. Prime Minister Giorgia Meloni, Chair of the meeting, attended from Kyiv along with Prime Minister Justin Trudeau of Canada, President of the European Commission Ursula von der Leyen, and President Volodymyr Zelenskyy of Ukraine. A leaders' statement was released after the conference.

Turkish President Recep Tayyip Erdoğan, who has long criticized Israel's actions in the Gaza Strip, tried to draw attention to the ongoing Gaza war.

== Outcomes ==
G7 leaders agreed to make $50 billion of loans available to Ukraine by leveraging revenue generated by immobilised Russian sovereign assets. They also backed a proposal for an immediate ceasefire in Gaza, the release of hostages, increased humanitarian assistance and a path towards a two-state solution.

Leaders launched the Energy for Growth in Africa initiative, the Apulia Food Systems Initiative and a G7 coalition to prevent and counter the smuggling of migrants. They also called for an action plan on the use of artificial intelligence in the workplace and supported implementation of the international code of conduct for organisations developing advanced AI systems. The summit's economic security language addressed non-market policies and global overcapacity, with China a recurring focus in the final communiqué.

== See also ==
- 2024 G20 Rio de Janeiro summit
- 16th BRICS summit
