= List of United States presidential visits to Western Europe =

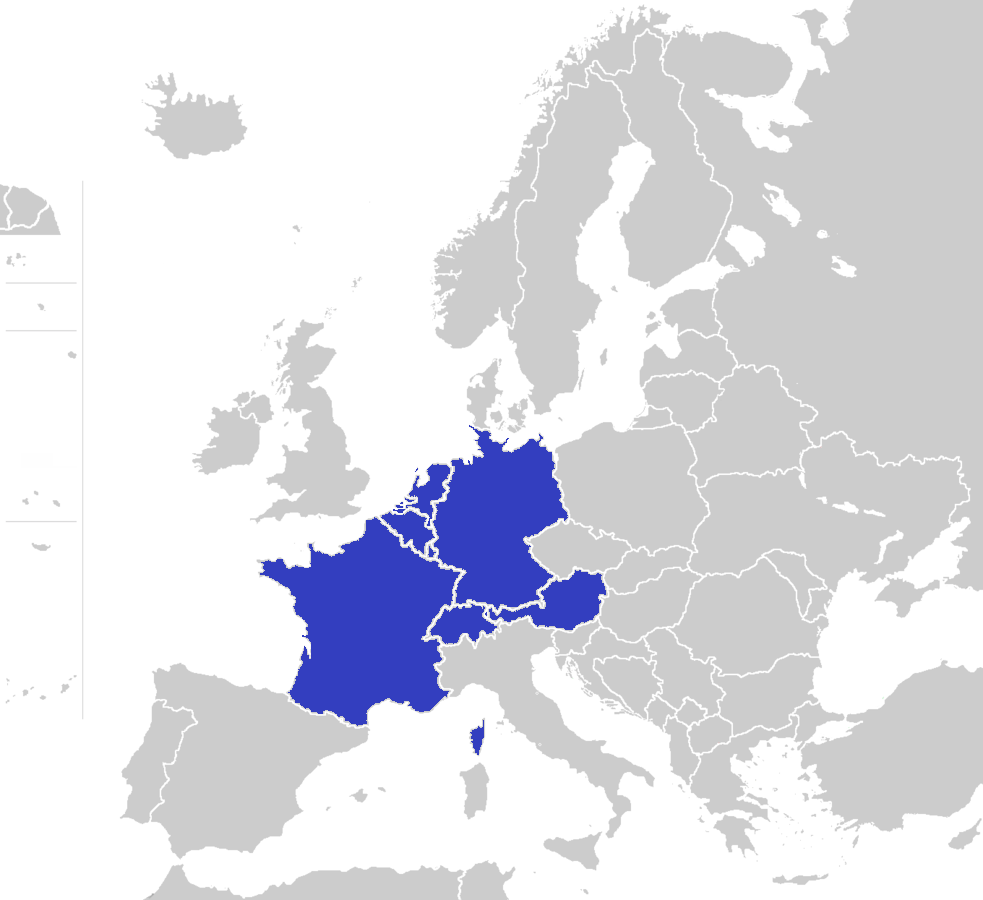
Western Europe

Thirteen United States presidents have made presidential visits to Western Europe. (Note: The United Nations Statistics Division developed a selection of geographical regions and groupings of countries and areas, which are or may be used in compilation of statistics. In this selection, the following nine countries are classified as comprising Western Europe: Austria, Belgium, France, Germany, Liechtenstein, Luxembourg, Monaco, Netherlands, and Switzerland. The assignment of countries or areas to specific groupings is for statistical convenience and does not imply any assumption regarding political or other affiliation of countries or territories by the United Nations.) The first visits by an incumbent president to countries in Western Europe were made in 1918 and 1919 by Woodrow Wilson in the aftermath of World War I. He was awarded the 1919 Nobel Peace Prize for his peacemaking efforts. Visits occurring during the 1940s through 1980s were offshoots of American diplomatic interactions following World War II and during the Cold War. To date, 42 visits have been made to France, 32 to Germany (including 10 specifically to West Germany or West Berlin), 21 to Belgium, 12 to Switzerland, six to Austria, and six to the Netherlands. No president has yet visited Liechtenstein, Luxembourg or Monaco.

== Table of visits ==
President	Dates	Countries	Locations	Key details
Woodrow Wilson	December 14–25, 1918	France	Paris, Chaumont	Attended preliminary discussions prior to the Paris Peace Conference; promoted his Fourteen Points principles for world peace. Departed the U.S. December 4.
Woodrow Wilson	December 31, 1918 – January 1, 1919	France	Paris	Stopover en route to Italy.
Woodrow Wilson	January 7–14, 1919	France	Paris	Attended Paris Peace Conference. Arrived In the U.S. February 24.
Woodrow Wilson	March 14 – June 18, 1919	France	Paris	Attended Paris Peace Conference. Departed the U.S. March 5.
Woodrow Wilson	June 18–19, 1919	Belgium	Brussels, Charleroi, Malines, Louvain	Met with King Albert I. Addressed Parliament, following Paris Peace Conference.
Woodrow Wilson	June 20–28, 1919	France	Paris	Attended the Paris Peace Conference. Returned to the U.S. on July 8.
Harry S. Truman	July 15, 1945	Belgium	Antwerp, Brussels	Disembarked en route to Potsdam.
Harry S. Truman	July 16 – August 2, 1945	Germany	Berlin, Potsdam	Attended Potsdam Conference with British prime ministers Winston Churchill and Clement Attlee and Soviet general secretary Joseph Stalin.
Dwight D. Eisenhower	July 16–23, 1955	Switzerland	Geneva	Attended summit meeting with British prime minister Anthony Eden, French premier Edgar Faure and Soviet premier Nikolai Bulganin.
Dwight D. Eisenhower	December 14–19, 1957	France	Paris	Attended the First NATO summit.
Dwight D. Eisenhower	August 26–27, 1959	West Germany	Bonn	Informal meeting with Chancellor Konrad Adenauer and President Theodor Heuss.
Dwight D. Eisenhower	September 2–4, 1959	France	Paris	Informal Meeting with President Charles de Gaulle and Italian prime minister Antonio Segni. Addressed North Atlantic Council.
Dwight D. Eisenhower	December 18–21, 1959	France	Toulon, Paris	Conference with President Charles de Gaulle, British prime minister Harold Macmillan and German chancellor Konrad Adenauer.
Dwight D. Eisenhower	May 15–19, 1960	France	Paris	Conference with President Charles de Gaulle, British prime minister Harold Macmillan and Soviet First Secretary Nikita Khrushchev.
John F. Kennedy	May 31 – June 3, 1961	France	Paris	State Visit. Addressed North Atlantic Council. Met with President Charles de Gaulle.
John F. Kennedy	June 3–4, 1961	Austria	Vienna	Met with President Adolf Schärf. held talks with Soviet First Secretary Nikita Khrushchev.
John F. Kennedy	June 23–26, 1963	West Germany	Bonn, Cologne, Frankfurt, Wiesbaden, West Berlin	Met with Chancellor Adenauer and other officials. Delivered several public addresses.
Lyndon B. Johnson	April 23–26, 1967	West Germany	Bonn	Attended funeral of Chancellor Adenauer and conversed with various heads of state.
Richard Nixon	February 23–24, 1969	Belgium	Brussels	Attended the 23rd meeting of North Atlantic Council. Met with King Baudouin I.
Richard Nixon	February 26–27, 1969	West Germany	Bonn, West Berlin	Addressed the Bundestag.
Richard Nixon	February 28 – March 2, 1969	France	Paris	Met with President Charles de Gaulle.
Richard Nixon	November 12, 1970	France	Paris	Attended the memorial services for former President Charles de Gaulle.
Richard Nixon	May 20–22, 1972	Austria	Salzburg	Informal visit. Met with Chancellor Bruno Kreisky.
Richard Nixon	April 5–7, 1974	France	Paris	Attended the memorial services for former president Georges Pompidou. Met afterward with interim president Alain Poher, Italian president Giovanni Leone, British prime minister Harold Wilson, West German chancellor Willy Brandt, Danish prime minister Poul Hartling, Soviet head of state Nikolai Podgorny and Japanese prime minister Kakuei Tanaka.
Richard Nixon	June 10–12, 1974	Austria	Salzburg	Met with Chancellor Bruno Kreisky.
Richard Nixon	June 25–26, 1974	Belgium	Brussels	Attended the 2nd NATO Summit Meeting. Met separately with King Baudouin I and Queen Fabiola, Prime Minister Leo Tindemans, and with German chancellor Helmut Schmidt, British prime minister Harold Wilson and Italian prime minister Mariano Rumor.
Gerald R. Ford	May 28–31, 1975	Belgium	Brussels	Attended the 3rd NATO Summit Meeting. Addressed the North Atlantic Council and met separately with NATO Heads of State and Government.
Gerald R. Ford	June 1–3, 1975	Austria	Salzburg	Met with Chancellor Bruno Kreisky and Egyptian president Anwar Sadat.
Gerald R. Ford	July 26–28, 1975	West Germany	Bonn; Linz am Rhein	Met with President Walter Scheel and Chancellor Helmut Schmidt.
Gerald R. Ford	November 15–17, 1975	France	Rambouillet	Attended the 1st G6 summit.
Jimmy Carter	January 4–6, 1978	France	Paris, Normandy, Bayeux, Versailles	Met with President Valéry Giscard d'Estaing and Prime Minister Raymond Barre.
Jimmy Carter	January 6, 1978	Belgium	Brussels	Met with King Baudouin and Prime Minister Leo Tindemans. Attended meetings of the Commission of the European Communities and the North Atlantic Council.
Jimmy Carter	July 14–15, 1978	West Germany	Bonn, Wiesbaden-Erbenheim, Frankfurt, West Berlin	State visit; met with President Scheel and Chancellor Schmidt. Addressed U.S. and German military personnel at Wiesbaden Army Airfield, and spoke at the Berlin Airlift Monument.
Jimmy Carter	June 14–18, 1979	Austria	Vienna	State visit. Met with President Rudolf Kirchschläger and Chancellor Bruno Kreisky. Met with Soviet general secretary Leonid Brezhnev to sign SALT II Treaty.
Ronald Reagan	June 2–7, 1982	France	Paris, Versailles	State Visit. Met with President François Mitterrand and Prime Minister Pierre Mauroy. Attended the 8th G7 summit.
Ronald Reagan	June 9–11, 1982	West Germany	Bonn, West Berlin	State visit; met with Chancellor Schmidt and President Karl Carstens; addressed the Bundestag; and attended a meeting of the North Atlantic Council.
Ronald Reagan	June 6, 1984	France	Normandy	Attended commemorative ceremonies of the 40th anniversary of the Allied landing in Normandy. Also present were Canadian prime minister Pierre Trudeau, Queen Beatrix of the Netherlands, King Olav V of Norway, King Baudouin I of Belgium, French president François Mitterrand, Queen Elizabeth II of the United Kingdom and Jean, Grand Duke of Luxembourg.
Ronald Reagan	April 30 – May 6, 1985	West Germany	Bonn, Bergen-Belsen, Bitburg, Hambach Castle; West Berlin	State visit; attended ceremonies commemorating 40th anniversary of the end of World War II in Europe. Attended 11th G7 summit.
Ronald Reagan	May 8, 1985	France	Strasbourg	Addressed the European Parliament.
Ronald Reagan	November 21, 1985	Belgium	Brussels	Attended the 7th NATO Summit Meeting. Present were the Heads of State and Government of Belgium, Canada, Denmark, Federal Republic of Germany, Italy, the Netherlands, Norway, Luxembourg, Portugal, Turkey and the United Kingdom.
Ronald Reagan	November 16–21, 1985	Switzerland	Geneva	Attended the Summit Meeting with new Soviet general secretary Mikhail Gorbachev. Met also with Swiss president Kurt Furgler.
Ronald Reagan	June 11–12, 1987	West Germany	West Berlin, Bonn	Delivered a speech at the commemoration of Berlin's 750th anniversary; met with Chancellor Helmut Kohl.
Ronald Reagan	March 1–3, 1988	Belgium	Brussels	Attended the 1988 Brussels summit. Present were the Heads of State and Government of Canada, Denmark, France, Federal Republic of Germany, Greece, Iceland, Italy, Luxembourg, Norway, Portugal, Spain, Turkey and the United Kingdom.
George H. W. Bush	May 28–30, 1989	Belgium	Brussels	Attended the May 1989 NATO summit. Present were the Heads of State and Government of Canada, Denmark, France, Federal Republic of Germany, Greece, Iceland, Italy, Luxembourg, Norway, Portugal, Spain, Turkey, and the United Kingdom.
George H. W. Bush	May 30–31, 1989	West Germany	Bonn, Mainz	Met with Chancellor Kohl.
George H. W. Bush	July 13–17, 1989	France	Paris	Attended the 15th G7 summit. Also attended ceremonies for the Bicentennial of the French Revolution. Met with Ivorian president Félix Houphouët-Boigny.
George H. W. Bush	July 17–18, 1989	Netherlands	The Hague, Leiden	Met with Queen Beatrix and Prime Minister Ruud Lubbers. Delivered a public address.
George H. W. Bush	December 3–4, 1989	Belgium	Brussels	Attended the December 1989 Brussels summit Meeting and briefed leaders on the U.S.–Soviet Summit Meeting.
George H. W. Bush	November 18, 1990	Germany	Speyer, Ludwigshafen	Met with Chancellor Kohl.
George H. W. Bush	November 18–21, 1990	France	Paris	Attended the CSCE Summit Meeting and the signing of the Treaty on Conventional Armed Forces in Europe.
George H. W. Bush	November 23, 1990	Switzerland	Geneva	Discussed the Persian Gulf crisis with Syrian president Hafez al-Assad.
George H. W. Bush	July 14, 1991	France	Rambouillet	Discussed further sanctions against Iraq with President François Mitterrand.
George H. W. Bush	November 8–9, 1991	Netherlands	The Hague	Attended the European Community Summit Meeting.
George H. W. Bush	July 5–8, 1992	Germany	Munich	Attended 18th G7 summit. Also met with Russian president Boris Yeltsin.
George H. W. Bush	January 3–5, 1993	France	Paris	Discussed the Bosnian crisis with President François Mitterrand.
Bill Clinton	January 9–11, 1994	Belgium	Brussels	Attended the 13th NATO Summit Meeting. Met with King Albert II and Prime Minister Jean-Luc Dehaene.
Bill Clinton	January 15–16, 1994	Switzerland	Geneva	Met with Syrian President Hafez al-Assad.
Bill Clinton	June 6–8, 1994	France	Colleville, Paris	Attended the 50th anniversary of D-Day memorial ceremonies. Met with President François Mitterrand and senior French officials. Addressed the French National Assembly.
Bill Clinton	July 10–12, 1994	Germany	Bonn, Oggersheim, Berlin	Met with Chancellor Kohl and German political leaders. Delivered a public address at the Brandenburg Gate and attended deactivation ceremony for the Berlin Brigade.
Bill Clinton	December 2, 1995	Germany	Baumholder	Addressed U.S. military personnel and met with Chancellor Kohl.
Bill Clinton	December 14, 1995	France	Paris	Attended the signing of the Bosnian peace treaty.
Bill Clinton	June 27–29, 1996	France	Lyon, Pérouges, Paris	Attended the 22nd G7 summit. Met with Russian prime minister Viktor Chernomyrdin and UN Secretary-General Boutros Boutros-Ghali.
Bill Clinton	May 26–27, 1997	France	Paris	Attended the NATO Summit Meeting and the signing of the NATO-Russia Founding Act.
Bill Clinton	May 27–28, 1997	Netherlands	The Hague, Rotterdam	Attended the U.S.–EU Summit Meeting. Attended the 50th anniversary of the Marshall Plan.
Bill Clinton	May 12–14, 1998	Germany	Berlin, Potsdam, Frankfurt, Eisenach	Met with Chancellor Kohl; commemorated 50th anniversary of the Berlin Airlift.
Bill Clinton	May 18, 1998	Switzerland	Geneva	Attended the World Trade Organization meeting commemorating the 50th anniversary of GATT.
Bill Clinton	May 4, 1999	Belgium	Brussels	Discussed the Kosovo War with NATO officials.
Bill Clinton	May 4–6, 1999	Germany	Frankfurt, Ramstein Air Base, Spangdahlem Air Base, Bonn, Ingelheim	Addressed U.S. military personnel; met with Chancellor Gerhard Schröder; met with Kosovo War refugees.
Bill Clinton	June 16, 1999	Switzerland	Geneva	Addressed International Labour Organization Conference. Met with President Ruth Dreifuss.
Bill Clinton	June 16–17, 1999	France	Paris	Discussed peacekeeping in Kosovo with President Jacques Chirac and Prime Minister Lionel Jospin.
Bill Clinton	June 17–21, 1999	Germany	Cologne, Bonn	Attended 25th G8 summit.
Bill Clinton	January 29, 2000	Switzerland	Davos	Addressed the World Economic Forum.
Bill Clinton	March 25, 2000	Switzerland	Geneva	Met with Syrian President Hafez al-Assad.
Bill Clinton	June 1–3, 2000	Germany	Berlin, Aachen	Met with President Johannes Rau and Chancellor Schröder; received Charlemagne Prize, and attended a Third Way Conference.
George W. Bush	June 13–14, 2001	Belgium	Brussels	Attended the special Meeting of the North Atlantic Council. Met with King Albert II and Prime Minister Guy Verhofstadt.
George W. Bush	May 22–23, 2002	Germany	Berlin	Met with Chancellor Schröder and addressed the Bundestag.
George W. Bush	May 26–27, 2002	France	Paris, Sainte-Mère-Église, Colleville	Met with President Jacques Chirac. Delivered a Memorial Day address in Normandy.
George W. Bush	June 1–2, 2003	France	Evian-les-Bains	Attended the 29th G8 summit. Met with Chinese president and CCP General Secretary Hu Jintao.
George W. Bush	June 5–6, 2004	France	Paris, Colleville, Caen, Arromanches	Met with President Jacques Chirac. Attended the 60th anniversary of D-Day ceremonies.
George W. Bush	February 20–23, 2005	Belgium	Brussels	Attended the NATO and EU Summit Meetings.
George W. Bush	February 23, 2005	Germany	Mainz, Wiesbaden	Met with Chancellor Schröder and visited U.S. military personnel.
George W. Bush	May 7–8, 2005	Netherlands	Maastricht, Valkenburg, Margraten	Met with Prime Minister Jan Peter Balkenende. Delivered address at the Netherlands American Cemetery, marking the 60th anniversary of the end of World War II in Europe.
George W. Bush	June 20–21, 2006	Austria	Vienna	Attended the U.S.–EU summit meeting.
George W. Bush	July 12–14, 2006	Germany	Stralsund, Trinwillershagen	Met with Chancellor Angela Merkel.
George W. Bush	June 5–8, 2007	Germany	Heiligendamm	Attended the 33rd G8 summit. Also met with Chinese president and CCP General Secretary Hu Jintao.
George W. Bush	June 10–11, 2008	Germany	Meseberg	Met with Chancellor Angela Merkel.
George W. Bush	June 13–15, 2008	France	Paris	Met with President Nicolas Sarkozy. Addressed the OECD. Attended wreath-laying ceremonies at the Suresnes American Cemetery and Memorial and Mémorial de la France combattante.
Barack Obama	April 3–4, 2009	Germany	Baden-Baden, Kehl	Attended the NATO Summit Meeting.
Barack Obama	April 3–4, 2009	France	Strasbourg	Attended the NATO Summit Meeting.
Barack Obama	June 4–5, 2009	Germany	Dresden, Weimar, Landstuhl	Met with Chancellor Angela Merkel, visited the Buchenwald concentration camp and visited wounded U.S. military personnel
Barack Obama	June 5–7, 2009	France	Paris, Caen, Normandy	Met with President Nicolas Sarkozy and dedicated the new visitor center at the U.S. Military Cemetery in Normandy.
Barack Obama	May 26–27, 2011	France	Deauville, Paris	Attended the 37th G8 summit.
Barack Obama	November 3–4, 2011	France	Cannes	Attended the G20 summit.
Barack Obama	June 18–19, 2013	Germany	Berlin	Met with President Joachim Gauck and Chancellor Angela Merkel.
Barack Obama	March 24–25, 2014	Netherlands	Amsterdam, The Hague	Attended the Nuclear Security Summit. Also attended the G7 summit on the crisis in Ukraine and the annexation of Crimea by the Russian Federation. Met with Prime Minister Mark Rutte. Also met with King Willem-Alexander at the Royal Palace of Amsterdam.
Barack Obama	March 26–27, 2014	Belgium	Waregem, Brussels	EU Summit meeting with the president of the European Council and the president of the European Commission. While in Belgium, the president also held bilateral events with Belgian Federal Government officials and with the NATO Secretary General. Laid wreath and toured the Flanders Field American Cemetery and Memorial with King Philippe and Prime Minister Elio Di Rupo. Delivered a speech at the Centre for Fine Arts (BOZAR).
Barack Obama	June 4–5, 2014	Belgium	Brussels	Met with King Philippe and Prime Minister Elio Di Rupo. Attended meetings of the G-7 leaders.
Barack Obama	June 5–6, 2014	France	Paris, Omaha Beach, Benouville, Ouistreham	Met with President François Hollande. Attended the 70th anniversary of D-Day memorial ceremonies.
Barack Obama	June 7–8, 2015	Germany	Schloss Elmau	Attended the 41st G7 summit. He also met with Chancellor Merkel for a traditional Frühschoppen breakfast with the village locals in Krün.
Barack Obama	November 29 – December 1, 2015	France	Paris	Attended the United Nations Climate Change Conference. Joined President François Hollande and Paris Mayor Anne Hidalgo in paying respects to the victims of the Paris attacks by laying flowers in front of the Bataclan.
Barack Obama	April 24–25, 2016	Germany	Hanover	Met with Chancellor Angela Merkel, French president François Hollande, Italian prime minister Matteo Renzi, and British prime minister David Cameron. Toured Hannover Messe.
Barack Obama	November 16–18, 2016	Germany	Berlin	Met with Chancellor Angela Merkel, French president François Hollande, Italian prime minister Matteo Renzi, and British prime minister Theresa May.
Donald Trump	May 24–25, 2017	Belgium	Brussels	Attended the NATO summit.
Donald Trump	July 6–8, 2017	Germany	Hamburg	Attended the G-20 summit.
Donald Trump	July 13–14, 2017	France	Paris	Met with President Emmanuel Macron. Participated in the Bastille Day celebrations marking the 100th anniversary of the Entry of the United States into World War I.
Donald Trump	January 25–26, 2018	Switzerland	Davos	Attended the World Economic Forum.
Donald Trump	July 10–12, 2018	Belgium	Brussels	Attended the NATO summit.
Donald Trump	November 9–11, 2018	France	Paris	Met with President Emmanuel Macron. Attended the international ceremony marking the 100th anniversary of the Armistice with Germany that brought major hostilities of World War I to an end. Visited the Suresnes American Cemetery and Memorial.
Donald Trump	December 26, 2018	Germany	Ramstein Air Base	Visited service members at Ramstein Air Base in Germany on his way back from Iraq.
Donald Trump	June 6, 2019	France	Colleville, Caen	Met with President Emmanuel Macron. Attended the 75th anniversary of D-Day memorial ceremonies. Visited the Normandy American Cemetery and Memorial.
Donald Trump	August 24–26, 2019	France	Biarritz	Attended the 45th G7 summit.
Donald Trump	January 21–22, 2020	Switzerland	Davos	Attended the World Economic Forum.
Joe Biden	June 13–15, 2021	Belgium	Brussels	Attended the NATO summit.
Joe Biden	June 15–16, 2021	Switzerland	Geneva	Attended a summit meeting with Russian president Vladimir Putin. Also met with Swiss president Guy Parmelin.
Joe Biden	March 23–24, 2022	Belgium	Brussels	Attended the 2022 Brussels extraordinary NATO summit.
Joe Biden	June 25–28, 2022	Germany	Schloss Elmau	Attended the 48th G7 summit.
Joe Biden	June 5–9, 2024	France	Paris, Omaha Beach	State visit. Met with President Emmanuel Macron. Attended the 80th anniversary of D-Day memorial ceremonies. Visited the Normandy American Cemetery and Memorial, Omaha Beach and the Aisne-Marne American Cemetery.
Joe Biden	October 17–18, 2024	Germany	Berlin	Met with Chancellor Olaf Scholz, French president Emmanuel Maron, and British prime minister Keir Starmer.
Donald Trump	June 24–26, 2025	Netherlands	The Hague	Attended the NATO Summit Meeting.
Donald Trump	January 21–22, 2026	Switzerland	Davos	Attended the World Economic Forum.
Donald Trump	June 15–17, 2026	France	Evian-les-Bains	Attended the 52nd G7 summit.

=== Visits by former presidents ===
- Ulysses S. Grant visited France and the Netherlands in 1877, during a post-presidency world tour.
- Jimmy Carter, along with Carter Center personnel, met with the minister of foreign assistance in the Netherlands, and also with potential private corporate donors in The Hague, Netherlands, in September 1999, prior to visiting Bamako, Mali, for an assessment of the Center's health and agriculture programs in Africa.
- Bill Clinton visited the Netherlands in 2007 and 2011 for speaking engagements.

== See also ==
- Foreign policy of the United States
