= Brussels summit =

Brussels summit may refer to:

- 1974 Brussels summit
- 1975 Brussels summit
- 1985 Brussels summit
- 1988 Brussels summit
- December 1989 Brussels summit
- 1994 Brussels summit
- 2017 Brussels summit
- 2018 Brussels summit
- 2021 Brussels summit
- 2022 Brussels summit
