= List of international prime ministerial trips made by Margaret Thatcher =

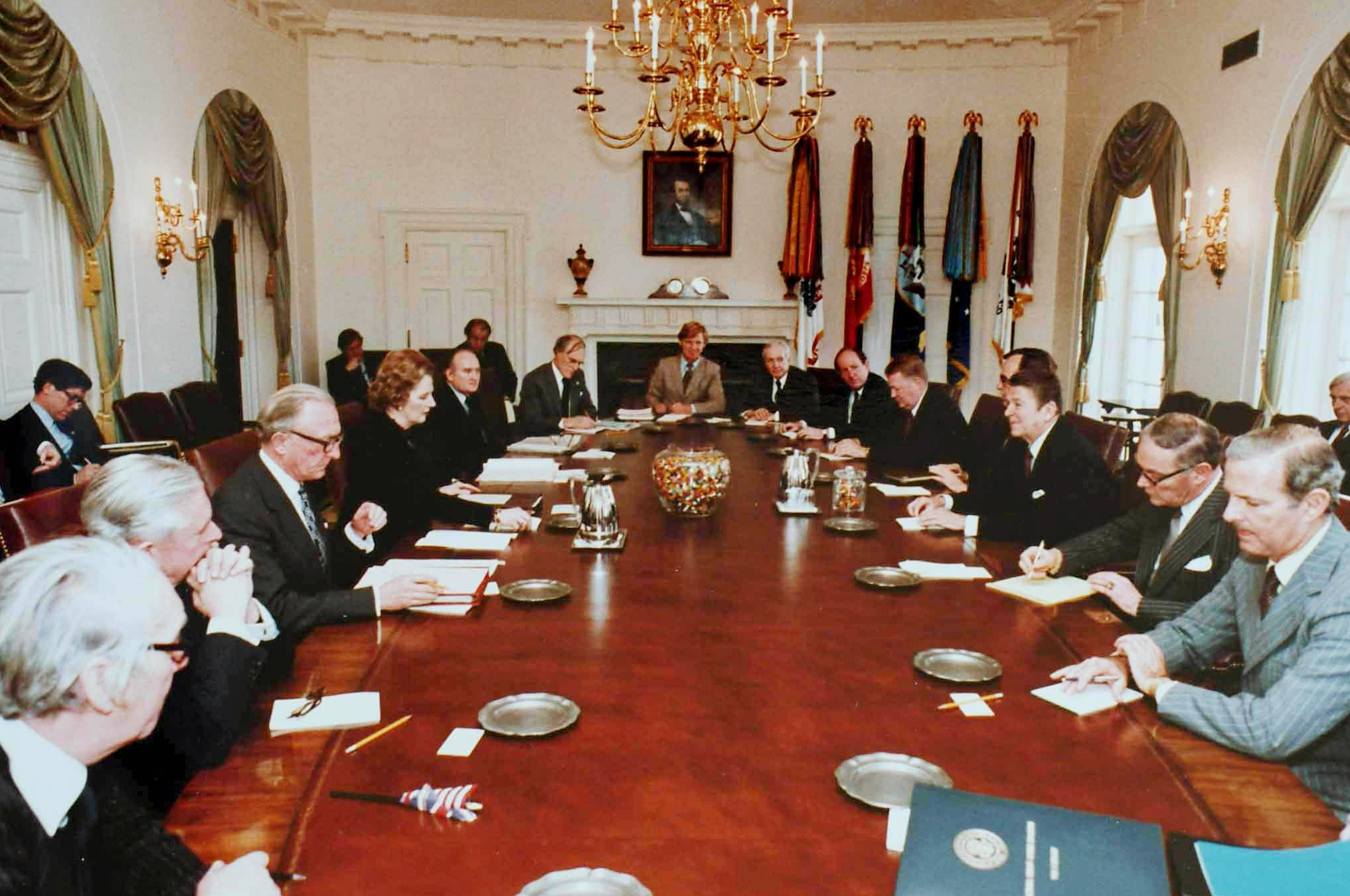
Thatcher in the White House Cabinet Room, 1981

The list of international prime ministerial trips made by Margaret Thatcher encompasses the diplomatic visits outside the United Kingdom made during her tenure as Prime Minister of the United Kingdom from 1979–1990.

== 1979 ==
Country	Locations visited	Date	Details	Image
France	Paris	June	Met with President Valéry Giscard d'Estaing.	
Soviet Union	Moscow	26 June	Working visit and stopover. Met with Chairman Alexei Kosygin.	
Japan	Tokyo	28–29 June	Attended the 5th G7 summit.	
Zambia	Lusaka	August	Attended the Commonwealth Heads of Government Meeting.	
United States	Washington, D.C., New York City	December	Met with President Jimmy Carter.	

== 1980 ==
Country	Locations visited	Date	Details	Image
Italy	Venice	22–23 June	Attended the 6th G7 summit.	

== 1981 ==
Country	Locations visited	Date	Details	Image
United States	Washington, D.C.	February	Met with President Ronald Reagan after his presidency begun.	
Saudi Arabia	Riyadh	April		
United Arab Emirates	Abu Dhabi	April		
Canada	Ottawa, Montebello	20–21 July	Attended the 7th G7 summit.	

== 1982 ==
Country	Locations visited	Date	Details	Image
United States	New York City	June	Addressed the United Nations Special Session on Disarmament.	
France	Versailles	4–6 June	Attended the 8th G7 summit.	
People's Republic of China	Beijing	September	Met with Chinese paramount leader Deng Xiaoping.	

== 1983 ==
Country	Locations visited	Date	Details	Image
United States	Williamsburg	28–29 May	Attended the 9th G7 summit.	

== 1984 ==
Country	Locations visited	Date	Details	Image
Hungarian People's Republic	Budapest	2–4 February	Official visit. Prime Minister Margaret Thatcher visited Hungary, in her first official visit to the Eastern Bloc. She met with Prime Minister György Lázár and First Secretary János Kádár. She also laid a wreath at Hősök tere and the Commonwealth War Cemetery in Solymár.	
Soviet Union	Moscow	14 February	Attended the state funeral of Yuri Andropov. Met briefly with Konstantin Chernenko.	
France	Fontainebleau	June	Attended a European Council Summit.	
People's Republic of China	Beijing	December	Official visit. Co-signed the historic Sino-British Joint Declaration alongside Chinese Premier Zhao Ziyang.	
United States	Camp David	December	Working visit.	

== 1985 ==
Country	Locations visited	Date	Details	Image
Soviet Union	Moscow	March	Attended the state funeral of Konstantin Chernenko.	
India	New Delhi	April	Met with Indian Prime Minister Rajiv Gandhi.	
Singapore	Singapore	April	Met with Prime Minister Lee Kuan Yew.	
Malaysia	Kuala Lumpur	April	Met with Prime Minister Mahathir Mohamad.	
West Germany	Bonn	2–4 May	Attended the 11th G7 summit.	

== 1986 ==
Country	Locations visited	Date	Details	Image
Japan	Tokyo	4–6 May	Attended the 12th G7 summit.	

== 1987 ==
Country	Locations visited	Date	Details	Image
Soviet Union	Moscow	March	Official visit.	
Italy	Venice	8–10 June	Attended the 13th G7 summit.	

== 1988 ==
Country	Locations visited	Date	Details	Image
Kenya	Nairobi	January	Met with President Daniel arap Moi.	
Nigeria	Lagos, Kano	January	Met with Ibrahim Babangida.	
Belgium	Brussels	1–3 March	Attended the NATO Summit Meeting.	
Canada	Toronto	19–20 June	Attended the 14th G7 summit.	
Singapore	Singapore	31 July - 1 August	Met with Prime Minister Lee Kuan Yew en-route to Australia.	
Australia	Melbourne, Sydney	August	Attended the Australian Bicentenary celebrations. Met with Prime Minister Bob Hawke.	
Spain	Madrid	September	The first official visit by a British Prime Minister to Spain.	
Belgium	Bruges	September	Delivered her famous Bruges speech.	
Poland	Warsaw, Gdańsk	November	Met with Communist leader Wojciech Jaruzelski and Solidarity leader Lech Wałęsa, providing direct, high-profile Western validation to the anti-communist opposition movement.	
United States	Washington, D.C.	November	Met with President Ronald Reagan before his presidency concluded.	

== 1989 ==
Country	Locations visited	Date	Details	Image
Belgium	Brussels	28–30 May	Attended the NATO Summit Meeting.	
France	Paris	14–16 July	Attended the 15th G7 summit.	
Belgium	Brussels	3–4 December	Attended the NATO Summit Meeting.	

== 1990 ==
Country	Locations visited	Date	Details	Image
Soviet Union	Moscow, Kyiv, Leninakan	8–10 June	Met with Mikhail Gorbachev and other leaders. Visited Supreme Soviet of Ukraine. Visited the Lord Byron School in the Armenian SSR.	
United States	Houston	9–11 July	Attended the 16th G7 summit.	
United States	Aspen	August	Attended the Aspen Institute Aspen Security Forum alongside President George H. W. Bush.	
France	Paris	18–21 November	Attended the CSCE summit to sign the Treaty on Conventional Armed Forces in Europe. While in Paris, she received the first-round results of the 1990 Conservative Party leadership election, forcing her resignation days later.	

== Multilateral meetings ==
Thatcher attended the following regular summits during her premiership:

Group	Year											
Group	1979	1980	1981	1982	1983	1984	1985	1986	1987	1988	1989	1990
G7	28–29 June, (Japan) Tokyo	22–23 June, (Italy) Venice	20–21 July, (Canada) Montebello	4–6 June, (France) Versailles	28–30 May, (United States) Williamsburg	7–9 June, (United Kingdom) London	2–4 May, (West Germany) Bonn	4–6 May, (Japan) Tokyo	8–10 June, (Italy) Venice	20–21 July, (Canada) Toronto	14–16 July, (France) Paris	9–11 July, (United States) Houston
NATO	none	none	none	10 June, (West Germany) Bonn	none	none	21 November, (Belgium) Brussels	none	none	2–3 March, (Belgium) Brussels	29–30 May, (Belgium) Brussels	5–6 July, (United Kingdom) London
NATO	none	none	none	10 June, (West Germany) Bonn	none	none	21 November, (Belgium) Brussels	none	none	2–3 March, (Belgium) Brussels	4 December, (Belgium) Brussels	5–6 July, (United Kingdom) London
CHOGM	1–7 August, (Zambia) Lusaka	none	30 September–7 October, (Australia) Melbourne	none	23–29 November, (India) New Delhi	none	16–22 October, (The Bahamas) Nassau	3–5 August, (United Kingdom) London	13–17 October, (Canada) Vancouver	none	18–24 October, (Malaysia) Kuala Lumpur	none

== See also ==
- Foreign relations of the United Kingdom
- List of international trips made by prime ministers of the United Kingdom
- List of state visits made by Elizabeth II
- Premiership of Margaret Thatcher
