= List of international presidential trips made by Ronald Reagan =

This is a list of international presidential trips made by Ronald Reagan, the 40th president of the United States. Reagan made 24 international trips to 26 different countries during his presidency, which began on January 20, 1981 and ended on January 20, 1989.

Reagan visited four continents: Europe, Asia, North America, and South America. He made seven trips to continental Europe, three to Asia and one to South America. He is perhaps best remembered for his speeches at the 40th anniversary of the Normandy landings, for his impassioned speech at the Berlin Wall, his summit meetings with Mikhail Gorbachev, and riding horses with Queen Elizabeth II at Windsor Park.

== Summary ==
The number of visits per country where President Reagan travelled are:

- One visit to Barbados, Brazil, China, Colombia, Costa Rica, Finland, Grenada, Honduras, Iceland, Indonesia, Ireland, Jamaica, Portugal, South Korea, Soviet Union, Spain, Switzerland
- Two visits to Belgium, Italy, Japan, Vatican City
- Three visits to United Kingdom and West Germany
- Four visits to France
- Five visits to Canada and Mexico

World map highlighting countries visited by Ronald Reagan while president.

== First term (1981–1985) ==
=== 1981 ===
	Country	Areas visited	Dates	Details	Image
1	Canada	Ottawa	March 10–11	State visit. Met with Governor General Edward Schreyer and Prime Minister Pierre Trudeau. Addressed parliament.	
2	Canada	Ottawa, Montebello	July 19–21	Attended the 7th G7 summit.	
3	Mexico	Cancun	October 21–24	Attended the North–South Summit on International Cooperation and Development. Met with the heads of state and government of Algeria, Bangladesh, Canada, China, France, Guyana, India, Japan, Mexico, Nigeria, the Philippines, Saudi Arabia, Sweden, Tanzania, the United Kingdom, Venezuela and Yugoslavia.	

=== 1982 ===
	Country	Areas visited	Dates	Details	Image
4	Jamaica	Kingston	April 7–8	Official visit. Met with Prime Minister Edward Seaga.	
4	Barbados	Bridgetown	April 8–11	Official visit. Met with the prime ministers of Barbados, Dominica, Antigua and Barbuda, St. Christopher and Nevis, and St. Vincent and the Grenadines.	
5	France	Paris	June 2–7	State visit. Met with President François Mitterrand and Prime Minister Pierre Mauroy.	
5	France	Versailles	June 5–6	Attended the 8th G7 summit.	
5	Italy	Rome	June 7	Met with President Sandro Pertini and Premier Giovanni Spadolini.	
5	Vatican City	Apostolic Palace	June 7	Audience with Pope John Paul II.	
5	United Kingdom	London, Windsor Castle	June 7–9	State visit. Met with Queen Elizabeth II and Prime Minister Margaret Thatcher. Addressed Parliament.	
5	West Germany	Bonn	June 9–11	State visit. Met with Chancellor Helmut Schmidt and President Karl Carstens. Addressed the Bundestag and attended a meeting of the North Atlantic Council.	
5	West Germany	West Berlin	June 11	Met with Chancellor Helmut Schmidt.	
6	Mexico	Tijuana	October 8	Exchange of visits with President-elect Miguel de la Madrid.	
7	Brazil	Brasília, São Paulo	November 30 – December 3	Official working visit. Met with President João Figueiredo.	
7	Colombia	Bogota	December 3	Official working visit. Met with President Belisario Betancur.	
7	Costa Rica	San José	December 3–4	Official working visit. Met with President Luis Alberto Monge and President Álvaro Magaña of El Salvador.	
7	Honduras	San Pedro Sula	December 4	Official working visit. Met with President Roberto Suazo Córdova and with Guatemalan President Efraín Ríos Montt.	

=== 1983 ===
	Country	Areas visited	Dates	Details	Image
8	Mexico	La Paz	August 14	Informal meeting with President Miguel de la Madrid.	
9	Japan	Tokyo	November 9–12	State visit. Met with Emperor Hirohito and Prime Minister Yasuhiro Nakasone and addressed the Diet.	
9	South Korea	Seoul, Demilitarized Zone	November 12–14	State visit. Met with President Chun Doo-hwan. Addressed the National Assembly and visited U.S. troops.	

=== 1984 ===
	Country	Areas visited	Dates	Details	Image
10	China	Beijing, Xi'an, Shanghai	April 26 – May 1	State visit. Met with President Li Xiannian and Premier Zhao Ziyang.	
11	Ireland	Shannon, Galway, Ballyporeen, Dublin	June 1–4	Met with President Patrick Hillery and Taoiseach Garret FitzGerald. Visited ancestral home. Addressed Parliament.	
11	United Kingdom	London	June 4–10	Attended the 10th G7 summit.	
11	France	Normandy	June 6	Attended commemorative ceremonies of the 40th anniversary of the Allied landing in Normandy. Also present were Canadian prime minister Pierre Trudeau, Queen Beatrix of the Netherlands, King Olav V of Norway, King Baudouin I of Belgium, French president François Mitterrand, Queen Elizabeth II and Jean, Grand Duke of Luxembourg.	

== Second term (1985–1989) ==
=== 1985 ===
	Country	Areas visited	Dates	Details	Image
12	Canada	Quebec City	March 17–18	Met with Prime Minister Brian Mulroney.	
13	West Germany	Bonn	April 30 – May 4	Attended the 11th G7 summit.	
13	West Germany	Bonn, Bergen-Belsen, Bitburg, Hambach Castle	May 5–6	State visit. Attended ceremonies commemorating 40th anniversary of the end of World War II in Europe. Reagan's brief visit to the Kolmeshöhe Military Cemetery in Bitburg was the subject of the Bitburg controversy.	
13	Spain	Madrid	May 6–8	State visit. Met with King Juan Carlos I and President Felipe González.	
13	France	Strasbourg	May 8	Addressed the European Parliament.	
13	Portugal	Lisbon	May 8–10	State visit. Met with President António Ramalho Eanes and Prime Minister Mário Soares. Addressed the National Assembly.	
14	Switzerland	Geneva	November 16–21	Attended the Summit Meeting with Soviet general secretary Mikhail Gorbachev. Met also with Swiss president Kurt Furgler.	
14	Belgium	Brussels	November 21	Attended the NATO Summit Meeting. Present were the Heads of State and Government of Belgium, Canada, Denmark, Federal Republic of Germany, Italy, the Netherlands, Norway, Luxembourg, Portugal, Turkey and the United Kingdom.	

=== 1986 ===
	Country	Areas visited	Dates	Details	Image
15	Mexico	Mexicali	January 3	Informal meeting with President Miguel de la Madrid.	
16	Grenada	St. George's	February 20	Met with Governor General Paul Scoon and Prime Minister Herbert Blaize, and with the Prime Ministers of Barbados, Dominica, Jamaica, St. Lucia, St. Christopher and Nevis, St. Vincent and the Grenadines, Antigua and Barbuda, and Trinidad and Tobago. Dedicated a memorial to U.S. servicemen.	
17	Indonesia	Bali	April 29 – May 2	Attended the ASEAN Ministerial Meeting. Met with Indonesian president Suharto and Philippine vice president Salvador Laurel.	
17	Japan	Tokyo	May 2–7	Attended the 12th G7 summit.	
18	Iceland	Reykjavík	October 11–12	Pre-Summit Meeting with Soviet general secretary Mikhail Gorbachev. Met with President Vigdís Finnbogadóttir.	

=== 1987 ===
	Country	Areas visited	Dates	Details	Image
19	Canada	Ottawa	April 4–5	State visit. Met with Governor General Jeanne Sauvé and Prime Minister Brian Mulroney. Addressed parliament.	
20	Italy	Venice, Rome	June 3–11	Attended the 13th G7 summit. Met with President Francesco Cossiga and Prime Minister Amintore Fanfani in Rome.	
20	Vatican City	Apostolic Palace	June 6	Audience with Pope John Paul II.	
20	West Germany	West Berlin, Bonn	June 11–12	Attended celebrations commemorating the 750th anniversary of the founding of Berlin. Met with Chancellor Helmut Kohl. Delivered the "Tear down this wall!" speech in front of the Brandenburg Gate.	

=== 1988 ===
	Country	Areas visited	Dates	Details	Image
21	Mexico	Mazatlan	February 13	Informal meeting with President Miguel de la Madrid. Signed textile agreement.	
22	Belgium	Brussels	March 1–3	Attended the NATO Summit Meeting. Present were the Heads of State and Government of Canada, Denmark, France, Federal Republic of Germany, Greece, Iceland, Italy, Luxembourg, Norway, Portugal, Spain, Turkey and the United Kingdom.	
23	Finland	Helsinki	May 25	Met with President Mauno Koivisto and Prime Minister Harri Holkeri.	
23	Soviet Union	Moscow	May 29 – June 2	Summit meeting with General Secretary Mikhail Gorbachev. Exchanged ratifications of the INF Treaty.	
23	United Kingdom	London	June 2–3	Met with Queen Elizabeth II, Prime Minister Margaret Thatcher and Japanese prime minister Noboru Takeshita.	
24	Canada	Toronto	June 19–21	Attended the 14th G7 summit.	

== Multilateral meetings ==
Multilateral meetings of the following intergovernmental organizations took place during Ronald Reagan's presidency (1981–1989).

Group	Year							
Group	1981	1982	1983	1984	1985	1986	1987	1988
G7	July 20–21 (Canada) Montebello	June 4–6 (France) Versailles	May 28–30 (United States) Williamsburg	June 7–9 (United Kingdom) London	May 2–4 (West Germany) Bonn	May 4–6 (Japan) Tokyo	June 8–10 (Italy) Venice	July 20–21 (Canada) Toronto
NATO	none	June 10 (West Germany) Bonn	none	none	November 21 (Belgium) Brussels	none	none	March 2–3 (Belgium) Brussels

== See also ==
- Foreign policy of the Reagan administration
- Foreign policy of the United States
