= List of presidential trips made by Ronald Reagan (1988–89) =

This is a list of presidential trips made by Ronald Reagan during 1988–1989, the eighth and final year of his presidency as the 40th president of the United States. International trips are highlighted in blue.

This list excludes trips made within Washington, D.C., the U.S. federal capital in which the White House, the official residence and principal workplace of the president, is located. It also excludes the capital's immediate surroundings in Maryland and Virginia, such as Andrews Air Force Base in Maryland, where the president typically boards Air Force One for all trips outside the area. Also excluded are trips to Camp David, the country residence of the president, and to Reagan's Rancho del Cielo ranch in Santa Barbara County, California.

== January 1988 ==
State or country	Areas visited	Dates	Details
California	Palm Springs	January 1–3	Attended the opening of the Bob Hope Cultural Center. Stayed at Sunnylands.

== February ==
State or country	Areas visited	Dates	Details
North Carolina	Durham	February 8	Attended a seminar, "Substance Abuse in the Workplace – Strategies for the 1990s", at Duke University's Cameron Indoor Stadium.
California	Los Angeles	February 12	Attended a Republican reception at the home of David H. Murdock in Bel Air. Stayed at the Century Plaza Hotel.
Mexico	Mazatlan	February 13	Informal meeting with President Miguel de la Madrid. Signed textile agreement.

== March ==
State or country	Areas visited	Dates	Details
Belgium	Brussels	March 1–3	Attended the 1988 Brussels NATO summit. Present were the Heads of State and Government of Canada, Denmark, France, Federal Republic of Germany, Greece, Iceland, Italy, Luxembourg, Norway, Portugal, Spain, Turkey and the United Kingdom.
Indiana	South Bend	March 9	Unveiled a commemorative stamp depicting Knute Rockne at the University of Notre Dame. Reagan had starred in the 1940 film about him, Knute Rockne, All American.
Virginia	Richmond	March 28	Visited Reynolds Metals Company International Headquarters.

== April ==
State or country	Areas visited	Dates	Details
California	Coto de Caza	April 4	Attended a Ronald Reagan Presidential Foundation luncheon at the home of General William Lyon.
Nevada	Las Vegas	April 10	Addressed the National Association of Broadcasters convention at the Las Vegas Hilton.
Massachusetts	Springfield	April 21	Remarks to the World Affairs Council of Western Massachusetts at the Springfield Civic Center.

== May ==
State or country	Areas visited	Dates	Details
Illinois	Chicago	May 4	Addressed the National Strategy Forum at the Palmer House Hotel.
Connecticut	New London	May 18	Gave the commencement address at the United States Coast Guard Academy.
Finland	Helsinki	May 25	Met with President Mauno Koivisto and Prime Minister Harri Holkeri.
Soviet Union	Moscow	May 29–June 2	Attended the Moscow Summit with General Secretary Mikhail Gorbachev. Exchanged ratifications of the Intermediate-Range Nuclear Forces Treaty.

== June ==
State or country	Areas visited	Dates	Details
United Kingdom	London	June 2–3	Met with Queen Elizabeth II, Prime Minister Margaret Thatcher, and Japanese prime minister Noboru Takeshita.
Canada	Toronto	June 19–21	Attended the 14th G7 summit.
Florida	Miami	June 29	Campaigned for Representative Connie Mack at the Omni International Hotel.

== July ==
State or country	Areas visited	Dates	Details
Illinois	Du Quoin	July 14	Toured a farm affected by the 1988 Midwestern drought. Visited the Du Quoin State Fairgrounds.
Iowa	Davenport	July 14	Dedicated a new facility for WOC radio, where Reagan got his first broadcasting job in 1932. Attended the Quad-Cities Chamber of Commerce luncheon at the Palmer College of Chiropractic auditorium.

== August ==
State or country	Areas visited	Dates	Details
Ohio	Cincinnati	August 8	Visited a local business, United States Precision Lens, Inc. Addressed the National Governors Association at the Albert B. Sabin Cincinnati Convention Center.
Louisiana	New Orleans	August 14–16	Attended the 1988 Republican National Convention, where his vice president George H. W. Bush was nominated as the party's presidential candidate. Addressed the convention at the New Orleans Convention Center and the Louisiana Superdome. Stayed at The Westin New Orleans Canal Place. Addressed a Fraternal Order of Eagles breakfast at the Hilton New Orleans Riverside.
California	Long Beach, Irvine, Los Angeles, Santa Barbara	August 23–27	Signed the Omnibus Trade and Competitiveness Act at the Port of Long Beach. Campaigned for Senator Pete Wilson at the Irvine Hilton. Stayed at the Century Plaza Hotel. Campaigned for George Bush at the home of Betsy Bloomingdale. Campaigned for Representative Robert Lagomarsino at a private residence in Santa Barbara.

== September ==
State or country	Areas visited	Dates	Details
Nebraska	Hastings	September 6	Dedicated the Garold C.J. and Marie Gray Center for the Communications Arts at Hastings College.
Kentucky	Louisville	September 6	Addressed the American Legion convention at the Commonwealth Convention Center.
Missouri	Cape Girardeau, St. Louis	September 14	Spoke at campaign rallies at the Show Me Center and the Omni International Hotel in St. Louis.
Texas	Waco, Houston	September 22	Spoke at Baylor University's Ferrell Center. Campaigned for Representative Beau Boulter at the Waco Convention Center. Visited the Johnson Space Center. Attended a Republican fundraiser at the George R. Brown Convention Center.
Florida	Boca Raton	September 22–23	Stayed at the Boca Raton Hotel, where he attended a Republican fundraising brunch.
New York	New York	September 26–27	Addressed the opening session of the 43rd United Nations General Assembly. Stayed at the Waldorf Astoria New York.
Illinois	Chicago	September 30	Addressed local ethnic community leaders at Wozniak's Casino. Threw out the ceremonial first pitch in a surprise appearance at Wrigley Field, then gave play-by-play broadcast commentary for the first 1 1/2 innings of the Chicago Cubs–Pittsburgh Pirates game. Visited the Palmer House Hotel. Attended a Republican fundraiser at the Chicago Mercantile Exchange.

== October ==
State or country	Areas visited	Dates	Details
Michigan	Sterling Heights, Detroit	October 7	Spoke at Adlai E. Stevenson High School. Attended a Macomb County Area Chambers of Commerce luncheon at Penna's of Sterling Banquet Hall. Attended a Republican fundraiser at the Westin Renaissance Center.
Pennsylvania	Upper Darby	October 12	Spoke at Upper Darby High School. Remarks to Area High School Students and Faculty
New Jersey	Newark, West Orange	October 12	Visited the Newark Airport Marriott. Attended a Columbus Day dinner at South Mountain Arena.
Ohio	Columbus, Bowling Green, Cincinnati	October 19	Spoke at Ohio State University's St. John Arena and the Wood County Courthouse and Jail. Campaigned for Cleveland mayor George Voinovich for Senate at the Clarion Hotel.
North Carolina	Raleigh	October 21	Spoke at the Raleigh Civic Center.
Kentucky	Bowling Green	October 21	Spoke at Western Kentucky University's E. A. Diddle Arena.
Maryland	Baltimore	October 26	Campaigned for Alan Keyes for Senate at the Hyatt Regency hotel.
Arkansas	Little Rock	October 27	Spoke at Adams Field.
Missouri	Springfield	October 27	Spoke at Springfield Regional Airport.
California	San Diego, Beverly Hills, Los Angeles, Fullerton, San Bernardino	October 27–November 1	Spoke at San Diego International Airport. Stayed at The Beverly Hilton, where he signed the Berne Convention Implementation Act of 1988. Addressed the Los Angeles World Affairs Council. Received an award from the Simon Wiesenthal Center at the Century Plaza Hotel. Spoke at California State University, Fullerton and the National Orange Show grounds.

== November ==
State or country	Areas visited	Dates	Details
Nevada	Reno	November 1	Campaigned for Senator Chic Hecht at Cannon International Airport.
Wisconsin	Milwaukee	November 2	Stayed at the Hyatt Regency Milwaukee, where he campaigned for Susan Engeleiter for Senate.
Ohio	Berea	November 2	Spoke at Baldwin–Wallace College.
Illinois	Chicago, Palos Hills	November 4	Signed the Genocide Convention Implementation Act at the O'Hare International Airport Air Force Reserve Building. Spoke at Moraine Valley Community College.
New Jersey	Voorhees	November 4	Spoke at the Main Street Complex.
Michigan	Mount Clemens	November 5	Spoke at Macomb Community College.
Texas	Mesquite	November 5	Spoke at the Mesquite Rodeo Center.
California	Long Beach, San Diego	November 7	Spoke at the RMS Queen Mary and the San Diego Convention Center.
California	Simi Valley	November 21	Attended the groundbreaking ceremony for the Ronald Reagan Presidential Library.

== December ==
State or country	Areas visited	Dates	Details
New York	New York	December 7	Met with Soviet president Mikhail Gorbachev in the Governors Island Summit.
Virginia	Charlottesville	December 16	Spoke at the University of Virginia's Cabell Hall.
California	Los Angeles, Palm Springs	December 23–January 5	Began moving into his post-presidential home, 668 St. Cloud Road. Visited Fox Plaza, which became the location of Reagan's post-presidential office, and Chasen's. Stayed at Sunnylands. Addressed the Nancy Reagan Drug Abuse Center Benefit Dinner at The Beverly Hilton.

== January 1989 ==
State or country	Areas visited	Dates	Details
New York	New York	January 13	Received the Order pro Merito Melitensi of the Sovereign Military Order of Malta at the Waldorf Astoria.
