= Bruges Group =

Think tank

The Bruges Group
- Type: Political and economic think tank
- Established: 1989
- Founder: Patrick Robertson
- Affiliations: Independent
- Chairman: Barry Legg
- Director: Robert Oulds
- Location: 246 Linen Hall, 162–168 Regent Street, London, W1B 5TB, United Kingdom
- Website: brugesgroup.com

The Bruges Group is a think tank based in the United Kingdom. Founded in 1989, it advocates for a restructuring of Britain's relationship with the European Union and other European countries. Its members and staff campaign against the notion of an "ever-closer union" in Europe and, above all, against British involvement in a single European state. The group is often associated with the Conservative Party, including MPs such as Iain Duncan Smith, Daniel Hannan, John Redwood, and Norman Lamont. However, it is formally an independent all-party think tank, and some Labour MPs and peers have cited the publications or attended the meetings of the Bruges Group through the years, such as Frank Field, Gisela Stuart, Lord Stoddart of Swindon and Lord Shore of Stepney.

The Bruges Group's honorary president was former Prime Minister Margaret Thatcher. Norman Tebbit was president of the group until his death in July 2025. The current chairman is Barry Legg, who was chief executive of the Conservative Party and a former Member of Parliament.

The stated mission of the Bruges Group is: 'to promote discussion on the European Union and to advance the education of the public on European affairs. The Bruges Group's research also explores alternative international relationships and policies'.

== Background ==
=== Founding ===
Founded in February 1989, the Bruges Group's original aim was to promote the idea of a less centralised European structure than what they felt was emerging in Brussels. It was established by Lord Harris of High Cross and Oxford University student Patrick Robertson in response to Margaret Thatcher's Bruges speech to the College of Europe in September 1988, during which she remarked that:

I want to see us work more closely on the things we can do better together than alone. Europe is stronger when we do so, whether it be in trade, in defence or in our relations with the rest of the world. But working more closely together does not require power to be centralised in Brussels or decisions to be taken by an appointed bureaucracy. … We have not successfully rolled back the frontiers of the state in Britain, only to see them re-imposed at a European level with a European super-state exercising a new dominance from Brussels.

Thatcher had cooperated with European Commission president Jacques Delors and supported the Single European Act, but in 1988 became Eurosceptic after realizing that a single market would cause political integration. Research institutes such as the Bruges Group quickly began to focus on Eurosceptic opinions in Britain and opposition to Delors. The Group is considered to be the common ancestor of the many British eurosceptic parties and groups that emerged in the 1990s. Since then, the Group has expanded its research agenda to include alternative international relationships for the United Kingdom and a complete restructuring of Britain's relationship with other European countries. Since its founding, it has been at the forefront of policy debates, supported by British MPs as well as Members of the European Parliament.

The group was a rallying point for rebellious backbench Conservative MPs during House of Commons debates over the Maastricht Treaty in 1992.

Lord Ralph Harris, who had been general director of the Institute of Economic Affairs 1957 to 1988, was chairman from 1989 until 1991 when he was replaced by professor Kenneth Minogue.

=== 1993–present ===
In 1993, Dr Martin Holmes (University of Oxford) and Dr Brian Hindley (London School of Economics) became co-chairmen of the Bruges Group. Jonathan Collett became campaign director in 1993 and held the role until 2001. During that time, the Bruges Group became the most influential eurosceptic group, holding regular meetings and regularly publishing working papers. The Rt. Hon. Lord Lamont of Lerwick, Chancellor of the Exchequer 1990–1993, remarked that the Bruges Group maintains 'a vital influence on the European debate and I hope others will support it enthusiastically.' The Rt. Hon. John Redwood MP also remarked that the Bruges Group 'has set out many important points in the debate about the way Europe is careering towards a superstate and the way in which Britain needs a different and better relationship with our European partners.'

Its first annual conference was held in 1994 at King's College and has been held there ever since. The Bruges Group played a leading role in stopping the United Kingdom from entering the Eurozone. Martin Holmes' publication of The Conservative Party and Europe had a strong influence on William Hague. Since then, the annual conference has been held in London and has greatly impacted intellectual debates over Britain's membership in the European Union.

Dr Martin Holmes continued as co-chairman until 2001. Dr Brian Hindley carried on as co-chairman for a few more years and published a number of papers for the Bruges Group.

Another pivotal moment for the Bruges Group came in 2008 at the twentieth anniversary dinner in London. There, Margaret Thatcher and other notable MPs, such as the Sir Peter Tapsell MP, Father of the House of Commons; the Owen Paterson MP, Secretary of State for the Environment; the Theresa Villiers MP, Secretary of State for Northern Ireland; and the John Redwood MP, held talks over Britain's relationship with the EU. From that point onwards, the Bruges Group heavily influenced the policies of the Conservative Party.

In 2013, then-leader of the UK Independence Party (UKIP) Nigel Farage planned to address a Tory party conference in Manchester that was organized by the Bruges Group.

In 2021, the DUP's former Deputy Leader Nigel Dodds, Sir Bernard Jenkin MP, and James Webber of Shearman & Sterling, addressed the Bruges Group in a Waterloo Day webinar on 'The Future of the Union', on the issues of the Northern Ireland Protocol and how the Johnson government should renegotiate on the status of Northern Ireland.

=== Supporters ===
The Bruges Group works closely with politicians mainly in the Conservative Party, but has also attracted others from the Labour Party and UKIP. The group has also established an Academic Advisory Council which has included Professors Tim Congdon (University of Oxford), Julius Gould (University of Nottingham), Kenneth Minogue (London School of Economics), Christie Davies (University of Reading), Ben Roberts (London School of Economics), Norman Stone (Bilkent University), and Patrick Minford (Cardiff Business School). Its sponsors, patrons, and supporters include:

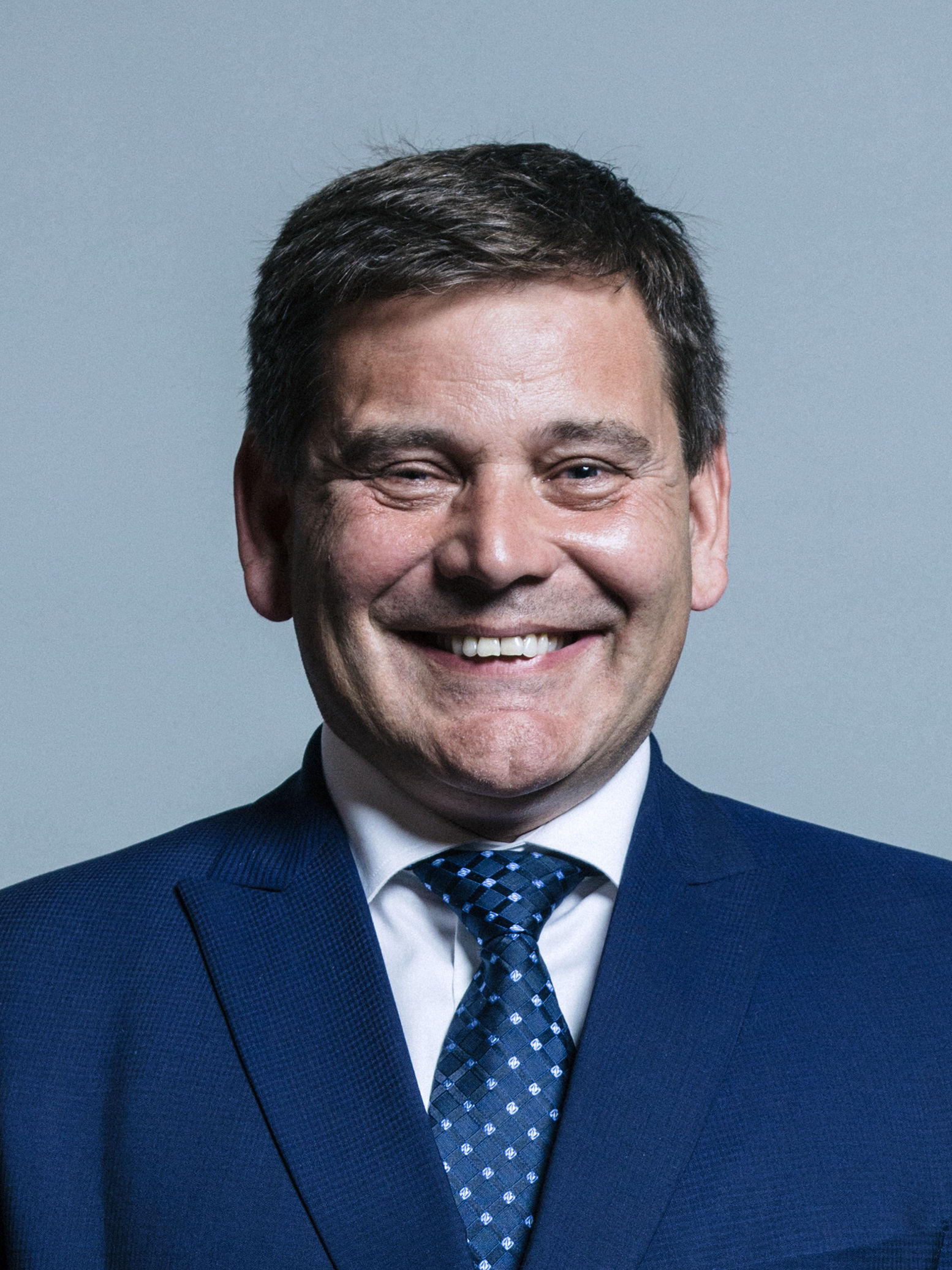
Andrew Bridgen MP

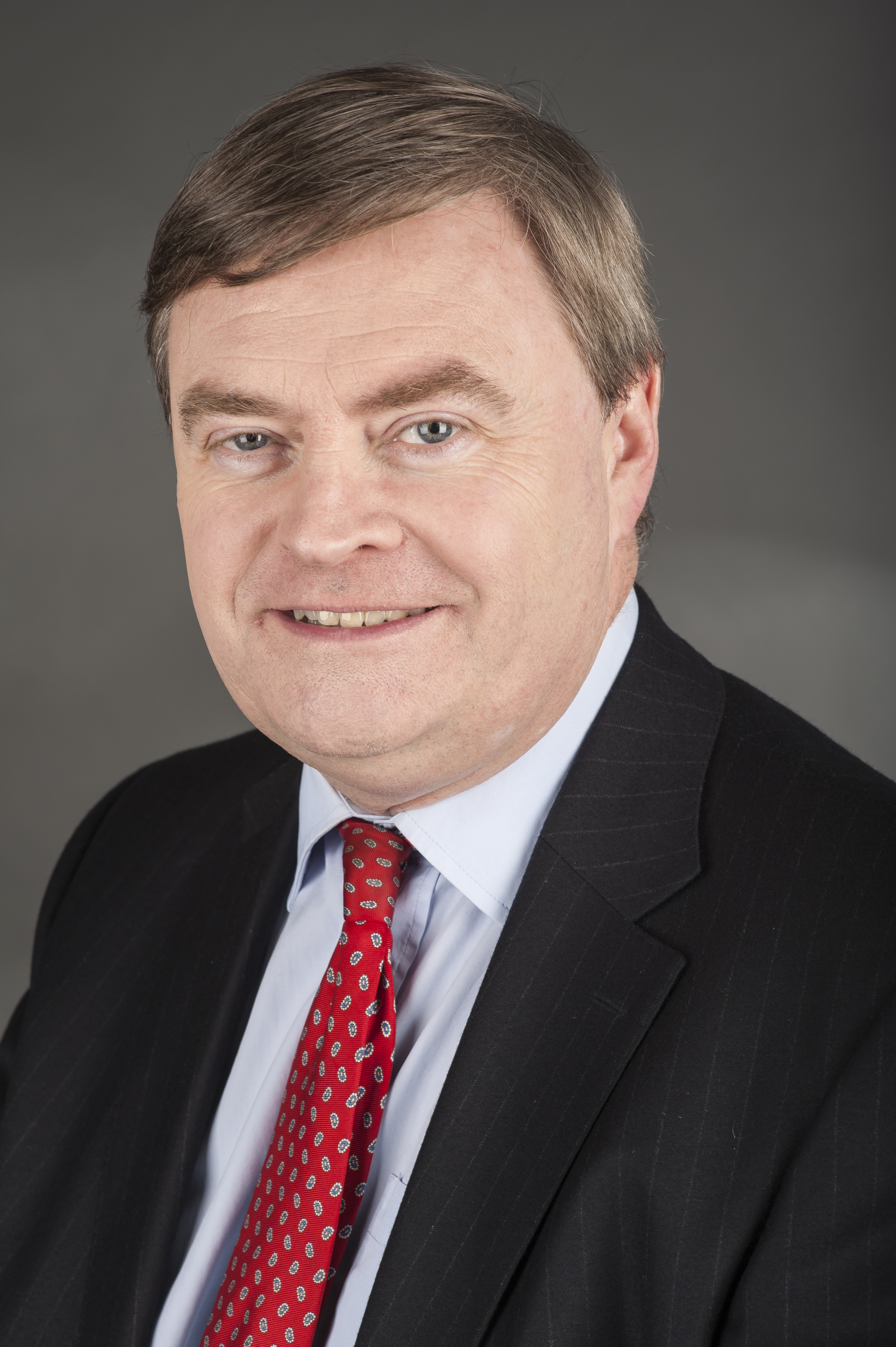
David Campbell Bannerman

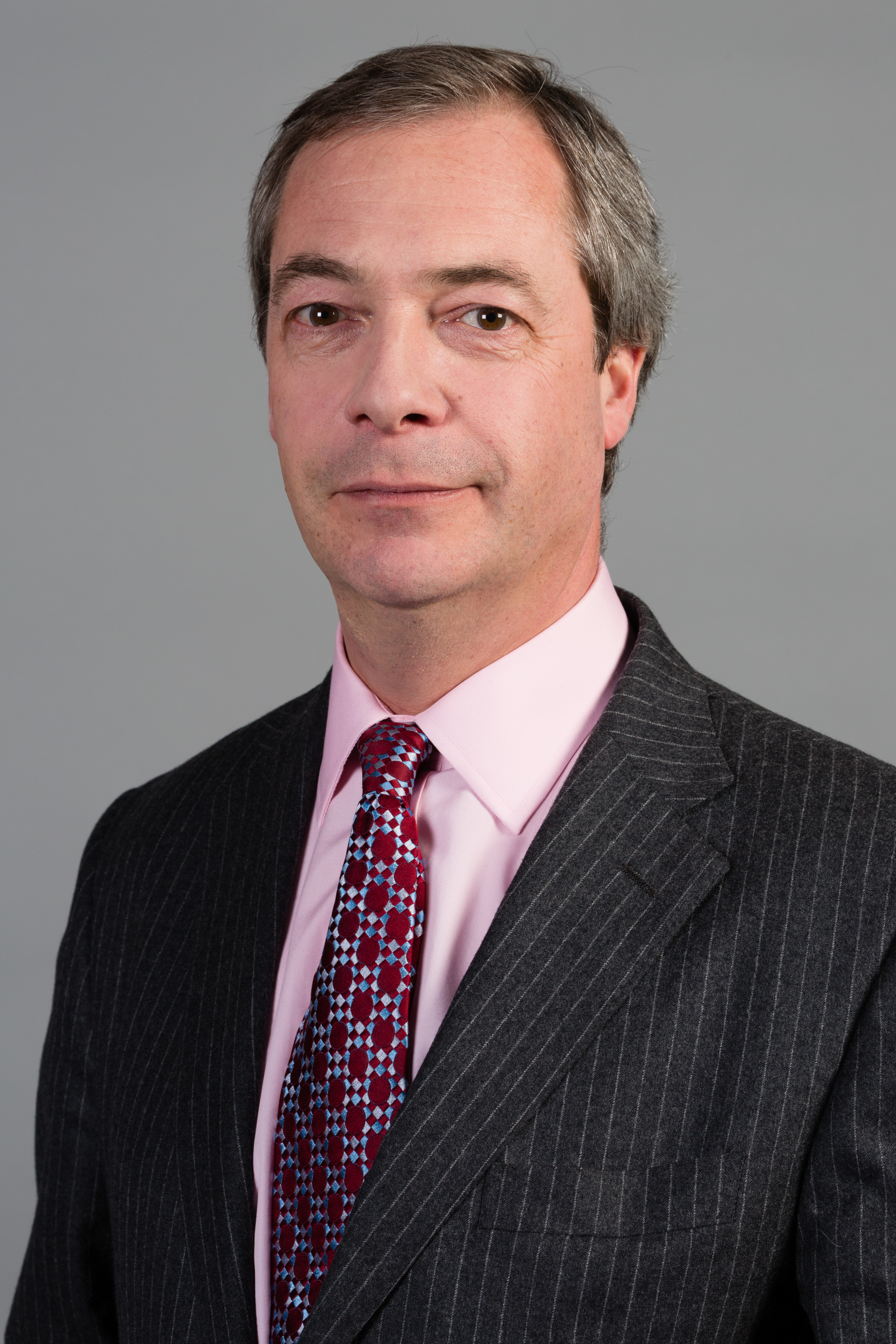
Nigel Farage

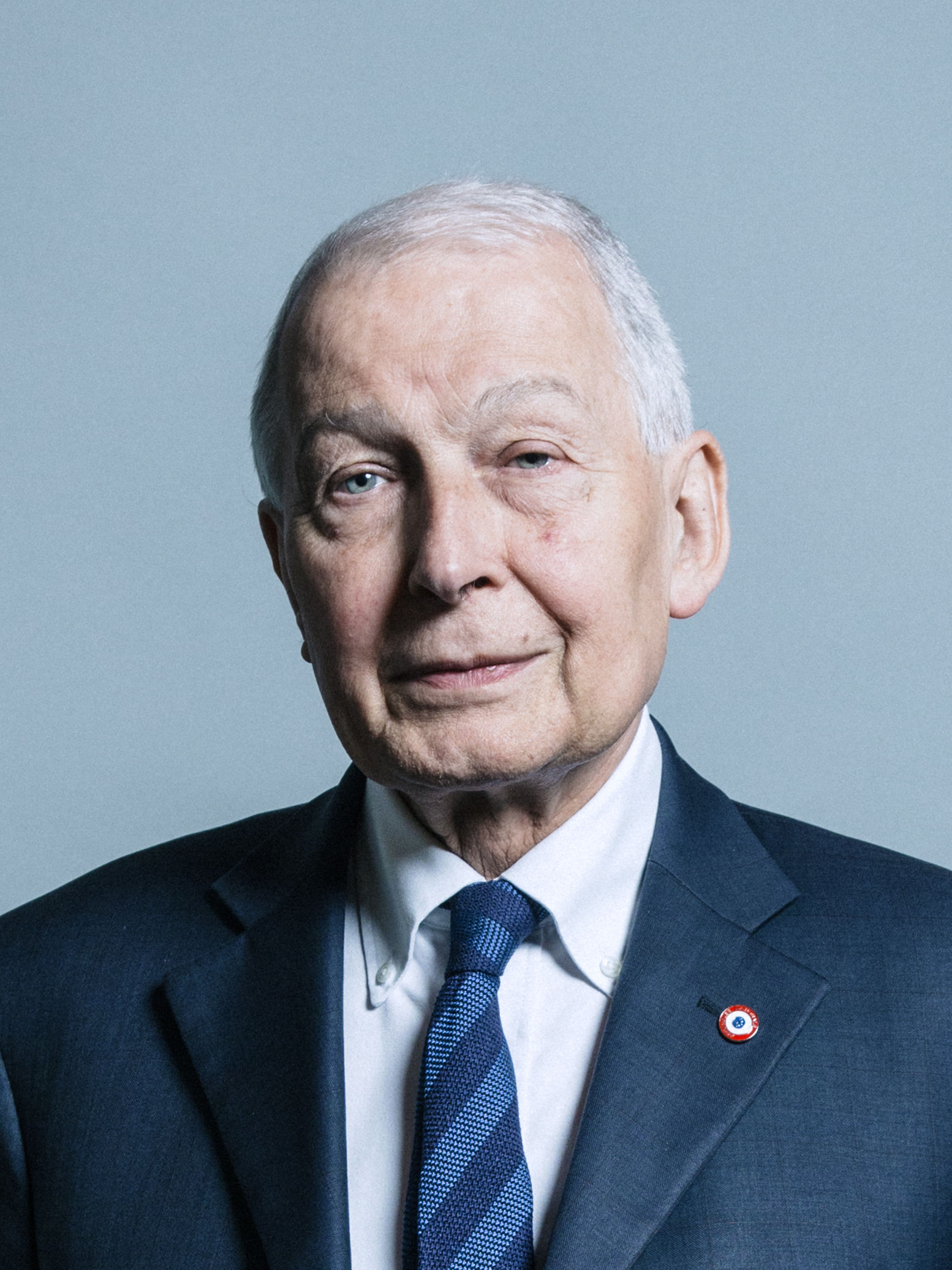
Frank Field, Baron Field of Birkenhead

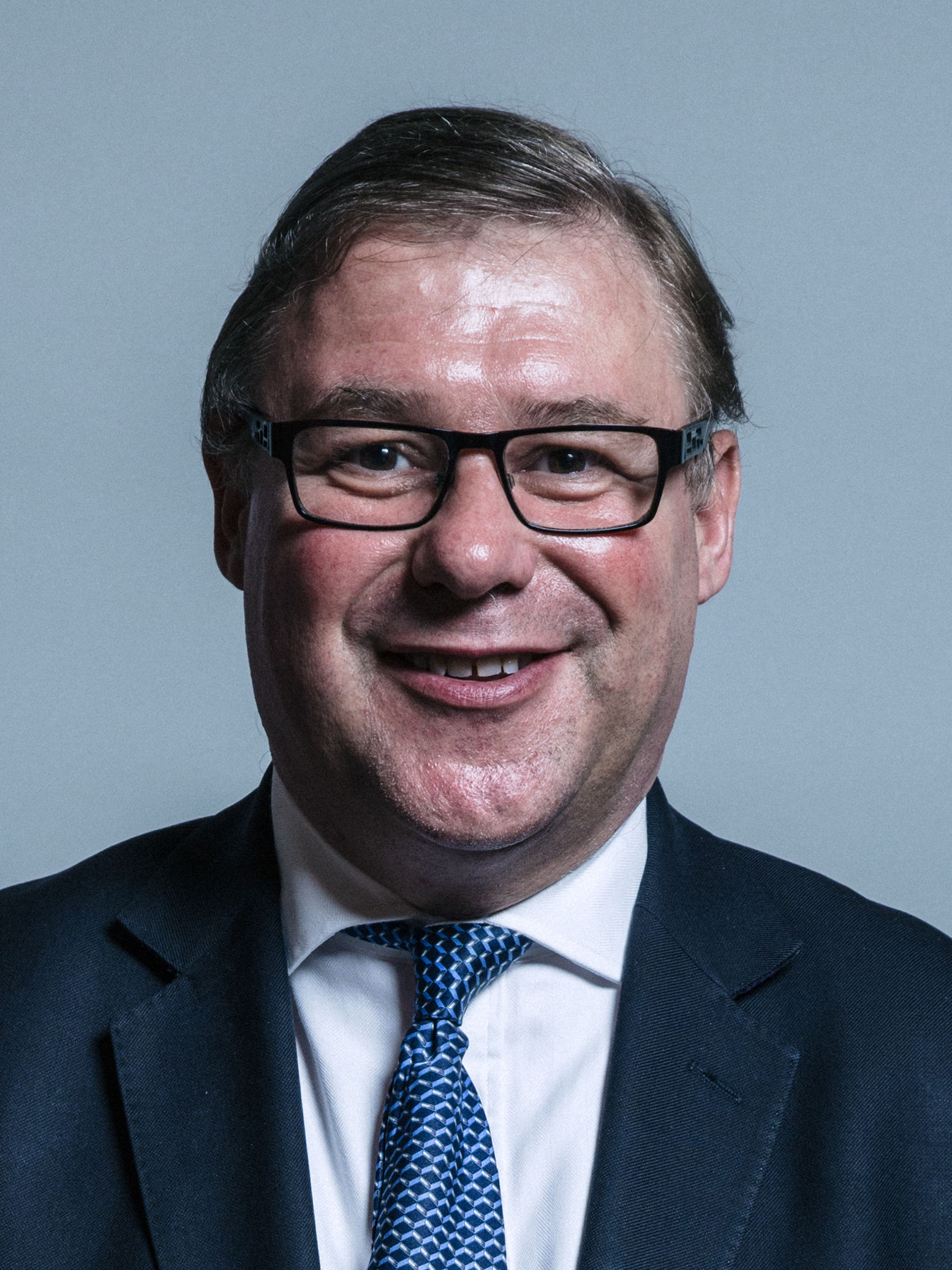
Mark Francois MP

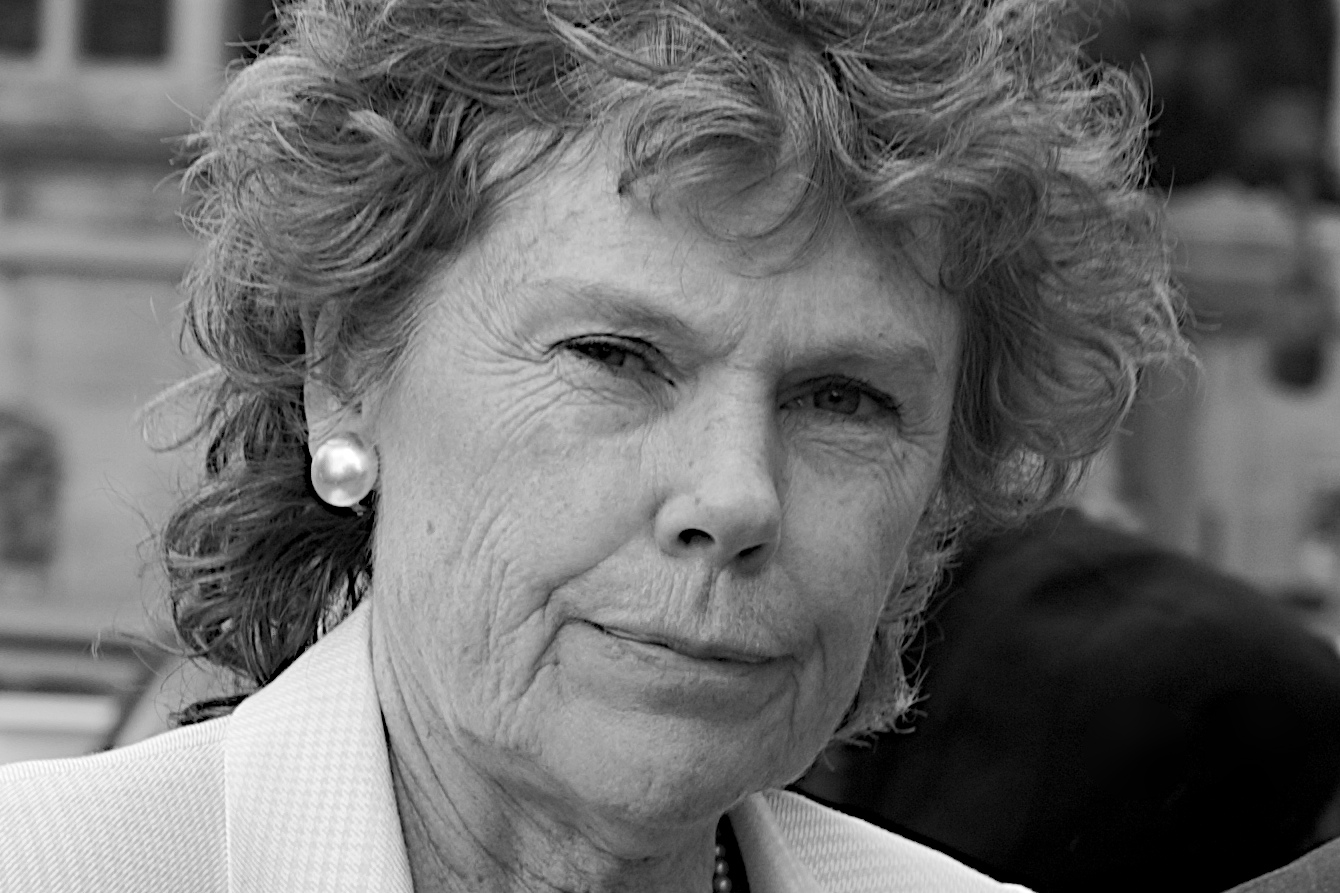
Baroness Hoey

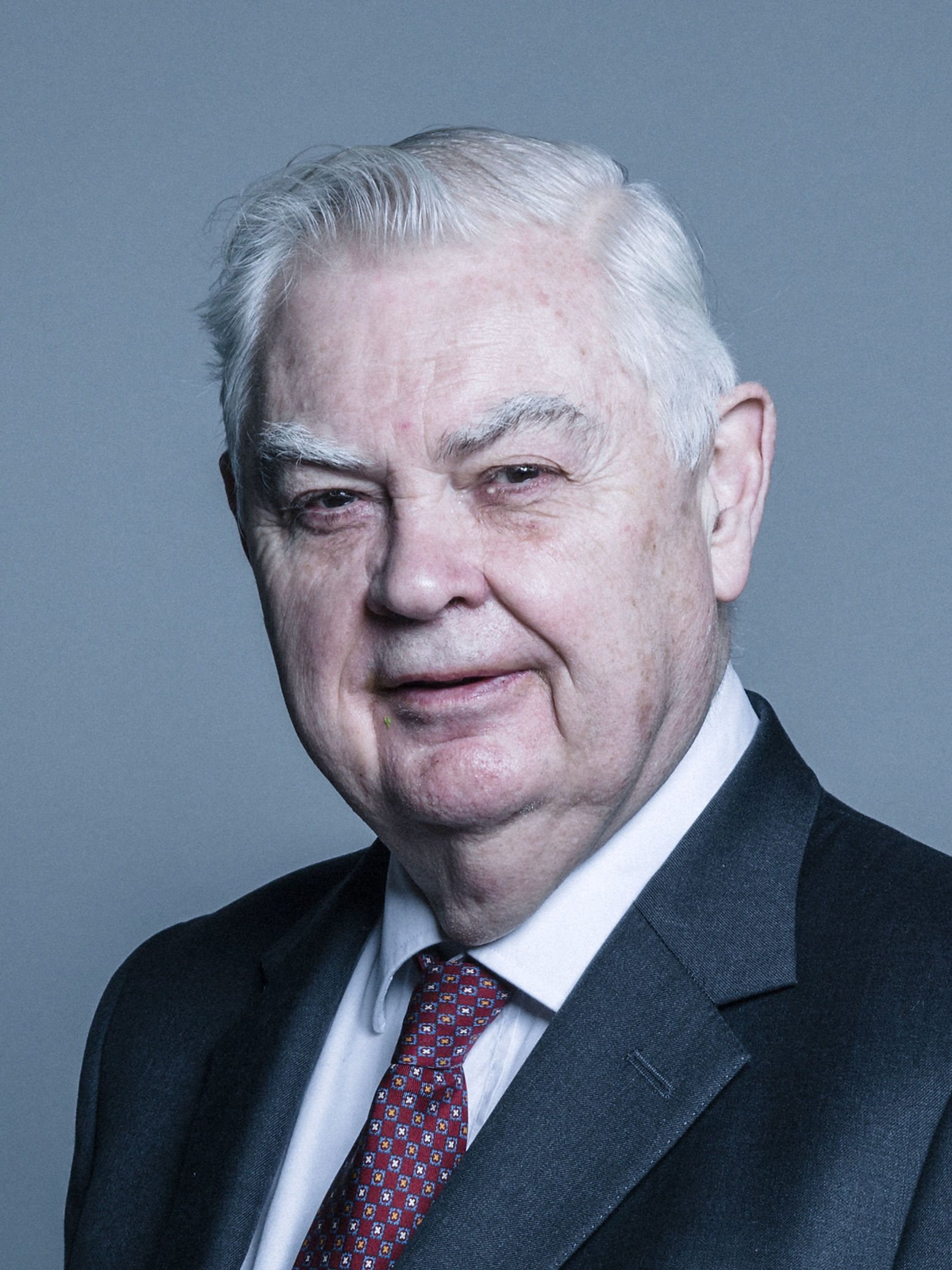
Lord Lamont of Lerwick

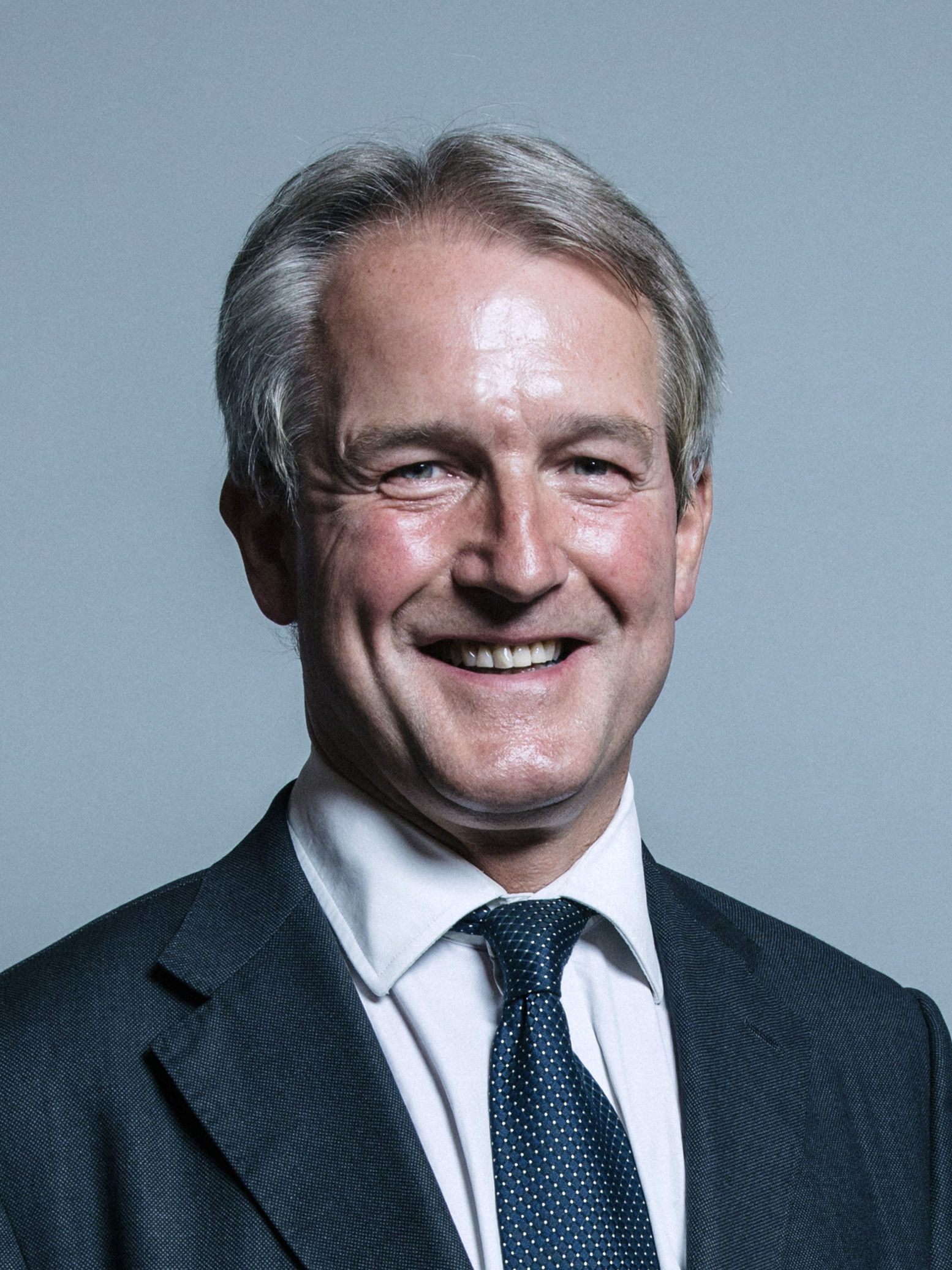
Owen Paterson MP

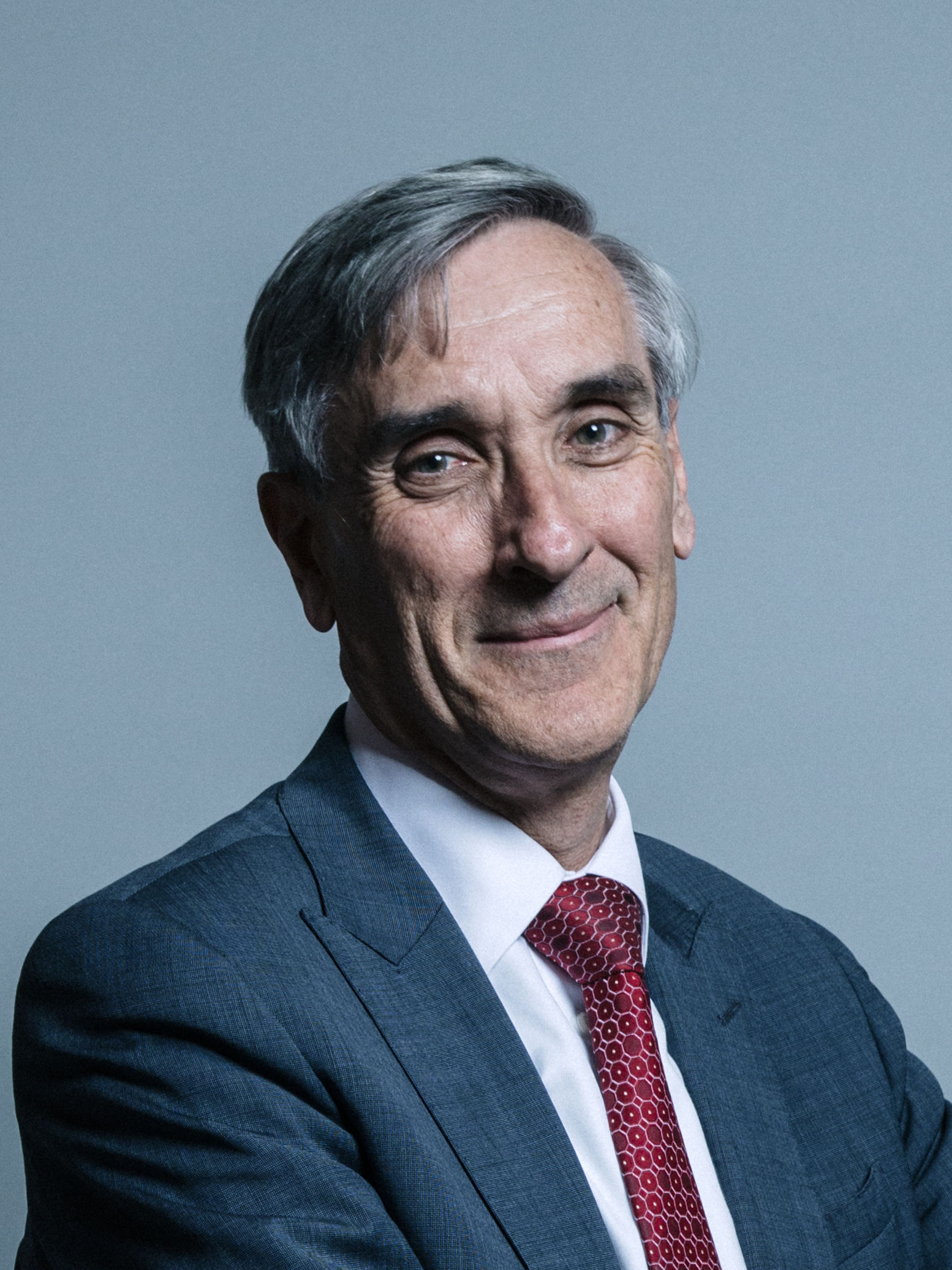
Sir John Redwood MP

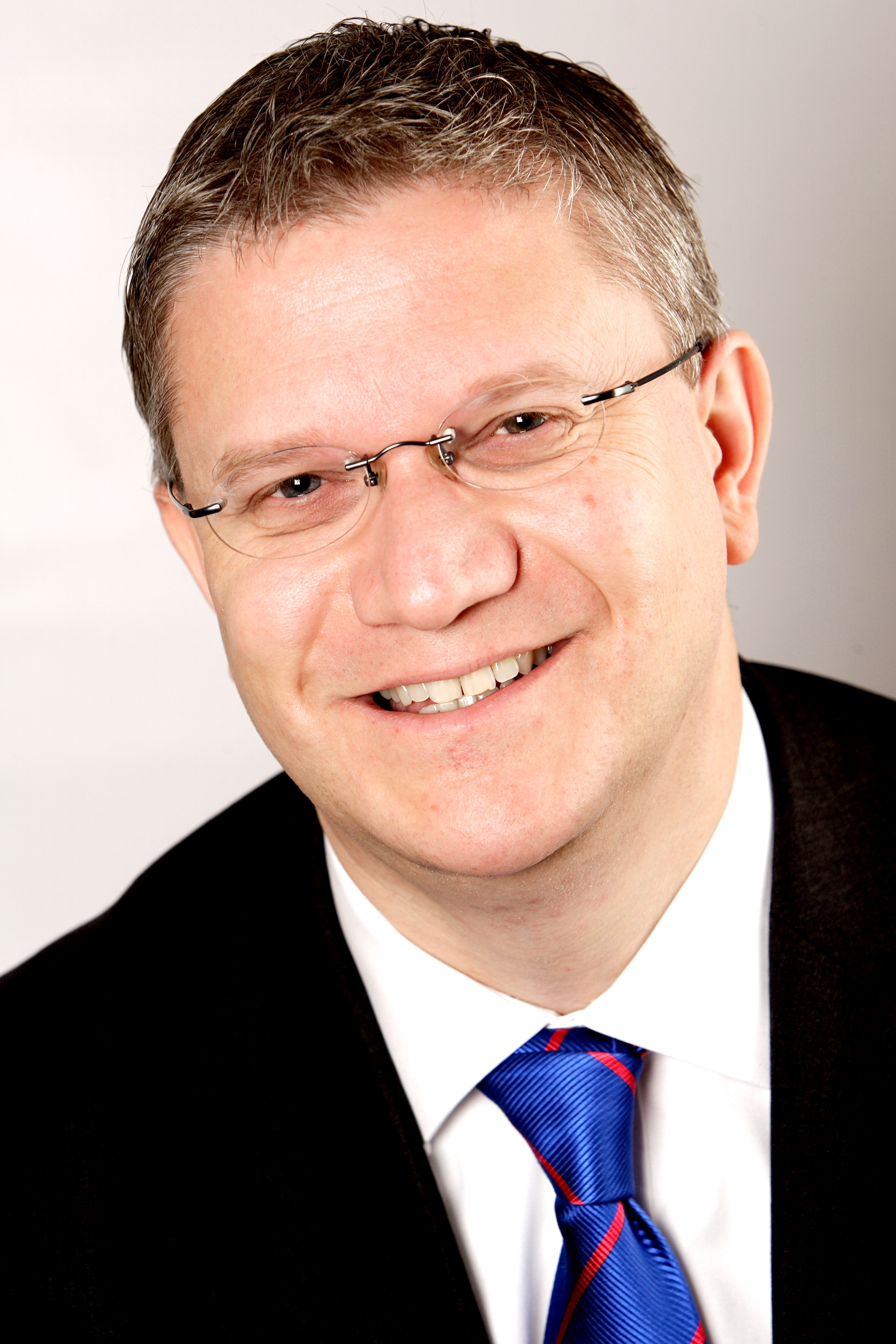
Andrew Rosindell MP

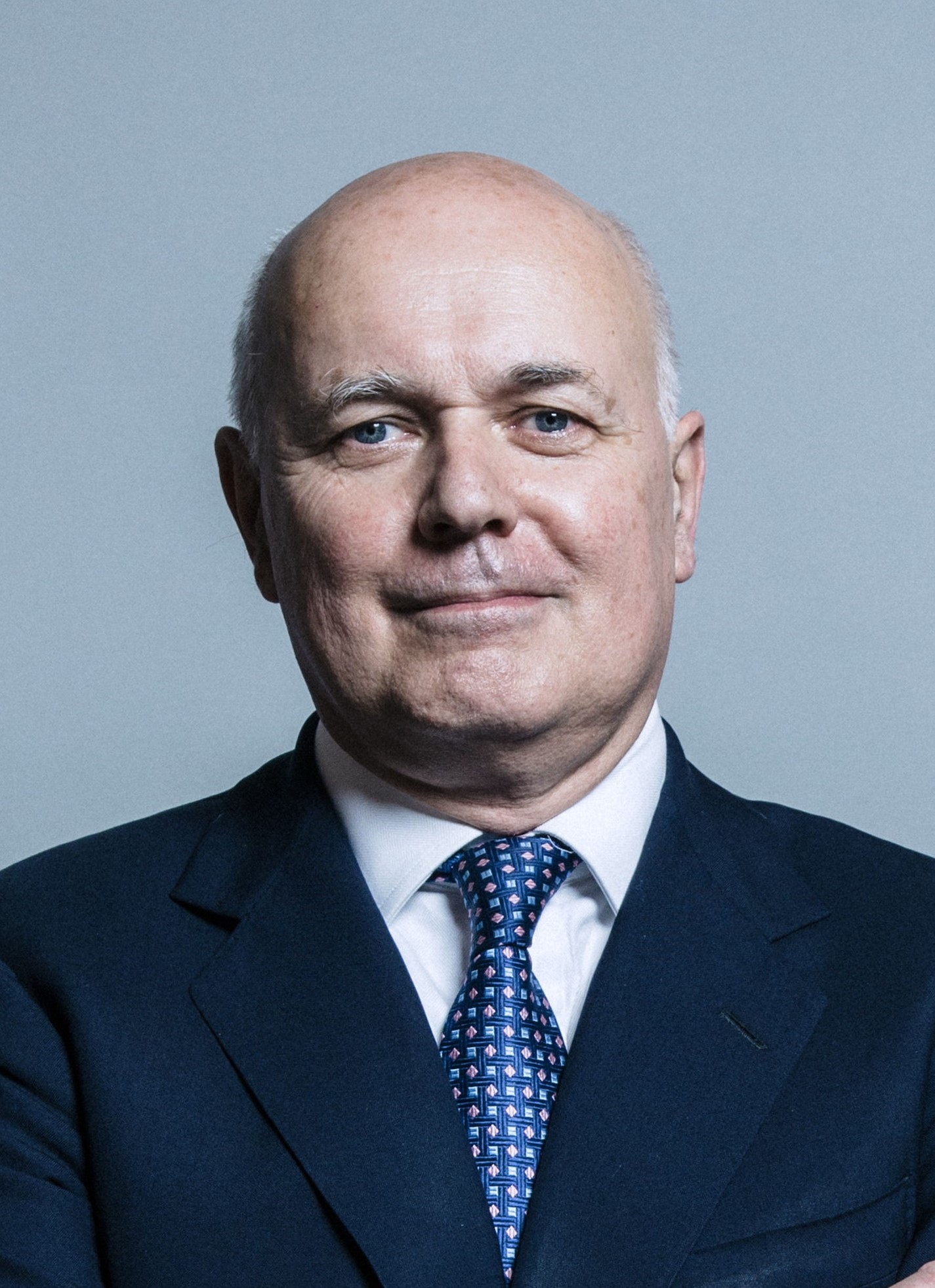
Sir Iain Duncan Smith MP

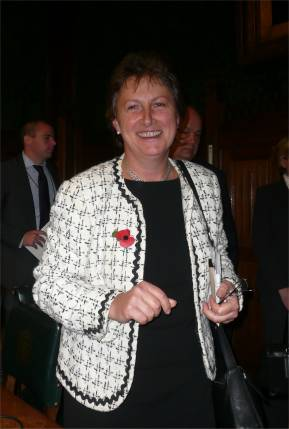
Baroness Stuart

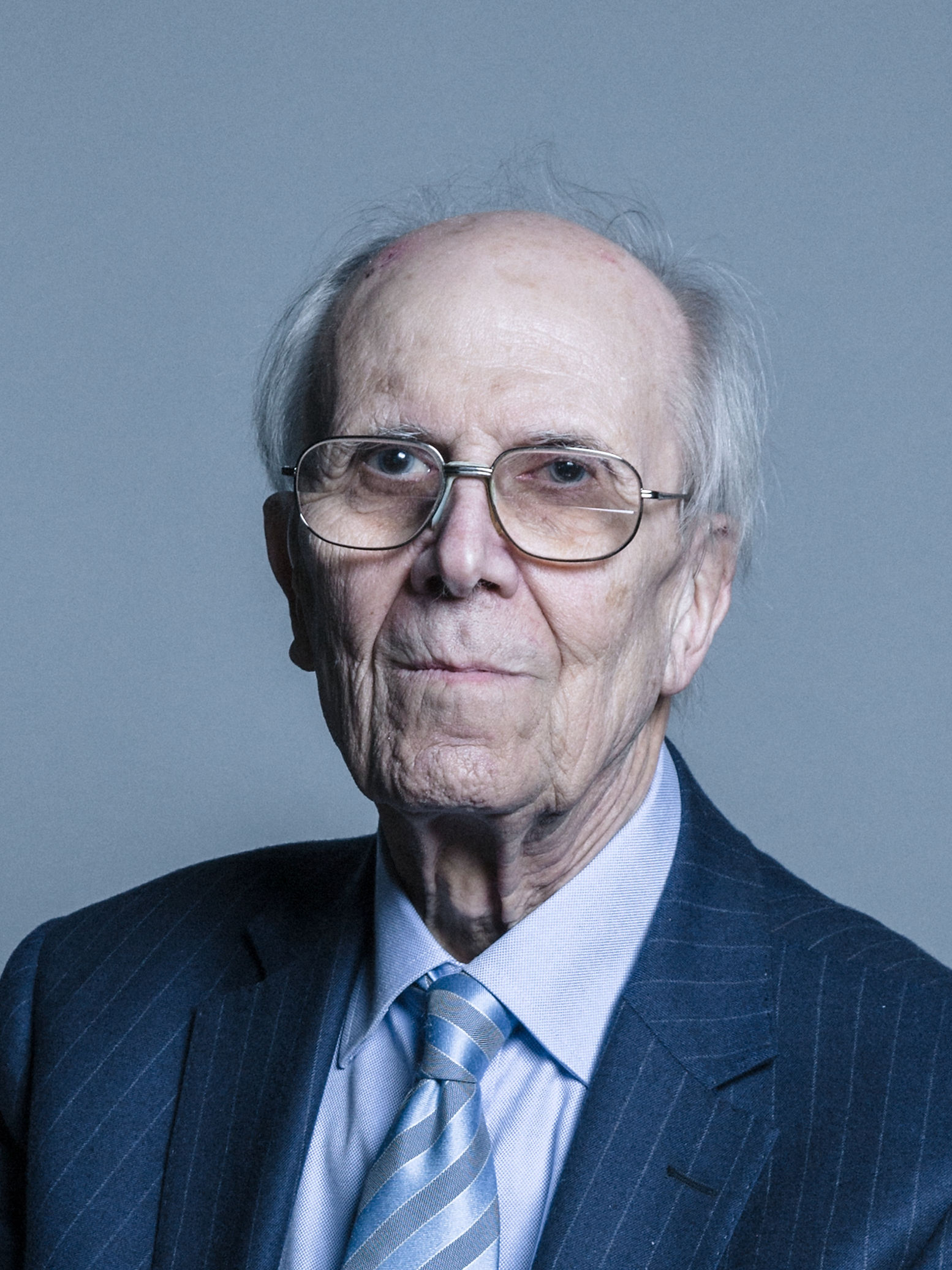
Lord Tebbit

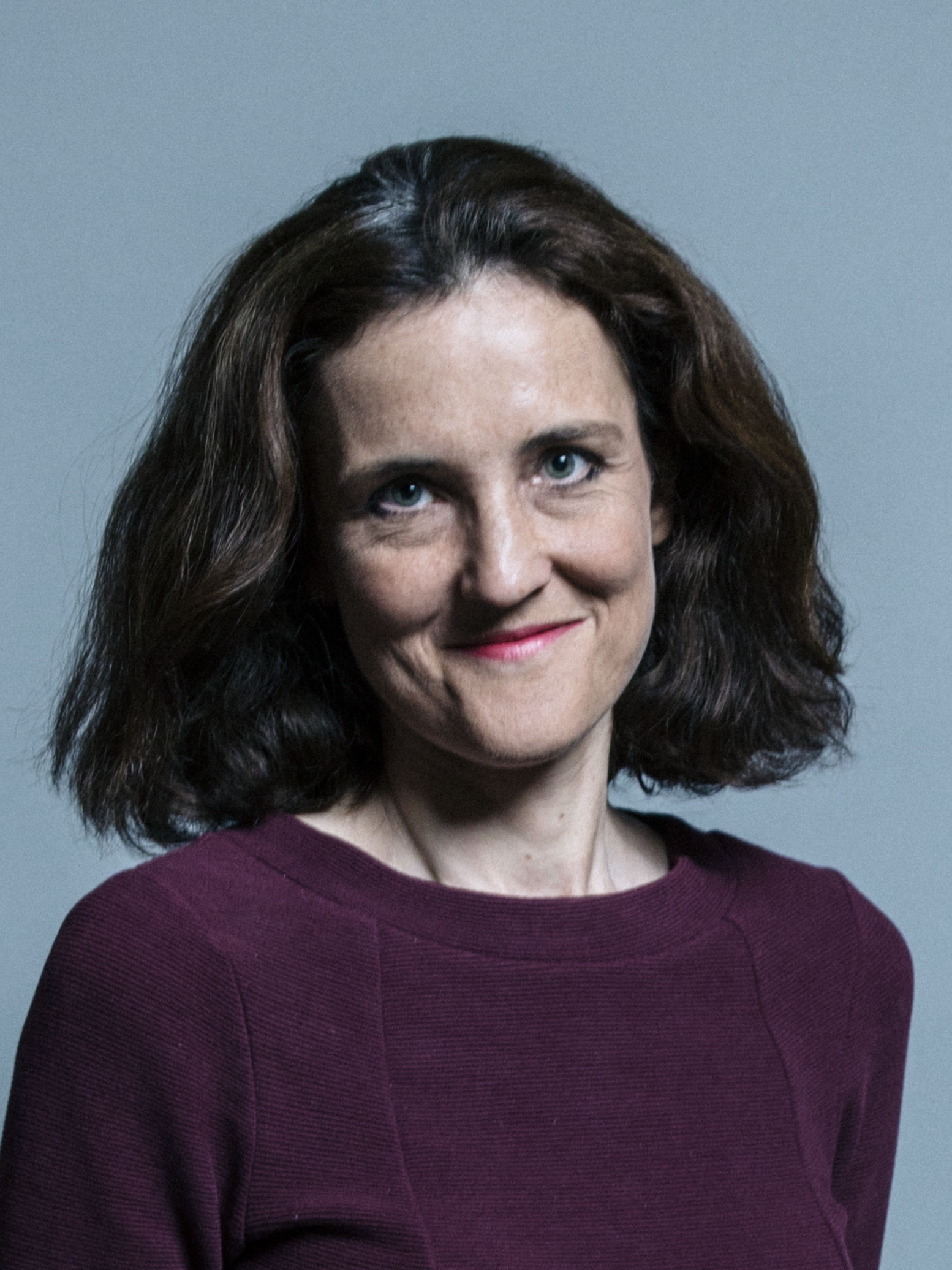
Theresa Villiers MP

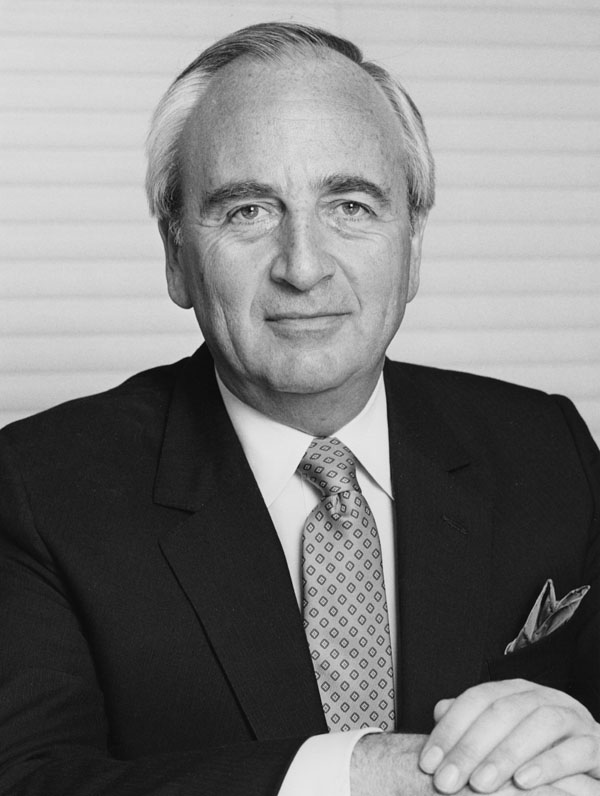
Lord Young of Graffham

== Activities ==
The Bruges Group seeks to keep debate on European issues centre stage by commissioning and publishing independent research and by holding meetings and conferences to discuss relevant issues. These events have covered topics like the European Union, immigration, trade, and the euro, and they seek to inform decision-makers and opinion-formers, especially those in Parliament and the media. The Bruges Group also monitors and assesses the voting of members of parliament.

The Bruges Group contends that the EU seeks to extend its influence over individual states’ right to manage their own affairs. As a result, the Group has extended its remit to monitor the EU's policies and regulations relating to the increasing costs of membership, defence, international relations, climate change, national identity, immigration and healthcare.

Internationally the Bruges Group has been particularly active in supporting Euroscepticism in Estonia and discussing issues relating to Turkey and the EU.

=== 2016 Brexit referendum ===
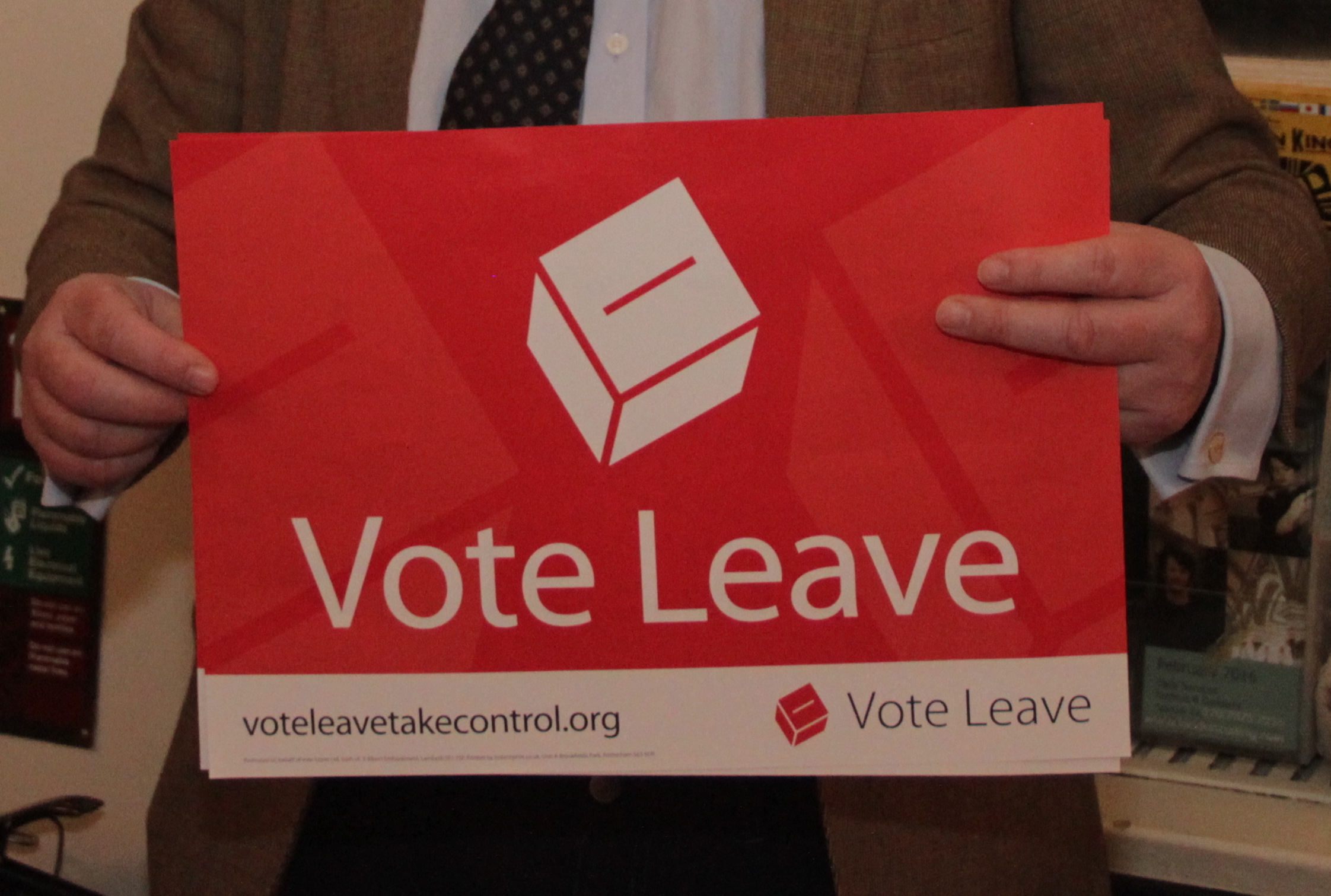
Brexit supporter holds a 'Vote Leave' sign ahead of the 2016 referendum

Through events, meetings, and papers, the Bruges Group played a key part in the 2016 Brexit referendum in which 51.9 percent of validated votes (37.4 per cent of the electorate) were in favour of leaving the European Union. Following the Leave campaign's win in the referendum, historian Andrew Roberts credited in part director Robert Oulds and the Bruges Group with keeping the popular insurgency alive over more than four decades. In 2019, Jacob Rees-Mogg, MP for North East Somerset and the chairman of the European Research Group, delivered a speech to the Group stating that a 'no deal' Brexit should not be 'taken off the table'.

=== Outreach ===
The Bruges Group regularly holds public events that advocate for looser ties with Brussels and an independent Britain. The group's director, Robert Oulds, is sometimes quoted in the press and makes regular appearances on TV and radio discussing European issues. Spokesmen for the Bruges Group have also appeared on BBC TV News, ITN; Sky News; The Daily Politics; BBC World Service; BBC Radio 5 Live and international media outlets. The organization regularly publishes working papers, leaflets, press releases, and interviews with politicians.

Denis MacShane, a former Labour politician and convicted fraudster, remarked that the Bruges Group 'carries a great deal of anti-EU material but set within the bounds of reasonable discourse'. The Bruges Group is also sometimes asked by the media to comment on the positions and policies of the Conservative Party.

The Bruges Group is active on various social media platforms including Facebook, Twitter, LinkedIn, and Instagram. The group regularly posts updates and information about events, articles, and recently published blog posts, as well as relevant Brexit and EU related news.

== See also ==
- Brexit
- 2016 United Kingdom European Union membership referendum
- List of think tanks in the United Kingdom
- Leave.EU
