= Bruges speech =

1988 speech by Margaret Thatcher

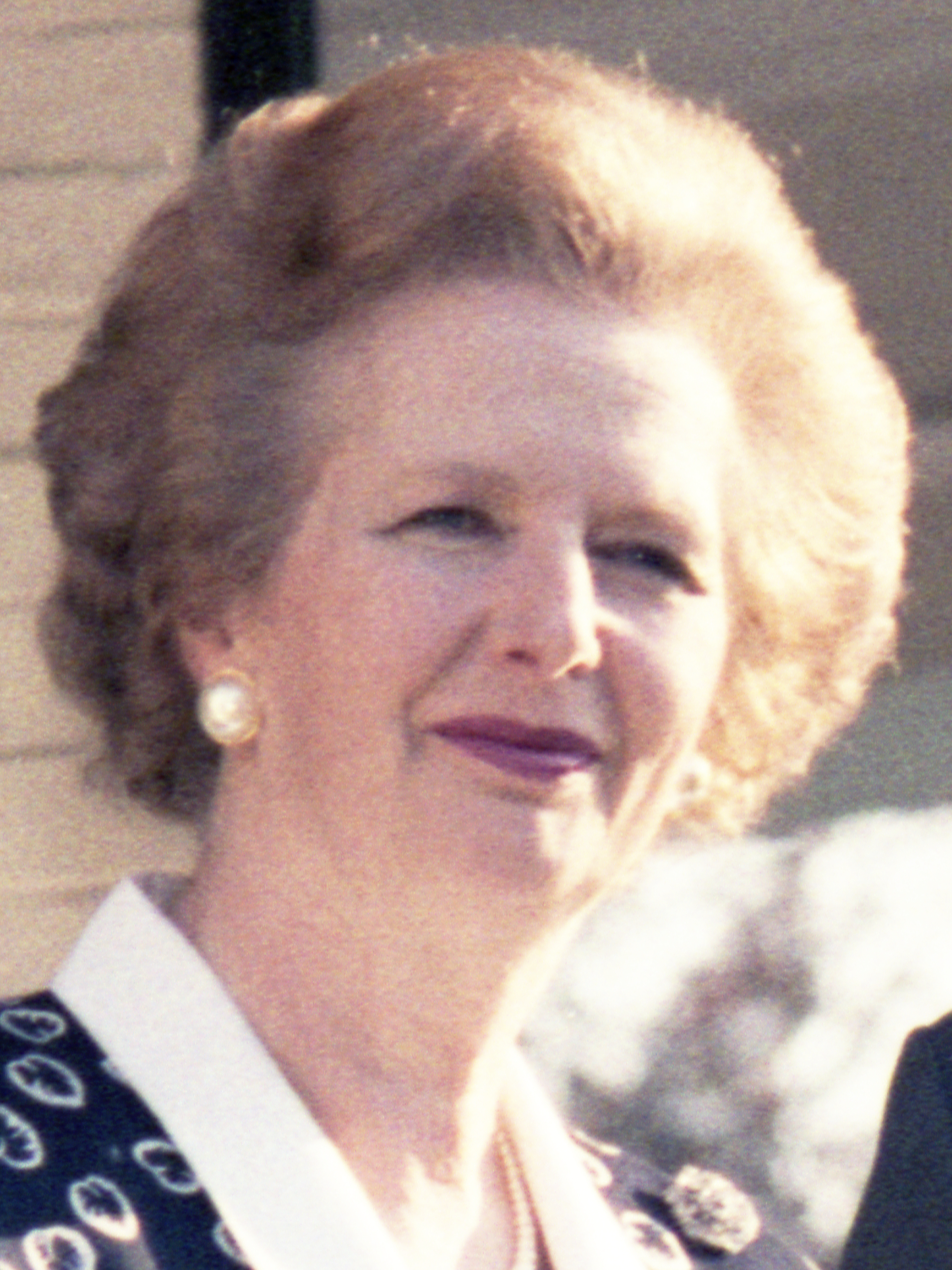
Prime Minister Margaret Thatcher in 1987

The Bruges speech was given by British prime minister Margaret Thatcher to the College of Europe at the Belfry of Bruges, Belgium, on 20 September 1988. Thatcher was opposed to any moves to transition the European Economic Community (EEC) into a federal Europe that would take powers away from its members. She considered European Commission president Jacques Delors a campaigner for federalisation and clashed with him publicly. Earlier in 1988, Delors had reaffirmed his commitment for the EEC to take a greater role in establishing European economic, fiscal and social legislation, which Thatcher considered provocative. On 8 September, Delors spoke to Britain's Trades Union Congress, calling for their support.

Thatcher had been invited to speak to the College of Europe in Bruges and decided to make her text a response to Delors's speech of 8 September. Thatcher's speech recounted Britain's history within and close connection to Europe and called for the EEC to resist a move towards centralisation of power. She called for reforms to the Common Agricultural Policy and for the EEC to continue to support the work of NATO. One of the most famous and controversial passages was her remark that "we have not embarked on the business of throwing back the frontiers of state at home only to see a European superstate getting ready to exercise a new dominance from Brussels".

Despite its commitment that Britain would work within the EEC to reform it, the speech was perceived as anti-Europe. The speech exposed a divide in the Conservative Party between those favouring federalisation and the majority who opposed it. Thatcher's foreign secretary Geoffrey Howe was greatly affected by the speech; his later support, with Chancellor of the Exchequer Nigel Lawson, for Britain to join the European Exchange Rate Mechanism eventually led to Thatcher's resignation. The Bruges Group, a British Eurosceptic think tank, was named after the speech. Some have described it as "setting the UK on the path to Brexit".

== Background ==
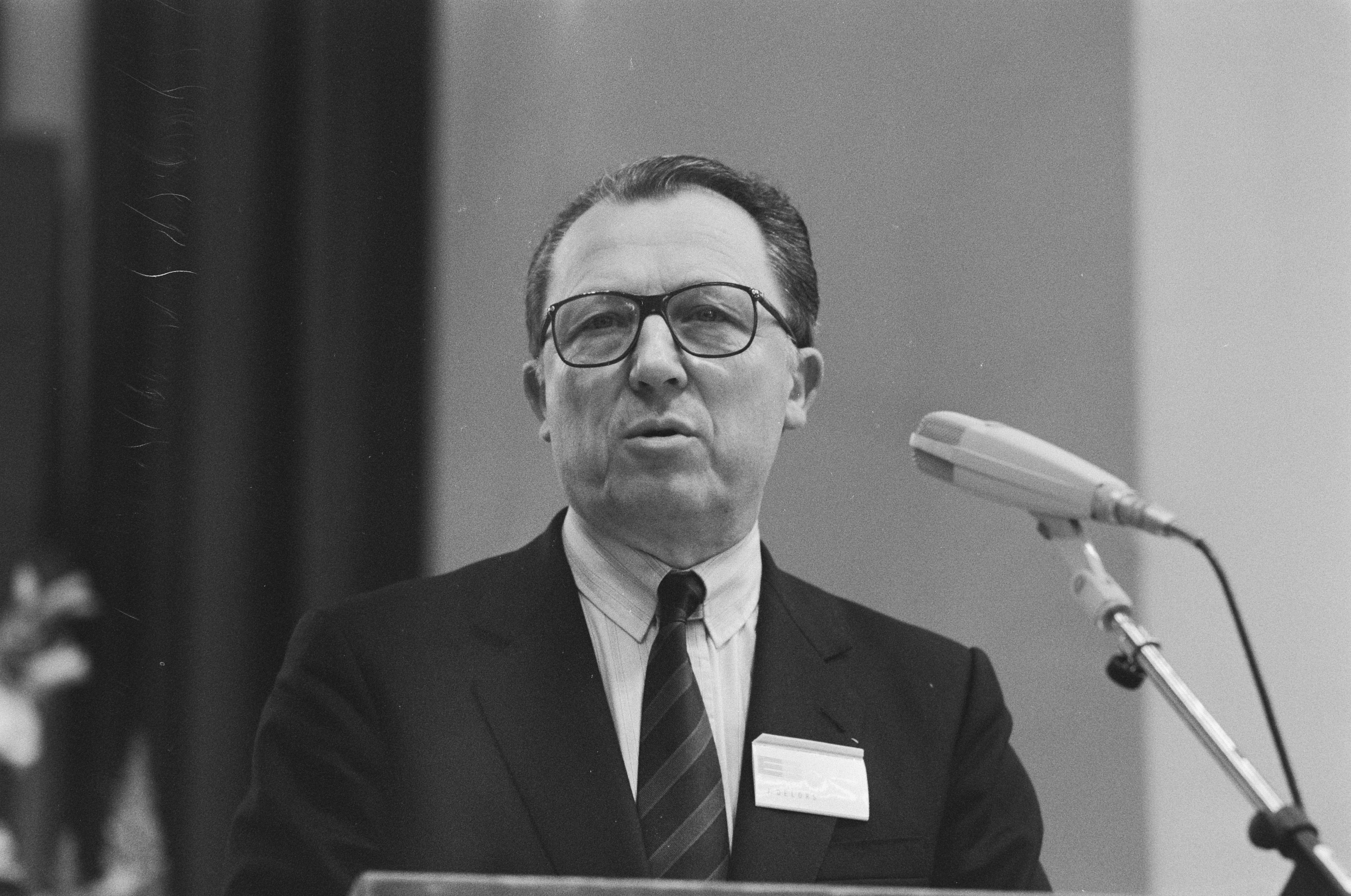
European Commission president Jacques Delors (pictured in 1988)

The European Economic Community (EEC), a common market and customs union for Western European states, was formed by the Treaty of Rome in 1957. The United Kingdom joined the organisation in 1973; by 1986, it included most non-Communist European states. The 1987 Single European Act gave the Community's governing bodies (the European Commission, European Parliament and Council of Ministers) greater roles in managing policies on the environment, health, education and other areas.

Margaret Thatcher, the prime minister of the United Kingdom, resented the power being granted to the Commission and its president Jacques Delors, who she considered a leading campaigner for a federal Europe. Thatcher and Delors became involved in several public clashes, which dismayed Thatcher's foreign secretary Geoffrey Howe, who was more sympathetic to Delors's policies.

On 6 July 1988, Delors spoke to the European Parliament and predicted that "10 years hence, 80 per cent of our economic legislation, and perhaps even our fiscal and social legislation, will be of Community origin". Thatcher perceived this as a provocation, a deliberate crossing of the Rubicon away from national sovereignty and towards federation. Delors made a speech to the Trades Union Congress (TUC) on 8 September, calling for their support for the Commission's attempts to strengthen the powers of unions. Thatcher had previously clashed with the trade unions during her successful campaign to strengthen the British economy. Thatcher decided to use an upcoming speech to the College of Europe, an academic organisation based in Bruges, Belgium, to respond to Delors's speech to the TUC. The year marked a dramatic change in Thatcher's position on Europe from pragmatic acceptance to distinct opposition to further integration, which she would reflect in the speech.

Much of Thatcher's speech was drafted by her foreign-policy adviser Charles Powell and Conservative peer Hugh Thomas, Baron Thomas of Swynnerton. Drafts of the speech were sent to the Foreign Office for review. Howe noted that there were "some plain and fundamental errors" and did not like references to a United States of Europe. He did not object to it, although the final version of the speech contained some significant changes. Howe did praise one passage in the draft that remained unchanged in the final version: "let me say bluntly on behalf of Britain: we have not embarked on the business of throwing back the frontiers of state at home only to see a European superstate getting ready to exercise a new dominance from Brussels". This passage would become one of the most controversial of the speech.

== Speech ==
External videos
- Speech to the College of Europe
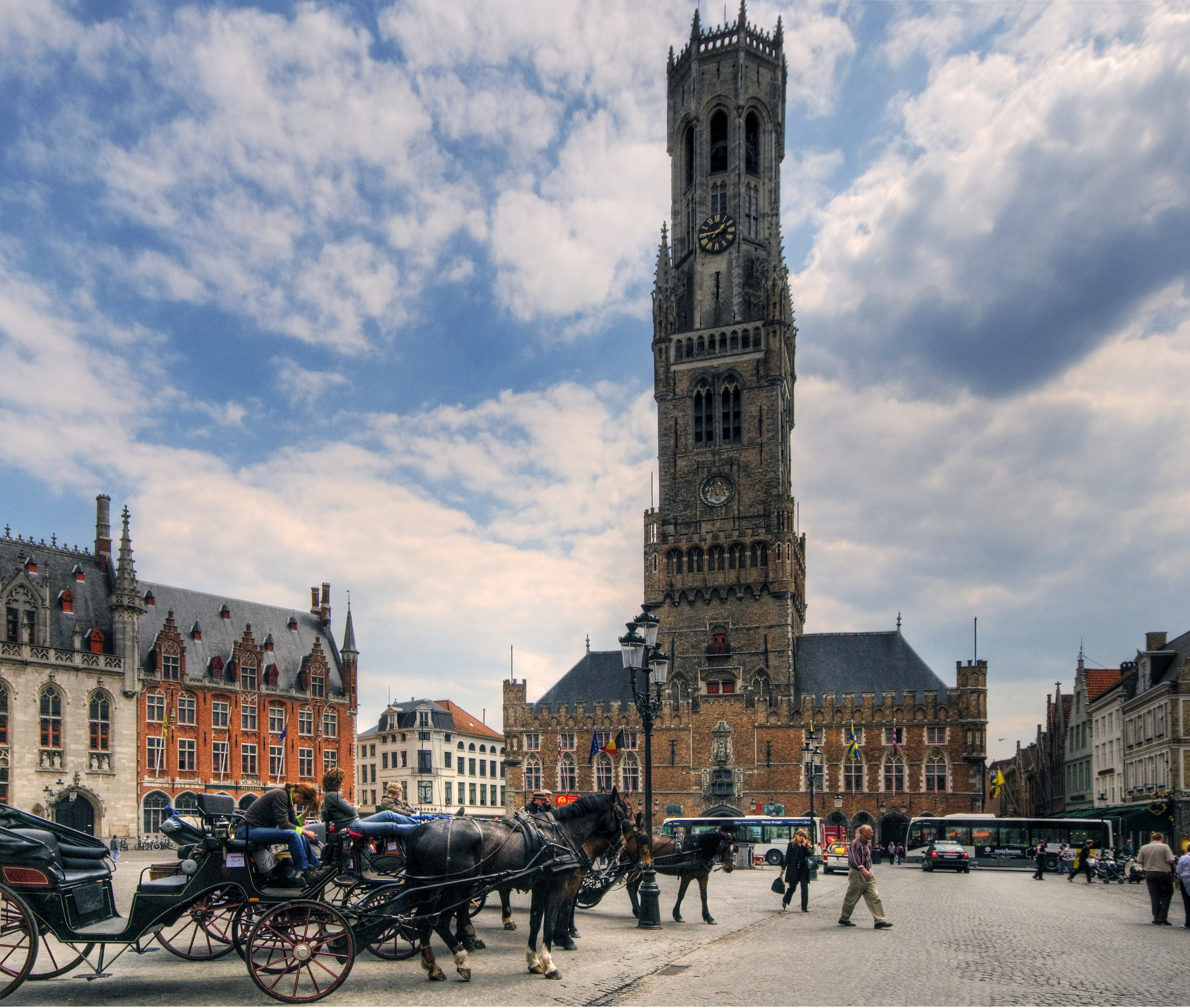
- Belfry of Bruges (pictured in 2008)
- [Film] (Speech) – via the Margaret Thatcher Foundation.

The speech was to be in a hall at the historic Belfry of Bruges on 20 September 1988. Thatcher had planned to use an autocue but because of the venue's layout, with most of the audience sat to her sides, she chose to speak from her paper notes. She deviated slightly from the text but not in any politically meaningful manner. A copy was sent in advance to Delors and, having read it, he refused to attend the event. The Belgian prime minister, Wilfried Martens, was in the audience.

Thatcher began her speech by noting that her last appearance before the College had been shortly after the Zeebrugge ferry disaster, in which Belgians had saved many British lives. Thatcher also praised the College's rector, Professor Jerzy Łukaszewski, and the institution's role in the EEC. She went on to reference Bruges's long history and the city's association with English literary figures such as Geoffrey Chaucer and William Caxton. She thanked the College for having the courage to invite her to speak on the topic of Europe and noted that some federalists would regard it as "rather like inviting Genghis Khan to speak on the virtues of peaceful coexistence".

Thatcher stated that she believed that the culture of Europe did not begin when the Treaty of Rome was signed but was instead the product of thousands of years of shared history. She noted that Britain had long been associated with Europe and that its ancestors were Romans, Celts, Saxons and Danes. Thatcher stated that her "nation was—in that favourite Community word—'restructured' under the Norman and Angevin rule in the eleventh and twelfth centuries" and referred to the Glorious Revolution of 1688, where the Dutch William of Orange ascended the English throne. Thatcher afterwards noted Britain's history as a home for those fleeing tyranny on Continental Europe and her later fights "to prevent Europe from falling under the dominance of a single power". In a passage that had not been in the original draft seen by Howe she referred to the British First World War dead: "Only miles from here, in Belgium, lie the bodies of 120,000 British soldiers who died in the First World War. Had it not been for that willingness to fight and to die, Europe would have been united long before now—but not in liberty, not in justice". She afterwards noted that Britain had supported the European resistance movements against Nazi Germany in the Second World War. Thatcher stated that Britain's commitment to Europe remained, as seen in the 70,000 British Armed Forces service members deployed on the continent. She urged the audience not to forget those parts of Europe under communist rule, stating, "we shall always look on Warsaw, Prague and Budapest as great European cities". Thatcher said that European values had led the United States of America to become a "valiant defender of freedom".

Thatcher then stated that "the European Community belongs to all its members. It must reflect the traditions and aspirations of all its members" and that Britain did not desire "some cosy, isolated existence on the fringes of the European Community" but to remain within it. To ensure this, she asked the EEC not to become "ossified by endless regulation" and that it must respect each nation's customs and traditions and not try to mould them into a single European identity. She argued that the EEC should not look to model itself upon the US and that it seemed to be moving towards greater centralisation of power at the same time that the Soviet Union was moving away from it (perestroika).

Thatcher hailed the success of the February 1988 European Council meeting in cutting expenditure on storing and disposing of food surpluses generated by the Common Agricultural Policy (CAP) and called for continued reform of the CAP, which she described as "unwieldy, inefficient and grossly expensive". She suggested that by doing so, the agriculture budget could be redirected towards training and aid. Thatcher urged the EEC to learn the lessons of history that "central planning and detailed control do not work and that personal endeavour and initiative do" and to move towards free enterprise in a single market. She stated, "of course, we want to make it easier for goods to pass through frontiers. Of course, we must make it easier for people to travel throughout the Community[,]" but some frontier controls were essential for security purposes. Thatcher argued against protectionism and in favour of international aid to developing countries. Thatcher stressed the importance of NATO and the US to the defence of Europe and argued that the Western European Union should not be seen as an alternative to NATO.

Thatcher concluded by arguing that Europe did not require any more treaties beyond the North Atlantic Treaty, the Brussels Treaty and the Treaty of Rome. Her closing remarks were: "Let Europe be a family of nations, understanding each other better, appreciating each other more, doing more together but relishing our national identity no less than our common European endeavour. Let us have a Europe which plays its full part in the wider world, which looks outward not inward, and which preserves that Atlantic community—that Europe on both sides of the Atlantic—which is our noblest inheritance and our greatest strength".

The text of the speech was released to the media at 17:30 GMT by the Downing Street press office. After finishing her speech, Thatcher left the event with her husband, Denis, and travelled to Brussels for an audience with King Baudouin. Afterwards, she had dinner with Prime Minister Martens and his cabinet members, during which a row erupted after Belgian foreign minister Leo Tindemans made a federalist comment.

== Impact ==
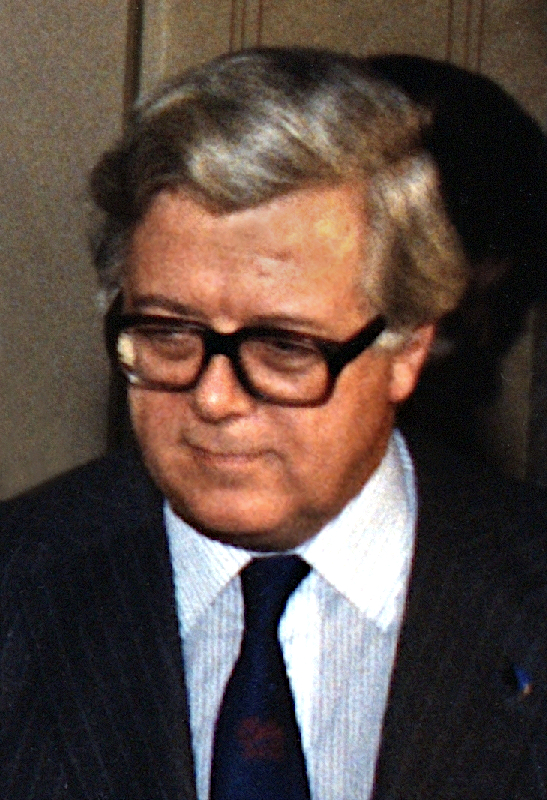
Thatcher's foreign secretary Geoffrey Howe, pictured in 1985

The speech was perceived as an attack on the "European project". However, Thatcher supported the Common Market and had intended the speech to be anti-federalist, not anti-Europe. Delors admitted that "technically it was a good speech, well written, beautiful phrases. She was very direct, very comprehensible" but considered it to be an attack on the EEC. Lord Thomas of Swynnerton was at heart a Europhile and was disappointed that the speech was perceived as being anti-Europe. The speech was seen as a warning against expanding the remit of the EEC beyond the limits of the Treaty of Rome into the social policy of member states. Though it did not mention socialism by name, the speech was seen as implying that the EEC was turning into a socialist state. The author Robin Harris considered the speech the most important of Thatcher's prime-ministerial career. He regarded it as marking British resistance to the Economic and Monetary Union and setting out an alternative model for European cooperation under a voluntary association of independent states.

Though, in essence, a pro-European speech, it quickly became a symbol of hostility to Europe, behind which Eurosceptics rallied. The address exposed a divide in the Conservative Party between the minority of European federalists and the majority who were opposed. Former prime minister Edward Heath, who had handled the original negotiations on the British accession to the European Communities, broke the precedent against criticising a sitting Government while the Prime Minister is engaged in foreign negotiations by travelling to Brussels while Thatcher was there to attend the 1988 NATO summit to deliver a rebuttal personally. The Bruges speech greatly affected Howe, who considered Thatcher's position to be at odds with his own, and on 4 May 1989 he met with the Chancellor of the Exchequer, Nigel Lawson, who had been planning for the country to join the European Exchange Rate Mechanism (ERM), an EEC economic stability measure, against Thatcher's wishes. Howe and Lawson continued to lobby Thatcher on the matter; however, Lawson resigned when Thatcher refused to sack her chief economic adviser Sir Alan Walters, who opposed British membership of the ERM. Britain eventually joined the ERM on 5 October, under Lawson's replacement as chancellor John Major. The political decision ultimately led to Thatcher's resignation and replacement by Major, who came to prominence for his role in the ERM decision. Thatcher became increasingly sceptical of the EEC after her resignation.

After the Bruges speech, there was an increasing trend towards Euroscepticism in the Conservative Party. This created difficulties during Major's negotiations to pass the Maastricht Treaty, the founding document of the European Union (EU), under which increased powers were granted to the European institutions. An agreement was eventually reached, and Britain passed the treaty, though it retained an opt-out on the Social Chapter until this was given up by Labour prime minister Tony Blair in 1997. Britain left the EU on 31 January 2020, after a nationwide referendum on the matter. The Bruges speech is sometimes described as "setting the UK on the path to Brexit" (Conservative peer Lord Willetts), though some writers such as David Allen Green have stated that this was not the case and was instead "a call to battle" to reform the EEC.

The Eurosceptic Bruges Group think tank was founded in 1990 and named after the speech. The original drafts of the Bruges speech were released by the Margaret Thatcher Archive Trust in 2018 under the thirty-year rule. The drafts showed that the final speech had been considerably toned down. Direct references to Delors were removed, and those to the European Commission were replaced with "European community". The use of the term "Euro waffle" was also removed.

== See also ==
- "No. No. No."
