= 1975 Brussels NATO summit =

1975 NATO summit meeting in Brussels, Belgium

Brussels summit
- Host country: Belgium
- Dates: 29–30 May 1975

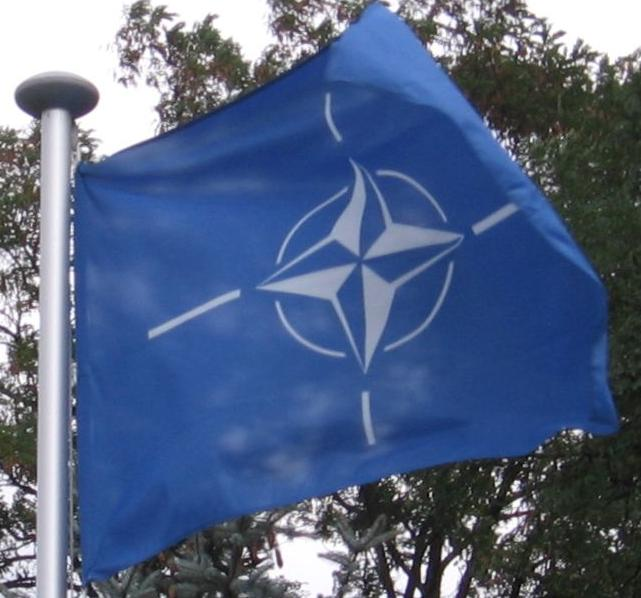
NATO flag

The 1975 Brussels summit was the third NATO summit bringing the leaders of member nations together at the same time. The formal sessions and informal meetings in Brussels, Belgium took place on 29–30 May 1975. This event was only the fourth meeting of the NATO heads of state following the ceremonial signing of the North Atlantic Treaty on 4 April 1949.

== Background ==
In this period, the organization faced a generational challenge; and the unresolved questions concerned whether a new generation of leaders would be as committed to NATO as their predecessors had been.

== Agenda ==
The general discussions focused on the need for affirming of the fundamental importance of the Alliance, Other topics included,

- Allied cohesion in the face of international economic pressures following the 1974 oil crisis; and
- Support for successful conclusion of negotiations in the framework of the Conference on Security and Cooperation in Europe (CSCE).

== See also ==
- EU summit
- G8 summit
