= 1974 Brussels NATO summit =

1974 NATO summit meeting in Brussels, Belgium

Brussels summit
- Host country: Belgium
- Dates: June 26, 1974

The 1974 Brussels summit was the second NATO summit bringing the leaders of member nations together at the same time. The formal sessions and informal meetings in Brussels, Belgium took place on June 26, 1974. This twenty-fifth anniversary event was only the third meeting of the NATO heads of state following the ceremonial signing of the North Atlantic Treaty on April 4, 1949.

The Summit took place 25 days before the Turkish invasion of Cyprus, the first war between 2 NATO Countries and parties.

== Background ==
The organization faced a generational challenge; and the unresolved questions concerned whether a new generation of leaders would be as committed to NATO as their predecessors had been. The results of 1974 elections would change a significant number of officials at the top of allied governments—in the Britain, Prime Minister Edward Heath was replaced by the election of Harold Wilson; in France, President Georges Pompidou was replaced by Giscard d'Estaing; and in West Germany, Chancellor Willy Brandt was replaced by Helmut Schmidt. The 1974 resignation of President Richard Nixon caused Gerald Ford to become the new head of the American government.

== Agenda ==
The general discussions focused on the need to confirm the dedication of member countries of the Alliance to the aims and ideals of the Treaty in the 25th anniversary of its signature. In addition, there were informal consultations on East-West relations in preparation for US-USSR summit talks on strategic nuclear arms limitations.

== Ottawa Declaration on Atlantic Relations ==
NATO leaders signed the 14-point Ottawa Declaration on Atlantic Relations, which had been adopted by NATO foreign ministers in a meeting a week earlier. Henry Kissinger led the document. It recognised the contribution of the British and French nuclear forces to NATO deterrence capabilities, and declared "support for the strengthening of links among parliamentarians."

== See also ==
- EU summit
- G8 summit
