= 1982 Bonn NATO summit =

1982 NATO summit meeting in Bonn, West Germany

Bonn summit
- Host country: West Germany
- Dates: 10 June 1982

The 1982 Bonn summit was the 6th NATO summit bringing the leaders of member nations together at the same time. The formal sessions and informal meetings in Bonn took place on 10 June 1982. This event was only the seventh meeting of the NATO heads of state following the ceremonial signing of the North Atlantic Treaty on 4 April 1949. When the summit was held, there were sixteen members of NATO.

== Background ==
In this period, the organization faced unresolved questions concerning whether a new generation of leaders would be as committed to NATO as their predecessors had been. The Bonn Summit addressed many issues and discussed many topics. Most notable of these topics was the accession of Spain to NATO, as the summit was held years after the fall of Francisco Franco. The summit also voiced concern to the perceived threat the Soviet Union posed to members of NATO.

== See also ==
- EU summit
- G8 summit
