= December 1989 Brussels NATO summit =

1989 NATO summit meeting in Brussels, Belgium

Brussels summit
- Host country: Belgium
- Dates: 14 and 15 December 1989

The December 1989 NATO summit was a summit held for the North Atlantic Treaty Organization. The summit was held in Brussels, Belgium. This summit was the tenth NATO summit to bring world leaders from NATO together, which marked the 40th anniversary of the formation of NATO. Manfred Wörner headed the summit, and there were sixteen NATO members when the summit was held.

== Background and discussion ==
In this period, the organization faced conventional questions about whether a new generation of leaders would be as committed to NATO as their predecessors had been. The summit was held during the end of the Cold War, when democratic reforms were being introduced throughout the Eastern Bloc. The fall of the Berlin Wall, and numerous other events were widely discussed during the summit. The summit affirmed its support of democratic reforms in the Eastern Bloc.

== See also ==
- EU summit
- G8 summit
