= 1985 Brussels NATO summit =

1985 NATO summit meeting in Brussels, Belgium

Brussels summit
- Host country: Belgium
- Dates: 21 November 1985
- Chair: Lord Carrington

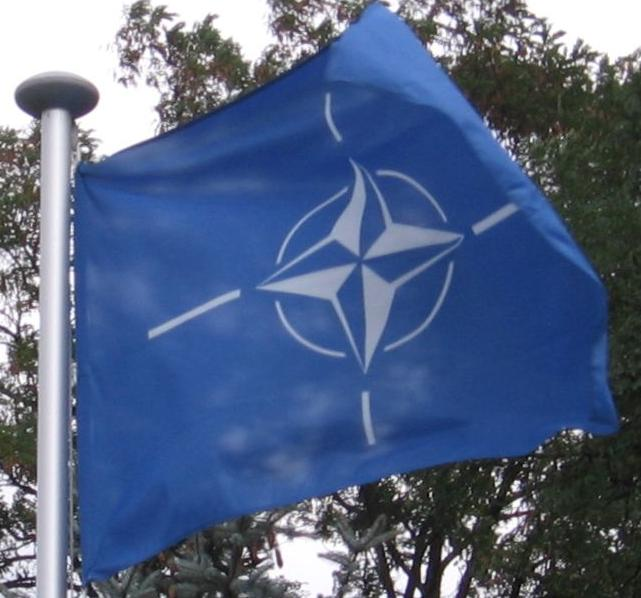
NATO flag

The 1985 Brussels summit was the 7th NATO summit bringing the leaders of member nations together at the same time. The formal sessions and informal meetings in Brussels, Belgium took place on 21 November 1985. This event was only the eighth meeting of the NATO heads of state following the ceremonial signing of the North Atlantic Treaty on 4 April 1949. Lord Carrington was Secretary General of NATO at the time, and he chaired the meeting.

== Background ==
In this period, the organization faced unresolved questions concerned whether a new generation of leaders would be as committed to NATO as their predecessors had been. Generational change in the leadership of the Soviet Union brought Mikhail Gorbachev to the international stage.

Carrington wrote for EUROPÄISCHE WEHRKUNDE a briefing paper entitled "Challenges to the Alliance".

== North Atlantic Council meeting summary ==
President Reagan told the North Atlantic Council about his recent meeting with Gorbachev. The meeting happened in the wake of the 1985 Geneva summit and was simply a report on developments there. Carrington remarked on the Ministerial meeting that was scheduled to occur in December.

== Ministerial meeting ==
The Defence Planning Committee of NATO met in Ministerial Session in Brussels over three days from 3 December 1986; day one of the meeting was devoted to a briefing on the Reagan-Gorbachev summit, while the discussion over the final two days centred on the Annual Defence Review and the adoption of the NATO Force Plan 1987-1991, which "reflected our determination to give these Alliance priority areas special emphasis in our national plans and programmes."

Of special note was the attention paid to the December 1984 decision to acquire more ammunition stocks for selected battle decisive systems. The objective was for each ally to maintain 30 days worth of munitions in order to prepare battle readiness.

== See also ==
- EU summit
- G8 summit
