= 1988 Brussels NATO summit =

1988 NATO summit meeting in Brussels, Belgium

Brussels summit
- Host country: Belgium
- Dates: 2-3 March 1988

The 1988 Brussels summit was the 8th NATO summit bringing the leaders of member nations together at the same time. The formal sessions and informal meetings in Brussels, Belgium took place on 2–3 March 1988.

== Background ==
In this period, the organization faced unresolved questions concerned whether a new generation of leaders would be as committed to NATO as their predecessors had been. Generational change in the leadership of the Soviet Union brought Mikhail Gorbachev to the international stage; but NATO leaders were increasingly uneasy about how to respond to his personable qualities. British Prime Minister Margaret Thatcher counseled that it was probably a good idea to "do business" with him, but other NATO leaders were uncertain about what Gorbachev's openness might be hiding. These fears were minimized by the Soviet announcement that troops were going to be withdrawn from Afghanistan. The unilateral withdraw of 500,000 troops and 10,000 tanks from Eastern Europe sent an unmistakable message of change.

== Agenda ==
The general discussions focused on the need for a reaffirmation of the purpose and principles of the Alliance. Other informal meetings explored what NATO's posture should be in its objectives for East-West relations.

== Accomplishments ==
The summit's work was directed towards adoption of a blueprint for strengthening stability in the whole of Europe through conventional arms control negotiations.

== See also ==
- EU summit
- G8 summit
