= List of G7 leaders =

This is a list of the heads of state and heads of government of the Group of Seven nations at each G6, G7, or G8 summit since the organisation's inception in 1975. The Group currently consists of the seven largest industrialized democracies, Canada, France, Germany, Italy, Japan, the United Kingdom and the United States, and also formerly Russia. The European Union is also a member since 1977, represented by the President of the European Commission and the President of the European Council, who before 2009 was the leader of the state holding the rotating Presidency of the Council of the European Union, also sometimes coinciding with a G7/8 nation, and is since 2009 a permanent position. The G7 holds an annual summit, which each nation's head of government attends. Each year the heads of government take turns assuming the presidency, whose job it is to set the agenda for and host the annual summit.

While the current G7 consists of seven nations, it has not always done so. The group was formed as the Group of Six, G6, including all of today's members except Canada. Under the leadership of Prime Minister Pierre Trudeau, Canada joined in the second year of the group's existence, 1976, forming the Group of Seven, G7. Russia joined the Group of Eight, G8, in 1997, under the leadership of President Boris Yeltsin. Russia was suspended in March 2014 after the Russian annexation of Crimea, the group being thereafter again referred to as the Group of Seven.

Summit (Host)	State									
Summit (Host)	Canada	France	Germany	Italy	Japan	Russia	United Kingdom	United States	European Union	
Summit (Host)	Canada	France	Germany	Italy	Japan	Russia	United Kingdom	United States	Commission	Council
1st — 1975; France	Had not joined	Valéry Giscard d'Estaing	Helmut Schmidt	Aldo Moro	Takeo Miki	Had not joined	Harold Wilson	Gerald Ford	Had not joined	
2nd — 1976; United States	Pierre Trudeau	Valéry Giscard d'Estaing	Helmut Schmidt	Aldo Moro	Takeo Miki	Had not joined	James Callaghan	Gerald Ford	Had not joined	
3rd — 1977; United Kingdom	Pierre Trudeau	Valéry Giscard d'Estaing	Helmut Schmidt	Giulio Andreotti	Takeo Fukuda	Had not joined	James Callaghan	Jimmy Carter	Roy Jenkins	James Callaghan
4th — 1978; West Germany	Pierre Trudeau	Valéry Giscard d'Estaing	Helmut Schmidt	Giulio Andreotti	Takeo Fukuda	Had not joined	James Callaghan	Jimmy Carter	Roy Jenkins	Helmut Schmidt
5th — 1979; Japan	Joe Clark	Valéry Giscard d'Estaing	Helmut Schmidt	Giulio Andreotti	Masayoshi Ōhira	Had not joined	Margaret Thatcher	Jimmy Carter	Roy Jenkins	Valéry Giscard d'Estaing
6th — 1980; Italy	Pierre Trudeau	Valéry Giscard d'Estaing	Helmut Schmidt	Francesco Cossiga	Saburo Okita (Note: Okita was actually Foreign Minister of Japan at the time, filling in for Prime Minister Ōhira, who died 10 days before the conference began.)	Had not joined	Margaret Thatcher	Jimmy Carter	Roy Jenkins	Francesco Cossiga
7th — 1981; Canada	Pierre Trudeau	François Mitterrand	Helmut Schmidt	Giovanni Spadolini	Zenkō Suzuki	Had not joined	Margaret Thatcher	Ronald Reagan	Gaston Thorn	Margaret Thatcher
8th — 1982; France	Pierre Trudeau	François Mitterrand	Helmut Schmidt	Giovanni Spadolini	Zenkō Suzuki	Had not joined	Margaret Thatcher	Ronald Reagan	Gaston Thorn	(Belgium) Wilfried Martens
9th — 1983; United States	Pierre Trudeau	François Mitterrand	Helmut Kohl	Amintore Fanfani	Yasuhiro Nakasone	Had not joined	Margaret Thatcher	Ronald Reagan	Gaston Thorn	Helmut Kohl
10th — 1984; United Kingdom	Pierre Trudeau	François Mitterrand	Helmut Kohl	Bettino Craxi	Yasuhiro Nakasone	Had not joined	Margaret Thatcher	Ronald Reagan	Gaston Thorn	François Mitterrand
11th — 1985; West Germany	Brian Mulroney	François Mitterrand	Helmut Kohl	Bettino Craxi	Yasuhiro Nakasone	Had not joined	Margaret Thatcher	Ronald Reagan	Jacques Delors	Bettino Craxi
12th — 1986; Japan	Brian Mulroney	François Mitterrand	Helmut Kohl	Bettino Craxi	Yasuhiro Nakasone	Had not joined	Margaret Thatcher	Ronald Reagan	Jacques Delors	(Netherlands) Ruud Lubbers
13th — 1987; Italy	Brian Mulroney	François Mitterrand	Helmut Kohl	Amintore Fanfani	Yasuhiro Nakasone	Had not joined	Margaret Thatcher	Ronald Reagan	Jacques Delors	(Belgium) Wilfried Martens
14th — 1988; Canada	Brian Mulroney	François Mitterrand	Helmut Kohl	Ciriaco De Mita	Noboru Takeshita	Had not joined	Margaret Thatcher	Ronald Reagan	Jacques Delors	Helmut Kohl
15th — 1989; France	Brian Mulroney	François Mitterrand	Helmut Kohl	Ciriaco De Mita	Sōsuke Uno	Had not joined	Margaret Thatcher	George H. W. Bush	Jacques Delors	François Mitterrand
16th — 1990; United States	Brian Mulroney	François Mitterrand	Helmut Kohl	Giulio Andreotti	Toshiki Kaifu	Had not joined	Margaret Thatcher	George H. W. Bush	Jacques Delors	Giulio Andreotti
17th — 1991; United Kingdom	Brian Mulroney	François Mitterrand	Helmut Kohl	Giulio Andreotti	Toshiki Kaifu	Had not joined	John Major	George H. W. Bush	Jacques Delors	(Netherlands) Ruud Lubbers
18th — 1992; Germany	Brian Mulroney	François Mitterrand	Helmut Kohl	Giuliano Amato	Kiichi Miyazawa	Had not joined	John Major	George H. W. Bush	Jacques Delors	John Major
19th — 1993; Japan	Kim Campbell	François Mitterrand	Helmut Kohl	Carlo Azeglio Ciampi	Kiichi Miyazawa	Had not joined	John Major	Bill Clinton	Henning Christophersen (Note: Vice-President of the European Commission)	(Belgium) Jean-Luc Dehaene
20th — 1994; Italy	Jean Chrétien	François Mitterrand	Helmut Kohl	Silvio Berlusconi	Tomiichi Murayama	Had not joined	John Major	Bill Clinton	Jacques Delors	Helmut Kohl
21st — 1995; Canada	Jean Chrétien	Jacques Chirac	Helmut Kohl	Lamberto Dini	Tomiichi Murayama	Had not joined	John Major	Bill Clinton	Jacques Santer	Jacques Chirac
22nd — 1996; France	Jean Chrétien	Jacques Chirac	Helmut Kohl	Romano Prodi	Ryutaro Hashimoto	Had not joined	John Major	Bill Clinton	Jacques Santer	Romano Prodi
23rd — 1997; United States	Jean Chrétien	Jacques Chirac	Helmut Kohl	Romano Prodi	Ryutaro Hashimoto	Boris Yeltsin	Tony Blair	Bill Clinton	Jacques Santer	(Netherlands) Wim Kok
24th — 1998; United Kingdom	Jean Chrétien	Jacques Chirac	Helmut Kohl	Romano Prodi	Ryutaro Hashimoto	Boris Yeltsin	Tony Blair	Bill Clinton	Jacques Santer	Tony Blair
25th — 1999; Germany	Jean Chrétien	Jacques Chirac	Gerhard Schröder	Massimo D'Alema	Keizō Obuchi	Boris Yeltsin	Tony Blair	Bill Clinton	Manuel Marín (Note: Acting Commission President following the March 1999 resignation of the Santer Commission)	Gerhard Schröder
26th — 2000; Japan	Jean Chrétien	Jacques Chirac	Gerhard Schröder	Giuliano Amato	Yoshirō Mori	Vladimir Putin	Tony Blair	Bill Clinton	Romano Prodi	Jacques Chirac
27th — 2001; Italy	Jean Chrétien	Jacques Chirac	Gerhard Schröder	Silvio Berlusconi	Junichirō Koizumi	Vladimir Putin	Tony Blair	George W. Bush	Romano Prodi	(Belgium) Guy Verhofstadt
28th — 2002; Canada	Jean Chrétien	Jacques Chirac	Gerhard Schröder	Silvio Berlusconi	Junichirō Koizumi	Vladimir Putin	Tony Blair	George W. Bush	Romano Prodi	(Spain) José María Aznar
29th — 2003; France	Jean Chrétien	Jacques Chirac	Gerhard Schröder	Silvio Berlusconi	Junichirō Koizumi	Vladimir Putin	Tony Blair	George W. Bush	Romano Prodi	(Greece) Costas Simitis
30th — 2004; United States	Paul Martin	Jacques Chirac	Gerhard Schröder	Silvio Berlusconi	Junichirō Koizumi	Vladimir Putin	Tony Blair	George W. Bush	Romano Prodi	(Republic of Ireland) Bertie Ahern
31st — 2005; United Kingdom	Paul Martin	Jacques Chirac	Gerhard Schröder	Silvio Berlusconi	Junichirō Koizumi	Vladimir Putin	Tony Blair	George W. Bush	José Manuel Barroso	Tony Blair
32nd — 2006; Russia	Stephen Harper	Jacques Chirac	Angela Merkel	Romano Prodi	Junichirō Koizumi	Vladimir Putin	Tony Blair	George W. Bush	José Manuel Barroso	(Finland) Matti Vanhanen
33rd — 2007; Germany	Stephen Harper	Nicolas Sarkozy	Angela Merkel	Romano Prodi	Shinzō Abe	Vladimir Putin	Tony Blair	George W. Bush	José Manuel Barroso	Angela Merkel
34th — 2008; Japan	Stephen Harper	Nicolas Sarkozy	Angela Merkel	Silvio Berlusconi	Yasuo Fukuda	Dmitry Medvedev (Note: Medvedev attended the 2012 summit in place of President Putin who cited domestic obligations as his reason for not attending)	Gordon Brown	George W. Bush	José Manuel Barroso	Nicolas Sarkozy
35th — 2009; Italy	Stephen Harper	Nicolas Sarkozy	Angela Merkel	Silvio Berlusconi	Tarō Asō	Dmitry Medvedev	Gordon Brown	Barack Obama	José Manuel Barroso	(Sweden) Fredrik Reinfeldt
36th — 2010; Canada	Stephen Harper	Nicolas Sarkozy	Angela Merkel	Silvio Berlusconi	Naoto Kan	Dmitry Medvedev	David Cameron	Barack Obama	José Manuel Barroso	Herman Van Rompuy
37th — 2011; France	Stephen Harper	Nicolas Sarkozy	Angela Merkel	Silvio Berlusconi	Naoto Kan	Dmitry Medvedev	David Cameron	Barack Obama	José Manuel Barroso	Herman Van Rompuy
38th — 2012; United States	Stephen Harper	François Hollande	Angela Merkel	Mario Monti	Yoshihiko Noda	Dmitry Medvedev	David Cameron	Barack Obama	José Manuel Barroso	Herman Van Rompuy
39th — 2013; United Kingdom	Stephen Harper	François Hollande	Angela Merkel	Enrico Letta	Shinzō Abe	Vladimir Putin	David Cameron	Barack Obama	José Manuel Barroso	Herman Van Rompuy
40th — 2014; European Union	Stephen Harper	François Hollande	Angela Merkel	Matteo Renzi	Shinzō Abe	Suspended	David Cameron	Barack Obama	José Manuel Barroso	Herman Van Rompuy
41st — 2015; Germany	Stephen Harper	François Hollande	Angela Merkel	Matteo Renzi	Shinzō Abe	Suspended	David Cameron	Barack Obama	Jean-Claude Juncker	Donald Tusk
42nd — 2016; Japan	Justin Trudeau	François Hollande	Angela Merkel	Matteo Renzi	Shinzō Abe	Suspended	David Cameron	Barack Obama	Jean-Claude Juncker	Donald Tusk
43rd — 2017; Italy	Justin Trudeau	Emmanuel Macron	Angela Merkel	Paolo Gentiloni	Shinzō Abe	Suspended	Theresa May	Donald Trump	Jean-Claude Juncker	Donald Tusk
44th — 2018; Canada	Justin Trudeau	Emmanuel Macron	Angela Merkel	Giuseppe Conte	Shinzō Abe	Suspended	Theresa May	Donald Trump	Jean-Claude Juncker	Donald Tusk
45th — 2019; France	Justin Trudeau	Emmanuel Macron	Angela Merkel	Giuseppe Conte	Shinzō Abe	Suspended	Boris Johnson	Donald Trump	Jean-Claude Juncker	Donald Tusk
46th — 2020; United States (Note: Due to the global coronavirus pandemic, the 2020 summit was cancelled.)	Justin Trudeau	Emmanuel Macron	Angela Merkel	Giuseppe Conte	Shinzō Abe	Suspended	Boris Johnson	Donald Trump	Ursula von der Leyen	Charles Michel
47th — 2021; United Kingdom	Justin Trudeau	Emmanuel Macron	Angela Merkel	Mario Draghi	Yoshihide Suga	Suspended	Boris Johnson	Joe Biden	Ursula von der Leyen	Charles Michel
48th — 2022; Germany	Justin Trudeau	Emmanuel Macron	Olaf Scholz	Mario Draghi	Fumio Kishida	Suspended	Boris Johnson	Joe Biden	Ursula von der Leyen	Charles Michel
49th — 2023; Japan	Justin Trudeau	Emmanuel Macron	Olaf Scholz	Giorgia Meloni	Fumio Kishida	Suspended	Rishi Sunak	Joe Biden	Ursula von der Leyen	Charles Michel
50th — 2024; Italy	Justin Trudeau	Emmanuel Macron	Olaf Scholz	Giorgia Meloni	Fumio Kishida	Suspended	Rishi Sunak	Joe Biden	Ursula von der Leyen	Charles Michel
51st — 2025; Canada	Mark Carney	Emmanuel Macron	Friedrich Merz	Giorgia Meloni	Shigeru Ishiba	Suspended	Keir Starmer	Donald Trump	Ursula von der Leyen	António Costa
52nd — 2026; France	Mark Carney	Emmanuel Macron	Friedrich Merz	Giorgia Meloni	Sanae Takaichi	Suspended	Keir Starmer	Donald Trump	Ursula von der Leyen	António Costa
53rd — 2027; United States	Mark Carney	TBD	Friedrich Merz	Giorgia Meloni	Sanae Takaichi	Suspended	Andy Burnham	Donald Trump	Ursula von der Leyen	TBD

== List of senior G7 leaders ==
The following is a chronology of senior G7 leaders from the founding of the G6 (a precursor organization to the G8) to the present. (Note: Canada did not join the organization until 1976, while Russia did not join until 1997. Therefore, Canadian leaders prior to 1976 and Russian leaders before 1997 are not included in this list.)

Entered office as head of state or government	Began time as senior G8 leader	Ended time as senior G8 leader	Term length	Leader	Office
16 October 1964 (Note: Wilson first served as Prime Minister of the United Kingdom from 16 October 1964 to 19 June 1970, and then again from 4 March 1974 to 5 April 1976.)	15 November 1975	5 April 1976	142 days	Harold Wilson	Prime Minister of the United Kingdom
16 May 1974	5 April 1976	27 June 1976	83 days	Helmut Schmidt	Chancellor of West Germany
20 April 1968	27 June 1976 (Note: Canada joined the organization on this date. Trudeau had been in office longer than any of the other leaders and so took the title of senior G8 leader from Schmidt.)	4 June 1979	2 years, 342 days	Pierre Trudeau	Prime Minister of Canada
16 May 1974	4 June 1979	3 March 1980	273 days	Helmut Schmidt	Chancellor of West Germany
20 April 1968 (Note: Trudeau first served as Prime Minister of Canada from 20 April 1968 to 4 June 1979, and then again from 3 March 1980 to 30 June 1984.)	3 March 1980	30 June 1984	4 years, 119 days	Pierre Trudeau	Prime Minister of Canada
4 May 1979	30 June 1984	28 November 1990	6 years, 151 days	Margaret Thatcher	Prime Minister of the United Kingdom
10 May 1981	28 November 1990	17 May 1995	4 years, 170 days	François Mitterrand	President of France
1 October 1982	17 May 1995	27 October 1998	3 years, 163 days	Helmut Kohl	Chancellor of Germany
10 July 1991	27 October 1998	31 December 1999	1 year, 65 days	Boris Yeltsin	President of Russia
20 January 1993	31 December 1999	20 January 2001	1 year, 20 days	Bill Clinton	President of the United States
4 November 1993	20 January 2001	12 December 2003	2 years, 326 days	Jean Chrétien	Prime Minister of Canada
17 May 1995	12 December 2003	16 May 2007	3 years, 155 days	Jacques Chirac	President of France
2 May 1997	16 May 2007	27 June 2007	42 days	Tony Blair	Prime Minister of the United Kingdom
7 May 2000	27 June 2007	7 May 2008	315 days	Vladimir Putin	President of Russia
20 January 2001	7 May 2008	20 January 2009	258 days	George W. Bush	President of the United States
10 May 1994 (Note: Berlusconi first served as Prime Minister of Italy from 10 May 1994 to 17 January 1995, then again from 11 June 2001 to 17 May 2006, and then again from 8 May 2008 to 16 November 2011.)	20 January 2009	16 November 2011	2 years, 300 days	Silvio Berlusconi	Prime Minister of Italy
22 November 2005	16 November 2011	7 May 2012	173 days	Angela Merkel	Chancellor of Germany
7 May 2000 (Note: Putin first served as President of Russia from 2000 to 2008.)	7 May 2012	24 March 2014	1 year, 321 days	Vladimir Putin	President of Russia
22 November 2005	24 March 2014	8 December 2021	7 years, 259 days	Angela Merkel	Chancellor of Germany
4 November 2015	8 December 2021	14 March 2025	3 years, 96 days	Justin Trudeau	Prime Minister of Canada
14 May 2017	14 March 2025	Incumbent	1 year, 128 days	Emmanuel Macron	President of France

=== List of seniority of current G7 Leaders ===
Leader	Office	In office since	Term length to date
Emmanuel Macron	President of France	14 May 2017	9 years, 67 days
Donald Trump	President of the United States	20 January 2025 (Note: Trump previously served as President of the United States from 2017 to 2021)	5 years, 181 days
Giorgia Meloni	Prime Minister of Italy	22 October 2022	3 years, 271 days
Mark Carney	Prime Minister of Canada	14 March 2025	1 year, 128 days
Friedrich Merz	Chancellor of Germany	6 May 2025	1 year, 75 days
Sanae Takaichi	Prime Minister of Japan	21 October 2025	272 days
Andy Burnham	Prime Minister of the United Kingdom	20 July 2026	0 days

== G7 tenure ==
- The longest period anyone has been the senior G7 leader is the 7 years, 259 days of Chancellor of Germany Angela Merkel, who was Chancellor for sixteen years.
- The shortest period any past G7 leader has been the senior G7 leader is the 42 days of Prime Minister of the United Kingdom Tony Blair in 2007.
- Although Japan was a founding member of the G6 (which later became the G7, and then the G8), no Japanese Prime Minister has ever become the Senior G7 Leader.
- Silvio Berlusconi currently holds the record of G8 Summit hosting, having hosted summits in Italy three times.
