= 10th G7 summit =

1984 international leader meeting in England

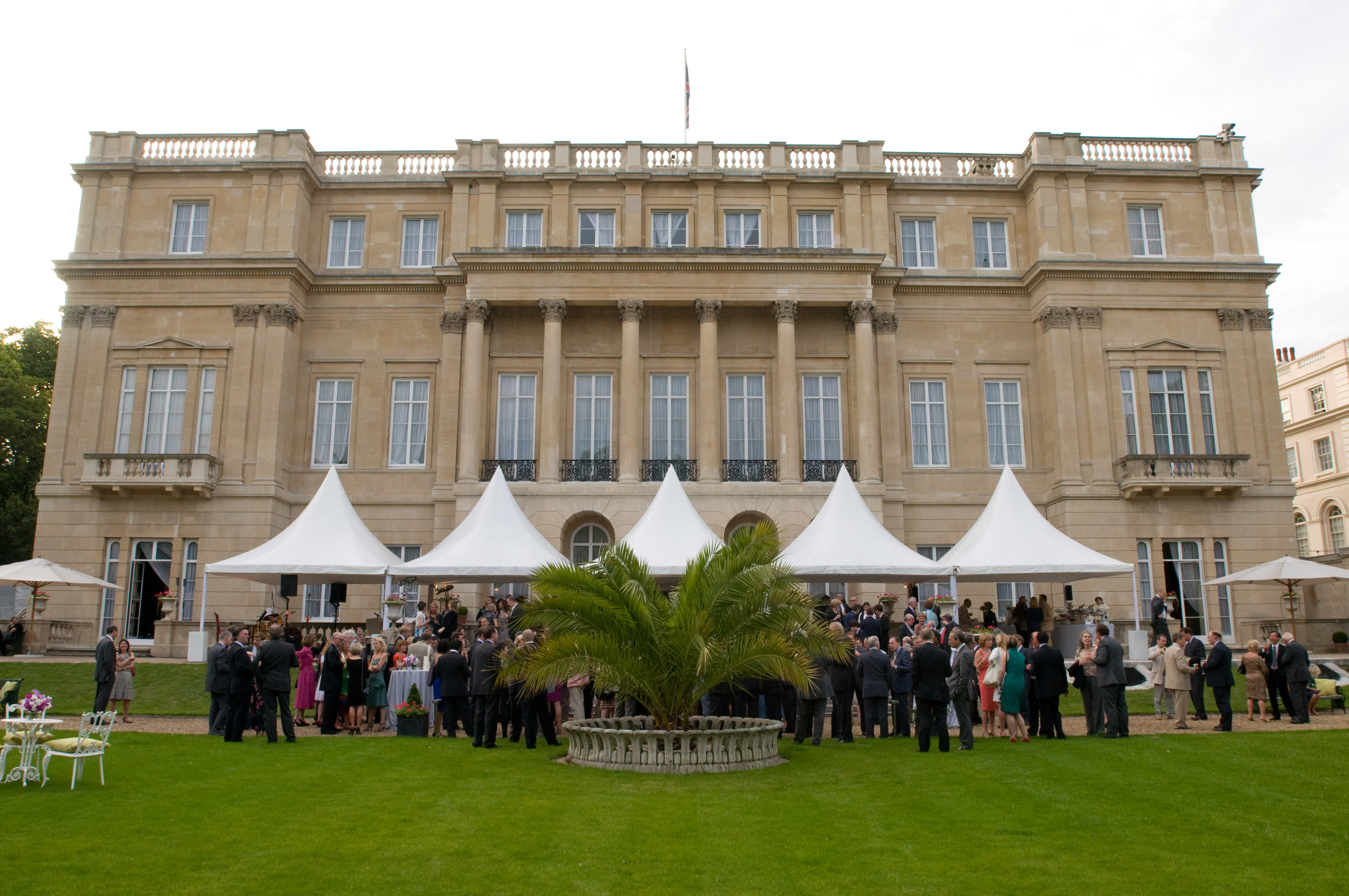
- Lancaster House in London
- Host country: United Kingdom
- Dates: 7–9 June 1984
- Cities: London, England
- Venues: Lancaster House
- Follows: 9th G7 summit
- Precedes: 11th G7 summit

The 10th G7 Summit was held in London, England, United Kingdom from 7 to 9 June 1984. The venue for the summit meetings was Lancaster House in London.

The Group of Seven (G7) was an unofficial forum which brought together the heads of the richest industrialized countries: France, West Germany, Italy, Japan, the United Kingdom, the United States, Canada (since 1976), and the President of the European Commission (starting officially in 1981). The summits were not meant to be linked formally with wider international institutions; and in fact, a mild rebellion against the stiff formality of other international meetings was a part of the genesis of cooperation between France's president Valéry Giscard d'Estaing and West Germany's chancellor Helmut Schmidt as they conceived the first Group of Six (G6) summit in 1975.

== Leaders at the summit ==
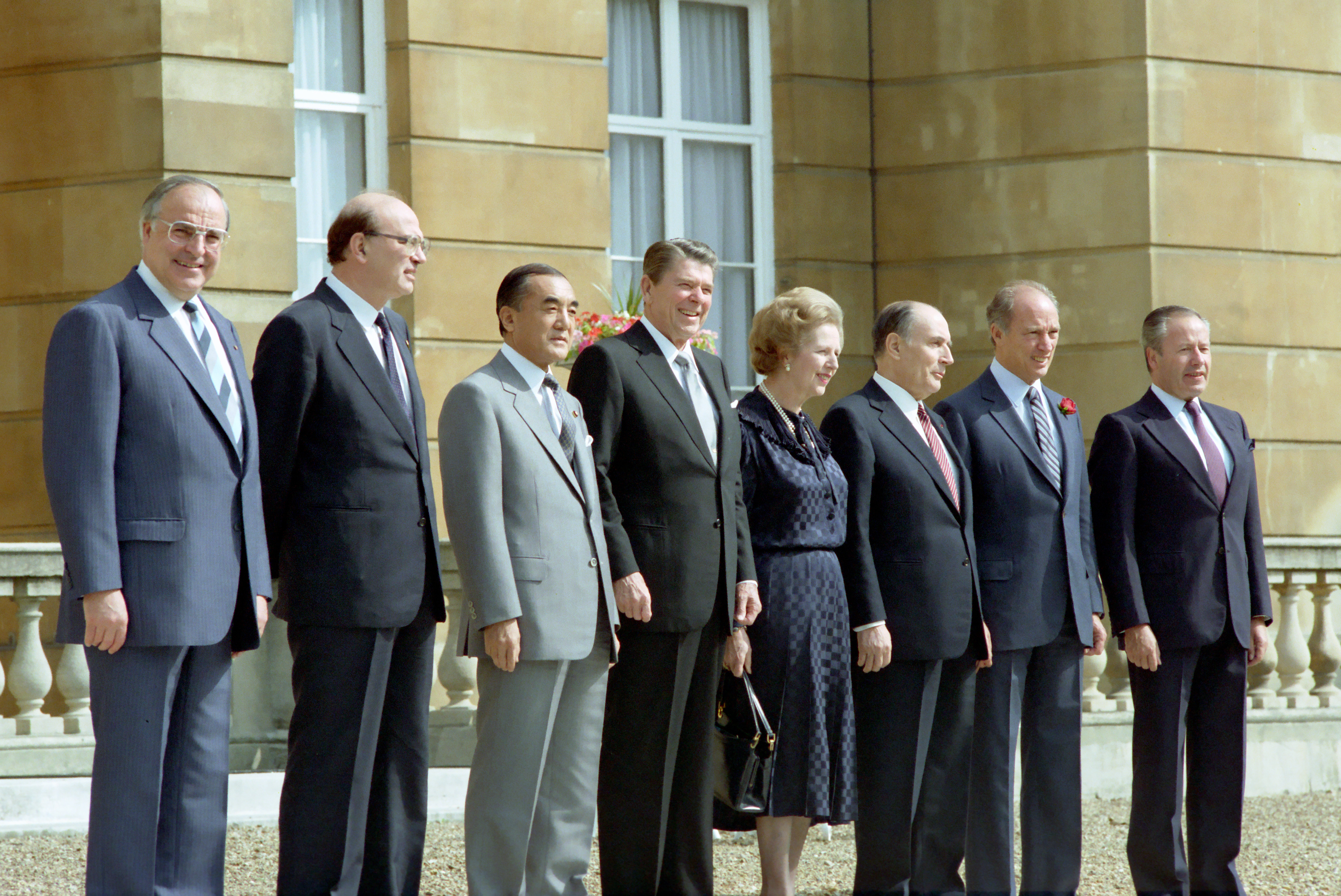
Summit leaders at Lancaster House: (left to right) Helmut Kohl, Bettino Craxi, Yasuhiro Nakasone, Ronald Reagan, Margaret Thatcher, François Mitterrand, Pierre Trudeau, and Gaston Thorn

The G7 is an unofficial annual forum for the leaders of Canada, the European Commission, France, Germany, Italy, Japan, the United Kingdom and the United States.

The 10th G7 summit was the first summit for Italian Prime Minister Bettino Craxi. It was also the last summit for Canadian Prime Minister Pierre Trudeau.

=== Participants ===
These summit participants are the current "core members" of the international forum:

**Core G7 members** Host state and leader are shown in bold text.
Member		Represented by	Title
(Canada)	Canada	Pierre Trudeau	Prime Minister
(France)	France	François Mitterrand	President
(West Germany)	West Germany	Helmut Kohl	Chancellor
(Italy)	Italy	Bettino Craxi	Prime Minister
(Japan)	Japan	Yasuhiro Nakasone	Prime Minister
(United Kingdom)	**United Kingdom**	**Margaret Thatcher**	**Prime Minister**
(United States)	United States	Ronald Reagan	President
(European Union)	European Community	Gaston Thorn	Commission President
(European Union)	European Community	François Mitterrand	Council President

== Issues ==
Joint Statement
Prime Minister Margaret Thatcher delivers a joint statement on behalf of the summit, 9 June 1984

The summit was intended as a venue for resolving differences among its members. As a practical matter, the summit was also conceived as an opportunity for its members to give each other mutual encouragement in the face of difficult economic decisions. Issues which were discussed at this summit included:

- economic problems, prospects, and opportunities for countries and for the world
- world recession
- enduring growth and the creation of new jobs
- growing strain of public expenditure
- unemployment
- political and economic challenges for developing countries
- debt burdens of developing countries and role for the International Monetary Fund (IMF)
- policies to reduce inflation and interest rates
- control monetary growth and reduce budgetary deficits
- business innovations
- labour issues and opportunities
- economic stability and management
- development assistance and assistance through the international financial and development institutions to the developing countries
- third world debt
- trade liberalization
- poverty and drought
- oil and the Persian Gulf
- the Eastern Bloc
- job creation innovations in Italy
- the environment
- crewed space stations

== Gallery of participating leaders ==
=== Core G7 participants ===
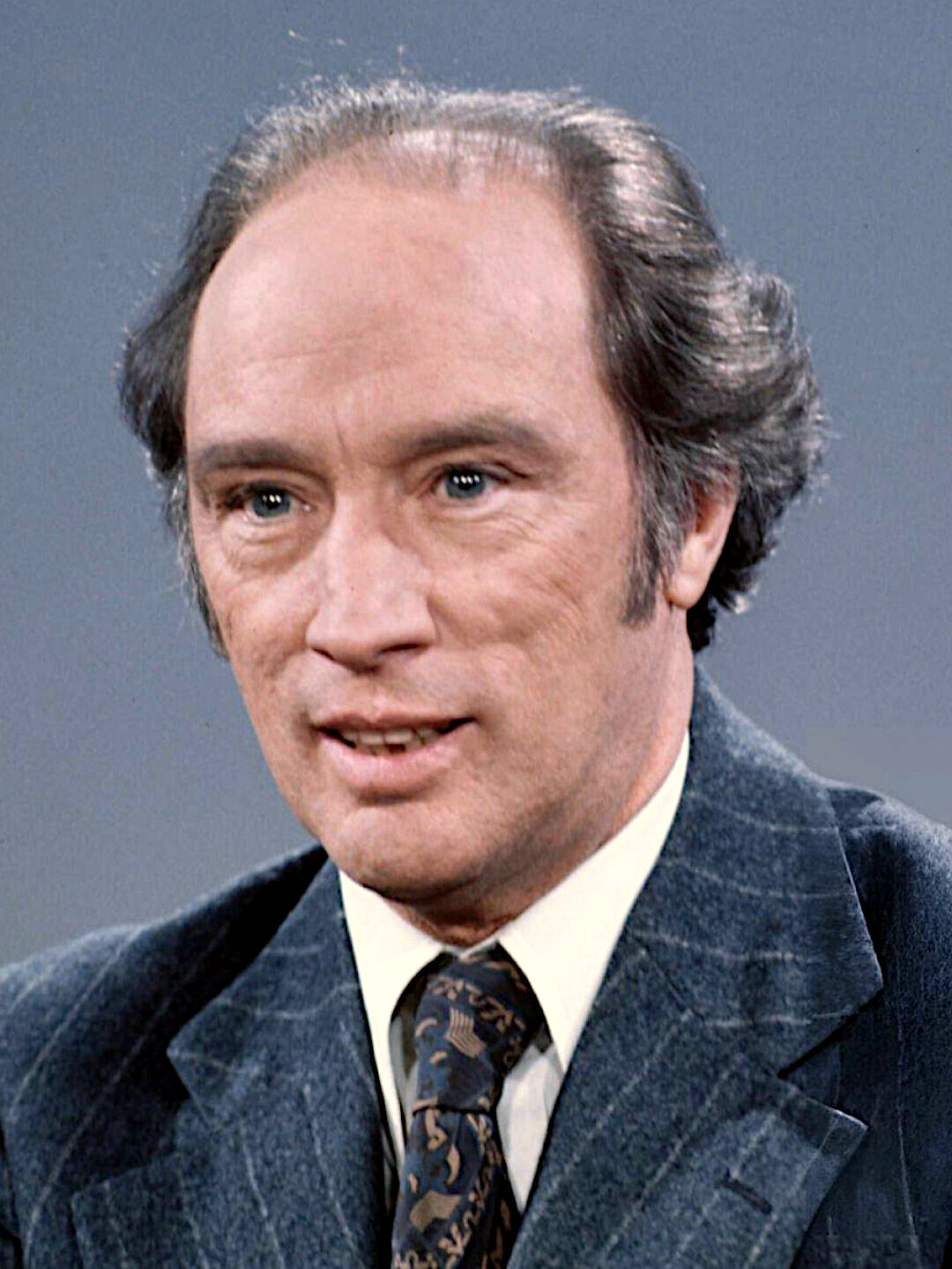
(Canada) Canada
Pierre Trudeau,
Prime Minister

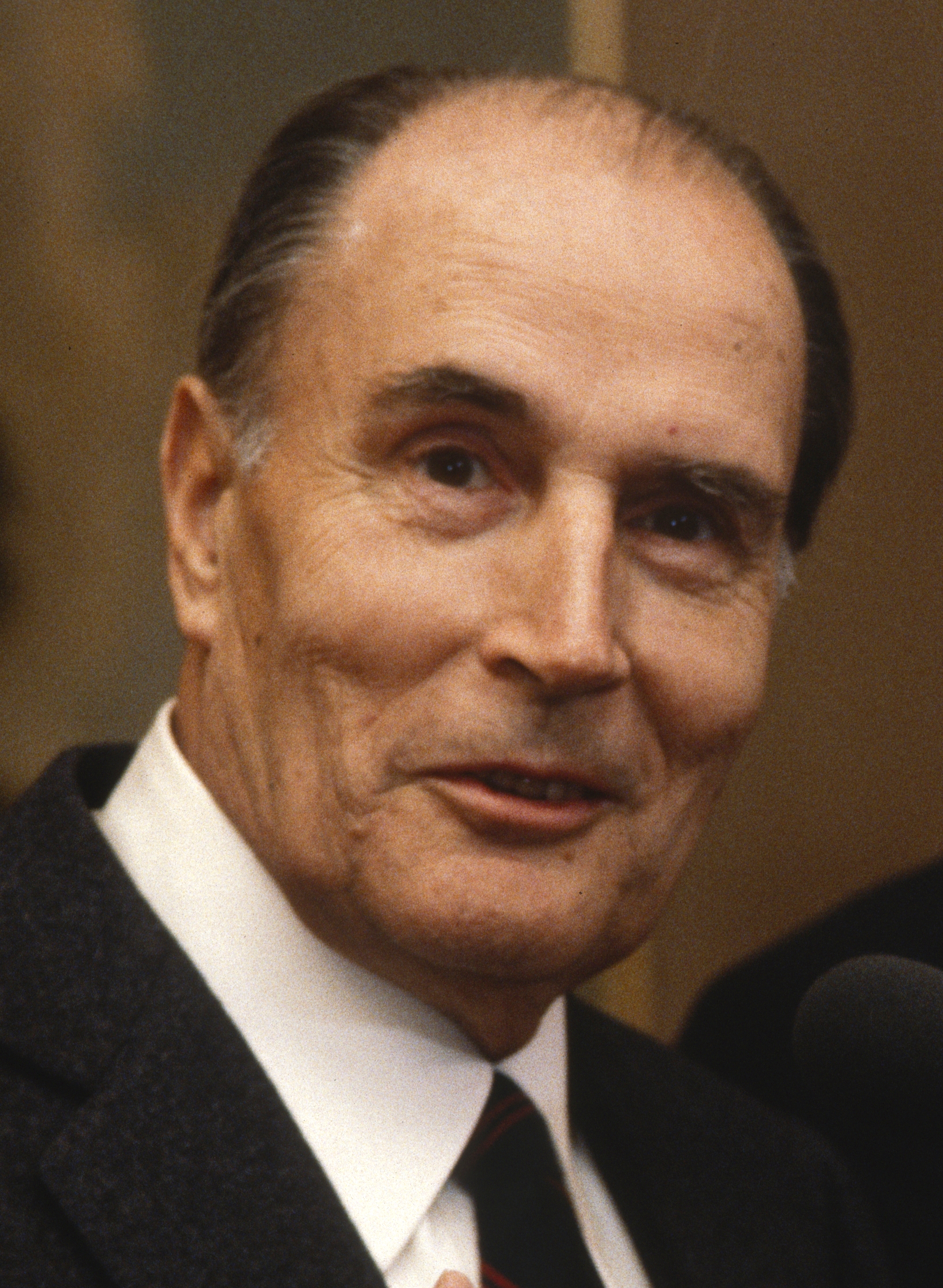
(France) France
François Mitterrand,
President

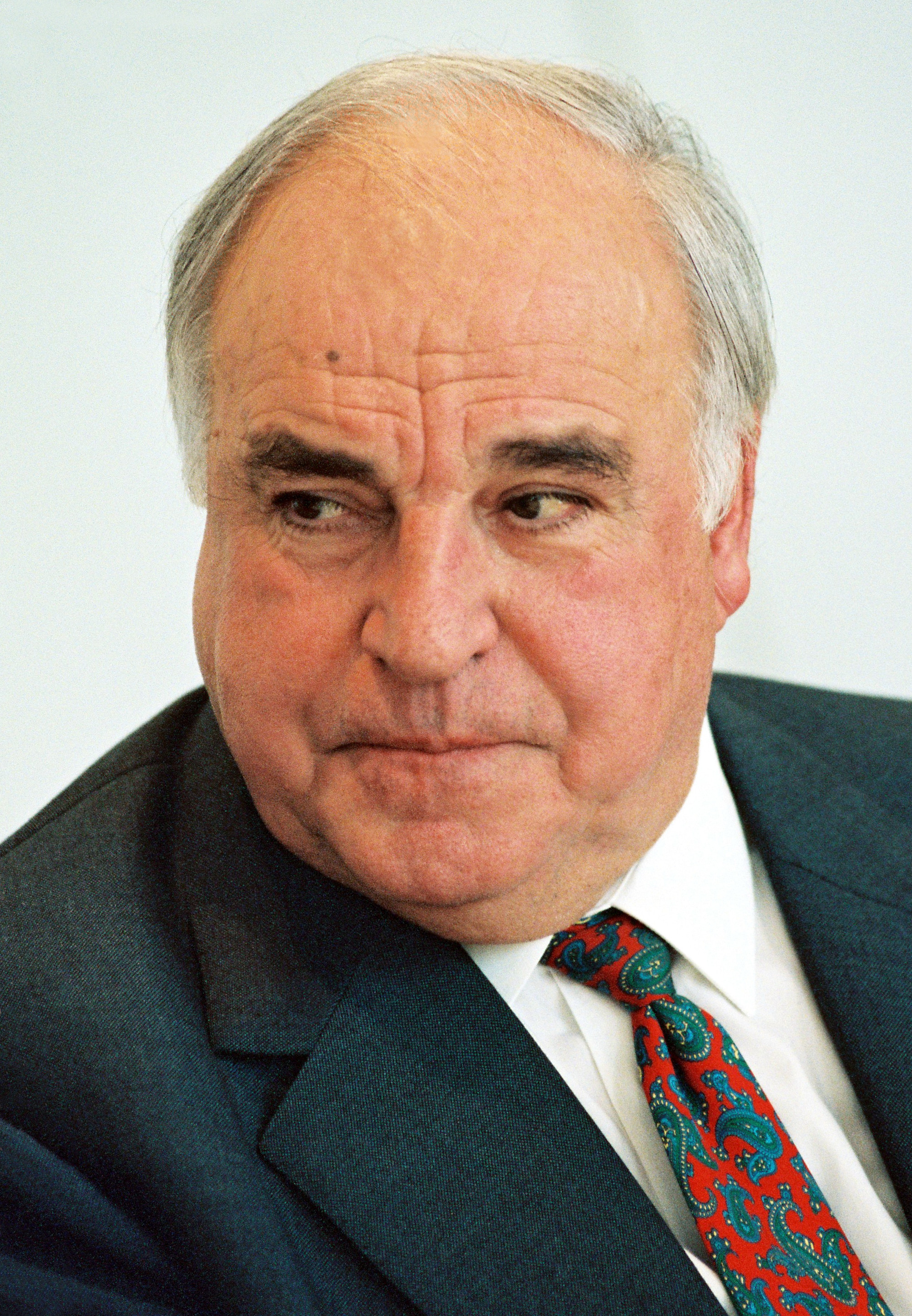
(Germany) Germany
Helmut Kohl,
Chancellor

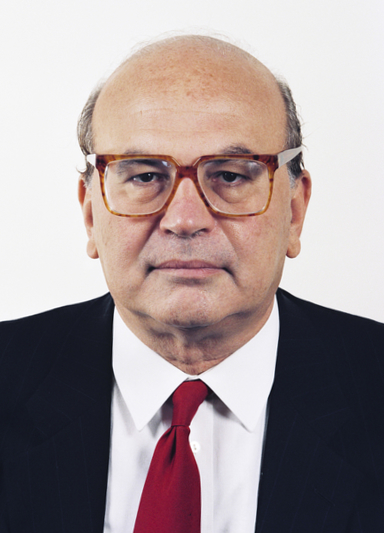
(Italy) Italy
Bettino Craxi,
Prime Minister

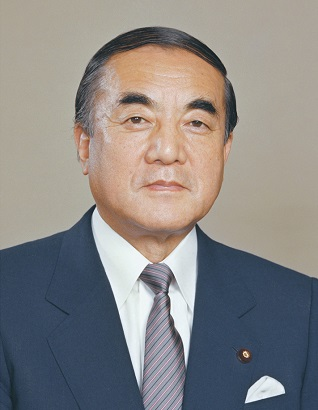
(Japan) Japan
Yasuhiro Nakasone,
Prime Minister

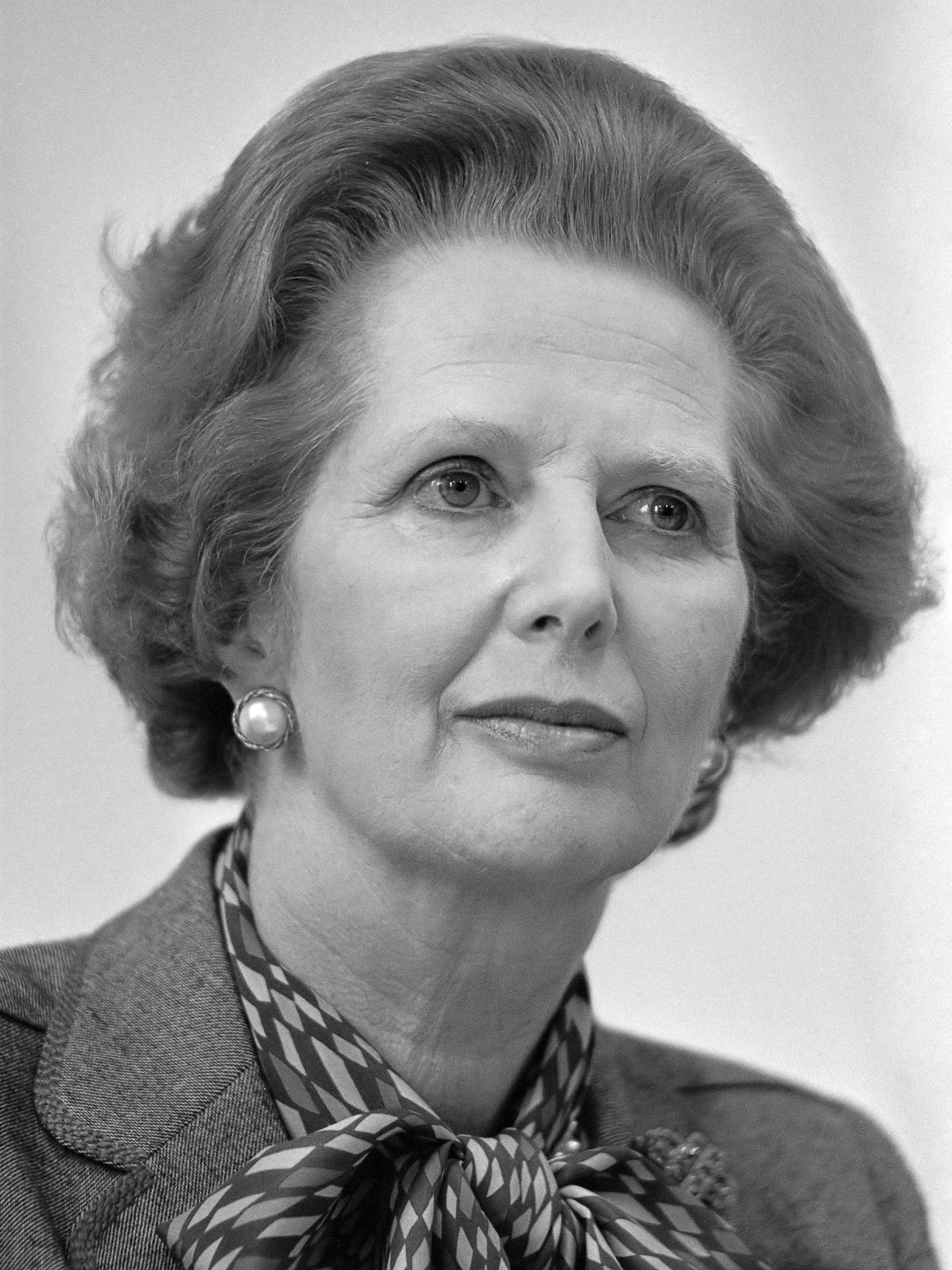
(United Kingdom) United Kingdom
Margaret Thatcher,
Prime Minister (Host)

(United States) United States
Ronald Reagan,
President
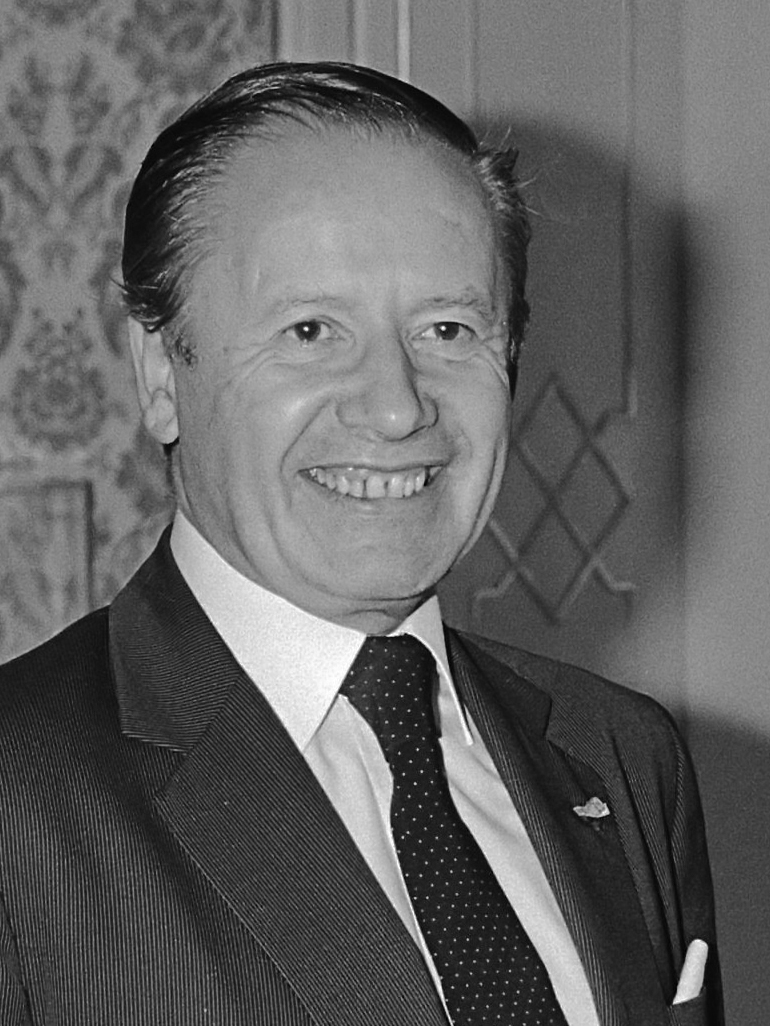
(European Union) European Commission
Gaston Thorn,
President

== See also ==
- G8
