= 11th G7 summit =

1985 international leader meeting in Germany

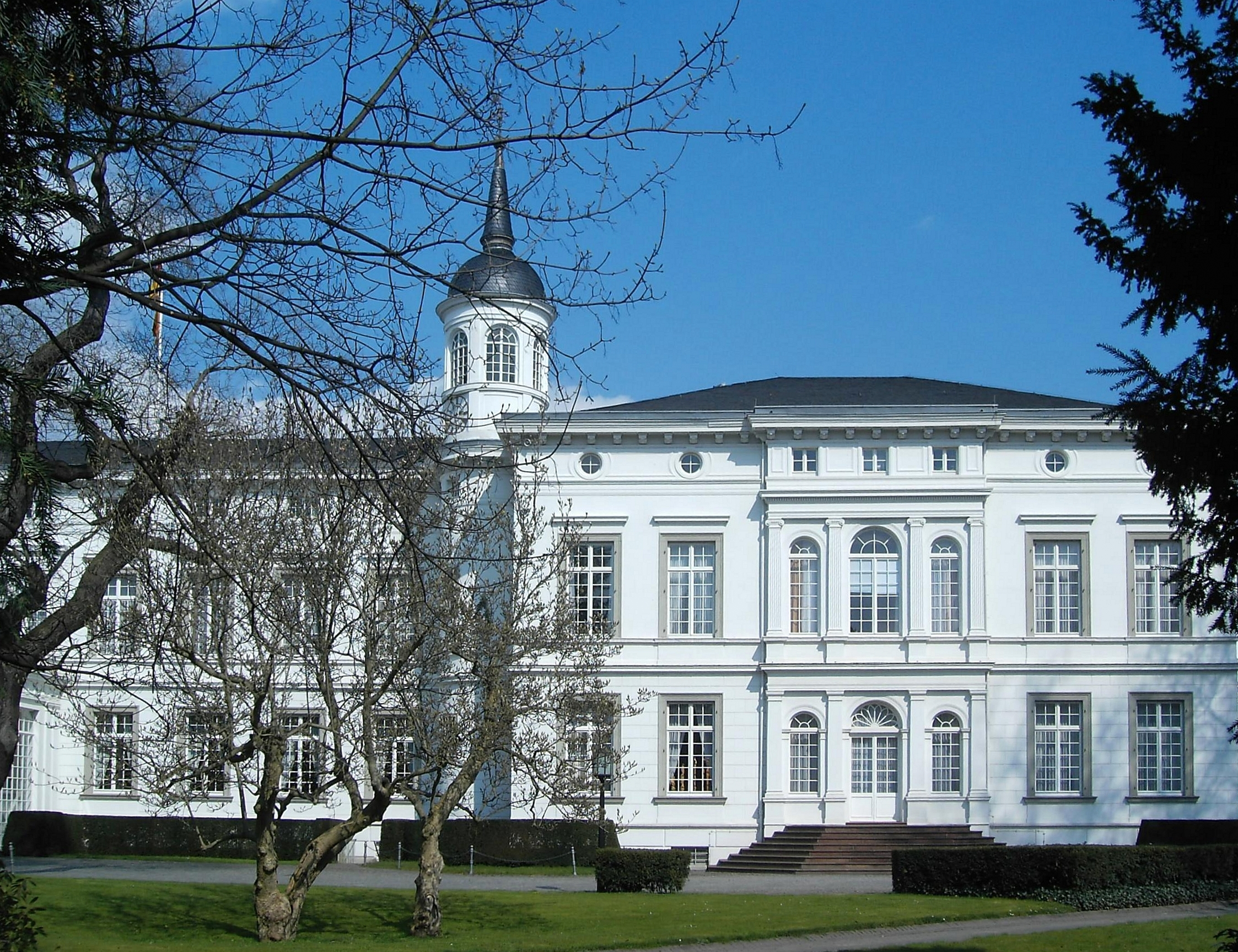
- Schaumburg Palace in Bonn
- Host country: West Germany
- Dates: 2–4 May 1985
- Cities: Bonn, North Rhine-Westphalia
- Venues: Palais Schaumburg
- Follows: 10th G7 summit
- Precedes: 12th G7 summit

The 11th G7 Summit was held in Bonn, West Germany between 2 and 4 May 1985. The venue for the summit meeting was at the former official residence of the Chancellor of the Federal Republic of Germany in Bonn, the Palais Schaumburg.

The Group of Seven (G7) was an unofficial forum which brought together the heads of the richest industrialized countries: France, West Germany, Italy, Japan, the United Kingdom, the United States, Canada (since 1976), and the President of the European Commission (starting officially in 1981). The summits were not meant to be linked formally with wider international institutions; and in fact, a mild rebellion against the stiff formality of other international meetings was a part of the genesis of cooperation between France's president Valéry Giscard d'Estaing and West Germany's chancellor Helmut Schmidt as they conceived the first Group of Six (G6) summit in 1975.

== Leaders at the summit ==
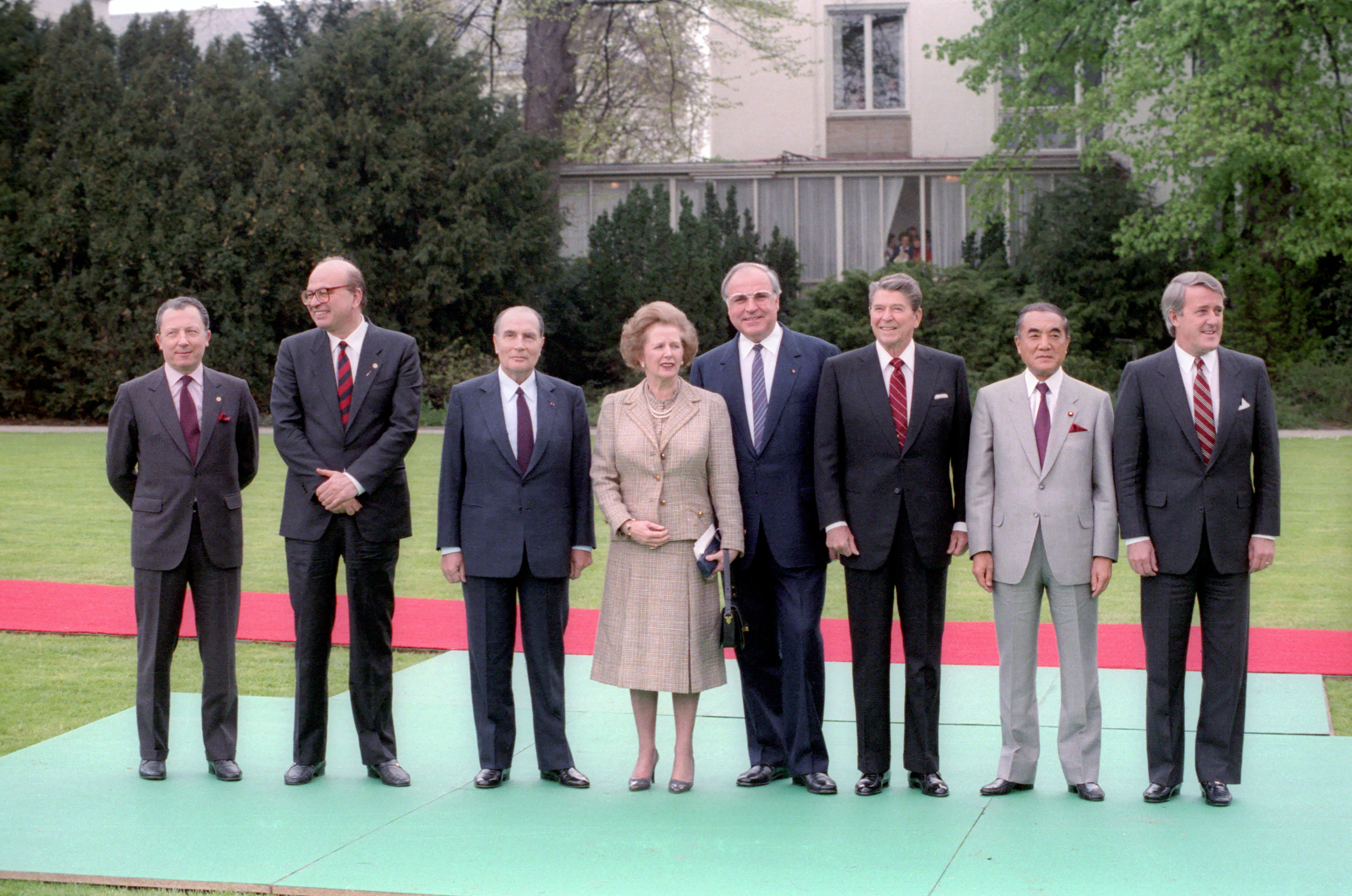
Summit leaders at the Palais Schaumburg: (left to right) Jacques Delors, Bettino Craxi, François Mitterrand, Margaret Thatcher, Helmut Kohl, Ronald Reagan, Yasuhiro Nakasone, and Brian Mulroney

The G7 is an unofficial annual forum for the leaders of Canada, the European Commission, France, Germany, Italy, Japan, the United Kingdom and the United States.

The 11th G7 summit was the first summit for Canadian Prime Minister Brian Mulroney.

=== Participants ===
These summit participants are the current "core members" of the international forum:

**Core G7 members** Host state and leader are shown in bold text.
Member		Represented by	Title
(Canada)	Canada	Brian Mulroney	Prime Minister
(France)	France	François Mitterrand	President
(West Germany)	**West Germany**	**Helmut Kohl**	**Chancellor**
(Italy)	Italy	Bettino Craxi	Prime Minister
(Japan)	Japan	Yasuhiro Nakasone	Prime Minister
(United Kingdom)	United Kingdom	Margaret Thatcher	Prime Minister
(United States)	United States	Ronald Reagan	President
(European Union)	European Community	Jacques Delors	Commission President
(European Union)	European Community	Bettino Craxi	Council President

== Issues ==
The summit was intended as a venue for resolving differences among its members. As a practical matter, the summit was also conceived as an opportunity for its members to give each other mutual encouragement in the face of difficult economic decisions. Issues which were discussed at this summit included:

- Growth and Employment
- Relations with Developing Countries
- Multilateral Trading System and International Monetary System
- Environment Policies
- Cooperation in Science and Technology

== Gallery of participating leaders ==
=== Core G7 participants ===
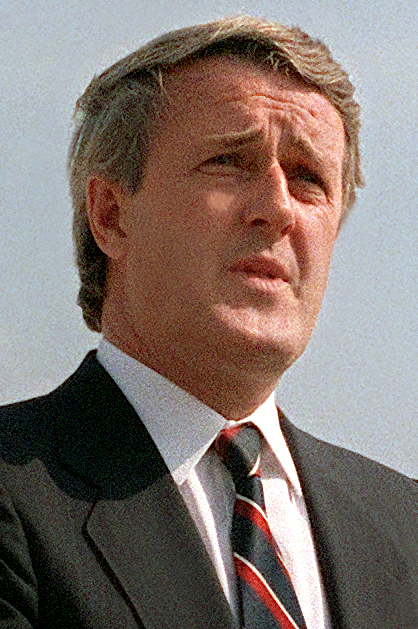
(Canada) Canada
Brian Mulroney,
Prime Minister

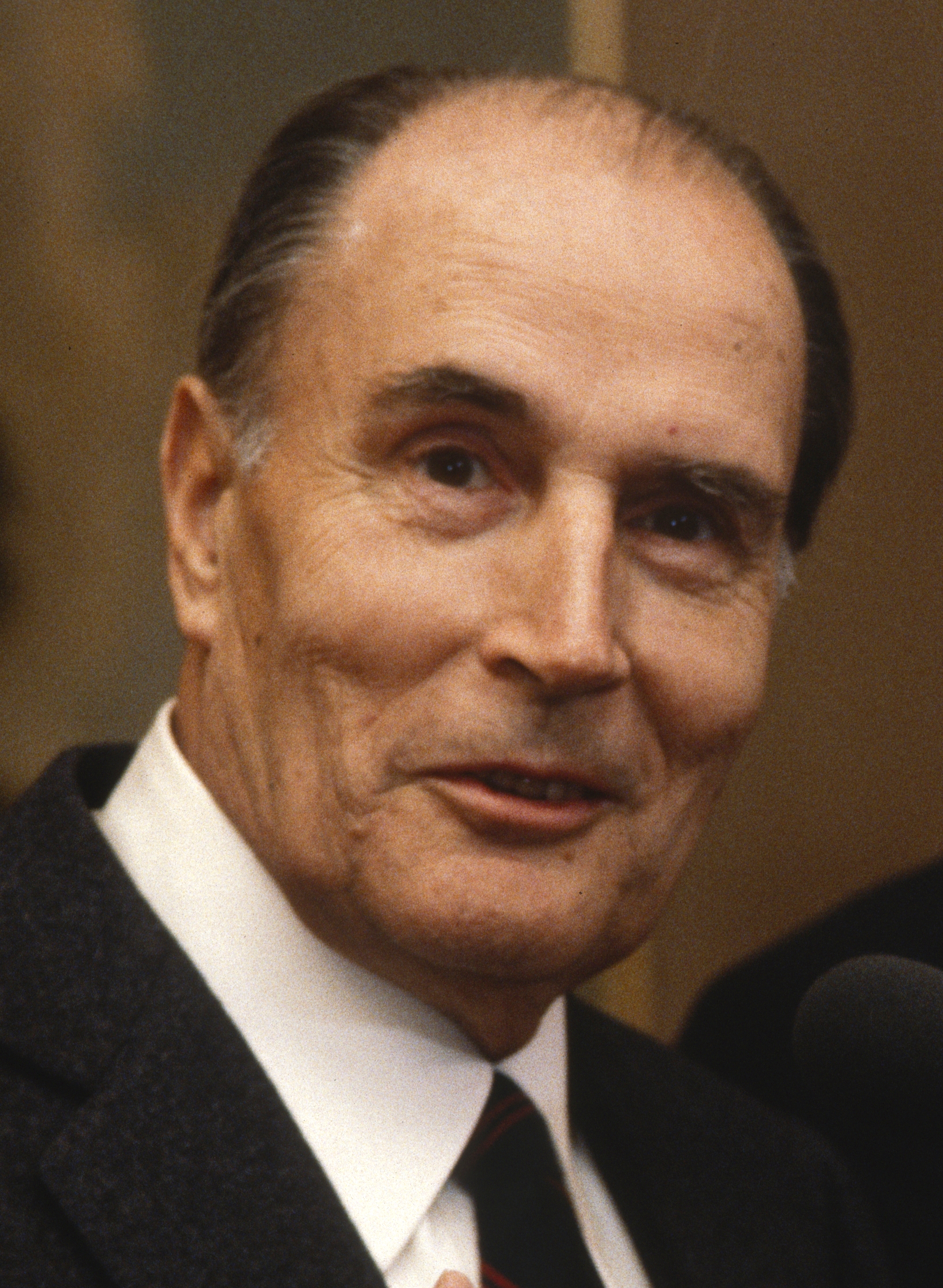
(France) France
François Mitterrand,
President

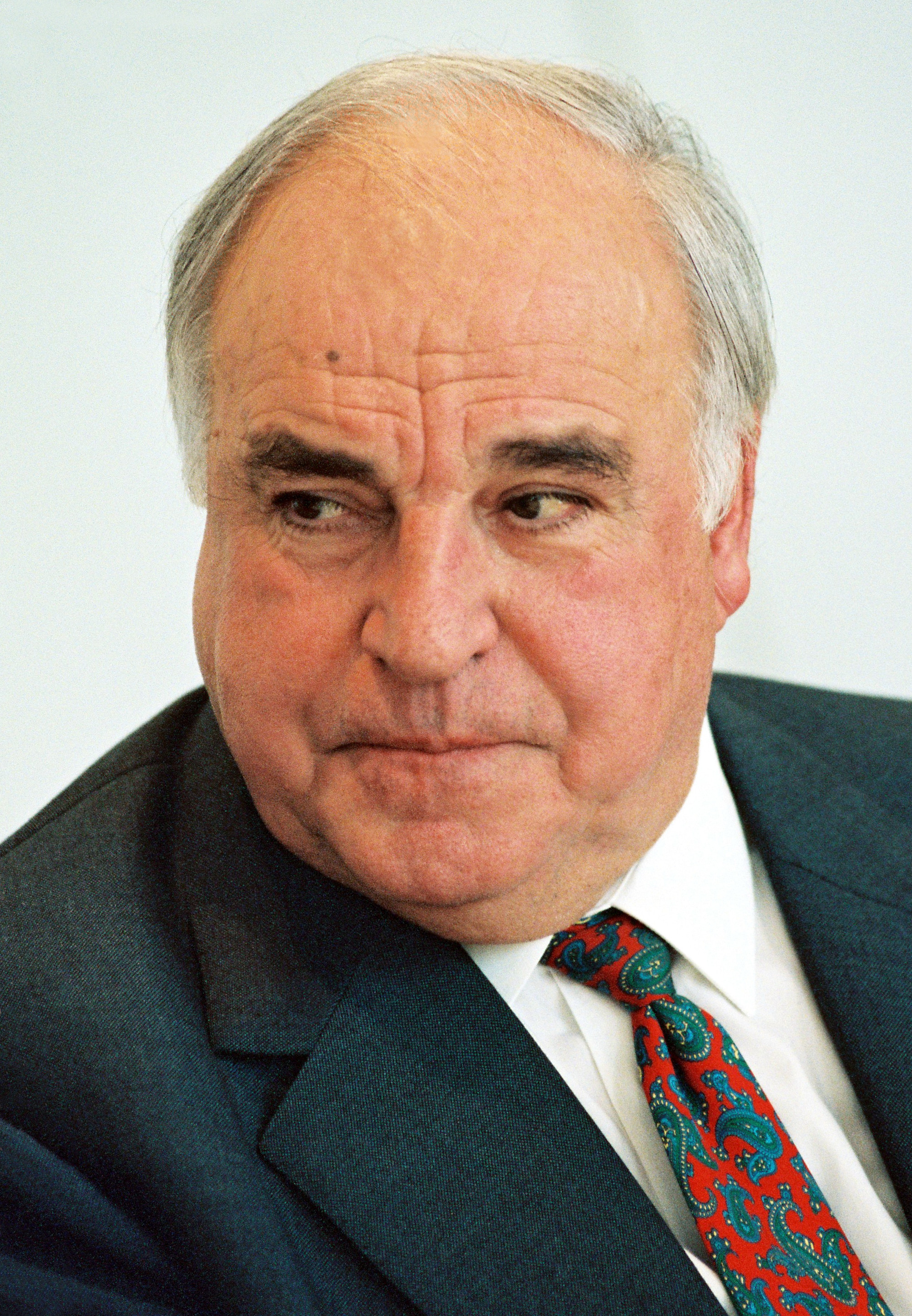
(Germany) Germany
Helmut Kohl,
Chancellor (Host)

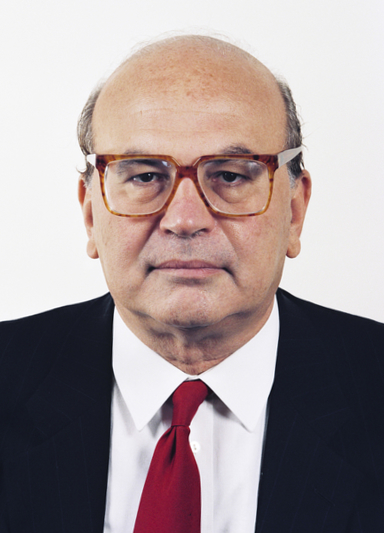
(Italy) Italy
Bettino Craxi,
Prime Minister

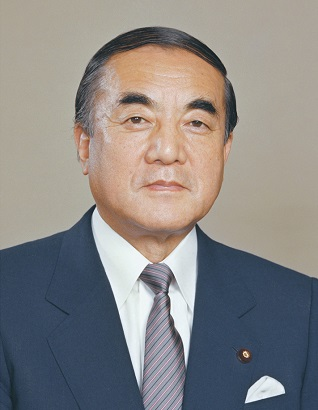
(Japan) Japan
Yasuhiro Nakasone,
Prime Minister

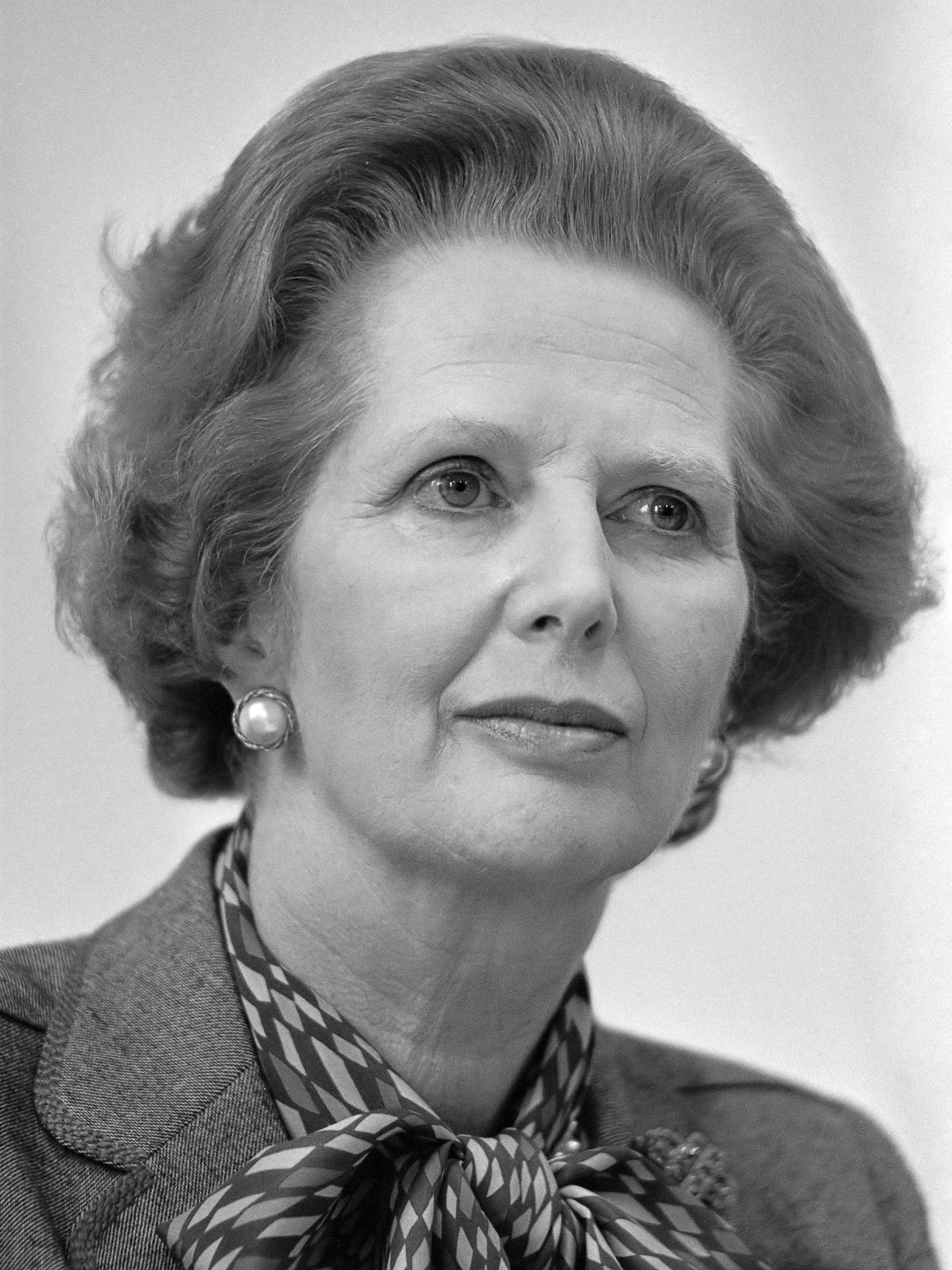
(United Kingdom) United Kingdom
Margaret Thatcher,
Prime Minister

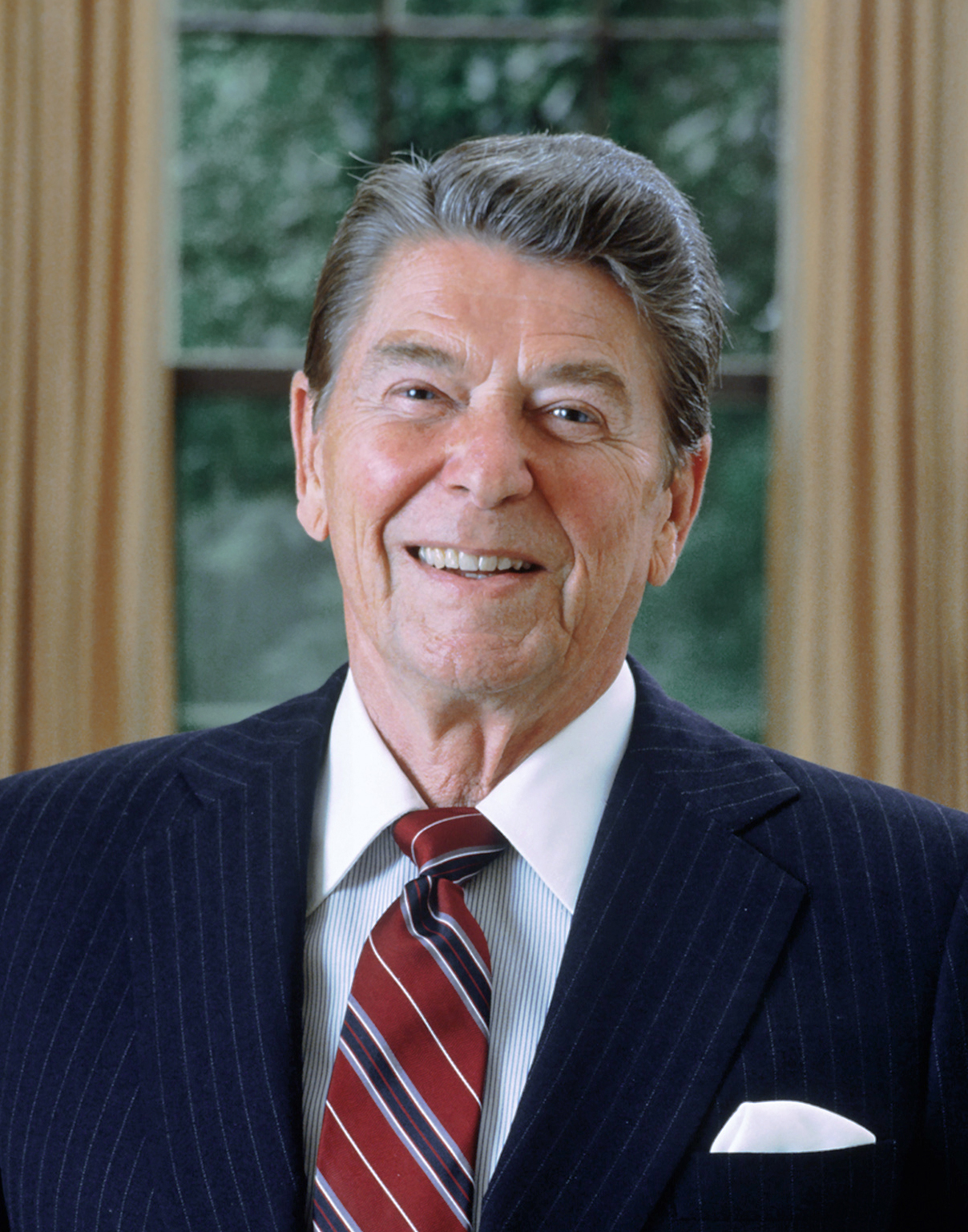
(United States) United States
Ronald Reagan,
President'
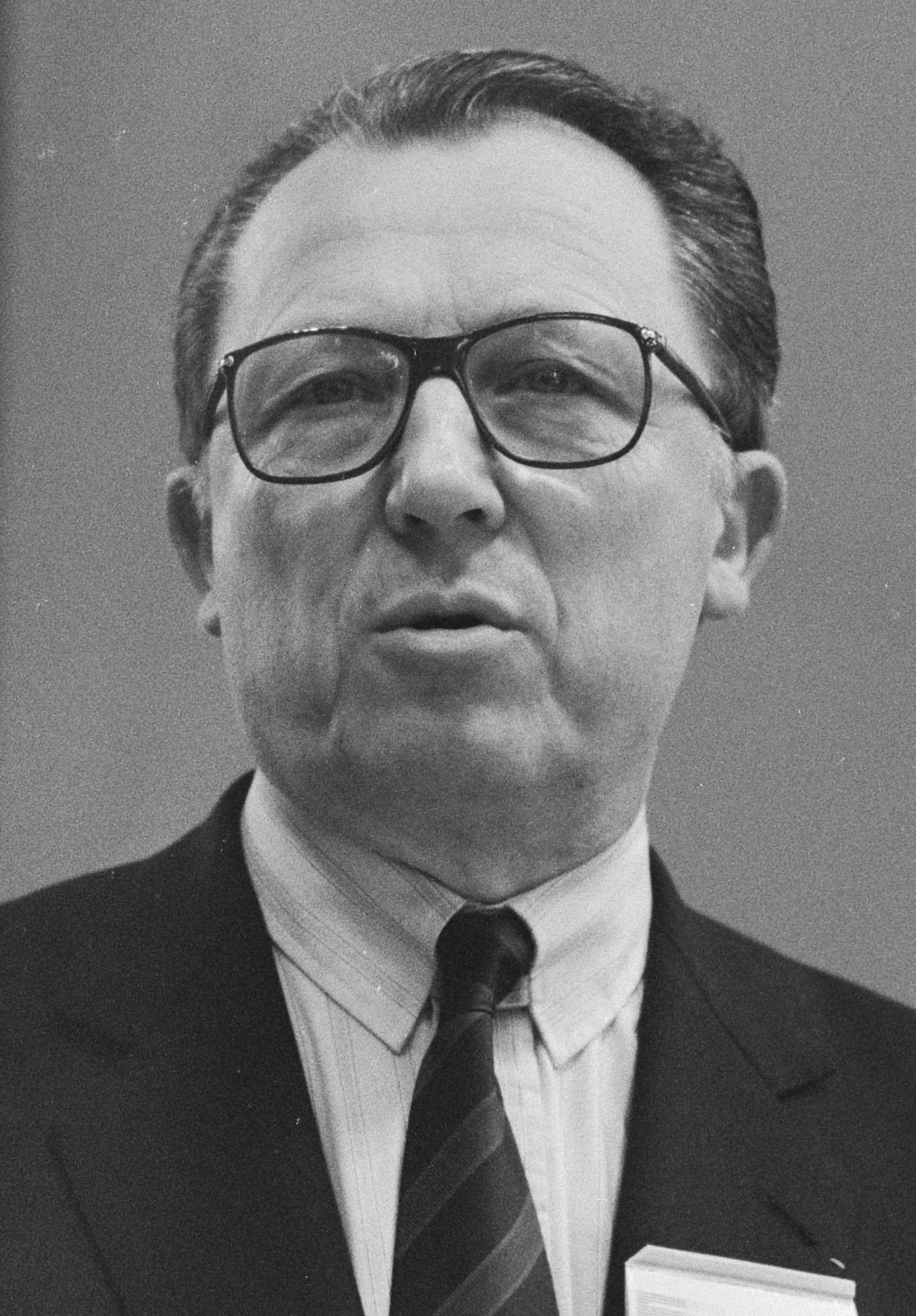
(European Union) European Union
Jacques Delors,
Commission President

== See also ==
- G8
