= 13th G7 summit =

1987 international leader meeting in Italy

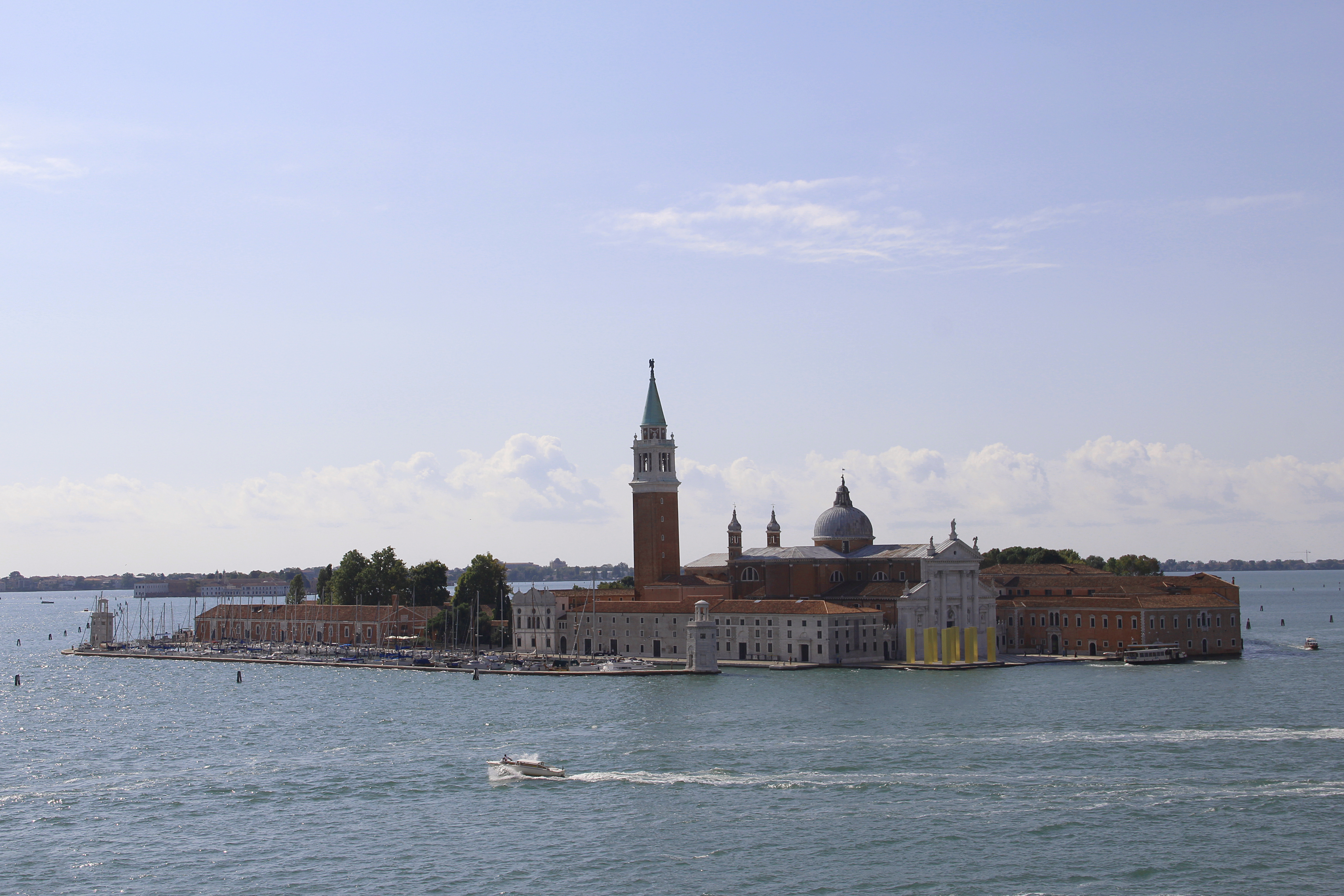
- San Giorgio Maggiore in Venice
- Host country: Italy
- Dates: 8–10 June 1987
- Cities: Venice, Veneto
- Venues: Giorgio Cini Foundation
- Follows: 12th G7 summit
- Precedes: 14th G7 summit

The 13th G7 Summit was held in Venice, Italy between 8 and 10 June 1987. The venue for the summit meetings was the island of San Giorgio Maggiore in the Venetian lagoon.

The Group of Seven (G7) was an unofficial forum which brought together the heads of the richest industrialized countries: France, West Germany, Italy, Japan, the United Kingdom, the United States, Canada (since 1976), and the President of the European Commission (starting officially in 1981). The summits were not meant to be linked formally with wider international institutions; and in fact, a mild rebellion against the stiff formality of other international meetings was a part of the genesis of cooperation between France's president Valéry Giscard d'Estaing and West Germany's chancellor Helmut Schmidt as they conceived the first Group of Six (G6) summit in 1975.

== Leaders at the summit ==
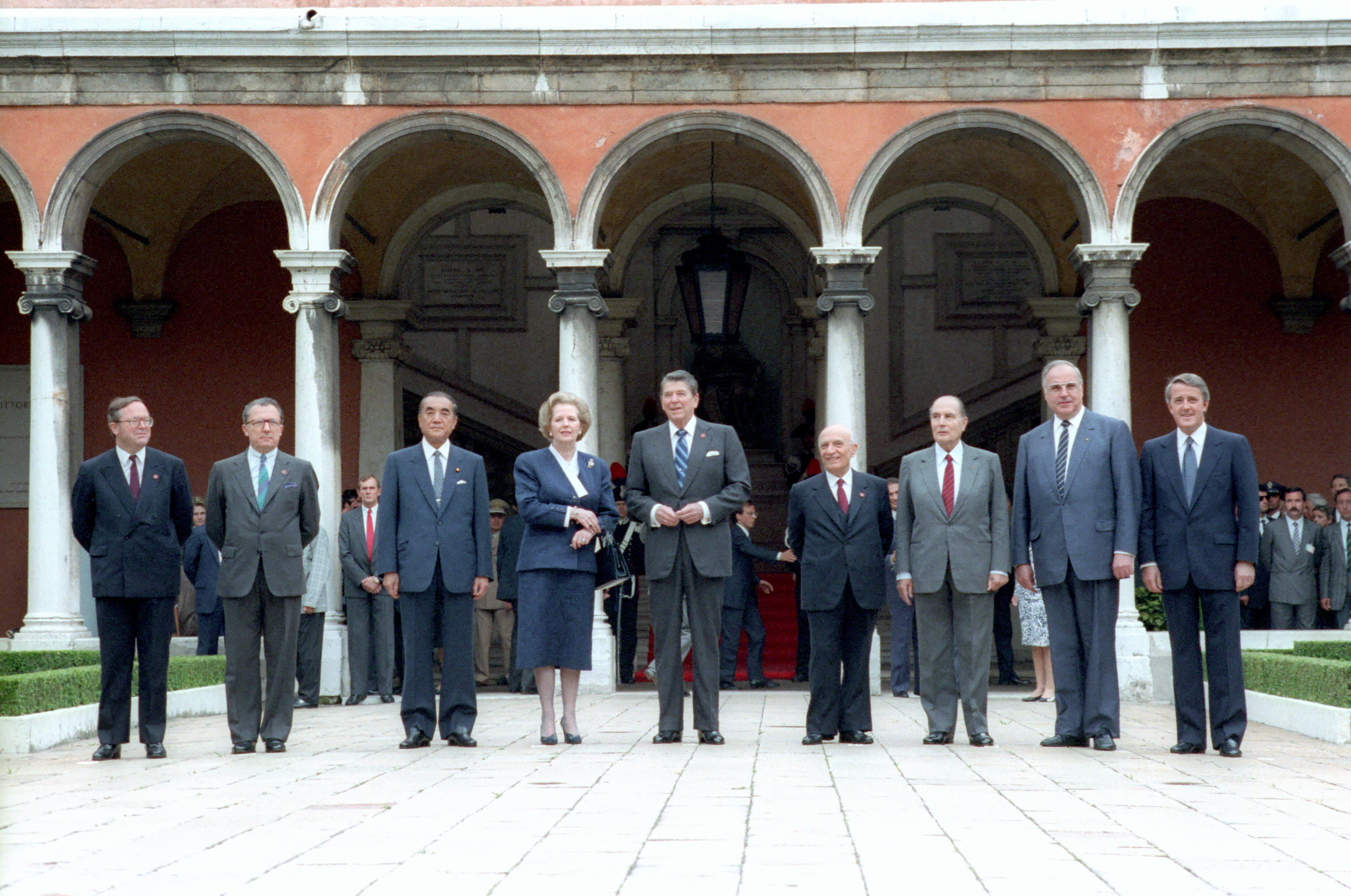
Summit leaders at the Giorgio Cini Foundation: (left to right) Wilfried Martens, Jacques Delors, Yasuhiro Nakasone, Margaret Thatcher, Ronald Reagan, Amintore Fanfani, François Mitterrand, Helmut Kohl, and Brian Mulroney

The G7 is an unofficial annual forum for the leaders of Canada, the European Commission, France, Germany, Italy, Japan, the United Kingdom, and the United States.

The 13th G7 summit was the last summit for Italian Prime Minister Amintore Fanfani and Japanese Prime Minister Yasuhiro Nakasone.

=== Participants ===
These summit participants are the current "core members" of the international forum:

**Core G7 members** Host state and leader are shown in bold text.
Member		Represented by	Title
(Canada)	Canada	Brian Mulroney	Prime Minister
(France)	France	François Mitterrand	President
(West Germany)	West Germany	Helmut Kohl	Chancellor
(Italy)	**Italy**	**Amintore Fanfani**	**Prime Minister**
(Japan)	Japan	Yasuhiro Nakasone	Prime Minister
(United Kingdom)	United Kingdom	Margaret Thatcher	Prime Minister
(United States)	United States	Ronald Reagan	President
(European Union)	European Community	Jacques Delors	Commission President
(European Union)	European Community	Wilfried Martens	Council President

== Issues ==
The summit was intended as a venue for resolving differences among its members. As a practical matter, the summit was also conceived as an opportunity for its members to give each other mutual encouragement in the face of difficult economic decisions.

== Gallery of participating leaders ==
=== Core G7 participants ===
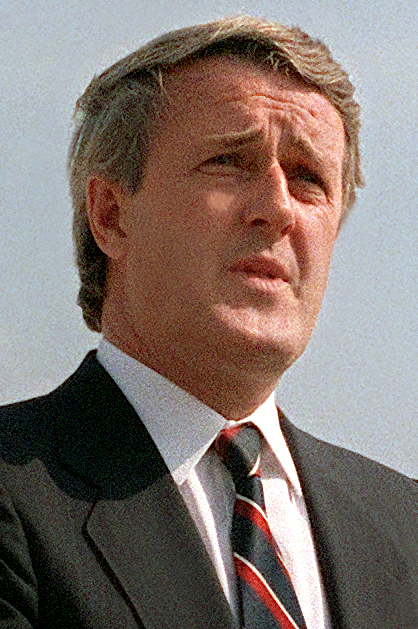
(Canada) Canada
Brian Mulroney,
Prime Minister

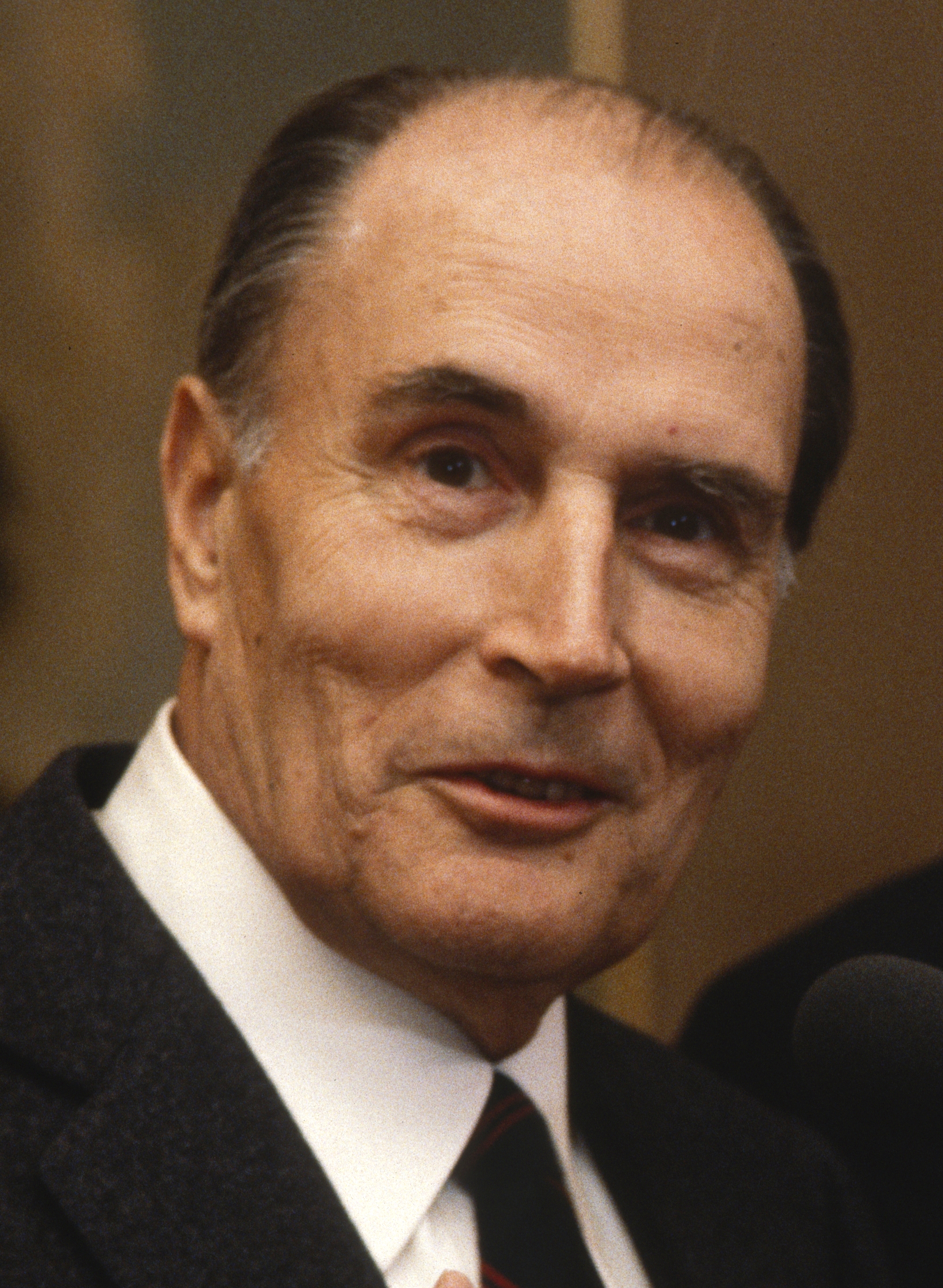
(France) France
François Mitterrand,
President

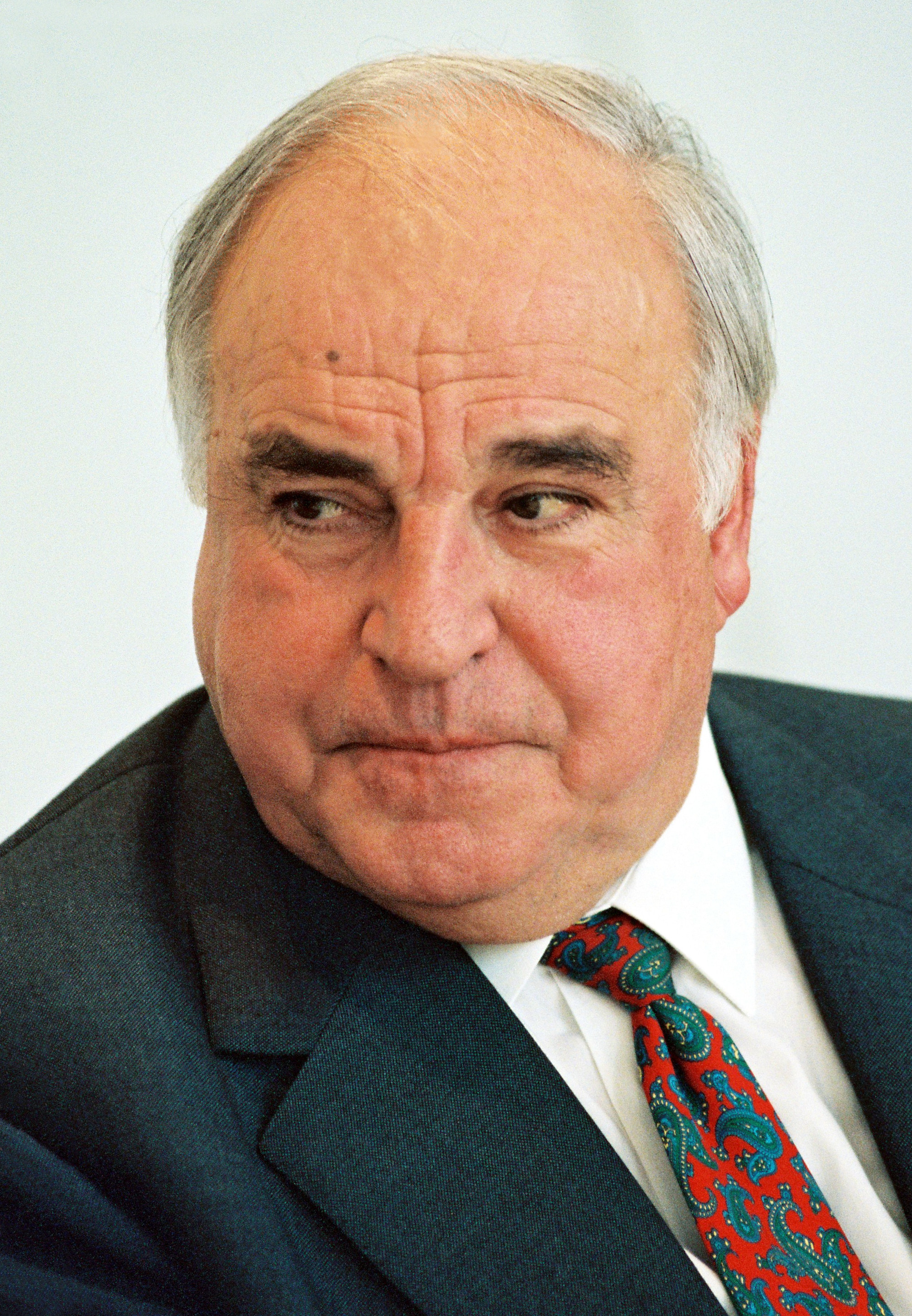
(Germany) Germany
Helmut Kohl,
Chancellor

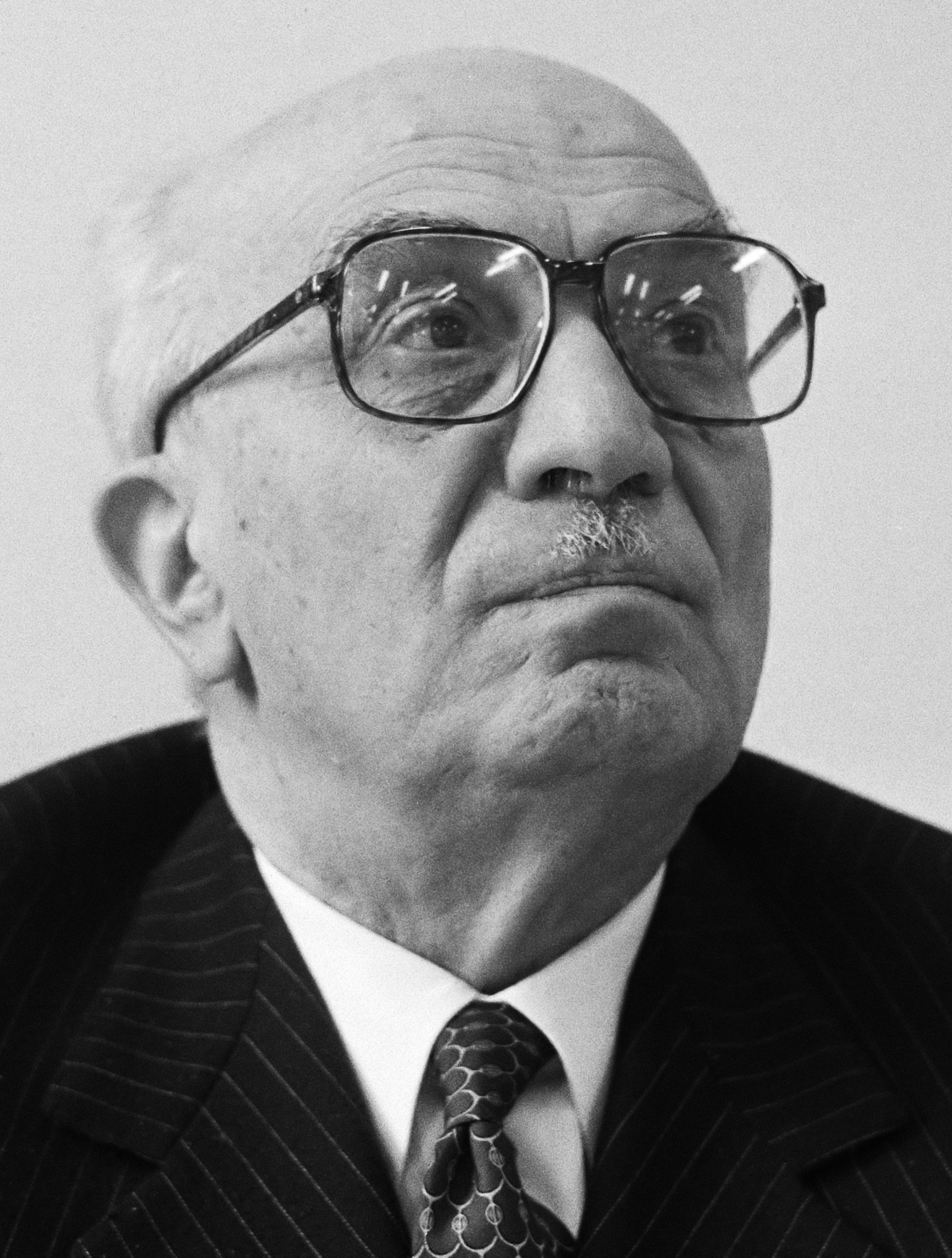
(Italy) Italy
Amintore Fanfani,
Prime Minister (Host)

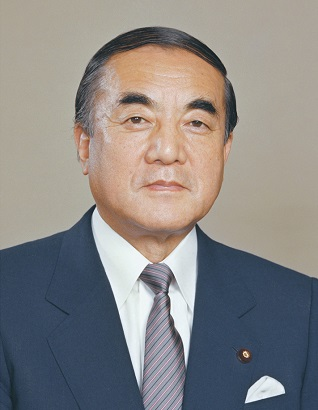
(Japan) Japan
Yasuhiro Nakasone,
Prime Minister

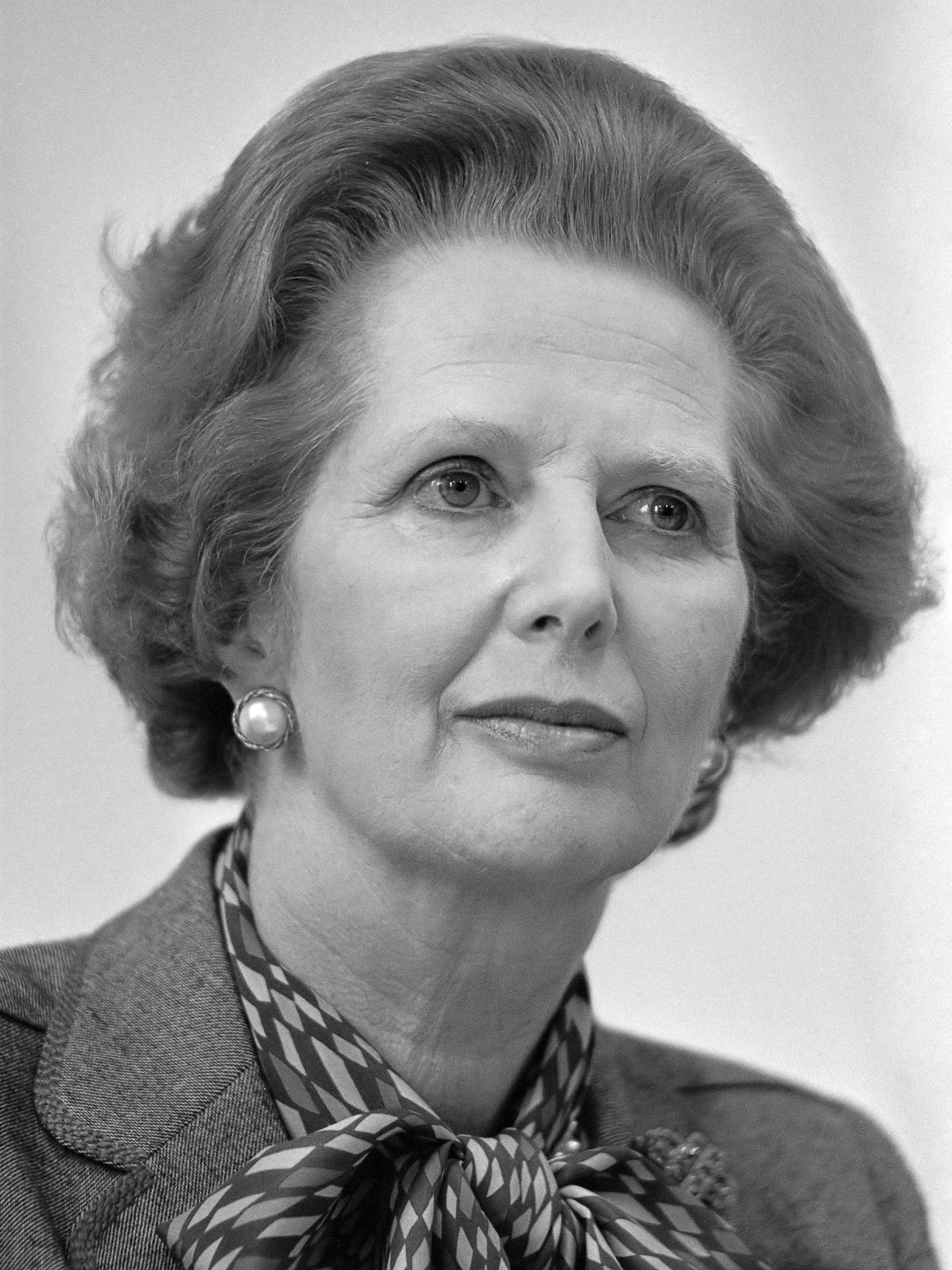
(United Kingdom) United Kingdom
Margaret Thatcher,
Prime Minister

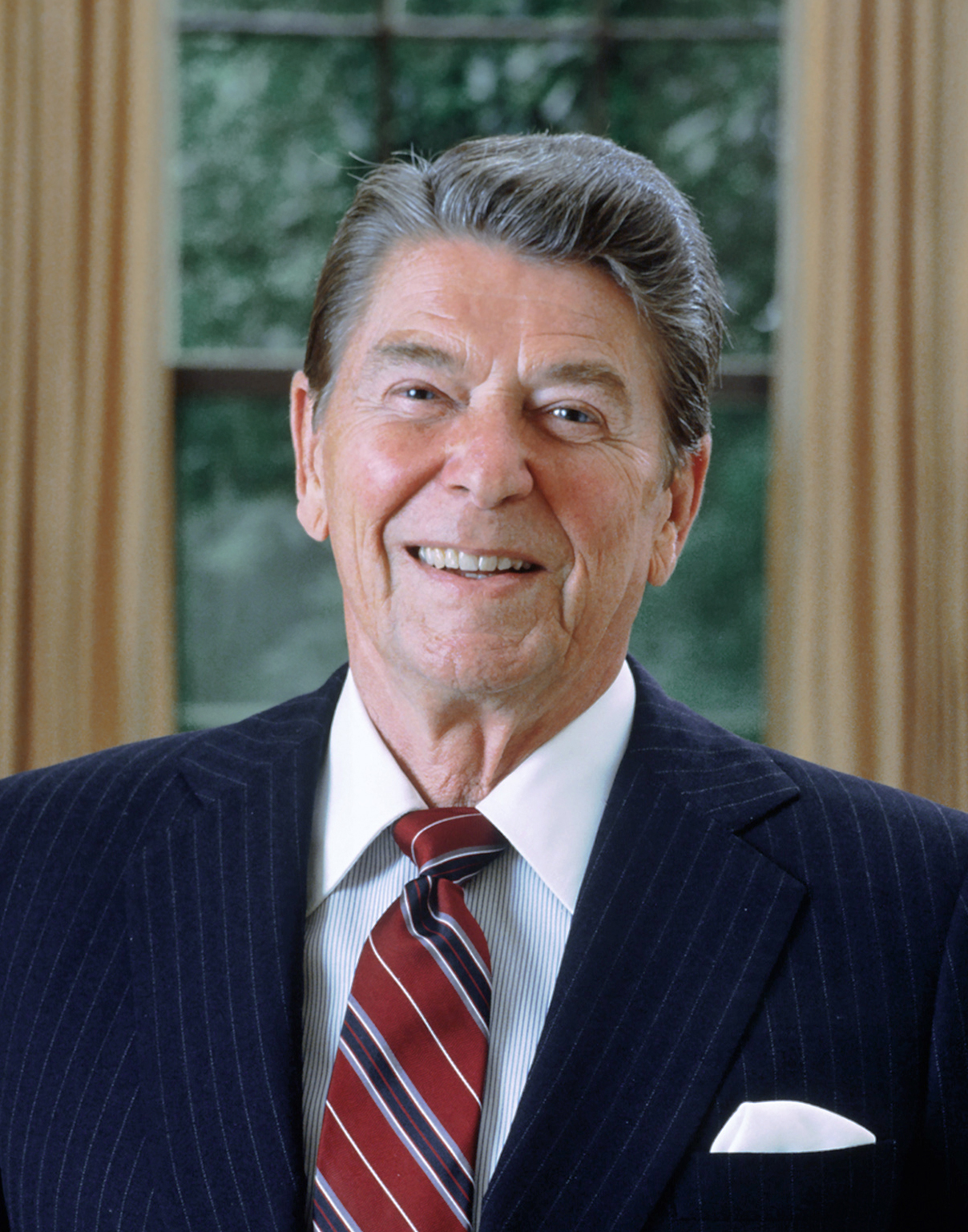
United States Ronald Reagan, President
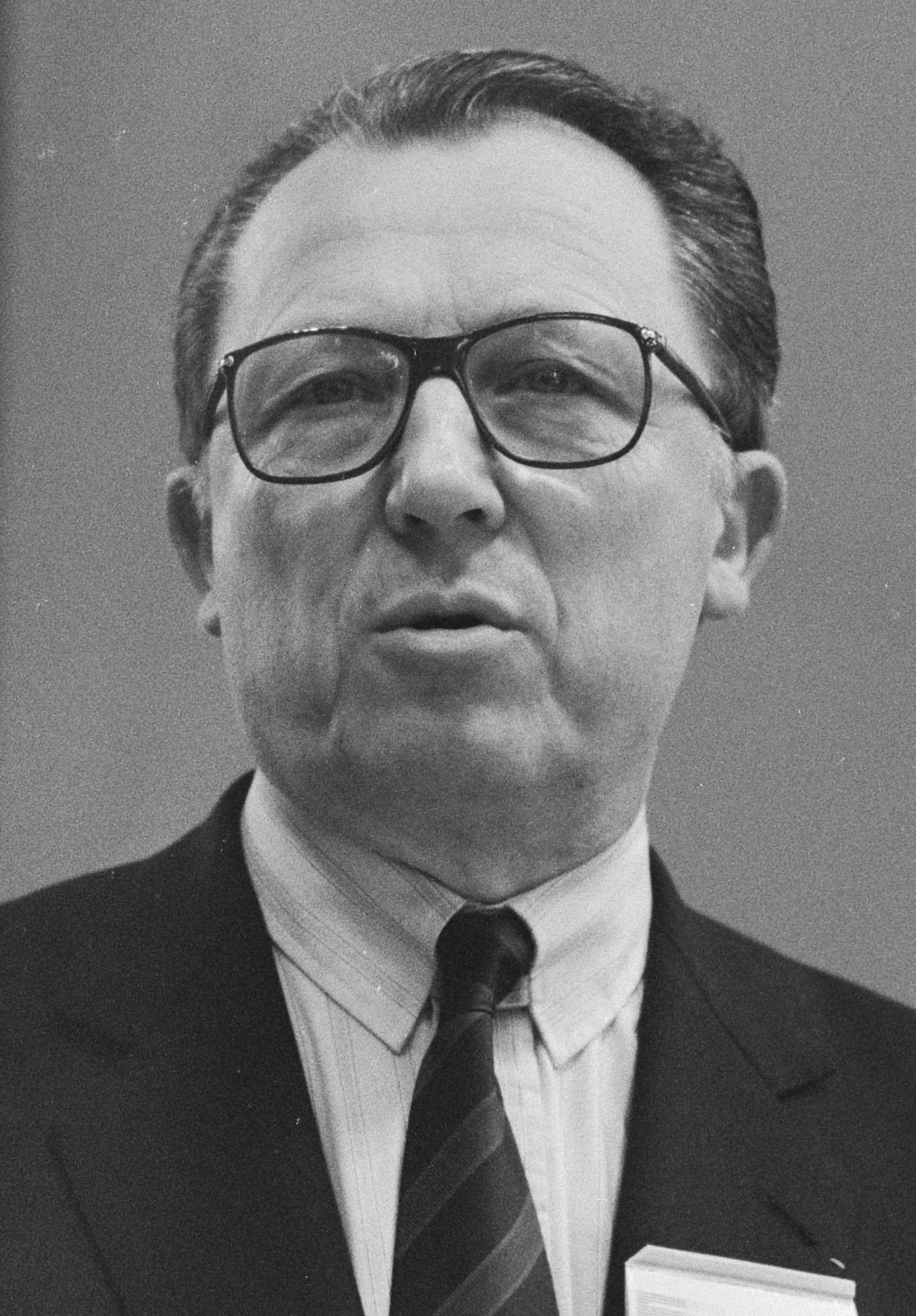
(European Union) European Union
Jacques Delors,
Commission President

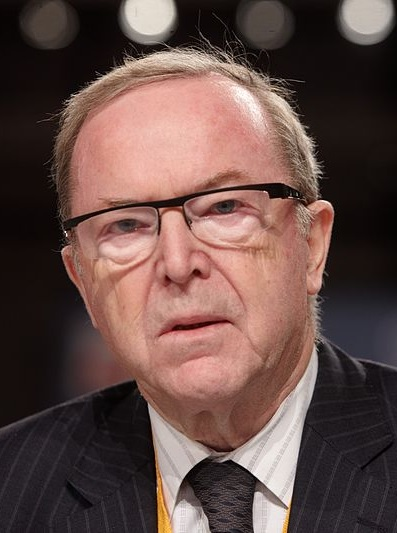
(European Union) European Union
Wilfried Martens,
Council President

== Accomplishments ==
In 1987, the summit leaders "underlined" their "responsibility" for what happens to the world's forests, but there is little evidence of follow-up action.

== See also ==
- G8
