= List of international presidential trips made by Jimmy Carter =

This is a list of international presidential trips made by Jimmy Carter, the 39th president of the United States. Jimmy Carter made 12 international trips to 25 different countries during his presidency, which began on January 20, 1977 and ended on January 20, 1981.

Carter visited five continents: Africa, Asia, Europe, North America, and South America. He was the first president to make a state visit to Sub-Saharan Africa when he went to Nigeria in 1978. His travel included five trips to Europe and three trips to Asia. He also made several trips to the Middle East including Palestine - Gaza Strip to broker peace negotiations. He was awarded the 2002 Nobel Peace Prize for his peacemaking efforts. In 1978, he travelled to Panama City to sign a protocol confirming exchange of documents ratifying the Panama Canal treaties.

== Summary ==
The number of visits per country where President Carter travelled are:

- One visit to Austria, Belgium, Brazil, India, Iran, Israel, Italy, Liberia, Mexico, Nigeria, Panama, Poland, Portugal, Saudi Arabia, South Korea, Spain, Switzerland, the United Kingdom, Vatican City, Venezuela, West Germany and Yugoslavia, Palestine (several times including Gaza Strip, Post Presidential).
- Two visits to France and Japan
- Three visits to Egypt

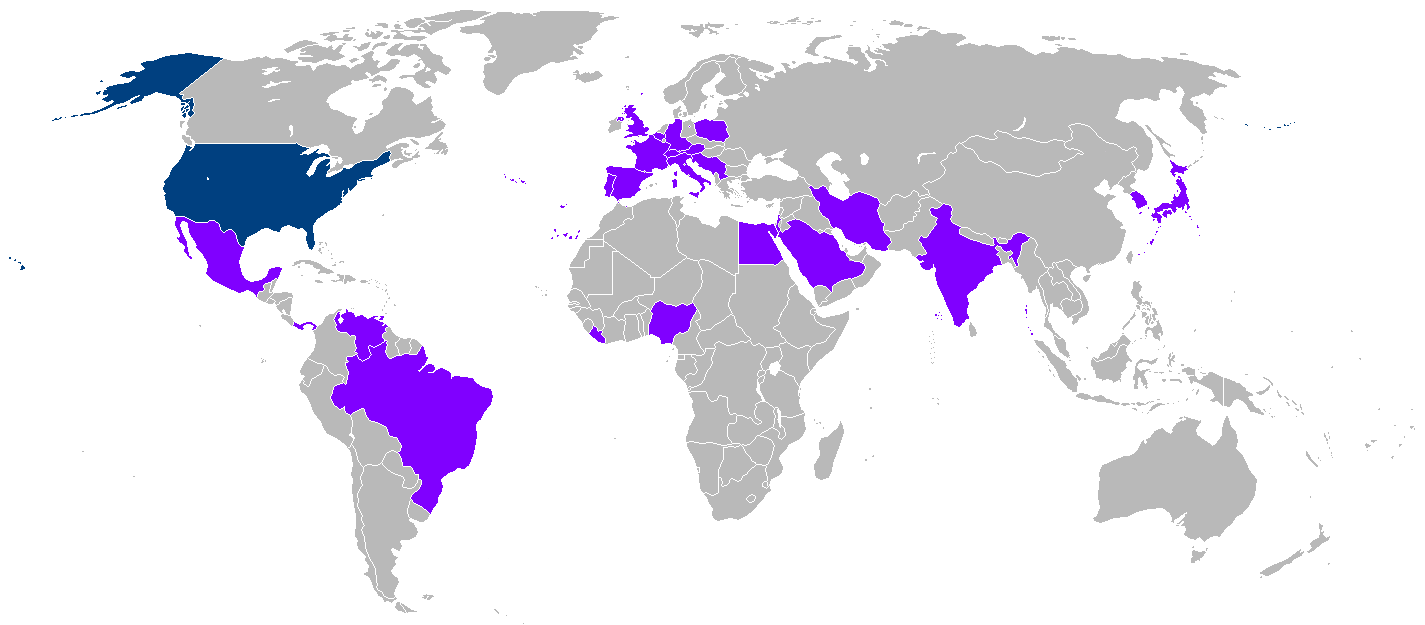
World map highlighting countries visited by Jimmy Carter while president.

== 1977 ==
| | Country | Areas visited | Dates | Details | Image |
|---|---|---|---|---|---|
| 1 | United Kingdom | London, Newcastle | May 5–11 | Attended the 3rd G7 summit. Also met with the prime ministers of Greece, Belgium, Turkey, Norway, the Netherlands and Luxembourg, and with the President of Portugal. Addressed NATO Ministers meeting. | |
| 1 | Switzerland | Geneva | May 9 | Official visit. Met with President Kurt Furgler. Also met with Syrian President Hafez al-Assad. | |
| 2 | Polish People's Republic | Warsaw | December 29–31 | Official visit. Met with First Secretary Edward Gierek. The visit garnered notoriety among Poles in subsequent years due to Carter's goodwill speech, which was mistranslated as a series of incoherent and anti-Polish remarks. | |
| 2 | Imperial State of Iran | Tehran | December 31 – January 1, 1978 | Official visit. Met with Shah Mohammad Reza Pahlavi and King Hussein of Jordan. Carter gave his "Island of Stability" speech during this visit. | |

== 1978 ==
| | Country | Areas visited | Dates | Details | Image |
|---|---|---|---|---|---|
| 2 | India | New Delhi, Daulatpur Nasirabad | January 1–3 | Met with President Neelam Sanjiva Reddy and Prime Minister Morarji Desai. Addressed Parliament of India. | |
| 2 | Saudi Arabia | Riyadh | January 3–4 | Met with King Khalid and Crown Prince Fahd. | |
| 2 | Egypt | Aswan | January 4 | Met with President Anwar Sadat and German Chancellor Helmut Schmidt. | |
| 2 | France | Paris, Normandy, Bayeux, Versailles | January 4–6 | Met with President Valéry Giscard d'Estaing and Prime Minister Raymond Barre. | |
| 2 | Belgium | Brussels | January 6 | Met with King Baudouin and Prime Minister Leo Tindemans. Attended meetings of the Commission of the European Communities and the North Atlantic Council. | |
| 3 | Venezuela | Caracas | March 28–29 | Met with President Carlos Andrés Pérez. Addressed Congress and signed maritime boundary agreement. | |
| 3 | Brazil | Brasília; Rio de Janeiro | March 29–31 | Official visit. Met with President Ernesto Geisel and addressed National Congress. | |
| 3 | Nigeria | Lagos | March 31 – April 3 | State visit. Met with President Olusegun Obasanjo. | |
| 3 | Liberia | Monrovia | April 3 | Met with President William R. Tolbert, Jr. | |
| 4 | Panama | Panama City | June 16–17 | Invited by President Demetrio B. Lakas and General Omar Torrijos to sign protocol confirming exchange of documents ratifying Panama Canal treaties. Also met informally with Venezuelan President Carlos Andrés Pérez, Colombian President Alfonso López Michelsen, Mexican President José López Portillo, Costa Rican Rodrigo Carazo Odio and Jamaican Prime Minister Michael Manley. | |
| 5 | West Germany | Bonn, Wiesbaden-Erbenheim, Frankfurt | July 14–15 | State visit. Met with President Walter Scheel and Chancellor Helmut Schmidt. Addressed U.S. and German military personnel. | |
| 5 | West Germany | West Berlin | July 15 | Spoke at the Berlin Airlift Memorial. | |
| 5 | West Germany | Bonn | July 16–17 | Attended the 4th G7 summit. | |

== 1979 ==
| | Country | Areas visited | Dates | Details | Image |
|---|---|---|---|---|---|
| 6 | France | Basse-Terre, Guadeloupe | January 4–9 | Met informally with President Valéry Giscard d'Estaing, German Chancellor Helmut Schmidt and British Prime Minister James Callaghan. | |
| 7 | Mexico | Mexico City | February 14–16 | State visit. Met with President José López Portillo. Addressed the Mexican Congress. | |
| 8 | Portugal | Lajes Field | March 8 | Stopped en route to Egypt. | |
| 8 | Egypt | Cairo, Alexandria, Giza | March 8–10 | State visit. Met with President Anwar Sadat. Addressed People's Assembly of Egypt. | |
| 8 | Israel | Tel Aviv, Jerusalem | March 10–13 | State visit. Met with President Yitzhak Navon and Prime Minister Menachem Begin. Addressed the Knesset. | |
| 8 | Egypt | Cairo | March 13 | Met with President Anwar Sadat. | |
| 8 | Portugal | Lajes Field | March 13 | Stopped during return to Washington D.C. | |
| 9 | Austria | Vienna | June 14–18 | State visit. Met with President Rudolf Kirchschläger and Chancellor Bruno Kreisky. Met with Soviet General Secretary Leonid Brezhnev to sign SALT II Treaty. | |
| 10 | Japan | Tokyo, Shimoda | June 25–29 | Attended the 5th G7 summit. State visit. Met with Emperor Hirohito and Prime Minister Masayoshi Ōhira. | |
| 10 | South Korea | Seoul | June 29 – July 1 | State visit. Met with President Park Chung-hee and Prime Minister Choi Kyu-hah. | |

== 1980 ==
| | Country | Areas visited | Dates | Details | Image |
|---|---|---|---|---|---|
| 11 | Italy | Rome, Venice | June 19–24 | Attended the 6th G7 summit. State visit. Met with President Sandro Pertini. | |
| 11 | Vatican City | Apostolic Palace | June 21 | Audience with Pope John Paul II. | |
| 11 | Yugoslavia | Belgrade | June 24–25 | Official visit. Met with President Cvijetin Mijatović. | |
| 11 | Spain | Madrid | June 25–26 | Official visit. Met with King Juan Carlos I and Prime Minister Adolfo Suárez. | |
| 11 | Portugal | Lisbon | June 26–30 | Official visit. Met with President António Ramalho Eanes and Prime Minister Francisco de Sá Carneiro. | |
| 12 | Japan | Tokyo | July 9–10 | Official visit. Attended memorial services for former Prime Minister Masayoshi Ōhira. Met with Emperor Hirohito, Bangla President Ziaur Rahman, Australian Prime Minister Malcolm Fraser, Thai Prime Minister Prem Tinsulanonda and Chinese Premier Hua Guofeng. | |

== Multilateral meetings ==
Multilateral meetings of the following intergovernmental organizations took place during Jimmy Carter's presidency (1977–1981).

| Group | Year | | | |
| Group | 1977 | 1978 | 1979 | 1980 |
|---|---|---|---|---|
| G7 | May 7–8 (United Kingdom) London | July 16–17 (West Germany) Bonn | June 28–29 (Japan) Tokyo | June 22–23 (Italy) Venice |
| NATO | May 10–11 (United Kingdom) London | May 30–31 (United States) Washington, D.C. | none | none |

== See also ==
- Foreign policy of the Carter administration
- Foreign policy of the United States
