= London Summit =

London Summit may refer to:

Meeting and conferences

- 2025 London Summit on Ukraine
- 2009 G-20 London Summit
- 1977 London summit or 4th NATO summitt
- 17th G7 summit, or 1991 G7 London summit
- 10th G7 summit, or 1984 G7 London summit
- 3rd G7 summit, or 1977 G7 London summit
- London Conference of 1913

Geographic peaks

- the summit of Mount London
- the summit of London Mountain
- the summit of London Peak, see List of mountains in Madison County, Montana
