= 2nd G7 summit =

1976 international leader meeting in Puerto Rico

2nd G7 summit Rambouillet II Economic Summit at Puerto Rico
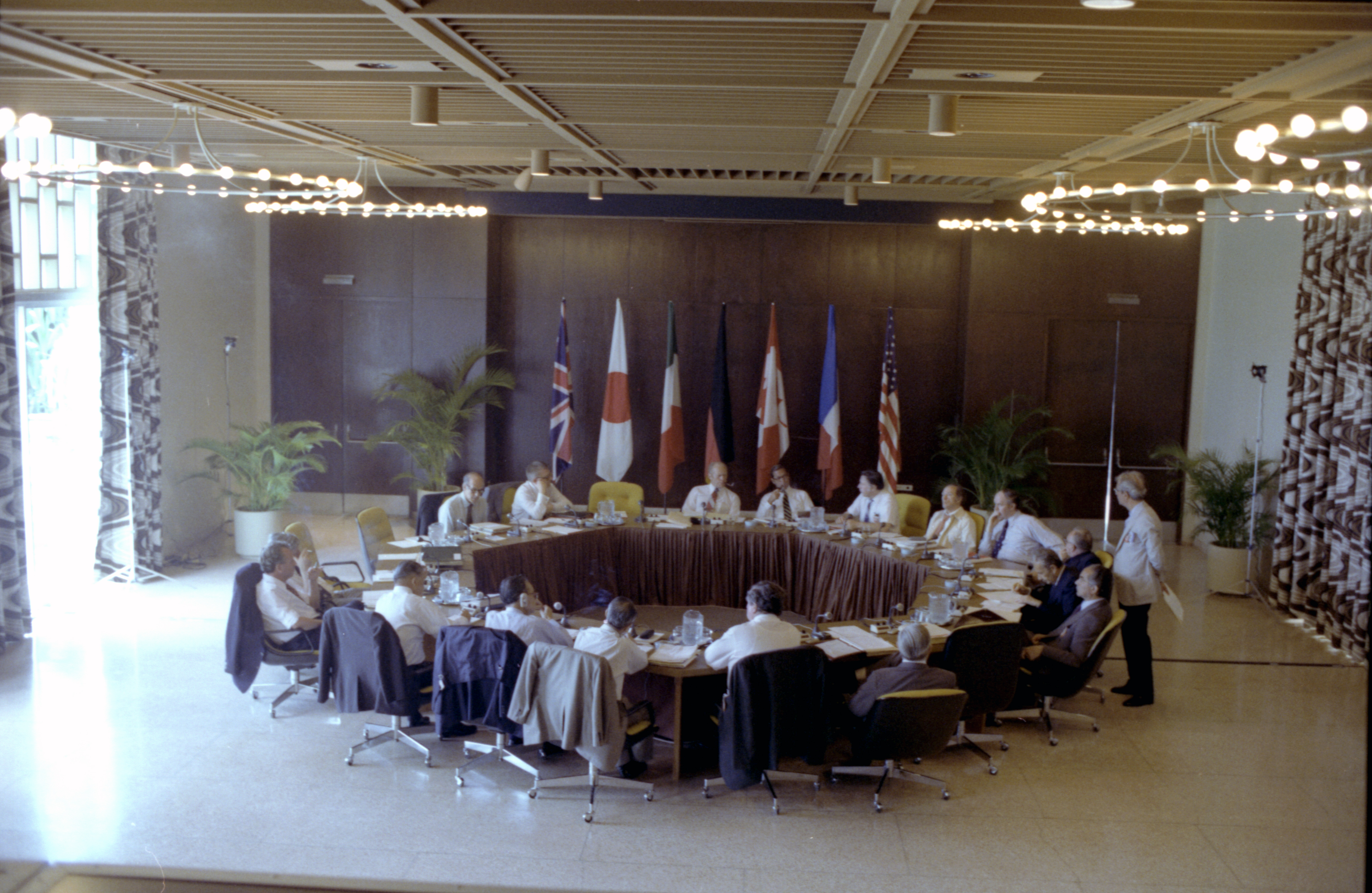
- Delegates from Canada, France, Germany, Italy, Japan, the United Kingdom, and the United States during the second session
- Host country: United States
- Dates: June 27–28, 1976
- Cities: Dorado
- Venues: Dorado Beach Hotel (now Dorado Beach Resort)
- Participants: (Canada) Pierre Trudeau (Prime Minister); (France) Valéry Giscard d'Estaing (President); (West Germany) Helmut Schmidt (Chancellor); (Italy) Aldo Moro (Prime Minister); (Japan) Takeo Miki (Prime Minister); (United Kingdom) James Callaghan (Prime Minister); (United States) Gerald Ford (host) (President)
- Follows: 1st G6 summit
- Precedes: 3rd G7 summit

The 2nd G7 Summit, also called Rambouillet II, was held at Dorado, Puerto Rico, between June 27 and 28, 1976. The venue for the summit meetings was the Dorado Beach Hotel, now Dorado Beach Resort, which is near San Juan, Puerto Rico.

The Group of Six (G6) was an unofficial forum which brought together the heads of the richest industrialized countries: France, West Germany, Italy, Japan, the United Kingdom, and the United States; and the Group of Seven (G7), meeting for the first time this year, was formed with the addition of Canada. This summit, and the others which would follow, were not meant to be linked formally with wider international institutions; and in fact, a kind of frustrated rebellion against the stiff formality of other international meetings was an element in the genesis of cooperation between France's president and West Germany's chancellor as they conceived the first summit of the G6.

== Leaders at the summit ==
The G7 is an unofficial annual forum for the leaders of Canada, France, West Germany, Italy, Japan, the United Kingdom and the United States.

The 2nd G7 summit was the first summit for British Prime Minister James Callaghan and, as it was formed with the addition of Canada, Canadian Prime Minister Pierre Trudeau. It was also the last summit for Italian Prime Minister Aldo Moro, Japanese Prime Minister Takeo Miki, and US President Gerald Ford.

The first summit session began at 4:15 p.m. and concluded at 7:05 pm, while the second and final took place between 9:00 a.m. and 11:30 am, however, the leaders' held speeches until 3:00 pm. Both sessions were celebrated at the Dorado Beach Hotel's Salon Del Mar.

=== Participants ===
These summit participants are the current "core members" of the international forum: Trudeau of Canada had been invited because he had eight years experience.

**Core G7 members** Host state and leader are shown in bold text.
Member		Represented by	Title	In office since
(Canada)	Canada	Pierre Trudeau	Prime Minister	1968
(France)	France	Valéry Giscard d'Estaing	President	1974
(West Germany)	West Germany	Helmut Schmidt	Chancellor	1974
(Italy)	Italy	Aldo Moro	Prime Minister	1974
(Japan)	Japan	Takeo Miki	Prime Minister	1974
(United Kingdom)	United Kingdom	James Callaghan	Prime Minister	1976
(United States)	**United States**	**Gerald Ford**	**President**	1974

== Issues ==
The summit was intended as a venue for resolving differences among its members. As a practical matter, the summit was also conceived as an opportunity for its members to give each other mutual encouragement in the face of difficult economic decisions.

== Gallery of participating leaders ==
=== Core G7 participants ===
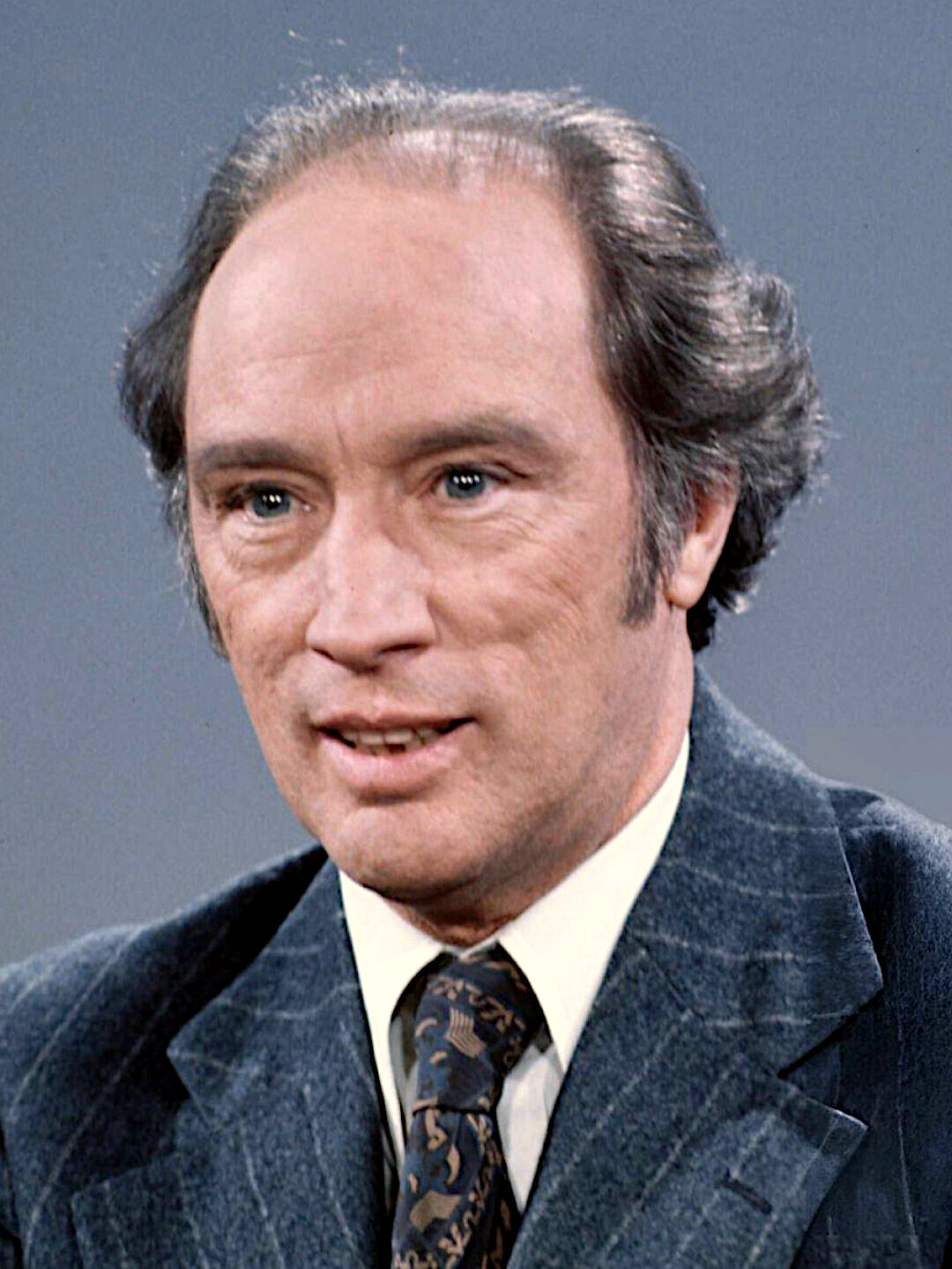
(Canada) Canada
Pierre Trudeau,
Prime Minister

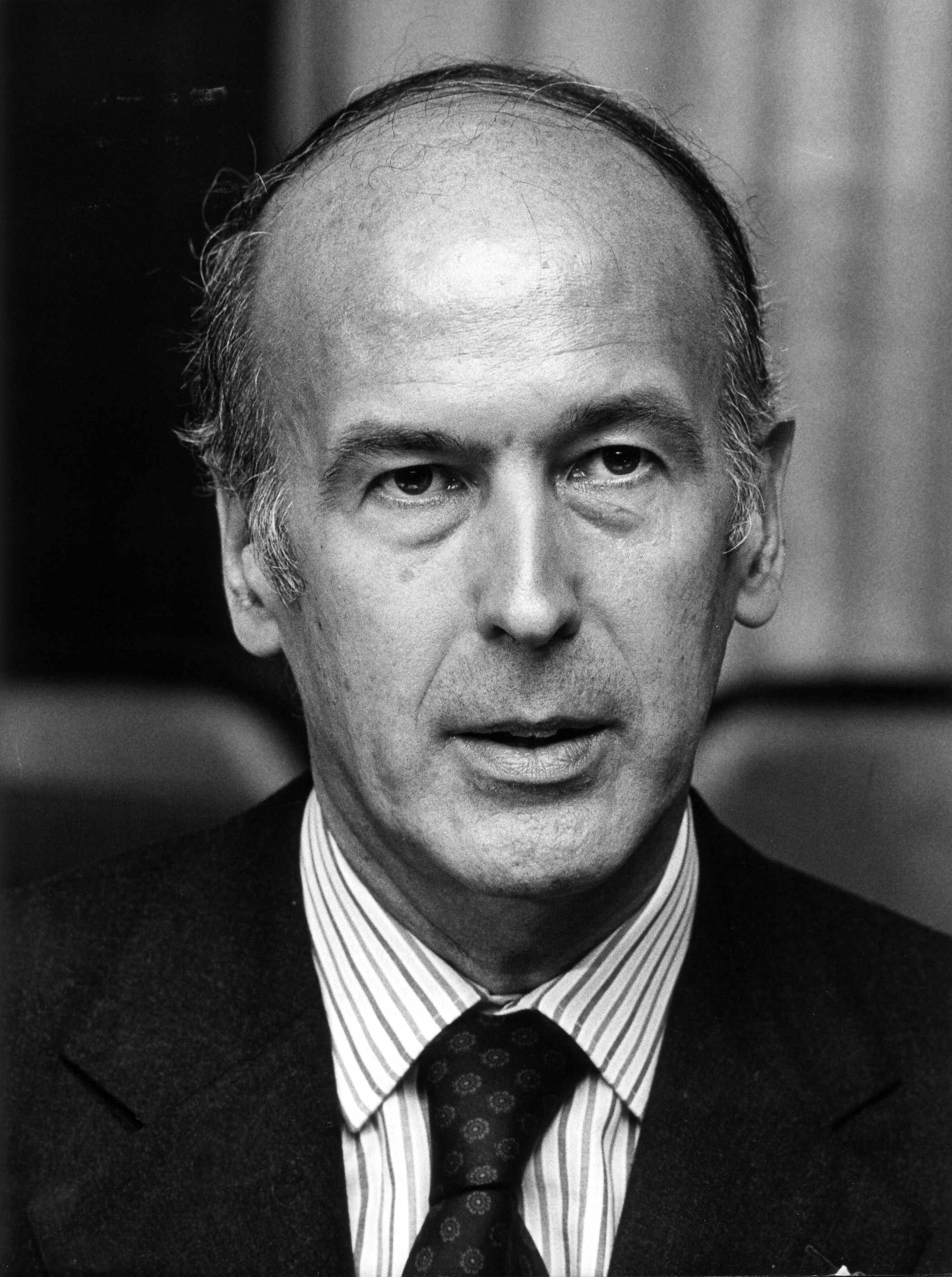
(France) France
Valéry Giscard d'Estaing,
President

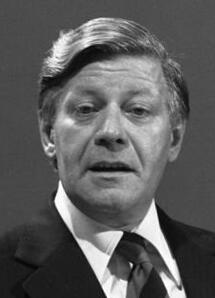
(Germany) Germany
Helmut Schmidt,
Chancellor

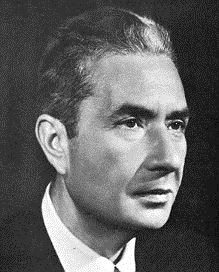
(Italy) Italy
Aldo Moro,
Prime Minister

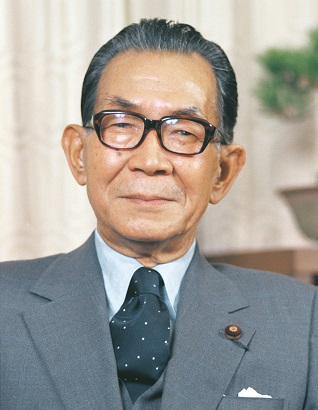
(Japan) Japan
Takeo Miki,
Prime Minister

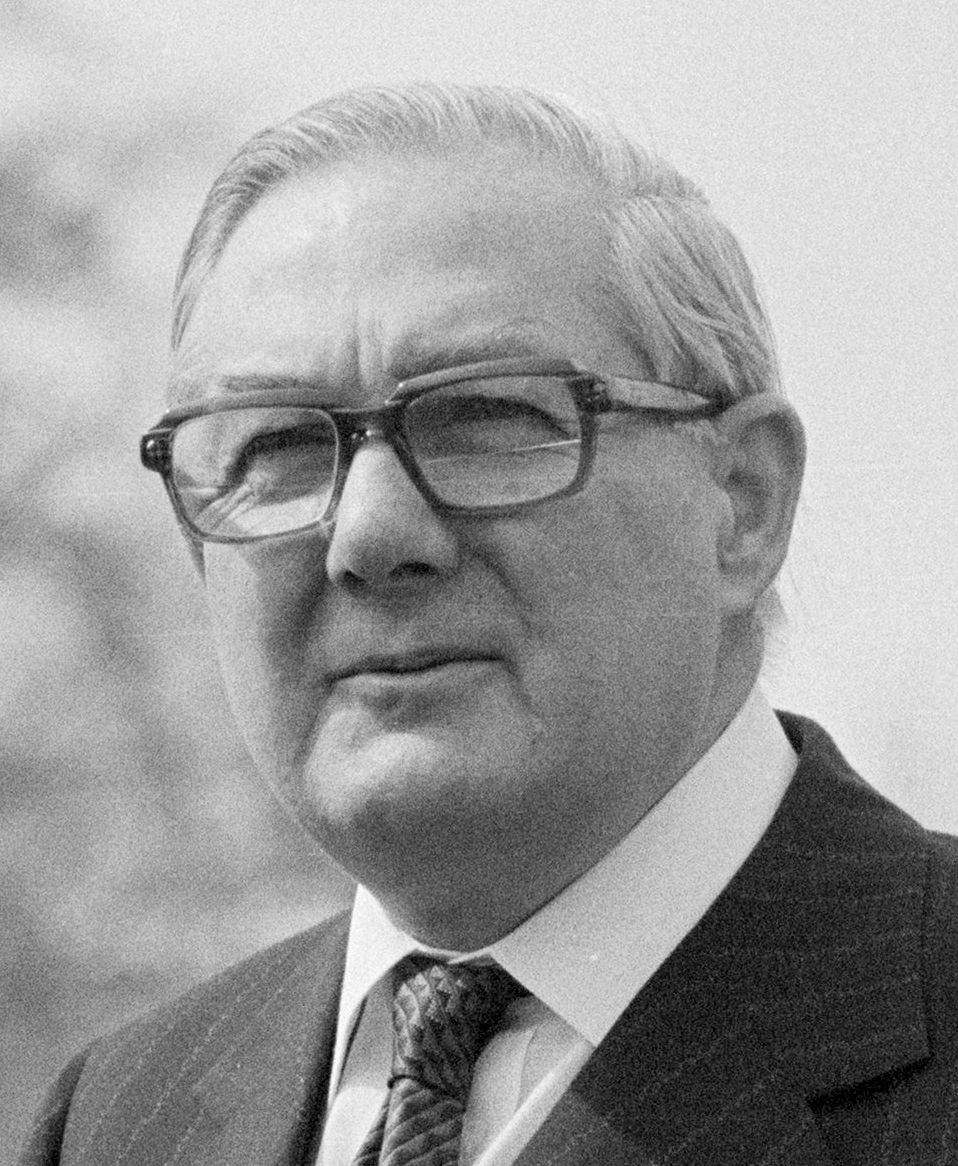
(United Kingdom) United Kingdom
James Callaghan,
Prime Minister

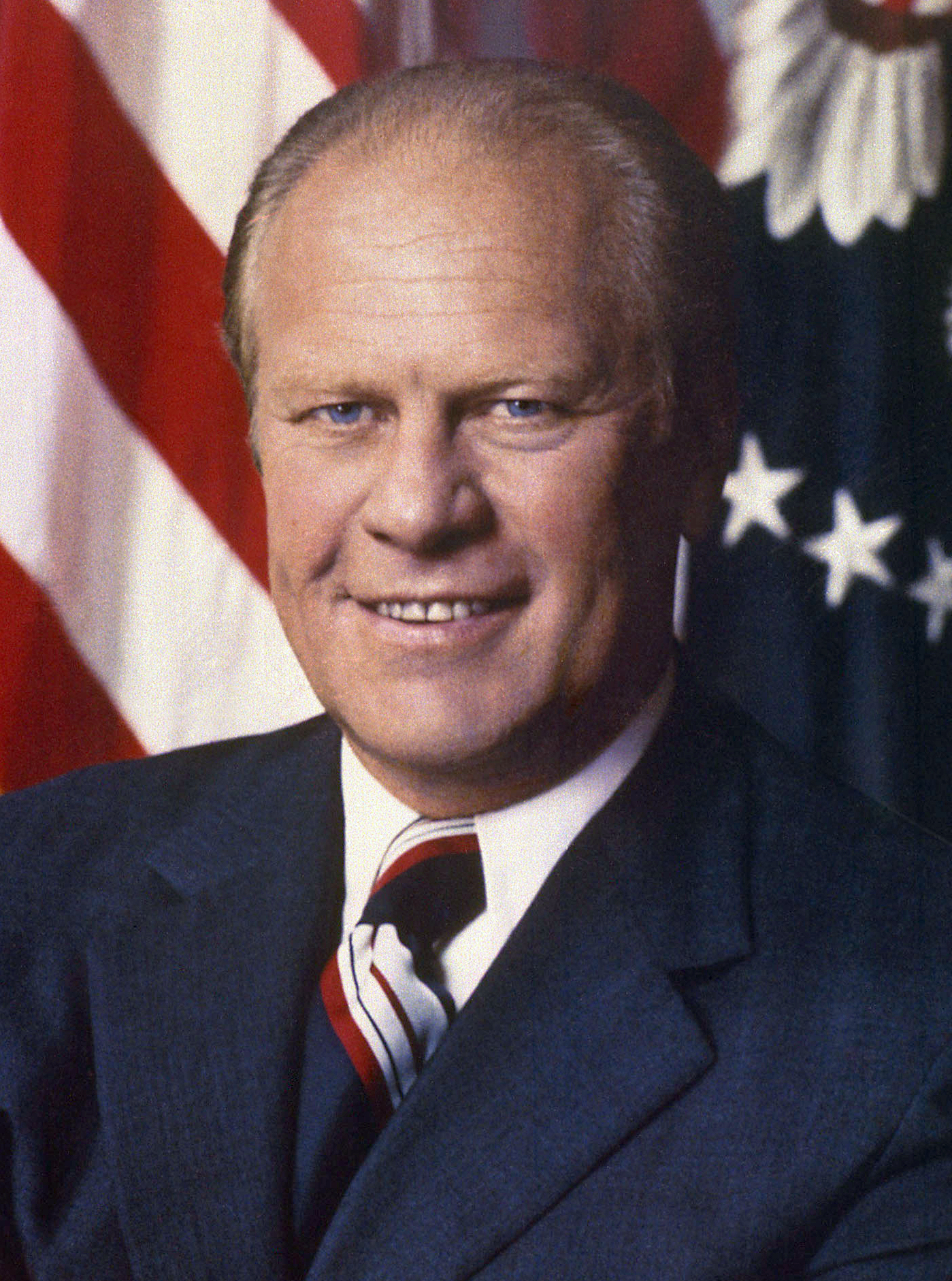
(United States) United States
Gerald Ford,
President (Host)

== See also ==
- G8

== Notes ==
- Bayne, Nicholas and Robert D. Putnam. (2000). Hanging in There: The G7 and G8 Summit in Maturity and Renewal. Aldershot, Hampshire, England: Ashgate Publishing. ISBN 978-0-7546-1185-1; OCLC 43186692
- Reinalda, Bob and Bertjan Verbeek. (1998). Autonomous Policy Making by International Organizations. London: Routledge. ISBN 978-0-415-16486-3; ISBN 978-0-203-45085-7; OCLC 39013643
