= 1st G6 summit =

1975 international leader meeting in France

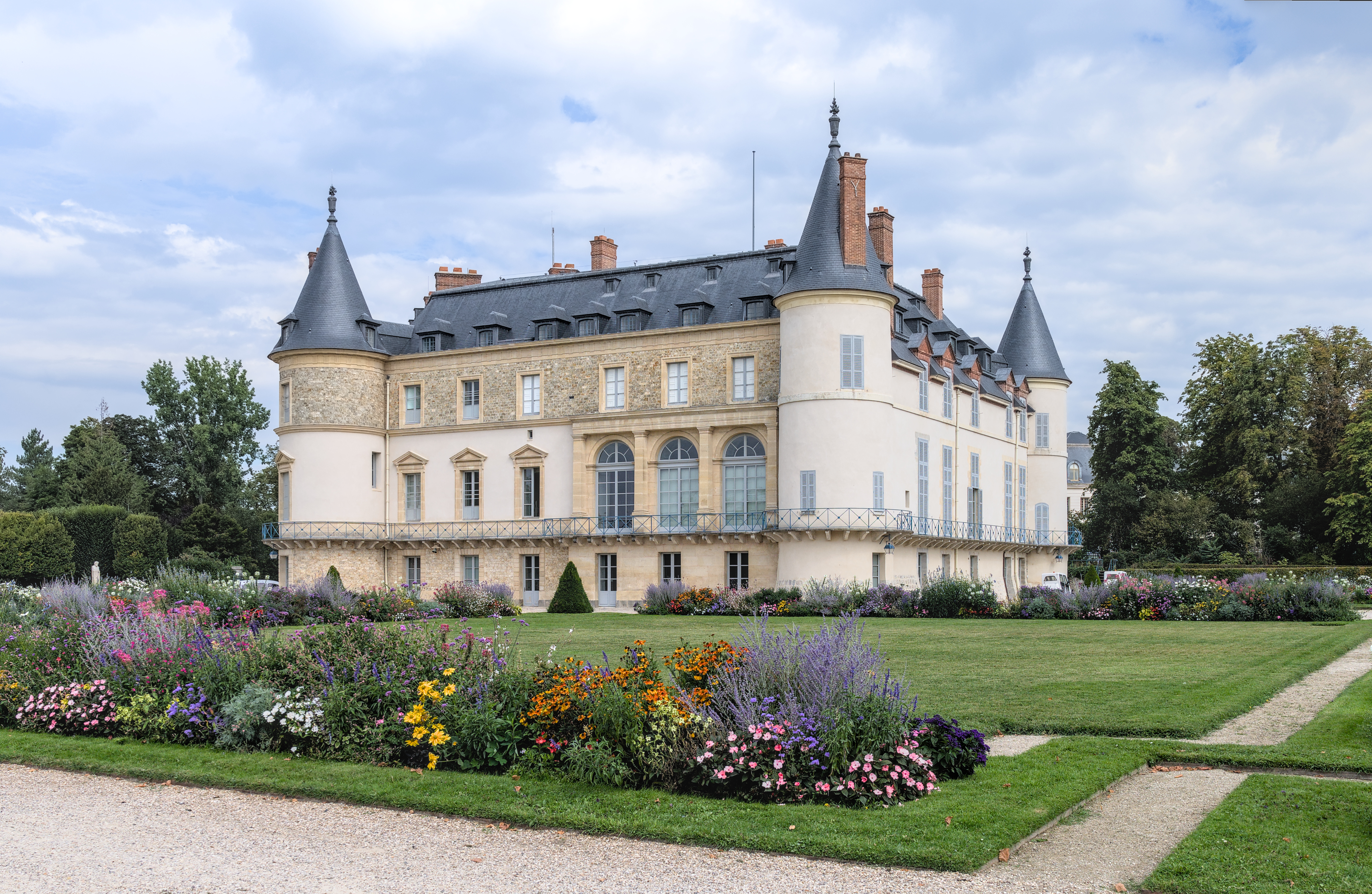
- Château de Rambouillet
- Host country: France
- Dates: 15–17 November 1975
- Cities: Rambouillet
- Venues: Château de Rambouillet
- Participants: (France) Valéry Giscard d'Estaing (host) (President); (West Germany) Helmut Schmidt (Chancellor); (Italy) Aldo Moro (Prime Minister); (Japan) Takeo Miki (Prime Minister); (United Kingdom) Harold Wilson (Prime Minister); (United States) Gerald Ford (President)
- Precedes: 2nd G7 summit

The 1st G6 summit took place on 15–17 November 1975, at the Château de Rambouillet, France.

The Group of Six (G6) was an unofficial forum which brought together the heads of the richest industrialized countries: France, West Germany, Italy, Japan, the United Kingdom, and the United States. This summit, and the others which would follow, were not meant to be linked formally with wider international institutions; and in fact, a kind of frustrated rebellion against the stiff formality of other international meetings was an element in the genesis of cooperation between France's president and West Germany's chancellor as they conceived the first summit of the G6.

Later summits in what could become a continuing series of annual meetings were identified as the Group of Seven (G7) and Group of Eight (G8) summits – but this informal gathering was the one which set that process in motion.

== Leaders at the summit ==
This was an unofficial forum (retreat) for the leaders of France, Germany, Italy, Japan, the United Kingdom, and the United States, and a chance for them to get to know one another. It was important to note that each of them had attained office the previous year due to unforeseeable circumstances.

=== Participants ===
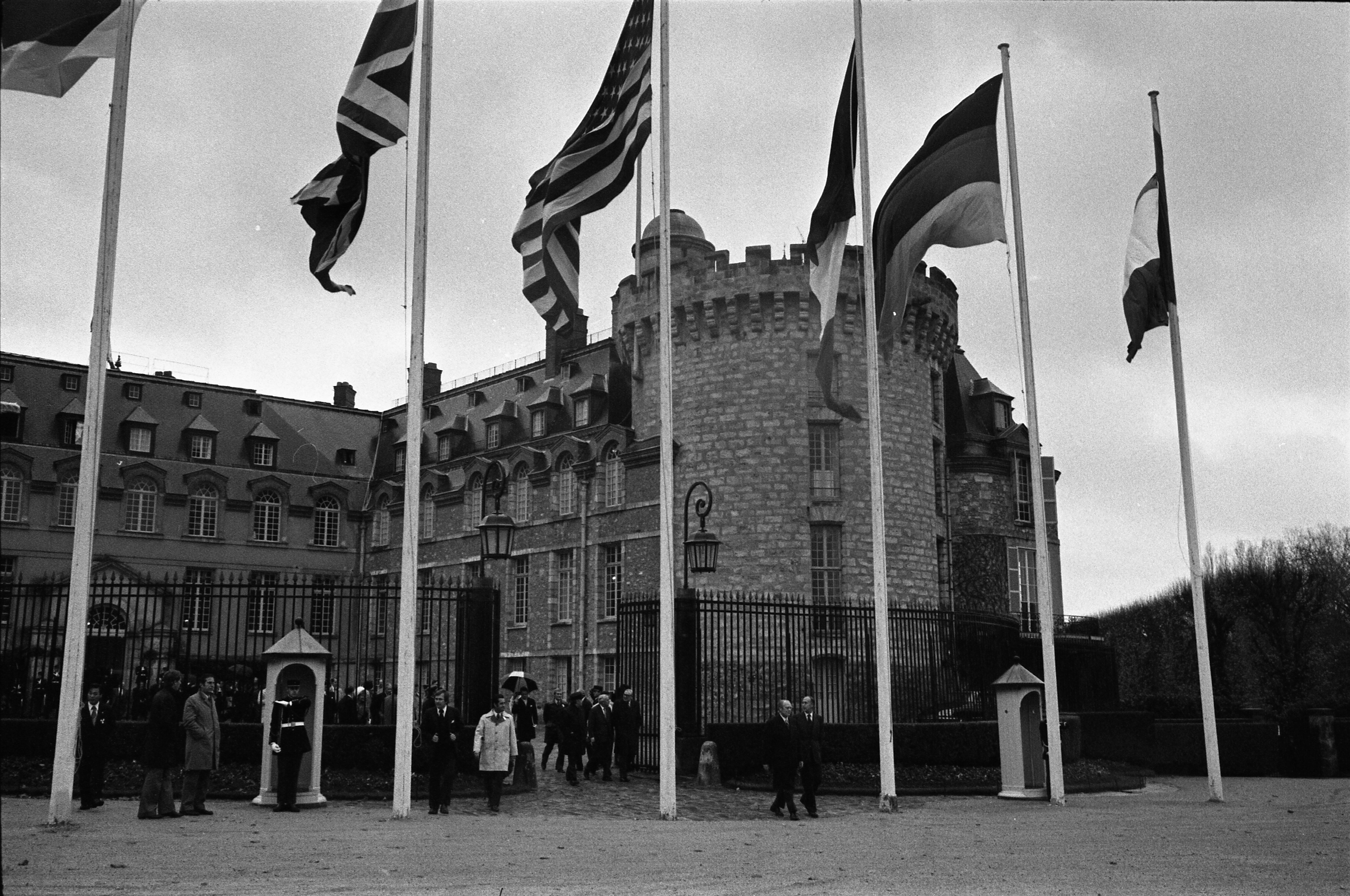
President Gerald R. Ford and French President Valery Giscard d'Estaing walking outside of the Chateau de Rambouillet. 17 November 1975.

These summit participants considered themselves representative of the "core" industrialized countries forum:

**Core G6 members** Host state and leader are shown in bold text.
Member		Represented by	Title	achieved office
(France)	**France**	**Valéry Giscard d'Estaing**	**President**	May 1974
(West Germany)	West Germany	Helmut Schmidt	Chancellor	May 1974
(Italy)	Italy	Aldo Moro	Prime Minister	November 1974
(Japan)	Japan	Takeo Miki	Prime Minister	December 1974
(United Kingdom)	United Kingdom	Harold Wilson	Prime Minister	March 1974
(United States)	United States	Gerald Ford	President	August 1974

== Issues ==
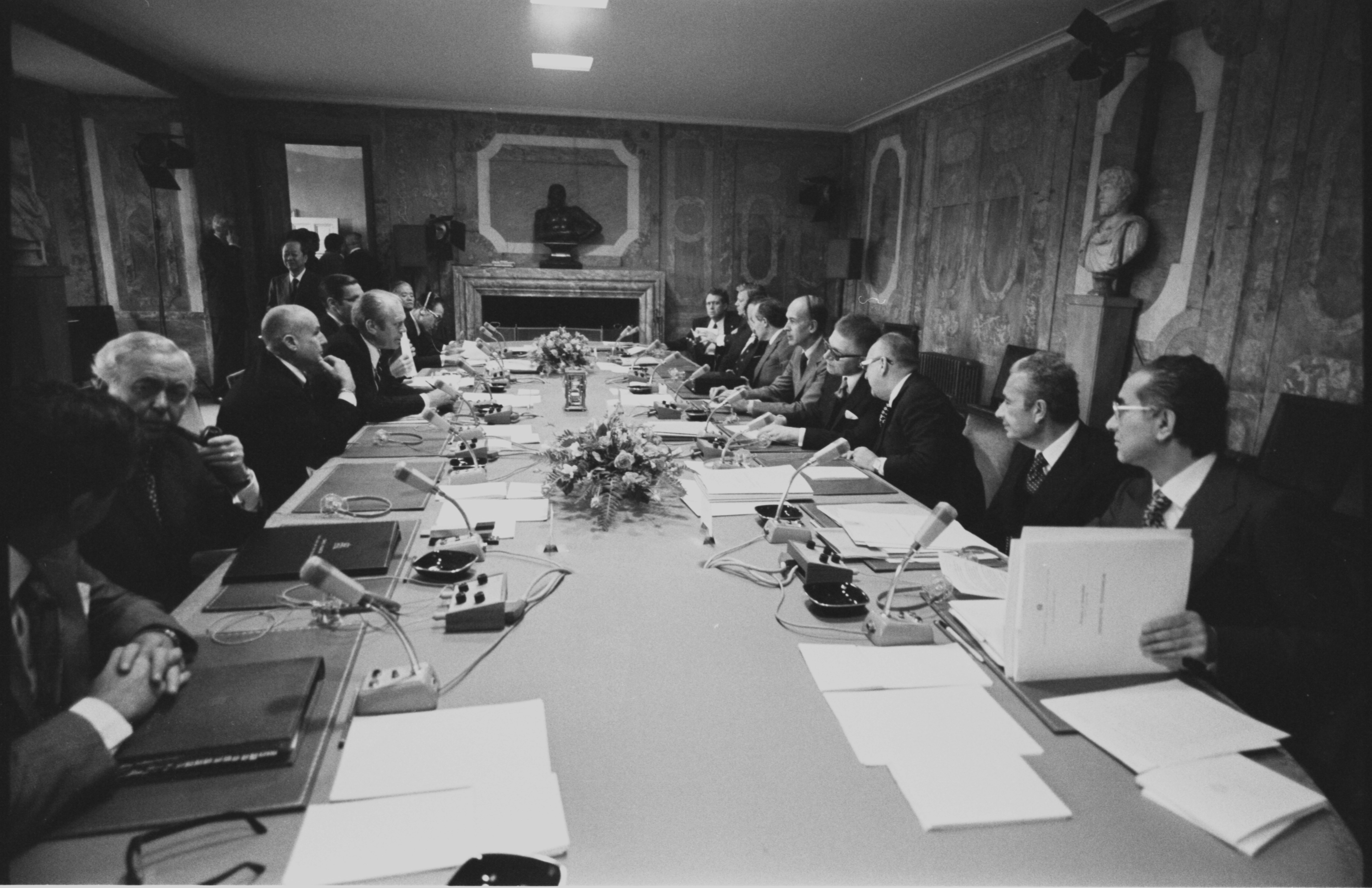
Photograph from the Salle des Marbres, Chateau de Rambouillet. Taken on 15 November 1975.

The summit was intended as a venue for resolving differences among its members. As a practical matter, the summit was also conceived as an opportunity for its members to give each other mutual encouragement in the face of difficult economic decisions. Rambouillet had no easy answers to what was then the most serious recession since the 1930s; but the main themes of what would later become known as the "1st G7/G8 summit" will remain for decades on the world's agenda—avoiding protectionism, energy dependency and boosting growth.

Issues which were discussed at this summit included:

- Searching and productive exchange of views on world economy
- Political and economic responsibilities of democracies
- Growth of interdependence and fostering international cooperation
- Inflation and energy crises
- Unemployment and economic recovery
- Fostering growth of world trade
- Monetary stability
- Multilateral trade negotiations
- Economic relations with the Soviet Union and the Eastern Bloc
- Cooperative relationship and improved understanding of developing countries
- Conference on International Economic Co-operation
- Cooperation via international organizations

== Gallery of participating leaders ==
=== Core G6 participants ===
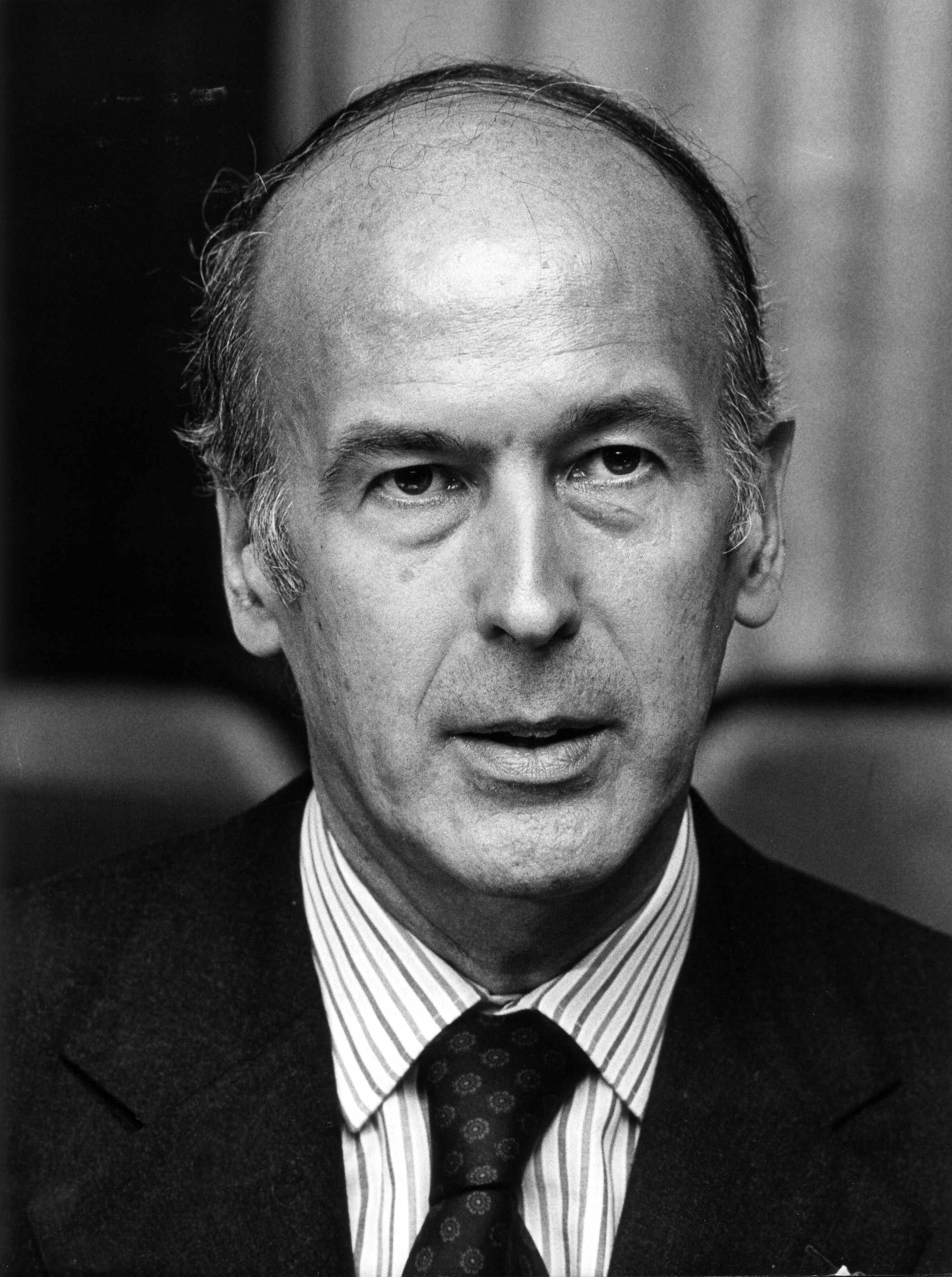
(France) France
Valéry Giscard d'Estaing,
President (Host)

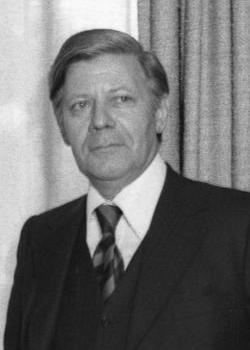
(Germany) Germany
Helmut Schmidt,
Chancellor

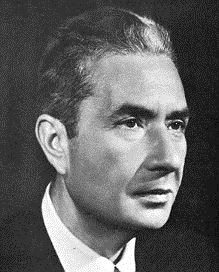
(Italy) Italy
Aldo Moro,
Prime Minister

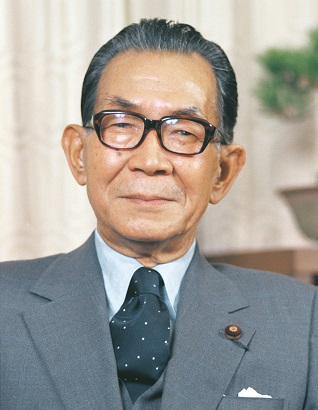
(Japan) Japan
Takeo Miki,
Prime Minister

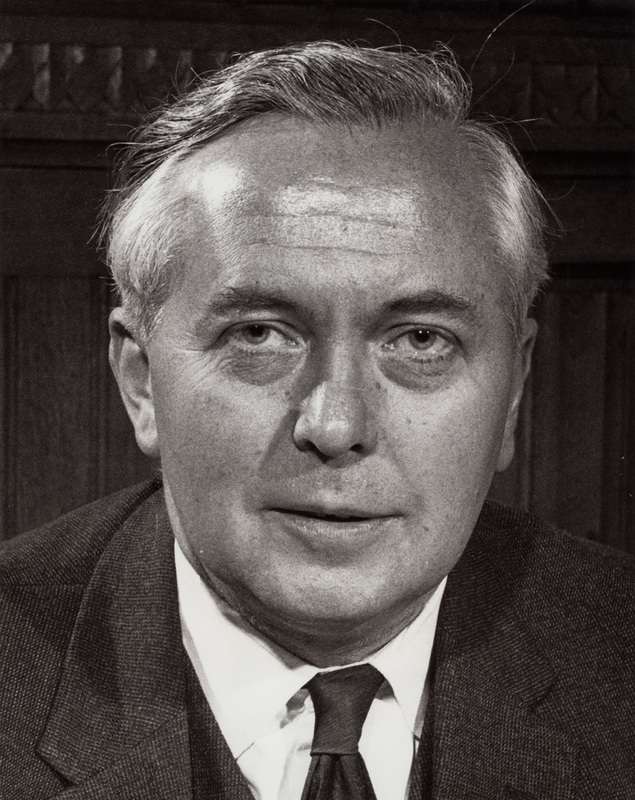
(United Kingdom) United Kingdom
Harold Wilson,
Prime Minister

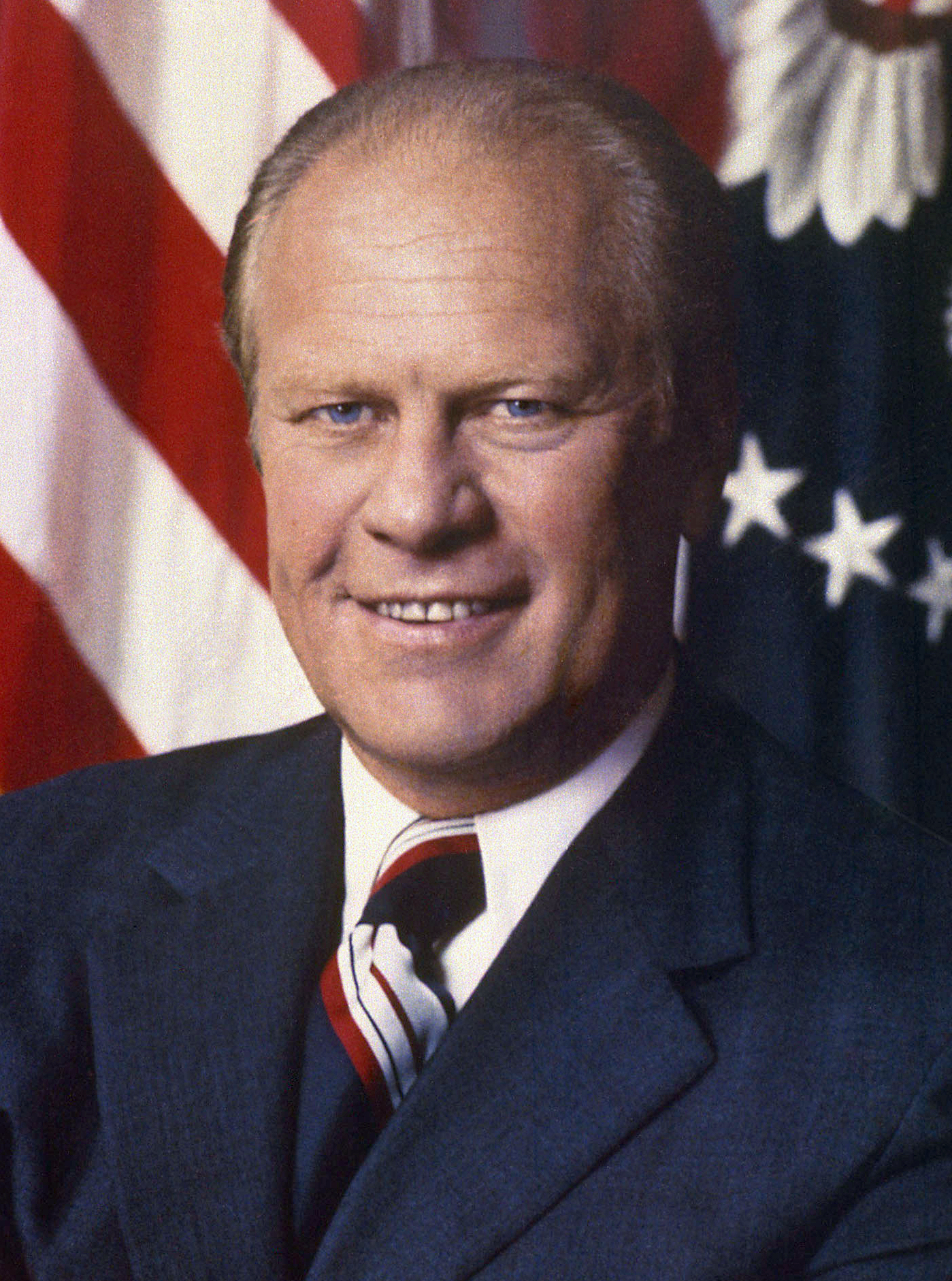
(United States) United States
Gerald Ford,
President
