= 4th G7 summit =

1978 international leader meeting in West Germany

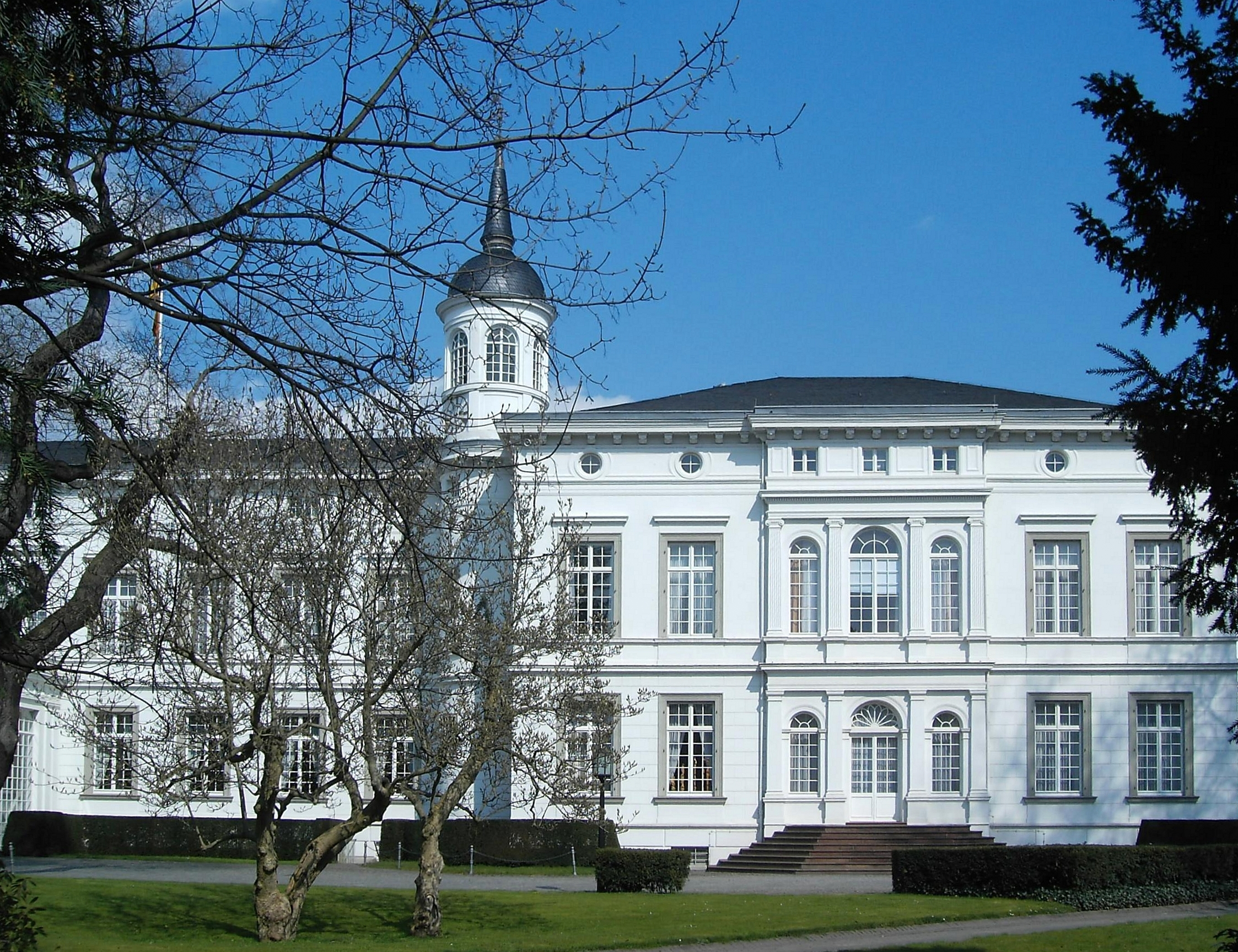
- Schaumburg Palace in Bonn
- Host country: West Germany
- Dates: 16–17 July 1978
- Cities: Bonn
- Venues: Palais Schaumburg
- Participants: Pierre Trudeau (Canada); Valéry Giscard d'Estaing (France); Helmut Schmidt (West Germany) (host); Giulio Andreotti (Italy); Takeo Fukuda (Japan); James Callaghan (United Kingdom); Jimmy Carter (United States); Roy Jenkins (European Commission); Helmut Schmidt (European Council)
- Follows: 3rd G7 summit
- Precedes: 5th G7 summit

The 4th G7 Summit was held at Bonn, West Germany, between 16 and 17 July 1978. The venue for the summit meeting was at the former official residence of the Chancellor of the Federal Republic of Germany in Bonn, the Palais Schaumburg.

The Group of Seven (G7) was an unofficial forum which brought together the heads of the richest industrialized countries: France, West Germany, Italy, Japan, the United Kingdom, the United States, Canada (since 1976), and the President of the European Commission (starting officially in 1981). The summits were not meant to be linked formally with wider international institutions; and in fact, a mild rebellion against the stiff formality of other international meetings was a part of the genesis of cooperation between France's president Valéry Giscard d'Estaing and West Germany's chancellor Helmut Schmidt as they conceived the first Group of Six (G6) summit in 1975.

== Leaders at the summit ==
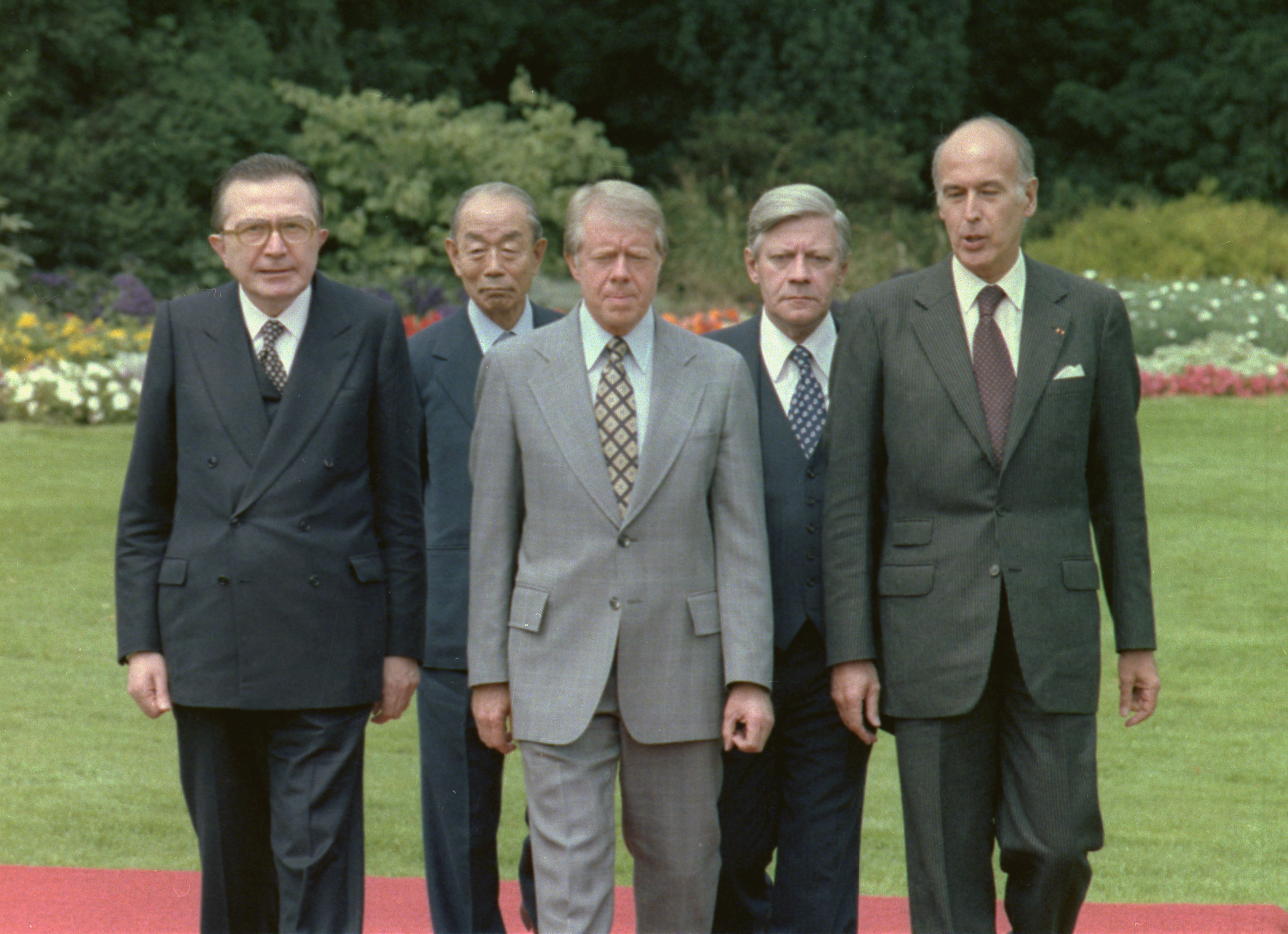
Five of the G7 leaders at the 4th G7 Summit. From left to right: Giulio Andreotti, Takeo Fukuda, Jimmy Carter, Helmut Schmidt, and Valéry Giscard d'Estaing

The G7 is an unofficial annual forum for the leaders of Canada, the European Commission, France, West Germany, Italy, Japan, the United Kingdom and the United States.

The 4th G7 summit was the last summit for British Prime Minister James Callaghan and Japanese Prime Minister Takeo Fukuda.

=== Participants ===
These summit participants are the current "core members" of the international forum:

**Core G7 members** Host state and leader are shown in bold text.
Member		Represented by	Title
(Canada)	Canada	Pierre Trudeau	Prime Minister
(France)	France	Valéry Giscard d'Estaing	President
(West Germany)	**West Germany**	**Helmut Schmidt**	**Chancellor**
(Italy)	Italy	Giulio Andreotti	Prime Minister
(Japan)	Japan	Takeo Fukuda	Prime Minister
(United Kingdom)	United Kingdom	James Callaghan	Prime Minister
(United States)	United States	Jimmy Carter	President
(European Union)	European Community	Roy Jenkins	Commission President
(European Union)	European Community	Helmut Schmidt	Council President

== Issues ==
The summit was intended as a venue for resolving differences among its members. As a practical matter, the summit was also conceived as an opportunity for its members to give each other mutual encouragement in the face of difficult economic decisions. This was the first summit where rather than simply issuing joint statements, participants committed themselves to policy decisions.

== Gallery of participating leaders ==
=== Core G7 participants ===
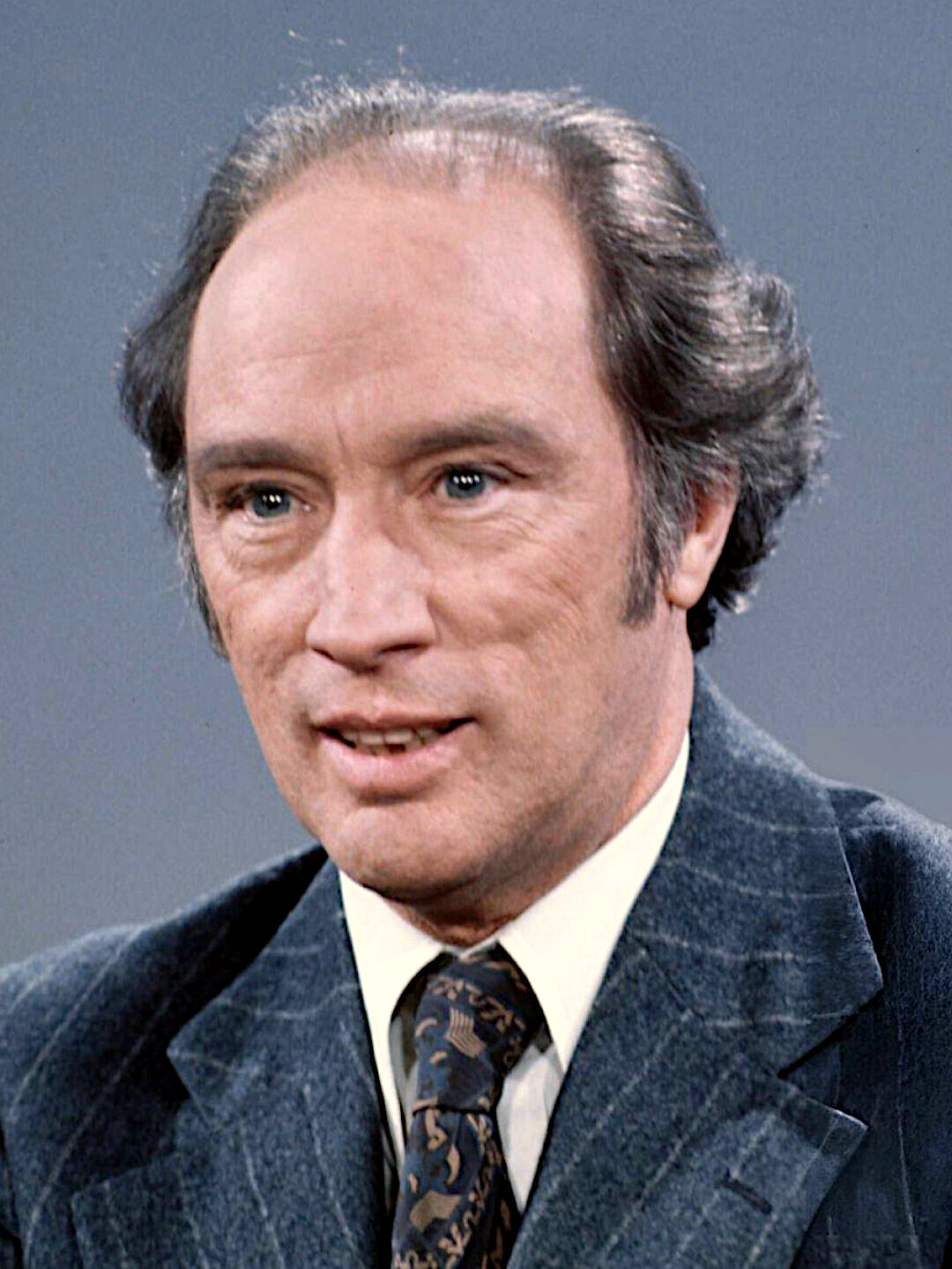
(Canada) Canada
Pierre Trudeau,
Prime Minister

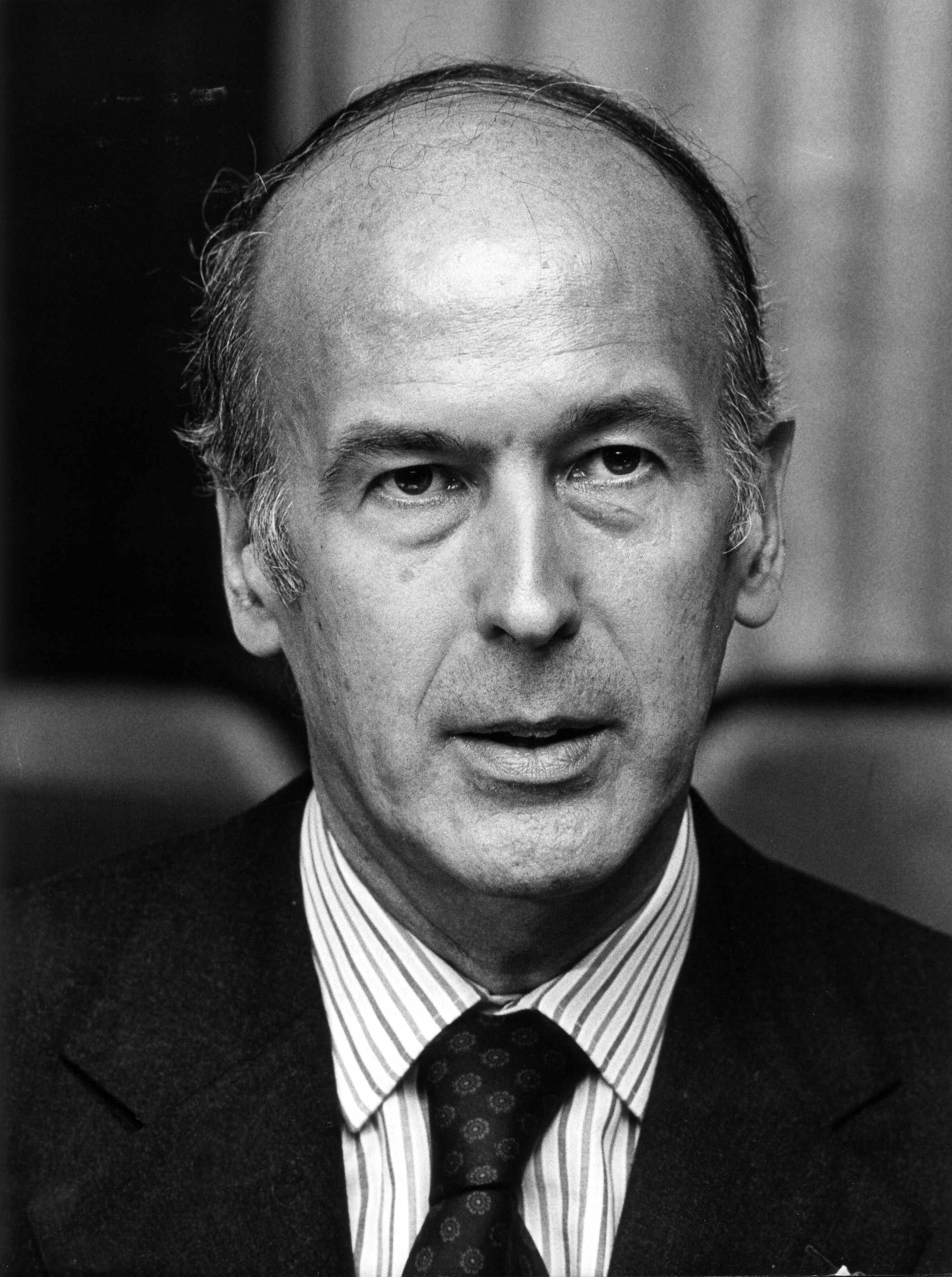
(France) France
Valéry Giscard d'Estaing,
President

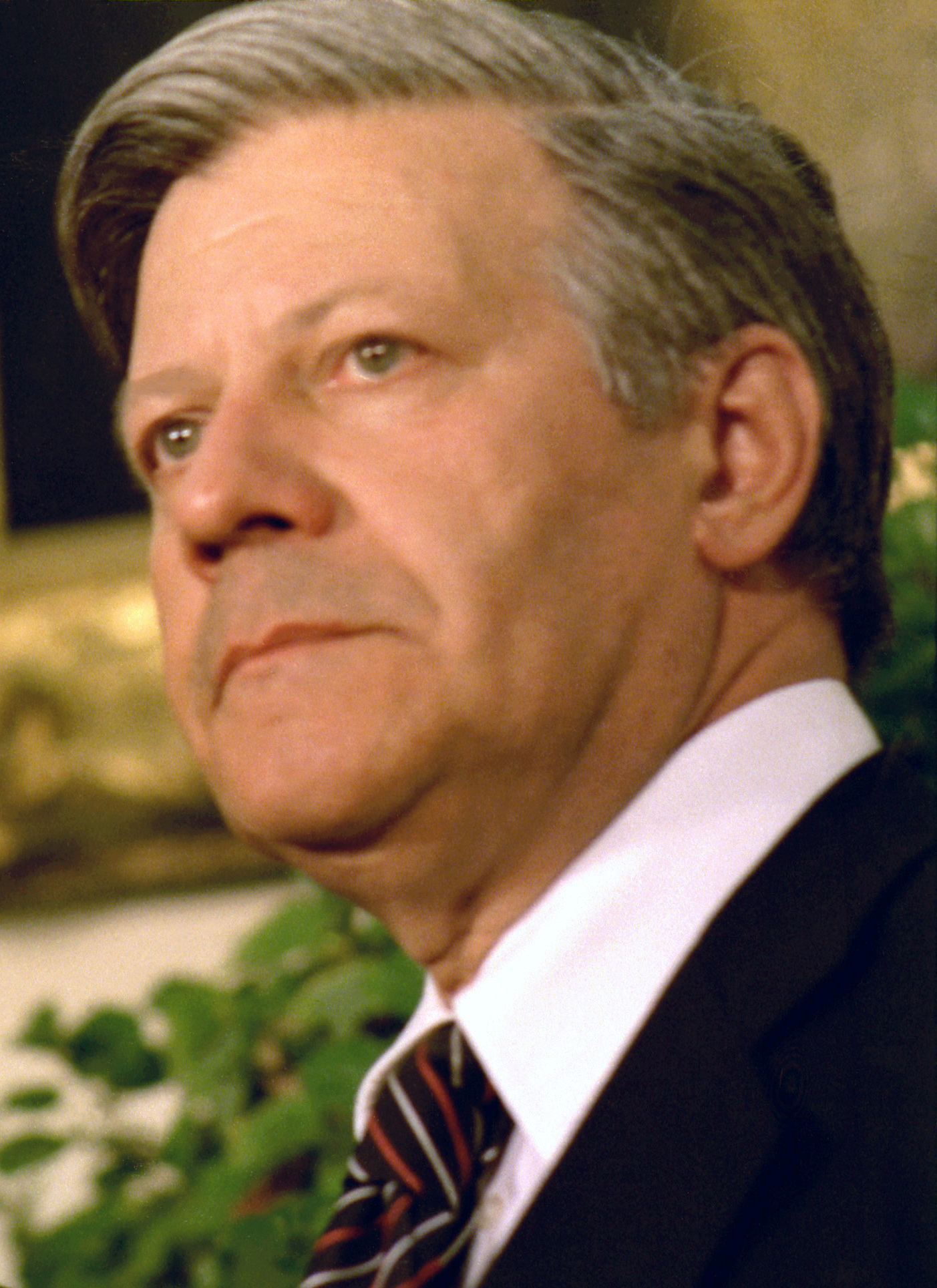
(Germany) Germany
Helmut Schmidt,
Chancellor (Host)

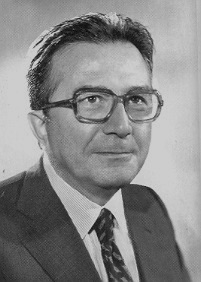
(Italy) Italy
Giulio Andreotti,
Prime Minister

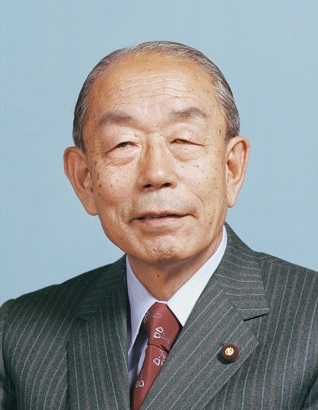
(Japan) Japan
Takeo Fukuda,
Prime Minister

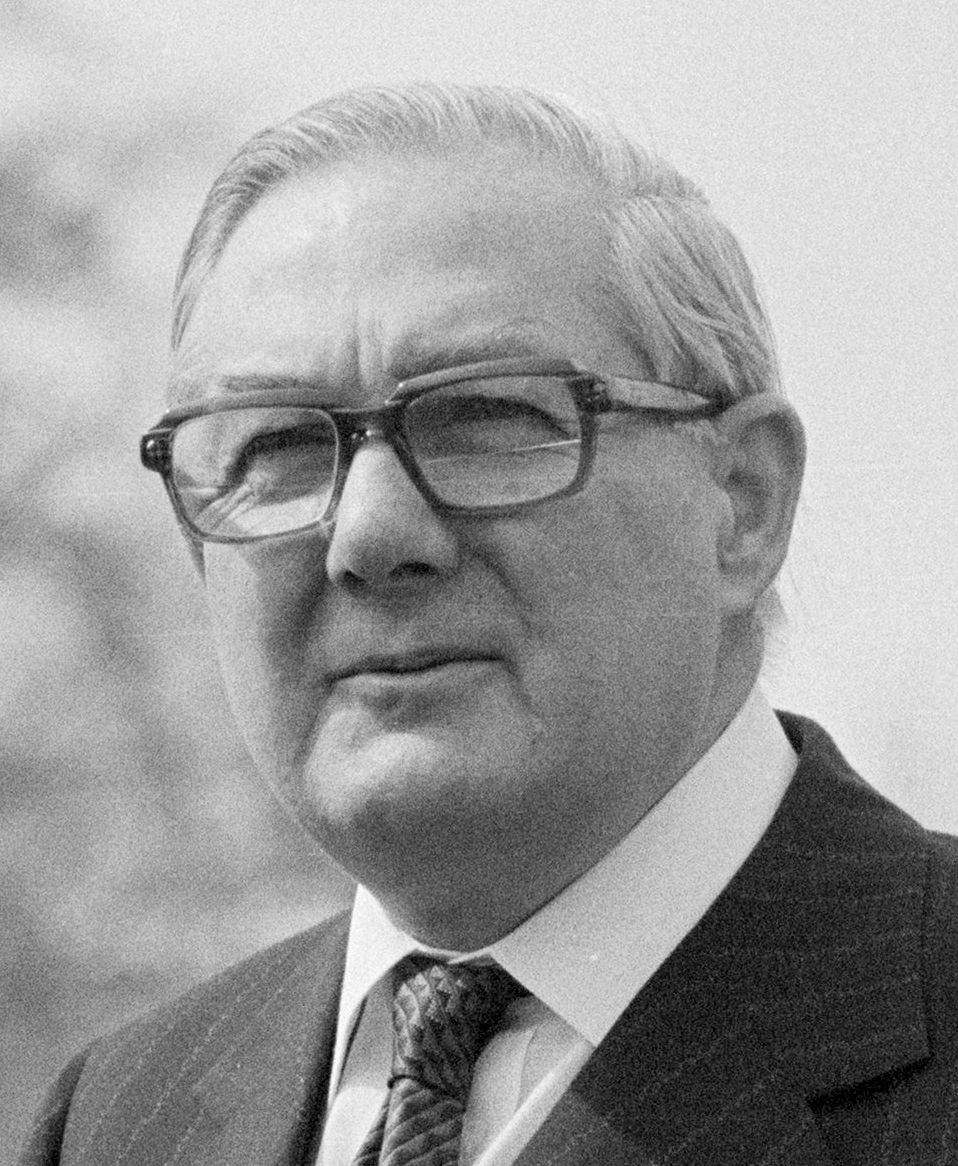
(United Kingdom) United Kingdom
James Callaghan,
Prime Minister

(United States) United States
Jimmy Carter,
President
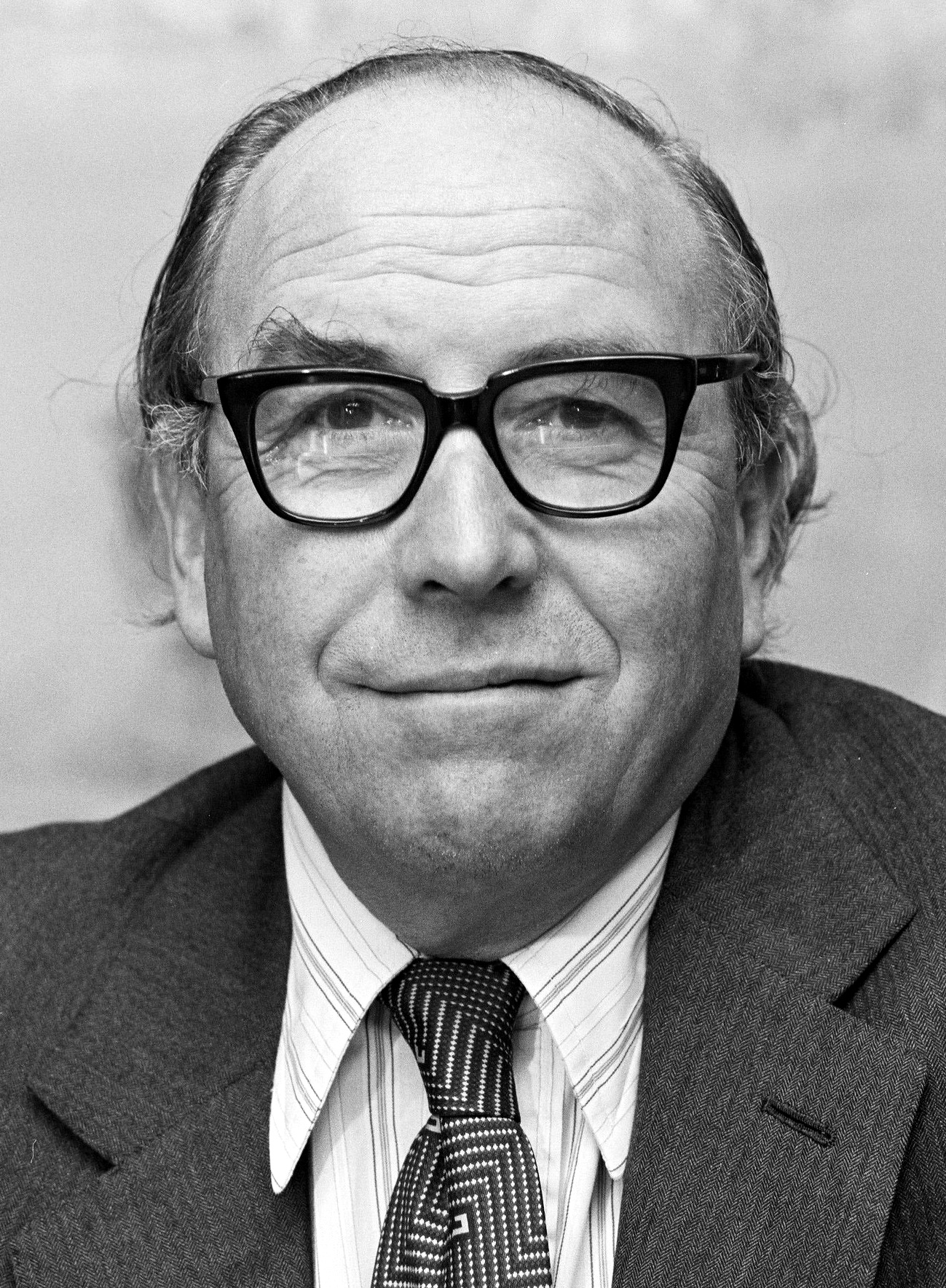
(European Union) European Union
Roy Jenkins, Commission President

== See also ==
- G8
