= 5th G7 summit =

1979 international leader meeting in Japan

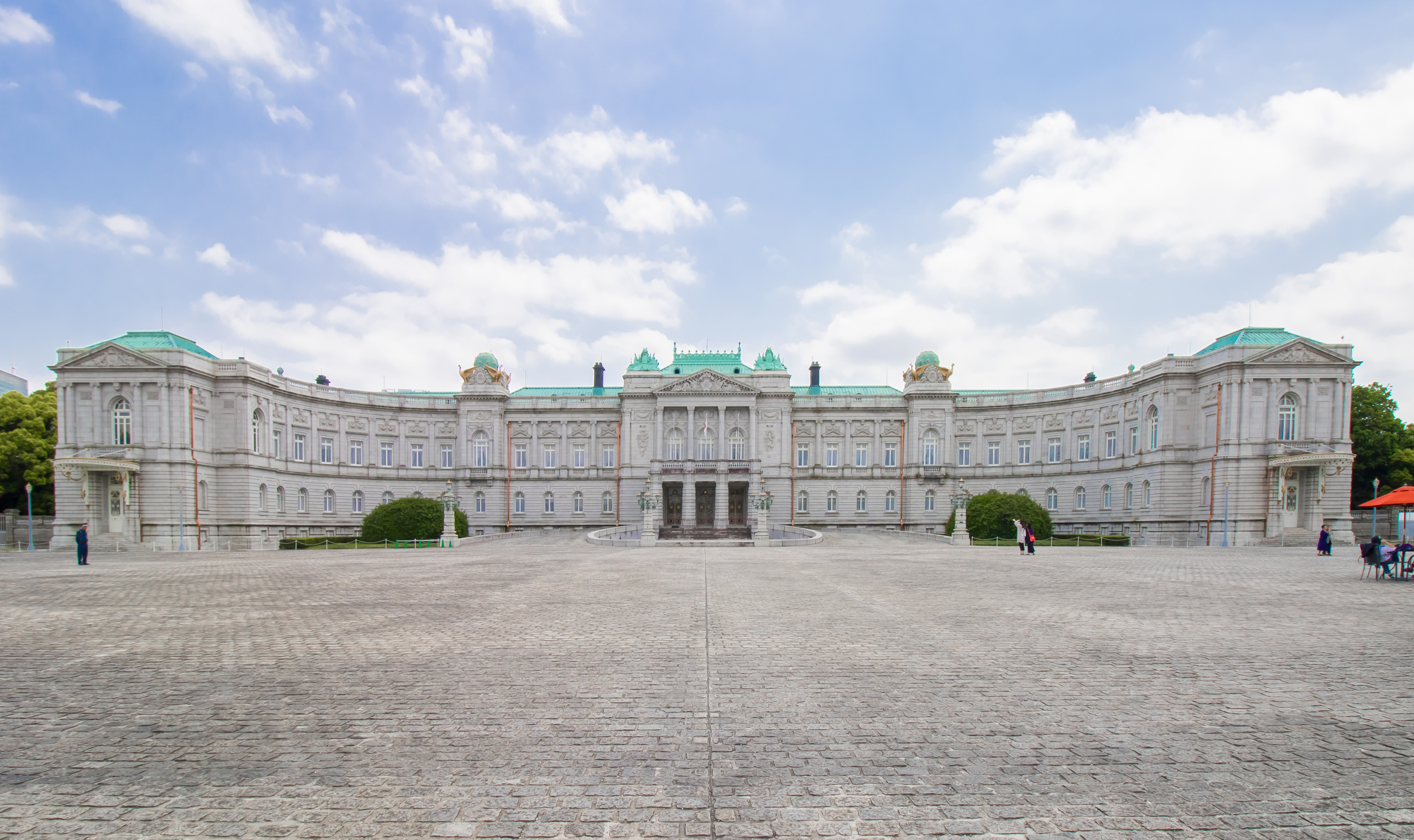
- State Guesthouse, Akasaka Palace
- Host country: Japan
- Dates: June 28–29, 1979
- Cities: Tokyo
- Venues: Akasaka Palace
- Follows: 4th G7 summit
- Precedes: 6th G7 summit

The 5th G7 Summit was held between June 28 and 29, 1979 at the State Guesthouse in Tokyo, Japan.

The Group of Seven (G7) was an unofficial forum which brought together the heads of the richest industrialized countries: France, West Germany, Italy, Japan, the United Kingdom, the United States, Canada (since 1976), and the President of the European Commission (starting officially in 1981). The summits were not meant to be linked formally with wider international institutions; and in fact, a mild rebellion against the stiff formality of other international meetings was a part of the genesis of cooperation between France's president Valéry Giscard d'Estaing and West Germany's chancellor Helmut Schmidt as they conceived the first Group of Six (G6) summit in 1975.

== Leaders at the summit ==
The G7 is an unofficial annual forum for the leaders of Canada, the European Commission, France, Germany, Italy, Japan, the United Kingdom and the United States.

The 5th G7 summit was the first summit for British Prime Minister Margaret Thatcher. It was also the first and only summit for Canadian Prime Minister Joe Clark and Japanese Prime Minister Masayoshi Ohira.

=== Participants ===
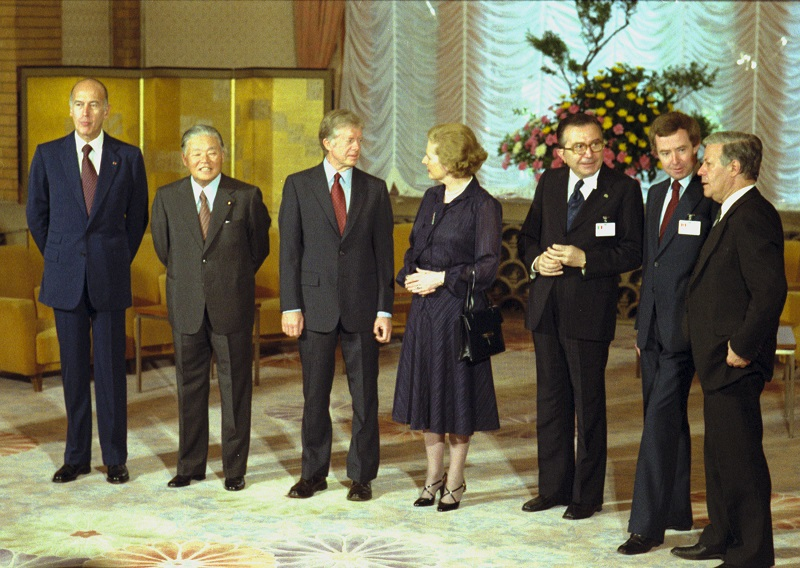
Group shot of world leaders attending the Economic Summit (l to r): France (V. Giscard d'Estain), Japan (Masayoshi Ohira), US (Jimmy Carter), UK (Margaret Thatcher), Italy (Giulio Andreotti), and Canada (Joe Clark), W Germany (Helmut Schmidt)

These summit participants are the current "core members" of the international forum:

**Core G7 members** Host state and leader are shown in bold text.
Member		Represented by	Title
(Canada)	Canada	Joe Clark	Prime Minister
(France)	France	Valéry Giscard d'Estaing	President
(West Germany)	West Germany	Helmut Schmidt	Chancellor
(Italy)	Italy	Giulio Andreotti	Prime Minister
(Japan)	**Japan**	**Masayoshi Ōhira**	**Prime Minister**
(United Kingdom)	United Kingdom	Margaret Thatcher	Prime Minister
(United States)	United States	Jimmy Carter	President
(European Union)	European Community	Roy Jenkins	Commission President
(European Union)	European Community	Valéry Giscard d'Estaing	Council President

== Issues ==
The summit was intended as a venue for resolving differences among its members. As a practical matter, the summit was also conceived as an opportunity for its members to give each other mutual encouragement in the face of difficult economic decisions. Coming amidst the "second oil shock" caused by the Iranian Revolution, the summit became devoted to the problem of energy, according to historian Daniel Yergin. "It was also a very nasty one. Tempers were badly frayed." US President Jimmy Carter stated that West German Chancellor Helmut Schmidt "got personally abusive toward me .... He alleged that American interference in the Middle East trying to work for a peace treaty was what had cause the problems with oil all over the world."

== Gallery of participating leaders ==
=== Core G7 participants ===
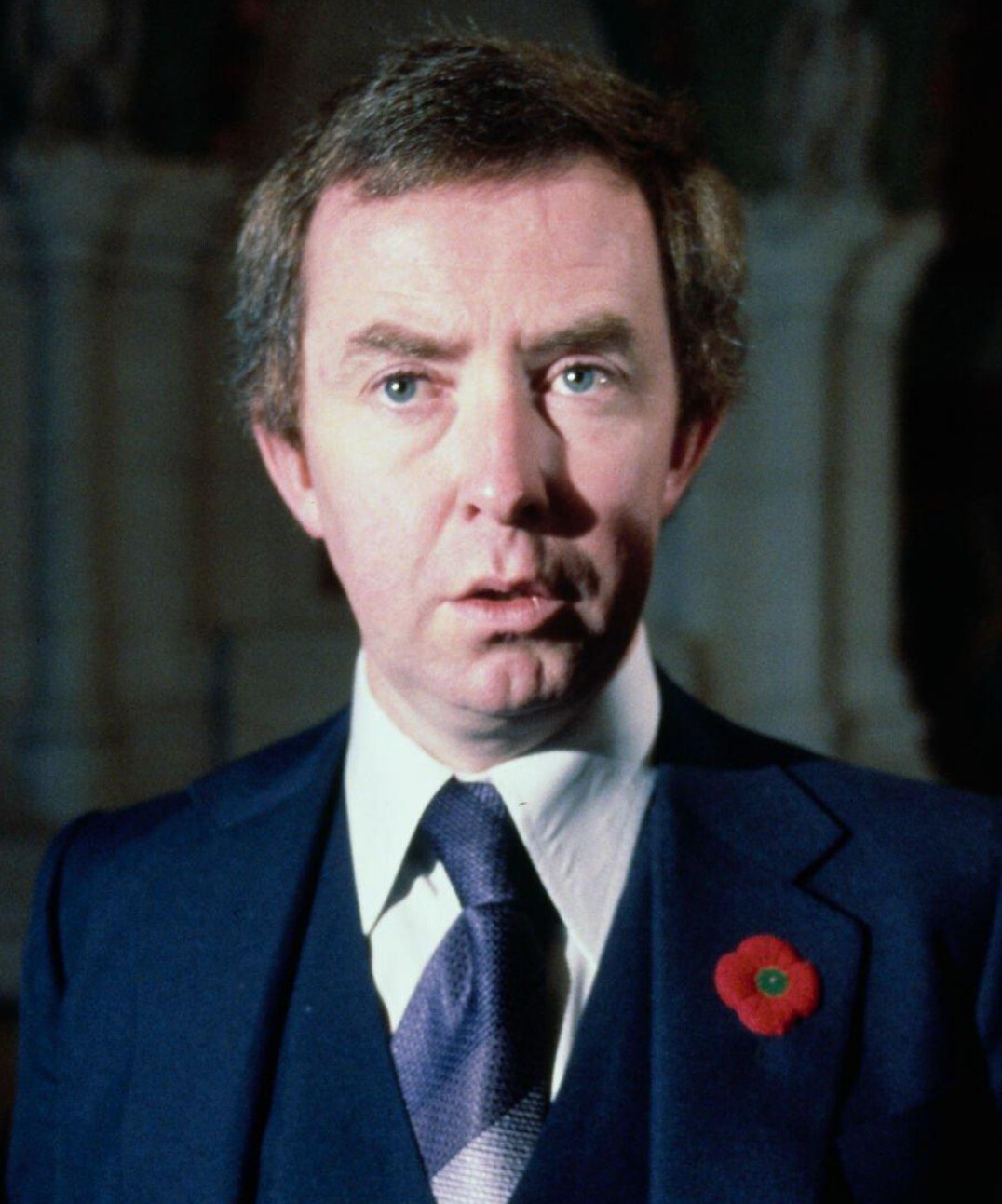
(Canada) Canada
Joe Clark,
Prime Minister

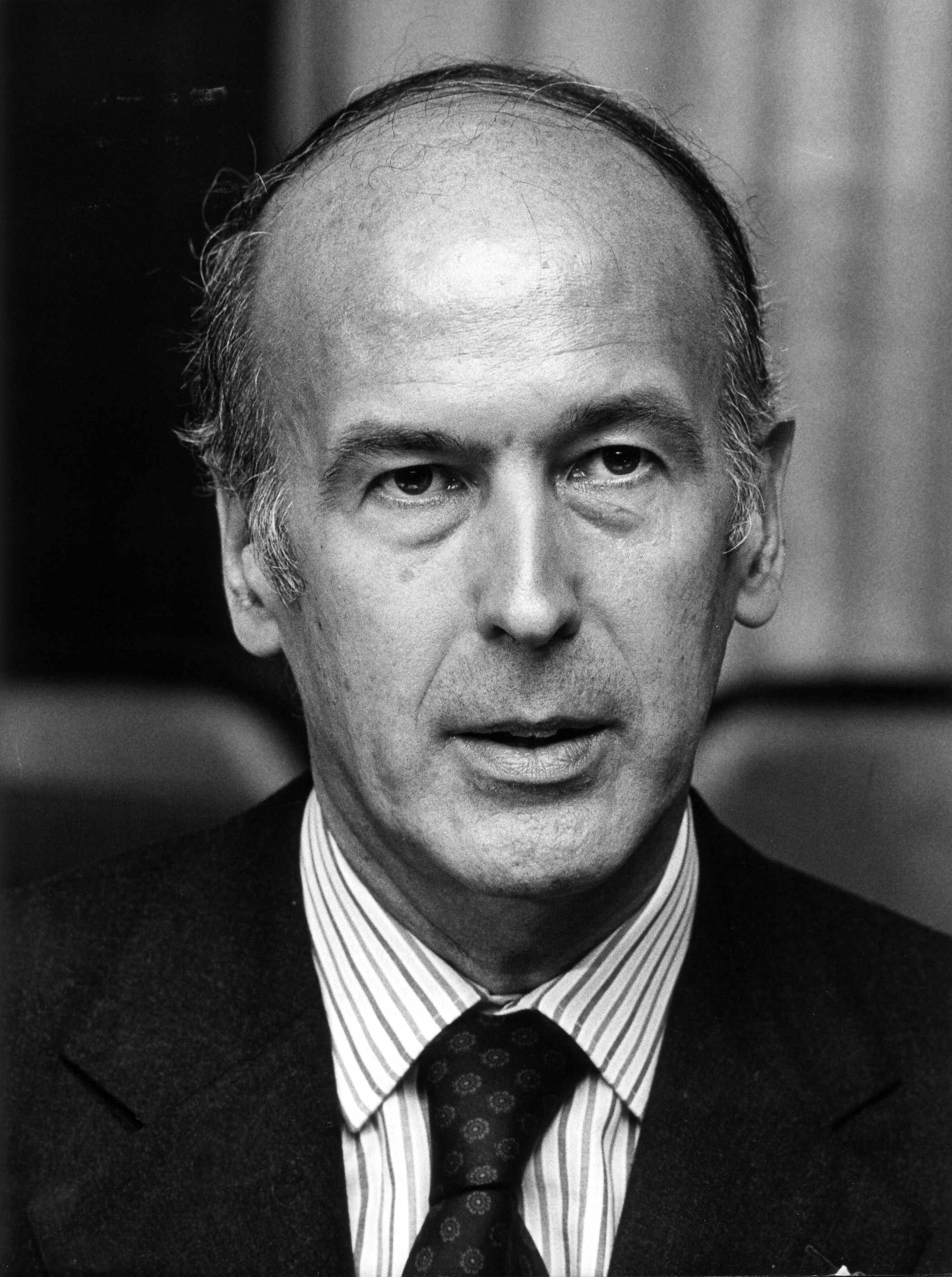
(France) France
Valéry Giscard d'Estaing,
President

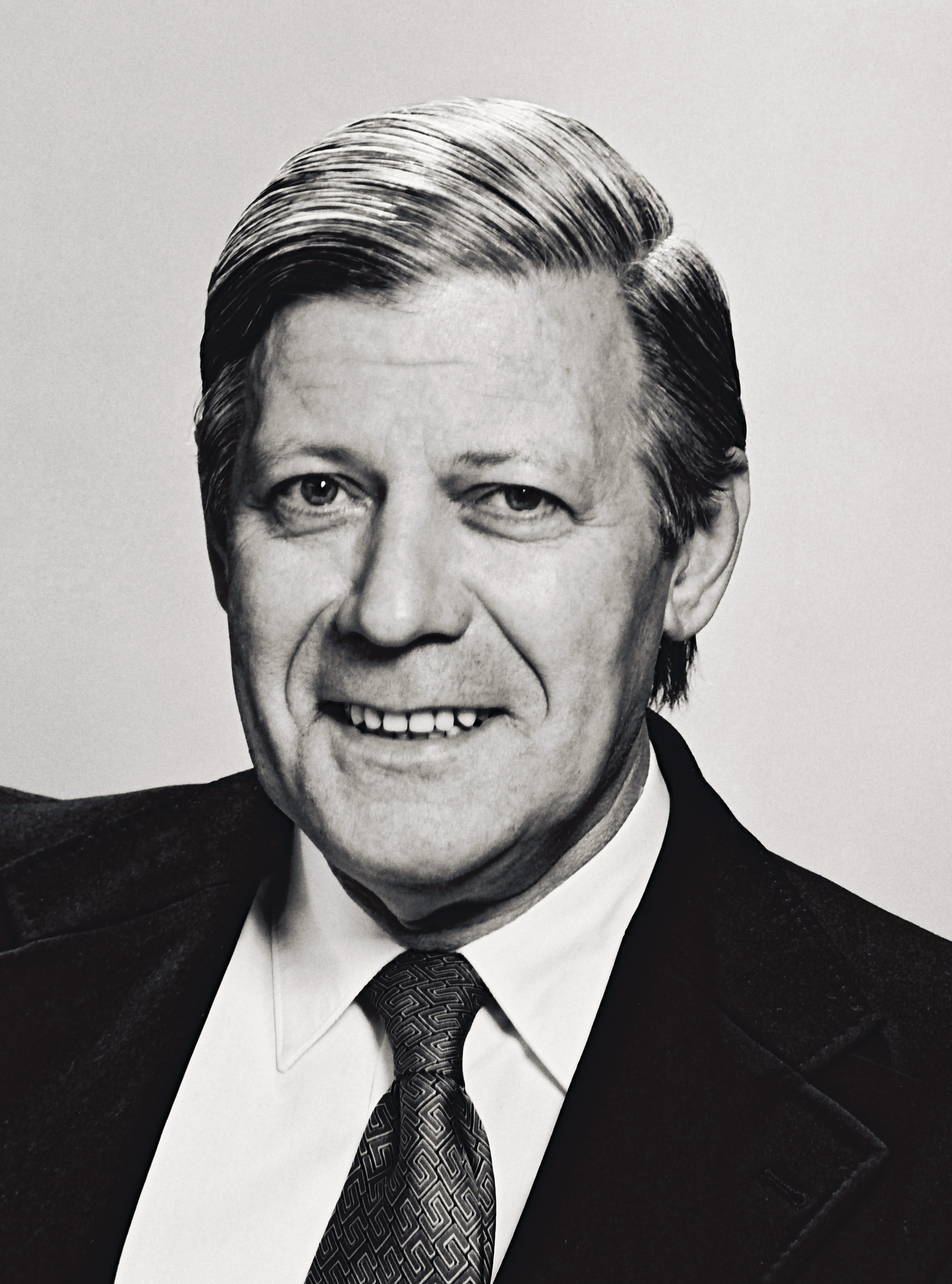
(Germany) Germany
Helmut Schmidt,
Chancellor

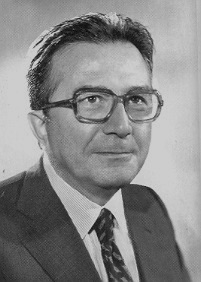
(Italy) Italy
Giulio Andreotti,
Prime Minister

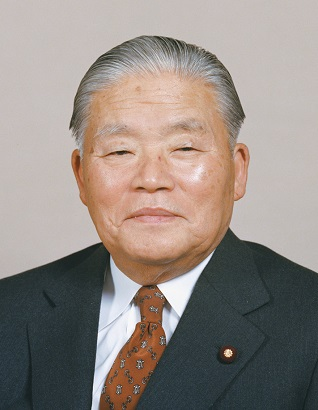
(Japan) Japan
Masayoshi Ōhira,
Prime Minister (Host)

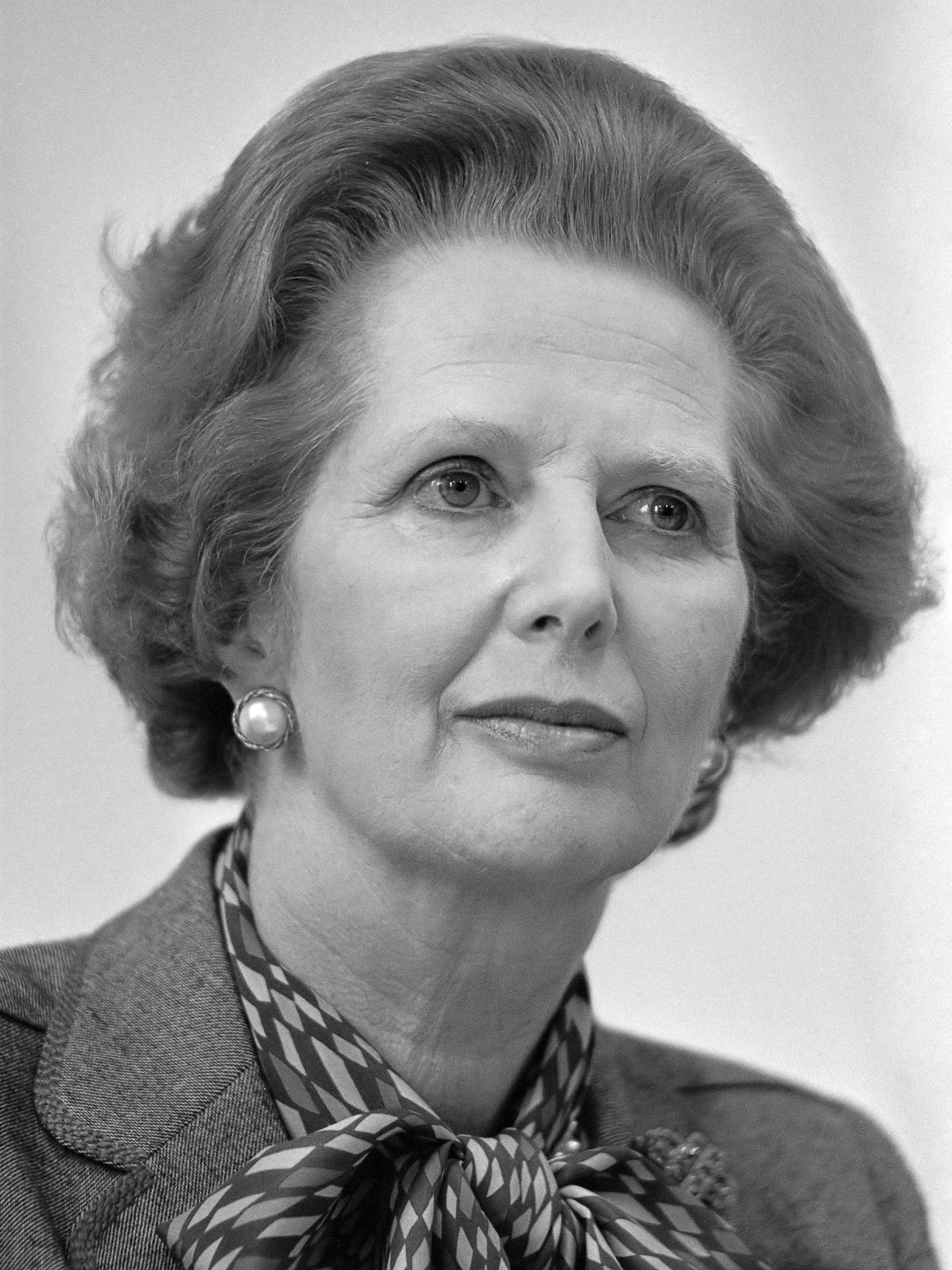
(United Kingdom) United Kingdom
Margaret Thatcher,
Prime Minister

(United States) United States
Jimmy Carter,
President
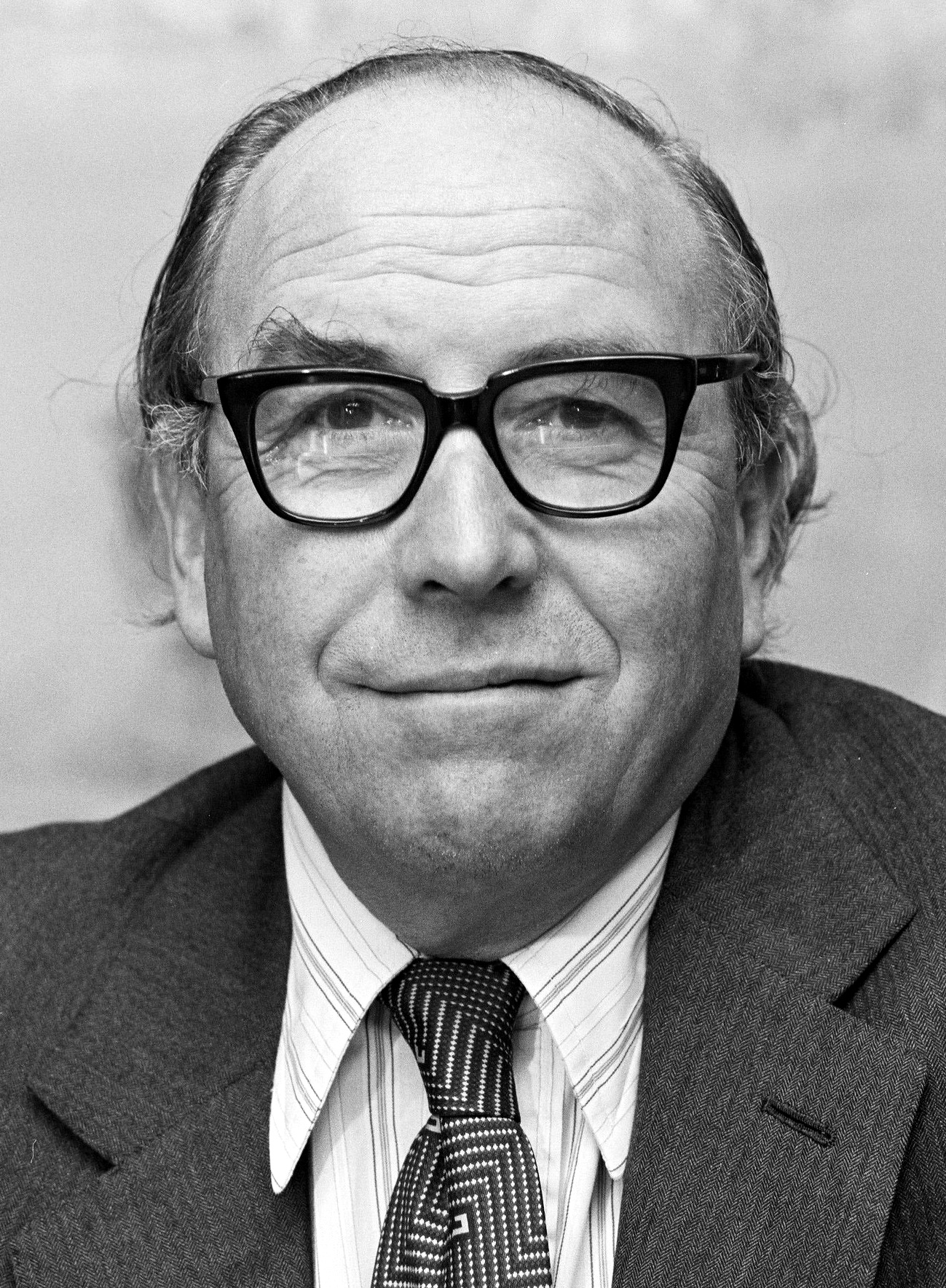
(European Union) European Union
Roy Jenkins,
Commission President

== See also ==
- G8
