= 3rd G7 summit =

1977 international leader meeting in England

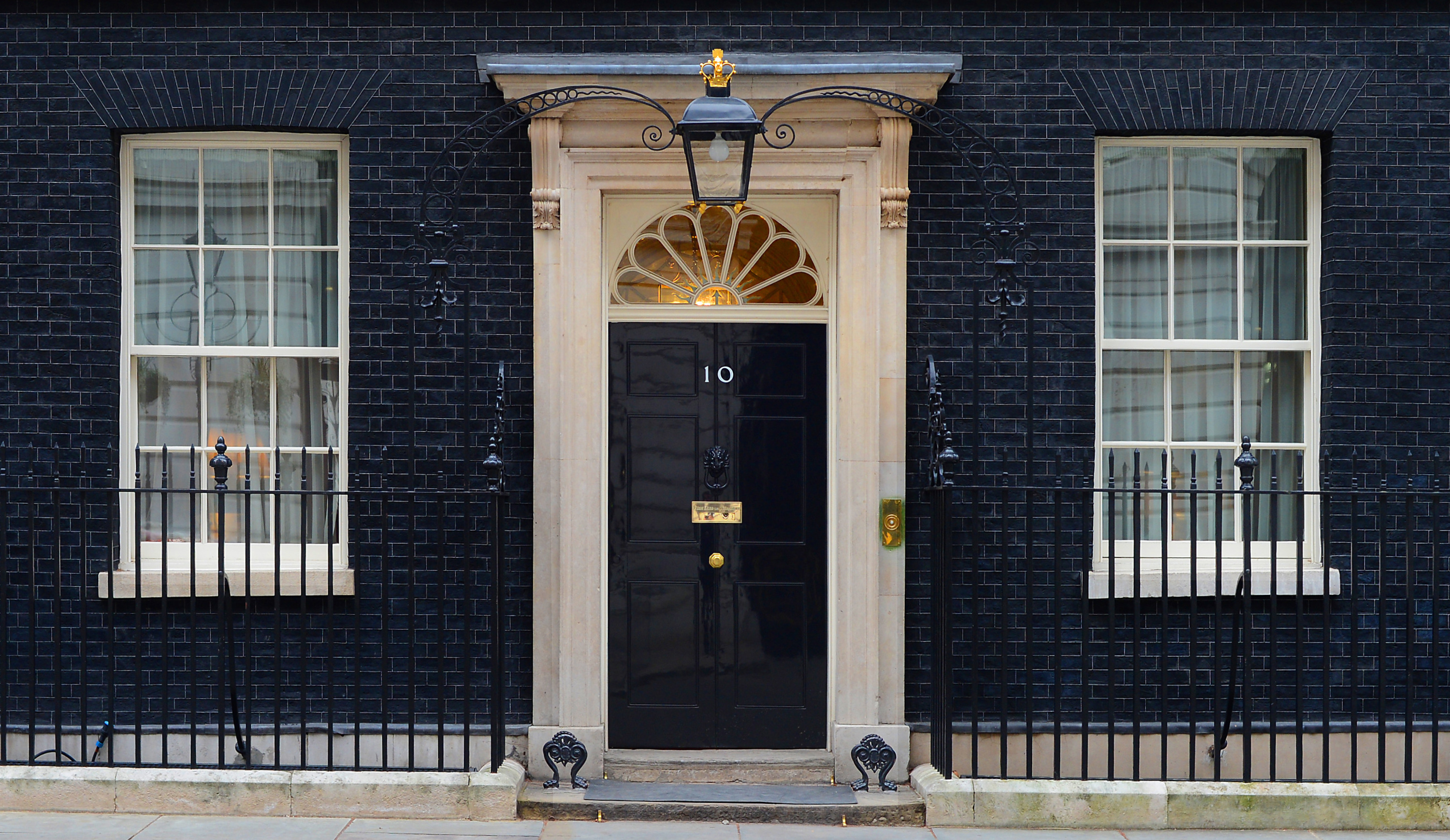
- 10 Downing Street in London, home of the British prime minister
- Host country: United Kingdom
- Dates: 7–8 May 1977
- Cities: London
- Venues: 10 Downing Street
- Participants: (Canada) Pierre Trudeau (Prime Minister); (France) Valéry Giscard d'Estaing (President); (West Germany) Helmut Schmidt (Chancellor); (Italy) Giulio Andreotti Prime Minister); (Japan) Takeo Fukuda (Prime Minister); (United Kingdom) James Callaghan (Prime Minister) (host); (United States) Jimmy Carter (President); (European Union) Roy Jenkins (Commission President); (European Union) James Callaghan (Council President)
- Follows: 2nd G7 summit
- Precedes: 4th G7 summit

The 3rd G7 Summit was held at No. 10 Downing Street in London, England, between 7–8 May 1977.

The Group of Seven (G7) was an unofficial forum which brought together the heads of the richest industrialized countries: France, West Germany, Italy, Japan, the United Kingdom, the United States, Canada (since 1976), and the President of the European Commission (starting officially in 1981). The summits were not meant to be linked formally with wider international institutions; and in fact, a mild rebellion against the stiff formality of other international meetings was a part of the genesis of cooperation between France's president Valéry Giscard d'Estaing and West Germany's chancellor Helmut Schmidt as they conceived the first Group of Six (G6) summit in 1975.

This was the initial meeting in which the President of the European Commission was formally invited to take a part.

== Leaders at the summit ==
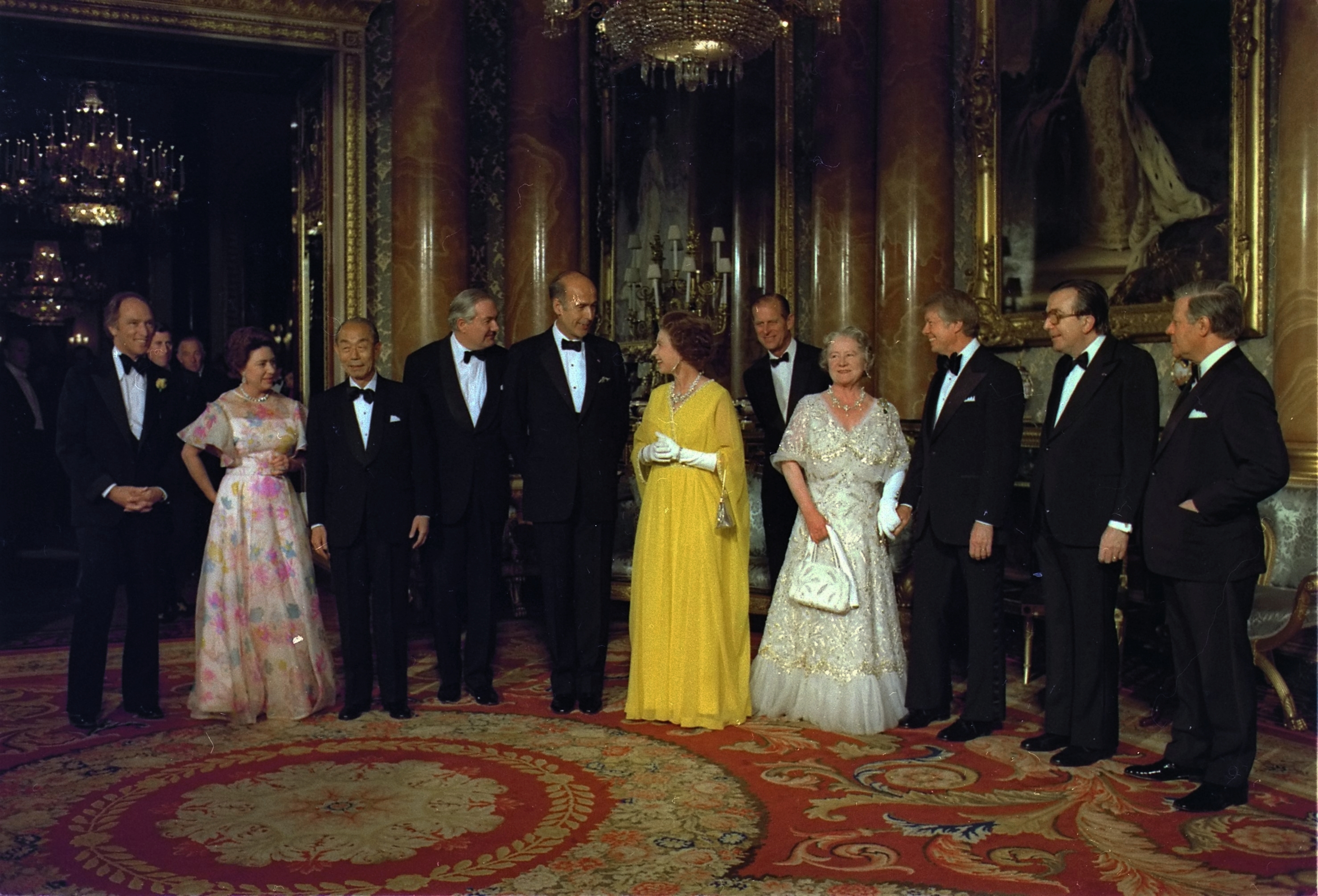
G7 leaders and members of the British royal family, in London, 13 May 1977. Left to right: Pierre Trudeau (Charles, Prince of Wales, far background); Princess Margaret, Countess of Snowdon; Takeo Fukuda; James Callaghan; Valéry Giscard d'Estaing; Queen Elizabeth II; Prince Philip, Duke of Edinburgh; Queen Elizabeth The Queen Mother; Jimmy Carter; Giulio Andreotti; Helmut Schmidt

The G7 is an unofficial annual forum for the leaders of Canada, the European Commission, France, Germany, Italy, Japan, the United Kingdom, and the United States.

The 3rd G7 summit was the first summit for Italian Prime Minister Giulio Andreotti, Japanese Prime Minister Takeo Fukuda, and US President Jimmy Carter.

=== Participants ===
These summit participants are the current "core members" of the international forum:

**Core G7 members** Host state and leader are shown in bold text.
Member		Represented by	Title
(Canada)	Canada	Pierre Trudeau	Prime Minister
(France)	France	Valéry Giscard d'Estaing	President
(West Germany)	West Germany	Helmut Schmidt	Chancellor
(Italy)	Italy	Giulio Andreotti	Prime Minister
(Japan)	Japan	Takeo Fukuda	Prime Minister
(United Kingdom)	**United Kingdom**	**James Callaghan**	**Prime Minister**
(United States)	United States	Jimmy Carter	President
(European Union)	European Community	Roy Jenkins	Commission President
(European Union)	European Community	**James Callaghan**	Council President

== Issues ==
The summit was intended as a venue for resolving differences among its members. As a practical matter, the summit was also conceived as an opportunity for its members to give each other mutual encouragement in the face of difficult economic decisions.

== Accomplishments ==
The leaders came out with the Downing Street Summit Declaration.

== Gallery of participating leaders ==
=== Core G7 participants ===
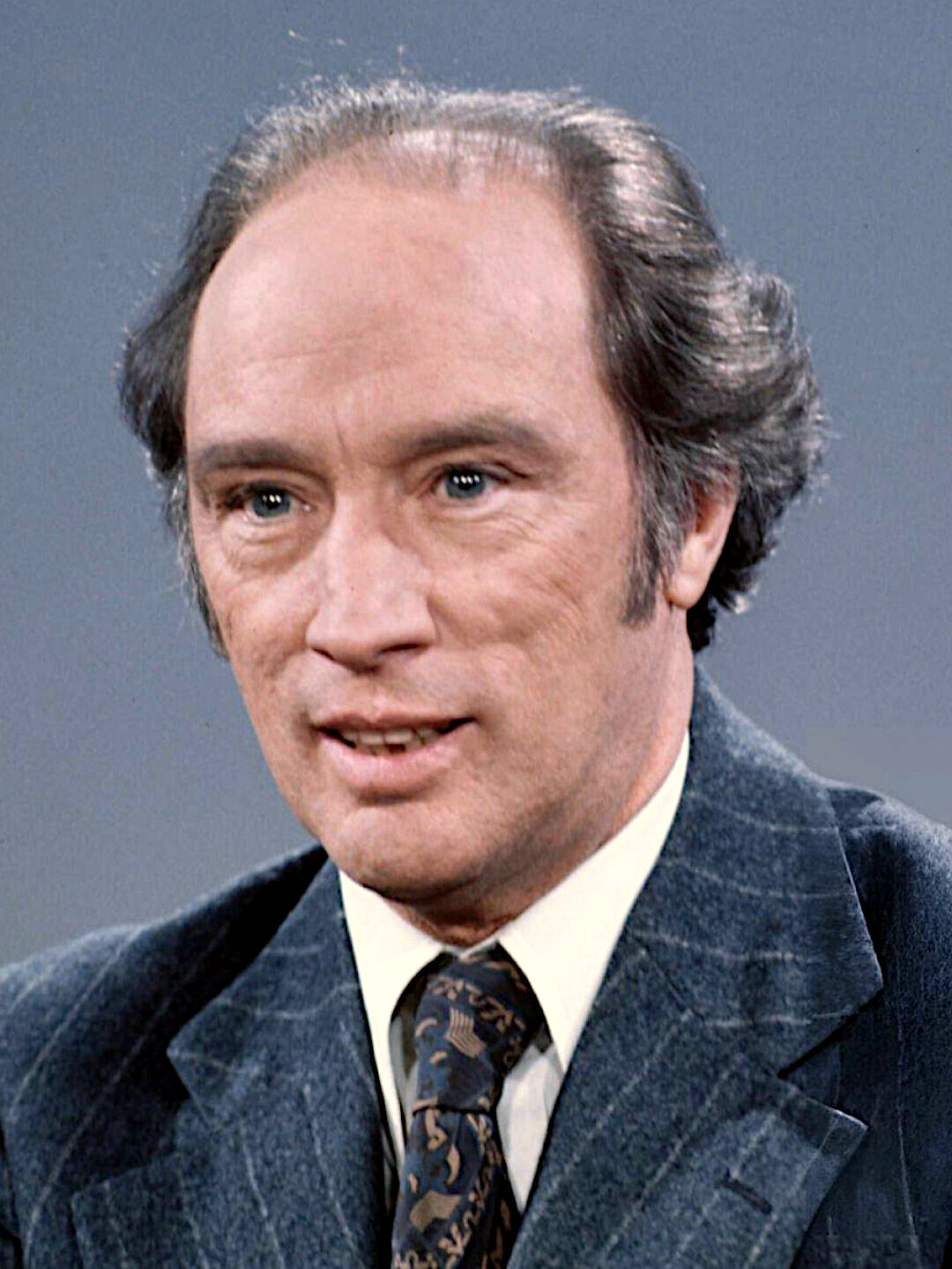
(Canada) Canada
Pierre Trudeau,
Prime Minister

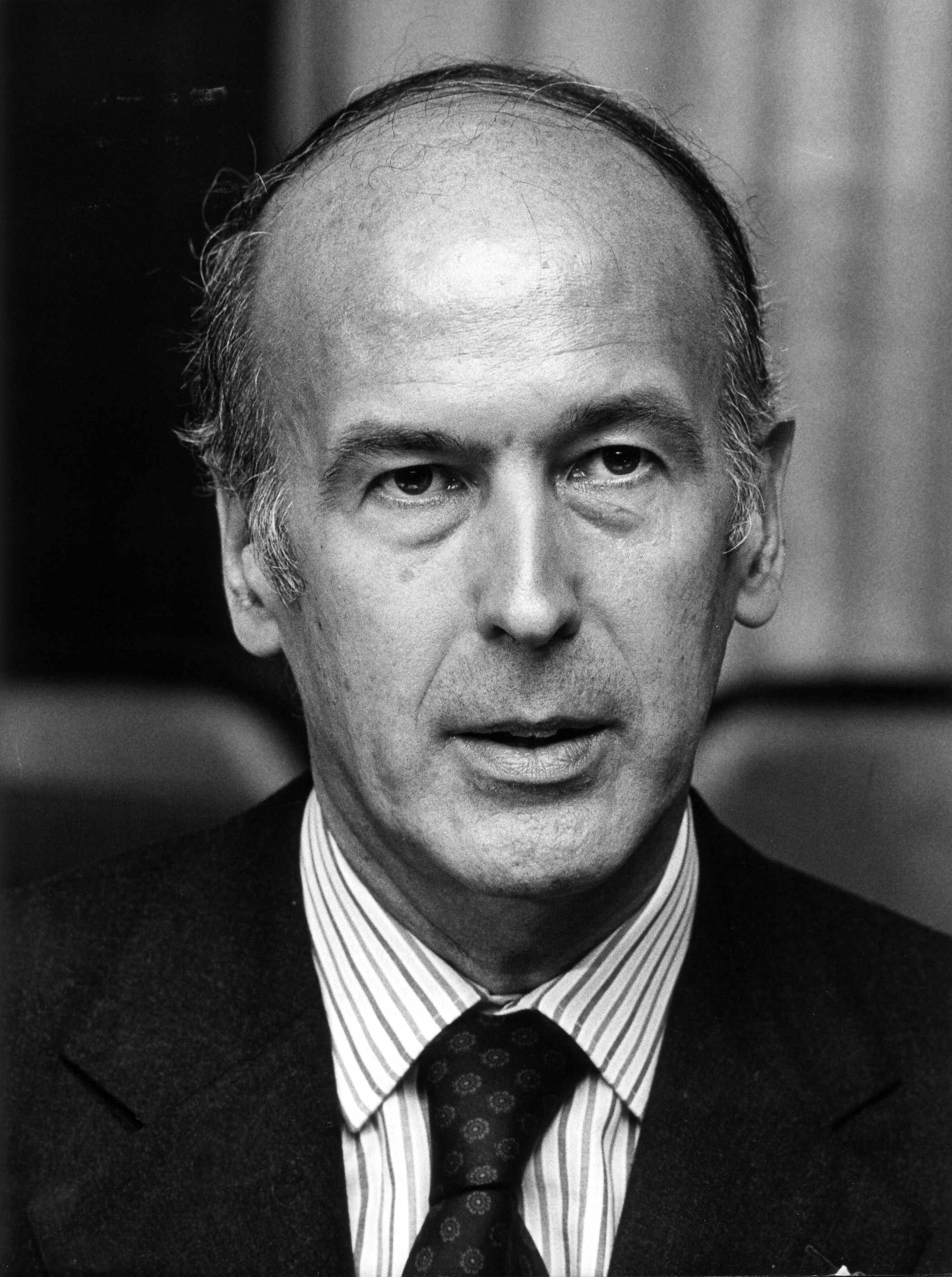
(France) France
Valéry Giscard d'Estaing,
President

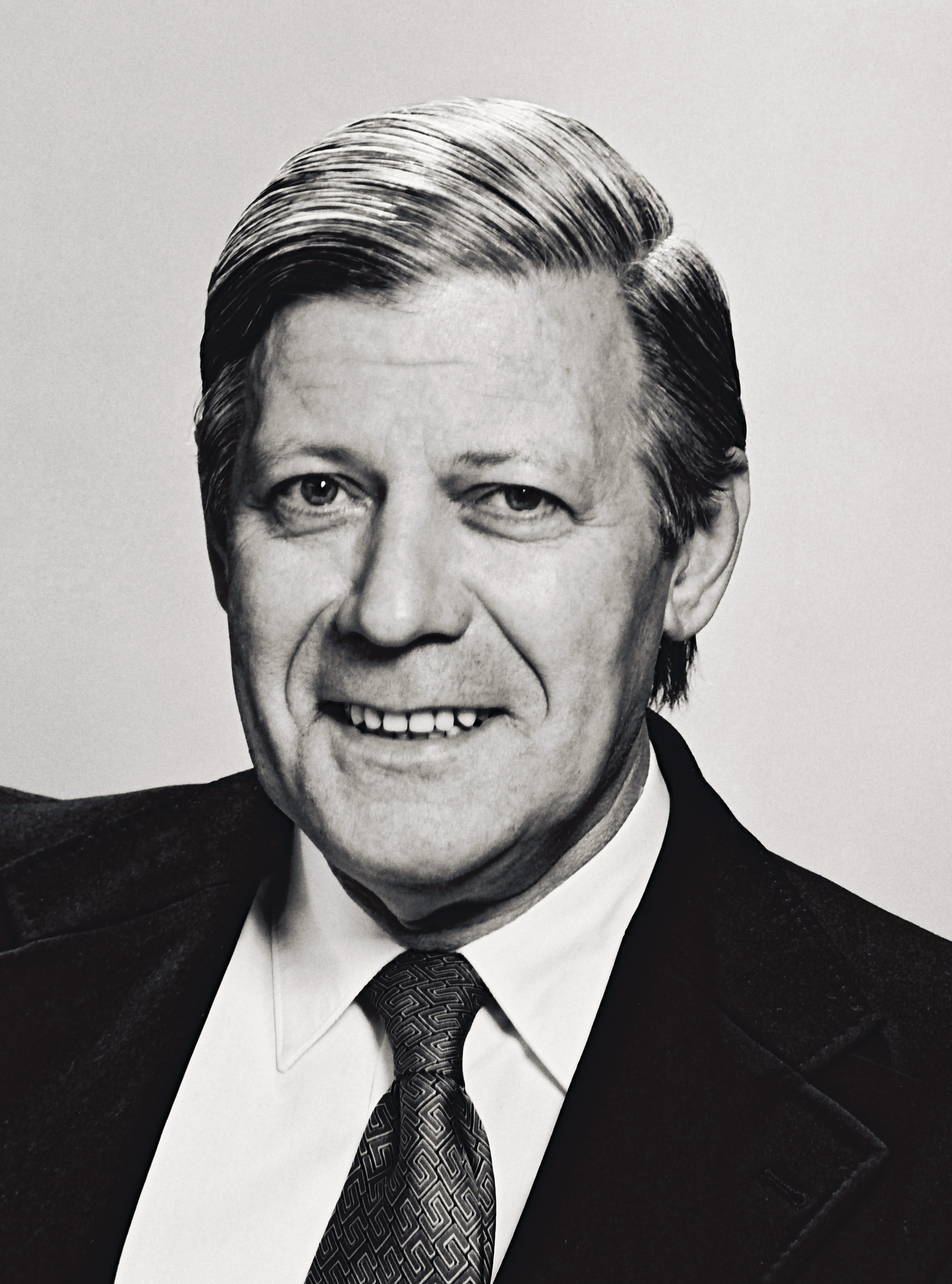
(Germany) Germany
Helmut Schmidt,
Chancellor

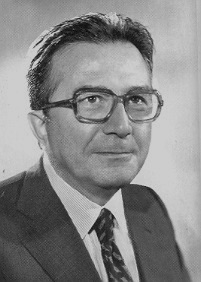
(Italy) Italy
Giulio Andreotti,
Prime Minister

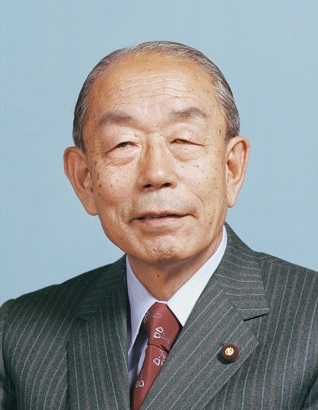
(Japan) Japan
Takeo Fukuda,
Prime Minister

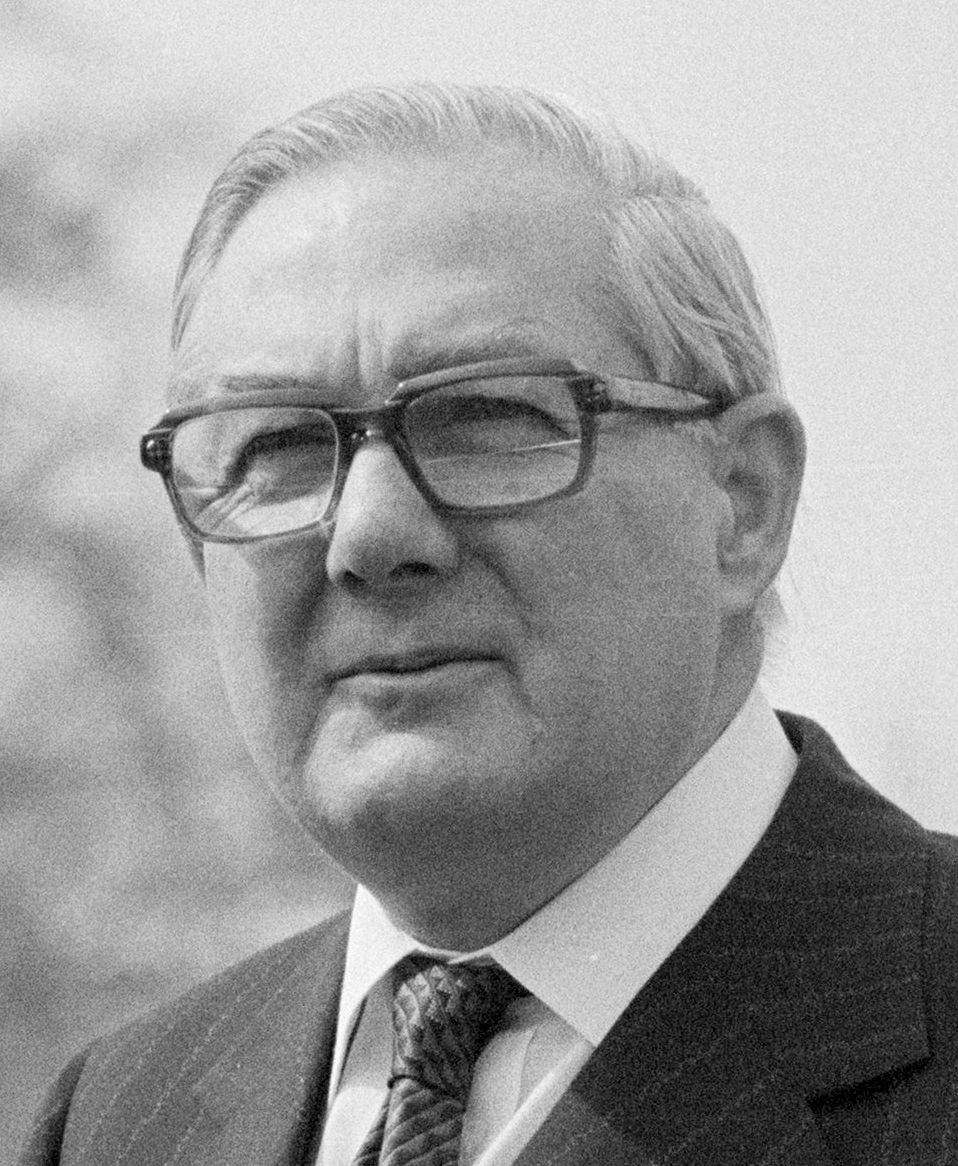
United Kingdom
James Callaghan,
Prime Minister (Host)

(United States) United States
Jimmy Carter,
President
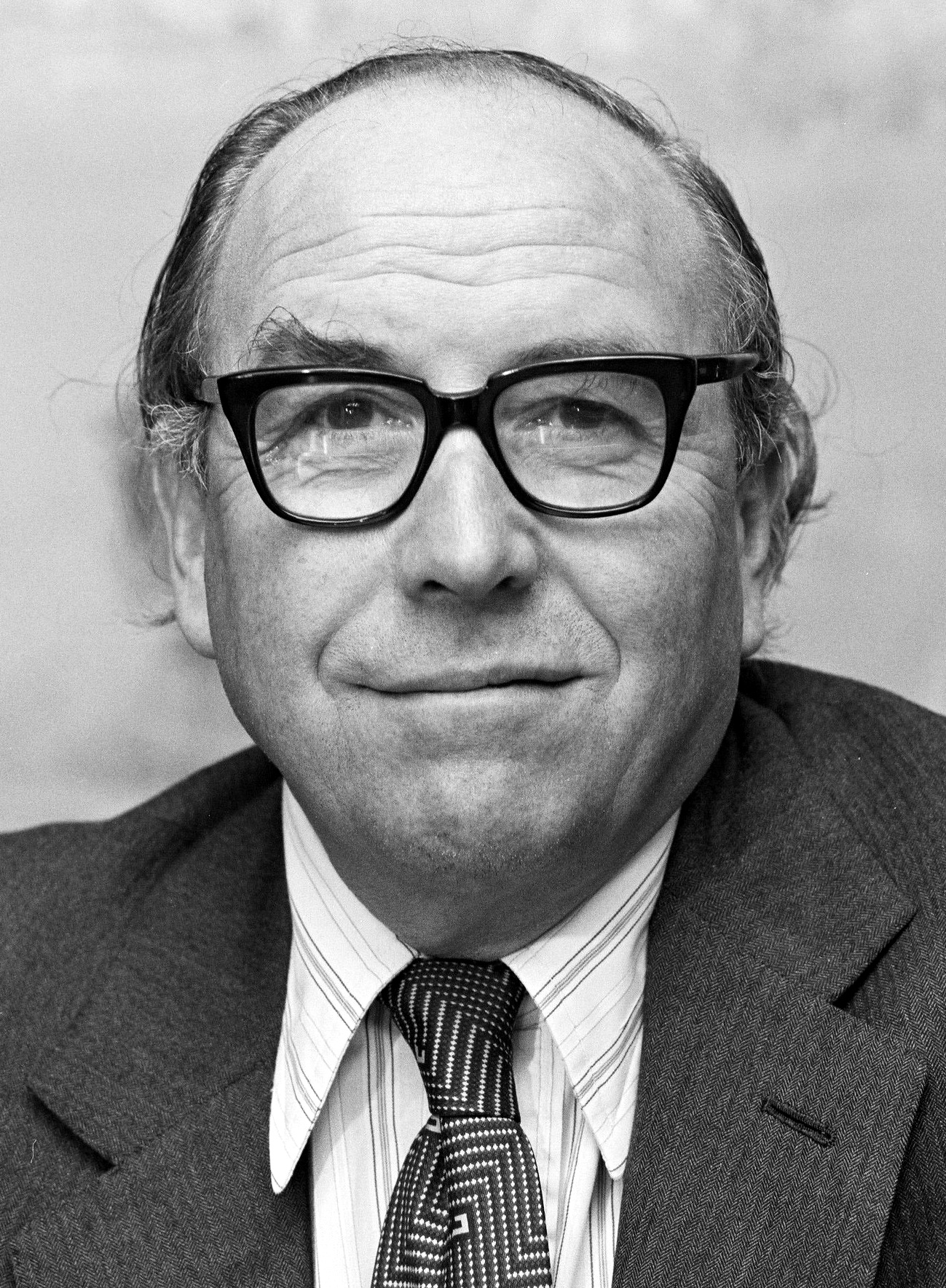
(European Union) European Union
Roy Jenkins, Commission President

== See also ==
- G8
