= 1977 London NATO summit =

1977 NATO summit meeting in London, England

London summit
- Host country: United Kingdom
- Dates: 10–11 May 1977

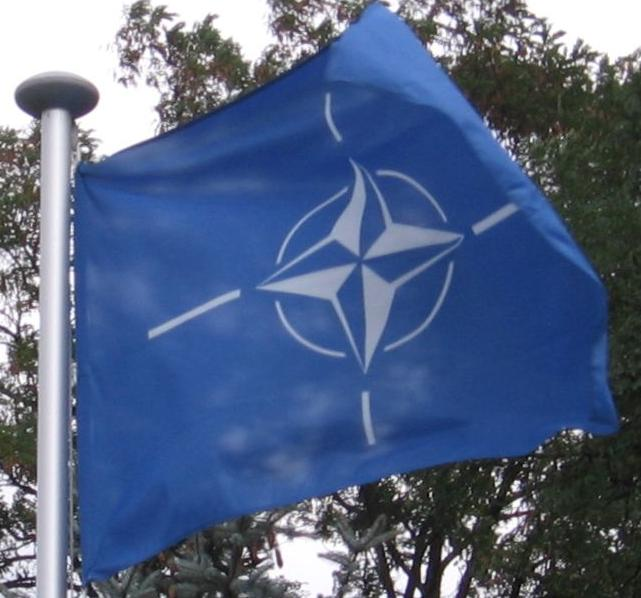
NATO flag

The 1977 London summit was the 4th NATO summit bringing the leaders of member nations together at the same time. The formal sessions and informal meetings in London took place on 10–11 May 1977. This event was only the fifth meeting of the NATO heads of state following the ceremonial signing of the North Atlantic Treaty on 4 April 1949.

== Background ==
In this period, the organization faced unresolved questions concerned whether a new generation of leaders would be as committed to NATO as their predecessors had been.

== See also ==
- EU summit
- G8 summit
