= List of international prime ministerial trips made by Brian Mulroney =

Brian Mulroney, the 18th prime minister of Canada, made 19 international trips to 11 countries during his premiership from September 17, 1984 to June 25, 1993.

== 1984 ==
#	Country	Location	Date	Details	Image
1	United States	Washington, D.C.	September 25	Official visit. Met with President Ronald Reagan to discuss bilateral relations and trade.	

== 1985 ==
#	Country	Location	Date	Details	Image
1	Soviet Union	Moscow	March	Attended the state funeral of Konstantin Chernenko. Met with Mikhail Gorbachev and Andrei Gromyko.	
2	West Germany	Bonn	May 2–4	Attended the 11th G7 summit.	

== 1986 ==
#	Country	Location	Date	Details	Image
1	United States	Washington, D.C.	March 18	Official visit.	
2	Japan	Tokyo	May 4–6	Attended the 12th G7 summit.	
3	China	Beijing	May 9–10	Official visit.	
4	South Korea	Seoul	May 14	Official visit.	
5	United Kingdom	London	August 3–5	Attended 1986 Commonwealth Heads of Government Meeting.	

== 1987 ==
#	Country	Location	Date	Details	Image
1	Italy	Venice	June 8–10	Attended the 13th G7 summit.	

== 1988 ==
#	Country	Location	Date	Details	Image
1	United States	Washington, D.C.	April 27	Official visit.	

== 1989 ==
#	Country	Location	Date	Details	Image
1	France	Paris	July 14–16	Attended Bastille Day celebrations and the 15th G7 summit.	
2	Soviet Union	Moscow, Leningrad, Kiev	November 20–25	Official visit. Met with President Mikhail Gorbachev, Premier Nikolai Ryzhkov and Foreign Minister Eduard Shevardnadze. Met with Ukrainian Communist Party First Secretary Vladimir Ivashko.	
3	United States	Washington, D.C.	November 26	Met with President George H. W. Bush.	

== 1990 ==
#	Country	Location	Date	Details	Image
1	United States	Houston	July 9–11	Attended the 16th G7 summit.	

== 1991 ==
#	Country	Location	Date	Details	Image
1	Ireland	Dublin	July 10–13	Official visit.	
2	United Kingdom	London	July 14–17	Attended the 17th G7 summit.	

== 1992 ==
#	Country	Location	Date	Details	Image
1	Germany	Munich	July 6–8	Attended the 18th G7 summit.	
2	United States	San Antonio	October 7	Initialed the NAFTA agreement.	

== 1993 ==
#	Country	Location	Date	Details	Image
1	United States	Washington, D. C.	February 4–5	Met with President Bill Clinton.	
2	Russia	Moscow	May 6–9	Official visit.	
3	United Kingdom	London	May 11	Official visit.	
4	United States	Washington, D. C.	June 1–2	Met with President Bill Clinton.	

== Multilateral meetings ==
Multilateral meetings of the following intergovernmental organizations took place during his premiership.

Group	Year							
Group	1985	1986	1987	1988	1989	1990	1991	1992
G7	May 2–4, (West Germany) Bonn	May 4–6, (Japan) Tokyo	June 8–10, (Italy) Venice	July 20–21, (Canada) Toronto	July 14–16, (France) Paris	July 9–11, (United States) Houston	July 15–17, (United Kingdom) London	July 6–8, (Germany) Munich
NATO	November 21, (Belgium) Brussels	none	none	March 2–3, (Belgium) Brussels	May 29–30, (Belgium) Brussels	July 5–6, (United Kingdom) London	November 7–8, (Italy) Rome	none
NATO	November 21, (Belgium) Brussels	none	none	March 2–3, (Belgium) Brussels	December 4, (Belgium) Brussels	July 5–6, (United Kingdom) London	November 7–8, (Italy) Rome	none
OSCE	none	none	none	none	November 19–21, (France) Paris	none	none	July 9–10, (Finland) Helsinki
OIF	none	February 17–19, (France) Versailles, Yvelines	September 2–4, (Canada) Quebec	none	May 24–26, (Senegal) Dakar	none	November 19–21, (France) Paris	none
CHOGM	October 16–22, (The Bahamas) Nassau	August 3–5, (United Kingdom) London	October 13–17, (Canada) Vancouver	None	October 18–24, (Malaysia) Kuala Lumpur	None	October 16–21, (Zimbabwe) Harare	None

== See also ==
- Foreign relations of Canada
- List of international prime ministerial trips made by Kim Campbell, his successor
