= 1987 Commonwealth Heads of Government Meeting =

1987 meeting of Commonwealth leaders in Canada

10th Commonwealth Heads of Government Meeting
- Host country: Canada
- Dates: 13–17 October 1987
- Cities: Vancouver and Kelowna
- Venues: Lake Okanagan Resort (retreat)
- Participants: 45
- Heads of State or Government: 37
- Chair: Brian Mulroney (Prime Minister)
- Follows: 1986
- Precedes: 1989

Key points
- Apartheid and economic sanctions Fiji's Commonwealth membership Vancouver Declaration on World Trade

The 1987 Commonwealth Heads of Government Meeting, also known as CHOGM 1987, was the tenth Commonwealth Heads of Government Meeting of the Commonwealth of Nations. It was held in Vancouver, Canada, from 13 to 17 October 1987, and was chaired by Canadian Prime Minister Brian Mulroney. A retreat was held at Lake Okanagan Resort near Kelowna, British Columbia.

The meeting was attended by British Prime Minister Margaret Thatcher and other Commonwealth leaders who disagreed over economic sanctions against apartheid South Africa. The summit adopted the Okanagan Statement on Southern Africa and the Vancouver Declaration on World Trade. Leaders also discussed the political crisis in Fiji.

Forty-five Commonwealth countries were represented, including 37 at head-of-government level.

== South Africa ==
At the 1985 Commonwealth Heads of Government Meeting in Nassau and the 1986 special meeting in London, Commonwealth leaders had considered economic measures against South Africa. Thatcher opposed comprehensive sanctions, arguing that they would harm black South Africans and neighbouring countries without ending apartheid.

At Vancouver, Thatcher refused to endorse five proposals supported by other Commonwealth governments, including arrangements to monitor existing restrictions. Britain nevertheless joined the condemnation of apartheid and reaffirmed its existing commitments.

The Okanagan Statement on Southern Africa and Programme of Action proposed examining South Africa's relationship with the international financial system and establishing a committee of Commonwealth foreign ministers. It also called for assistance to black South Africans and the neighbouring Frontline States.

In a statement to the British House of Commons on 22 October, Thatcher maintained that the outcome did not substantially alter the position reached at Nassau and London.

== Fiji ==
Fiji experienced two military coups in 1987, the second on 25 September. The country was declared a republic in October, and Governor-General Penaia Ganilau resigned during the Vancouver summit.

Commonwealth leaders acknowledged that Fiji's membership had lapsed following the establishment of the republic. They expressed regret over developments in Fiji and called for a resolution of the country's political difficulties.

== World trade ==
The Vancouver Declaration on World Trade expressed concern about increasing protectionism and supported the Uruguay Round of negotiations under the General Agreement on Tariffs and Trade (GATT), which had begun in 1986.

The declaration called for reductions in trade-distorting agricultural policies, improvements to the international trading system and greater consideration of developing countries' interests in trade negotiations.
