= Eminent Persons Group =

An Eminent Persons Group is a group of prominent individuals appointed by an organisation to investigate a particular issue.

== Examples include ==
- ASEAN Eminent Persons Group, Association of Southeast Asian Nations (ASEAN) member countries
- Commonwealth Eminent Persons Group, founded by Commonwealth of Nations
- International Independent Group of Eminent Persons, Sri Lanka

== See also ==
- EPG (disambiguation)
