= EPG (disambiguation) =

EPG is an electronic program guide, an on-screen guide of scheduled broadcast programming television programs.

EPG may also stand for:

- Eggs per gram, a parasitology test
- Electrical penetration graph
- Electropalatography
- Eminent Persons Group (disambiguation)
- Engin Principal du Génie, an armoured fighting vehicle of France
- EPG model, a strategic business model
- Epigen, a protein
- Esterified propoxylated glycerol
