= Commonwealth Eminent Persons Group =

Committees formed by the Commonwealth of Nations

Several Eminent Persons Groups, abbreviated to EPG, have been founded by the Commonwealth of Nations.

== 1985 Eminent Persons Group ==
The first EPG was established at the Commonwealth Heads of Government Meeting 1985, held in Nassau. It was tasked to investigate and report on apartheid in South Africa. It reported ahead of the special Commonwealth Heads of Government Meeting 1986, held in London. Former Australian Prime Minister Malcolm Fraser and former Nigerian Head of State Olusegun Obasanjo were appointed as the EPG's Co-Chairmen. The group visited South Africa twice in early 1986, meeting with members of the South African government, as well as Nelson Mandela. During an official visit to South Africa in May 1986 the South African government launched cross-border attacks on supposed ANC bases in Zambia, Zimbabwe and Botswana. As a result the EPG's discussions with the government deteriorated and the EPG initiative was curtailed. On the 12 June 1986 the group published their conclusion that there was "no genuine intention on the part of the South African government to dismantle apartheid". They subsequently recommended economic sanctions against South Africa. The EPG's report on publication sold 55 000 copies in its first week, going on to be translated into multiple languages and read worldwide.

== 2009 Eminent Persons Group ==
The latest EPG was appointed by the 2009 Commonwealth Heads of Government Meeting at Trinidad and Tobago in November 2009 to report at the Commonwealth Heads of Government Meeting 2011 on potential reforms to Commonwealth institutions and governance. The group's mandate is to set out recommendations on how to strengthen the Commonwealth and fulfill its potential in the 21st century. The members of this EPG were:

- Abdullah Ahmad Badawi (Malaysia, Chairperson)
- Patricia Francis (Jamaica)
- Asma Jahangir (Pakistan)
- Samuel Kavuma (Uganda, Commonwealth Youth Caucus)
- Michael Kirby (Australia)
- Graça Machel (Mozambique)
- Sir Malcolm Rifkind (UK)
- Sir Ronald Sanders (Guyana)
- Hugh Segal (Canada)
- Ieremia Tabai (Kiribati)

== See also ==
- Eminent Persons Group (disambiguation)
