= 15th G7 summit =

1989 international leader meeting in France

- The Grande Arche in La Défense at the outskirts of Paris
- Host country: France
- Dates: 14–16 July 1989
- Cities: Puteaux
- Venues: Grande Arche
- Follows: 14th G7 summit
- Precedes: 16th G7 summit

The 15th G7 Summit was held in the business district of La Défense to the west of Paris, France between 14 and 16 July 1989. The venue for the summit meetings was the Grande Arche in Puteaux which was rushed to completion for celebrations marking the bicentennial of the French Revolution and for the world economic summit meeting that was held in the top of the Arche. This event was also called the "Summit of the Arch."

The Group of Seven (G7) was an unofficial forum which brought together the heads of the richest industrialized countries: France, West Germany, Italy, Japan, the United Kingdom, the United States, Canada (since 1976), and the President of the European Commission (starting officially in 1981). The summits were not meant to be linked formally with wider international institutions; and in fact, a mild rebellion against the stiff formality of other international meetings was a part of the genesis of cooperation between France's president Valéry Giscard d'Estaing and West Germany's chancellor Helmut Schmidt as they conceived the first Group of Six (G6) summit in 1975.

== Leaders at the summit ==
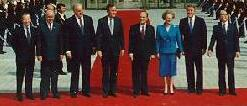
Summit leaders at the Grande Arche: (left to right) Jacques Delors, Ciriaco De Mita, Helmut Kohl, George H. W. Bush, François Mitterrand, Margaret Thatcher, Brian Mulroney, and Sousuke Uno

The G7 is an unofficial annual forum for the leaders of Canada, the European Commission, France, Germany, Italy, Japan, the United Kingdom, and the United States.

The 15th G7 summit was the first summit for US President George H. W. Bush and was the last summit for Italian Prime Minister Ciriaco De Mita. It was also the first and only summit for Japanese Prime Minister Sōsuke Uno.

=== Participants ===
These summit participants are the current "core members" of the international forum:

**Core G7 members** Host state and leader are shown in bold text.
Member		Represented by	Title
(Canada)	Canada	Brian Mulroney	Prime Minister
(France)	**France**	**François Mitterrand**	**President**
(West Germany)	West Germany	Helmut Kohl	Chancellor
(Italy)	Italy	Ciriaco De Mita	Prime Minister
(Japan)	Japan	Sōsuke Uno	Prime Minister
(United Kingdom)	United Kingdom	Margaret Thatcher	Prime Minister
(United States)	United States	George H. W. Bush	President
(European Union)	European Community	Jacques Delors	Commission President
(European Union)	European Community	**François Mitterrand**	Council President

The heads of state and government of over a dozen developing countries were also represented at this summit gathering in Paris.

== Issues ==
The summit was intended as a venue for resolving differences among its members. As a practical matter, the summit was also conceived as an opportunity for its members to give each other mutual encouragement in the face of difficult economic decisions. Issues which were discussed at this summit included:

- International Economic Situation
- International Monetary Developments and Coordination
- Improving Economic Efficiency
- Trade Issues
- General Problems of Development
- The Situation in the Poorest Countries
- Strengthened Debt Strategy for the Heavily Indebted Countries
- Environment
- Drug Issues
- International Cooperation against AIDS

== Gallery of participating leaders ==
=== Core G7 participants ===
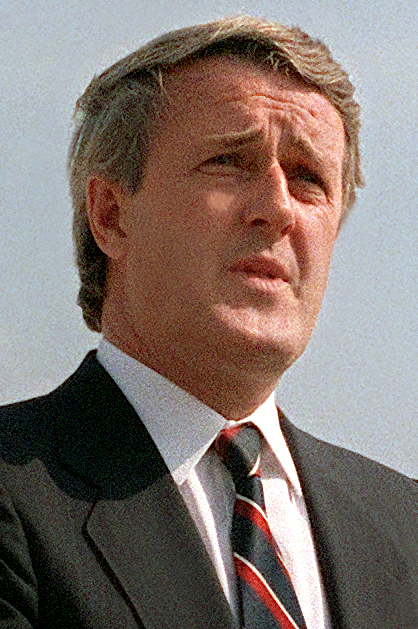
(Canada) Canada
Brian Mulroney,
Prime Minister

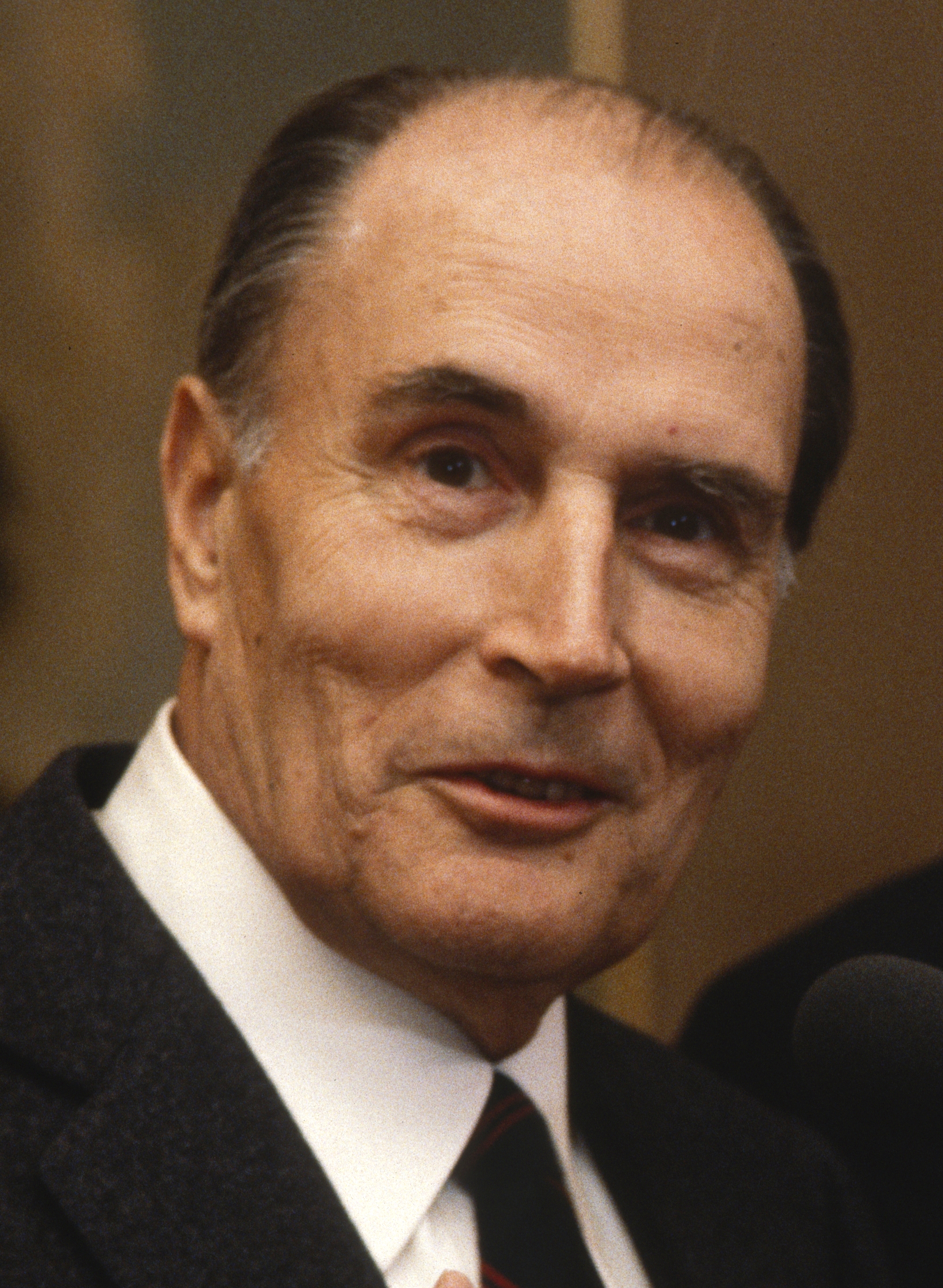
(France) France
François Mitterrand,
President (Host)

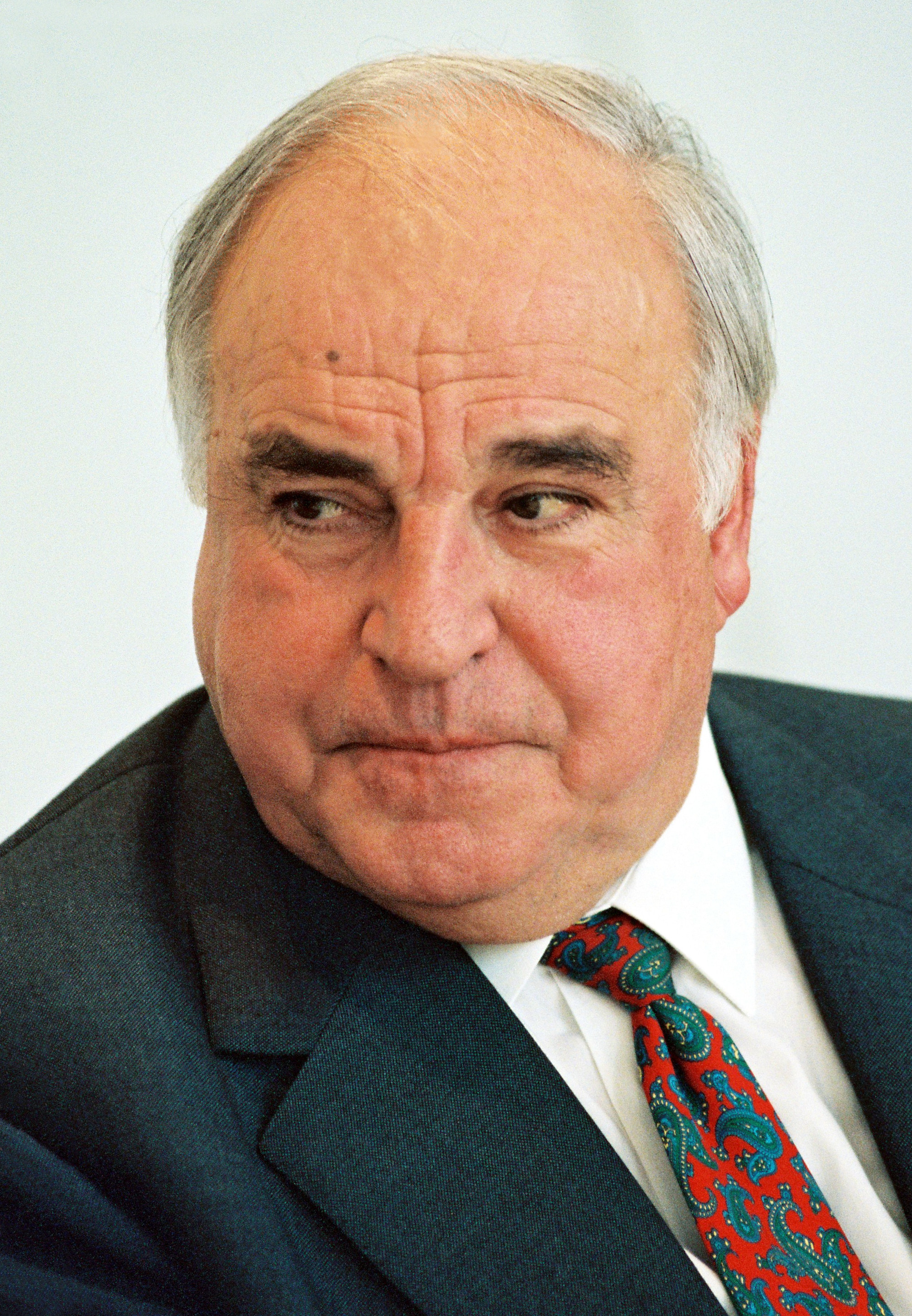
(West Germany) West Germany
Helmut Kohl,
Chancellor

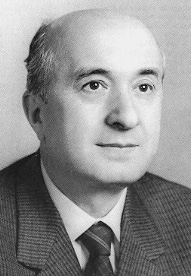
(Italy) Italy
Ciriaco De Mita,
Prime Minister

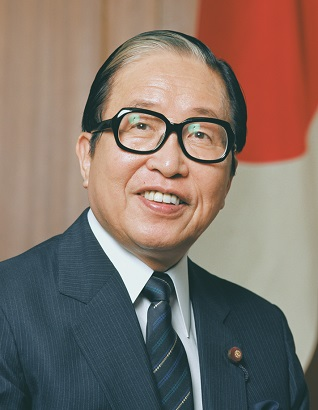
(Japan) Japan
Sōsuke Uno,
Prime Minister

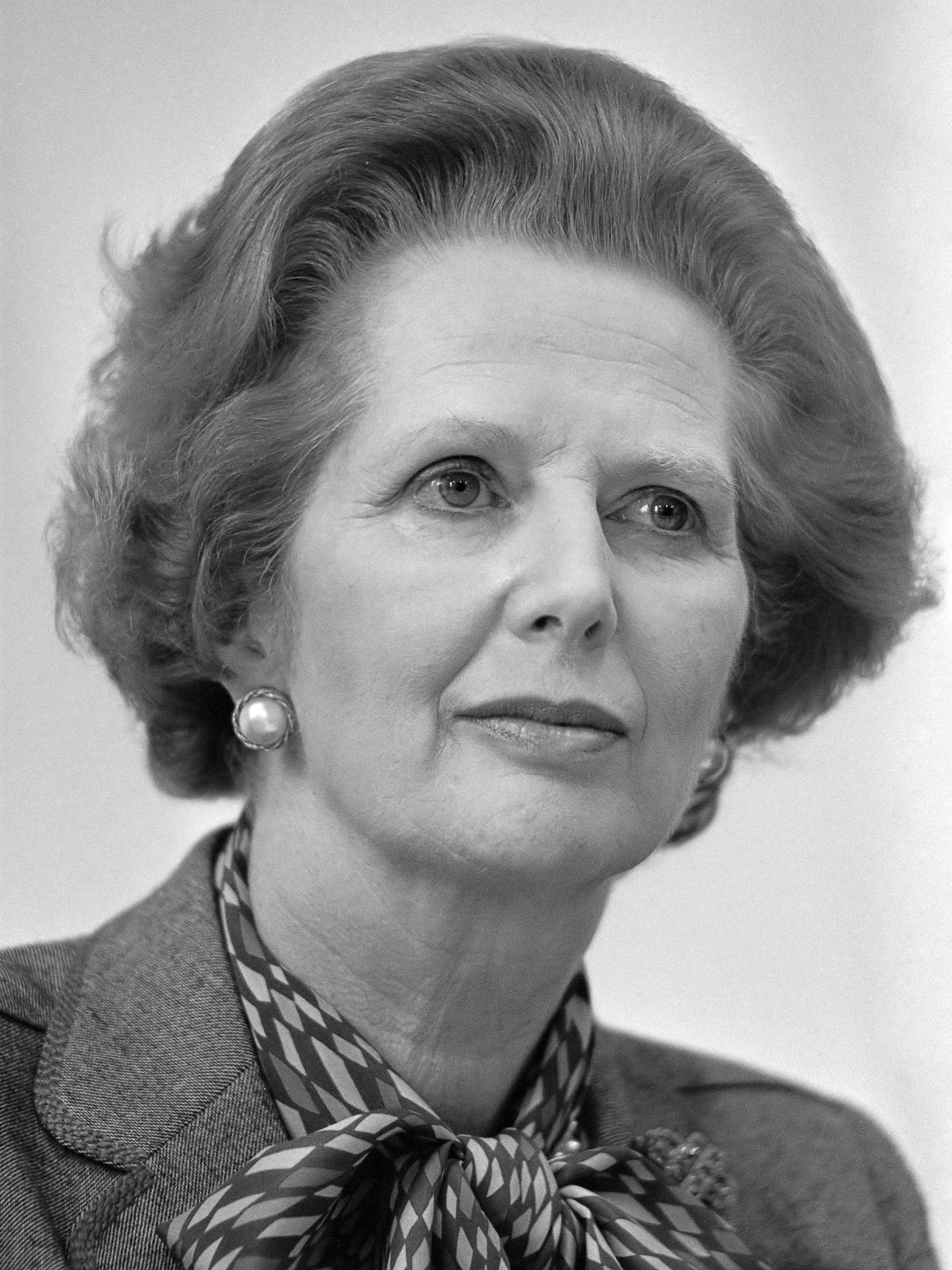
(United Kingdom) United Kingdom
Margaret Thatcher, Prime Minister

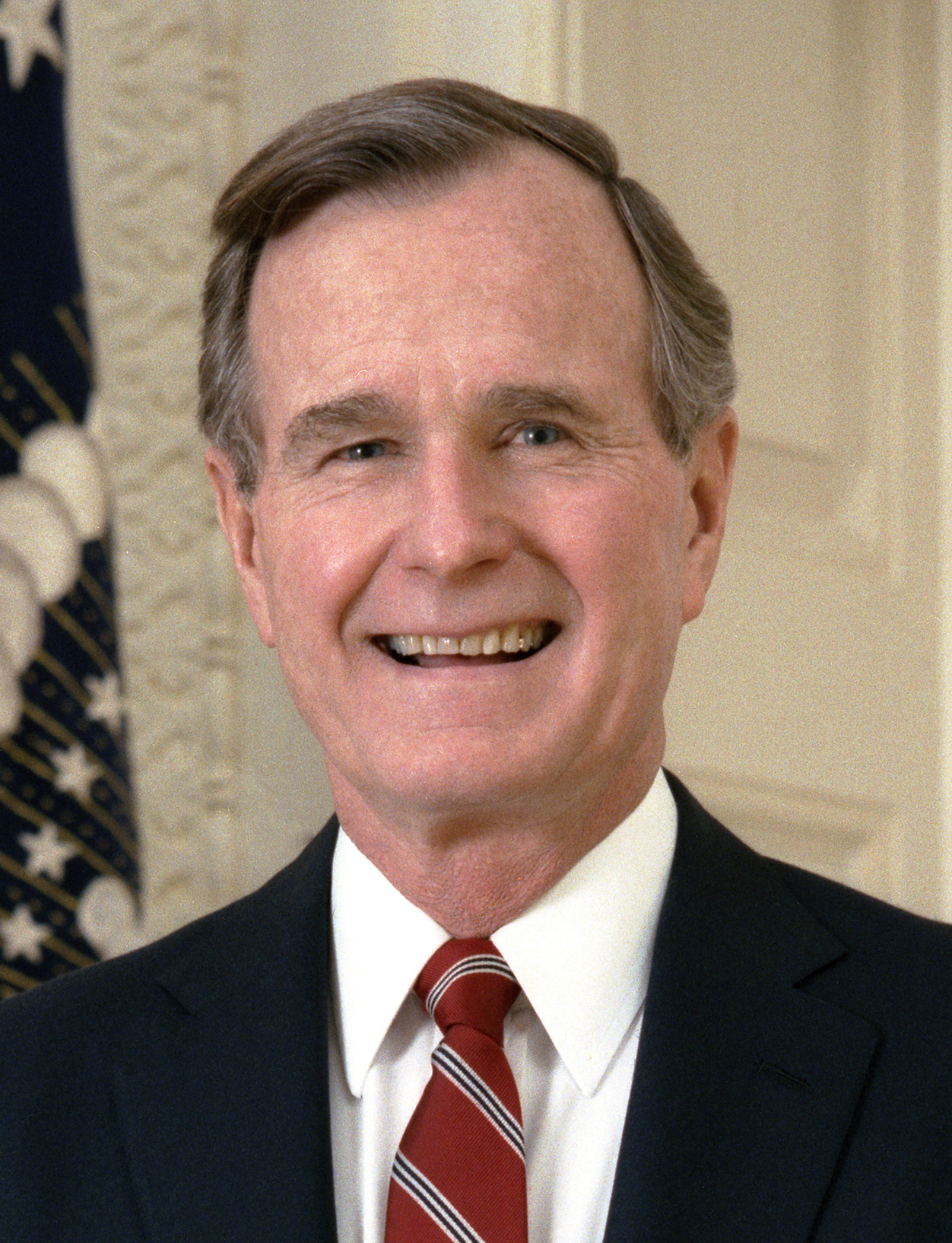
(United States) United States
George H. W. Bush,
President
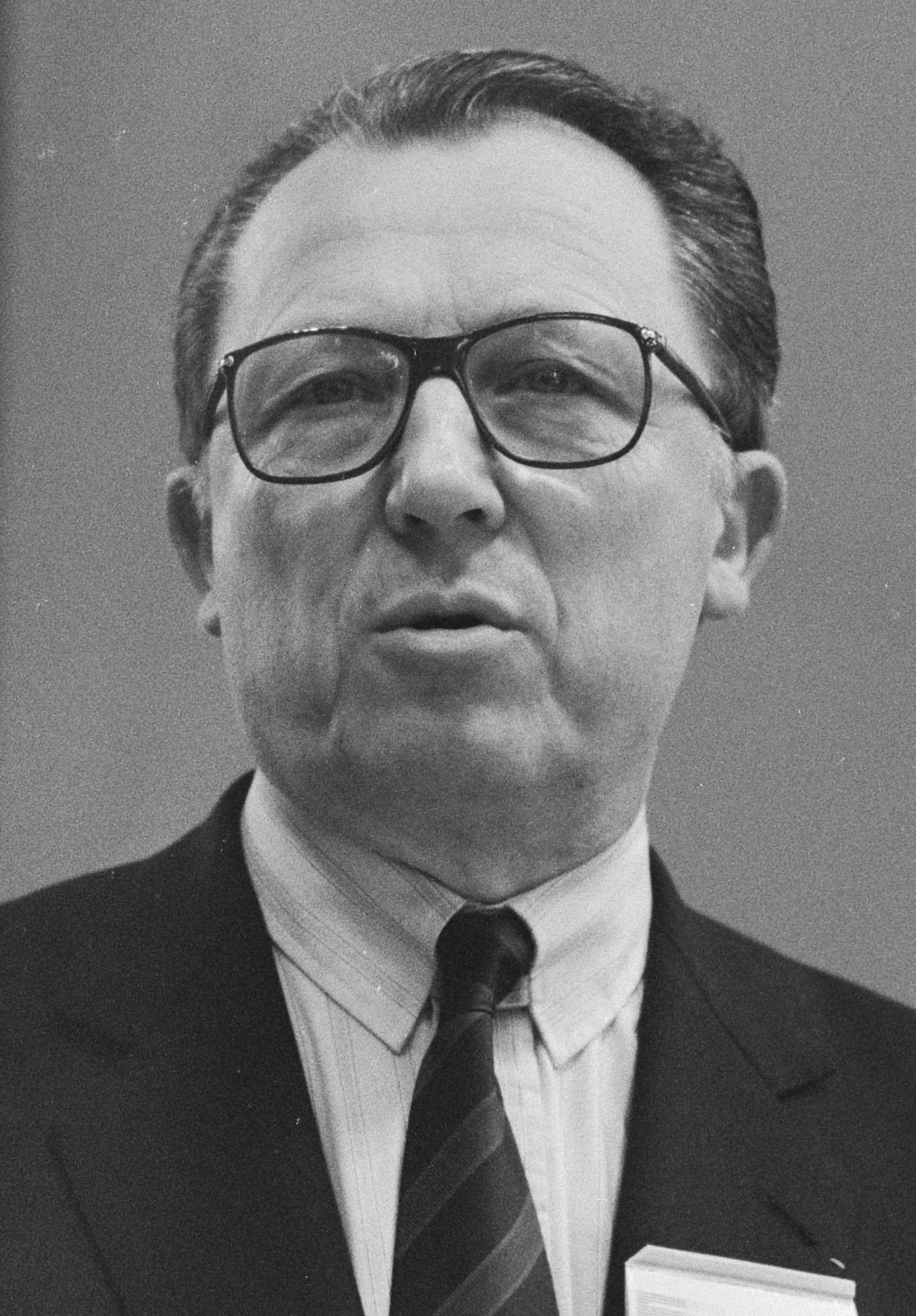
(European Union) European Union
Jacques Delors, Commission President

== Accomplishments ==
While the agenda-setting or parameter-setting functions of the summit are important, the associated action or inaction which comes afterwards is important as well. These remain conceptually distinct aspects of the G7 summits.

A symbol of the mixed legacy of this summit is the Grande Arche itself. The total expenditure on the building reached 3.74 billion francs, all but 5.7 percent of which was covered by private investors, with the state remaining owner of the roof area; and yet, in 2001, parts of the facade were falling off. A Frommer's review in 2010 characterizes it as a "politician's folly."

In 1989, the summit leaders called for "adoption of sustainable forest management practices, with a view to preserving the scale of the world's forests," but there is little evidence of follow-up action.

== See also ==
- G8
