= 16th G7 summit =

1990 international leader meeting in the US

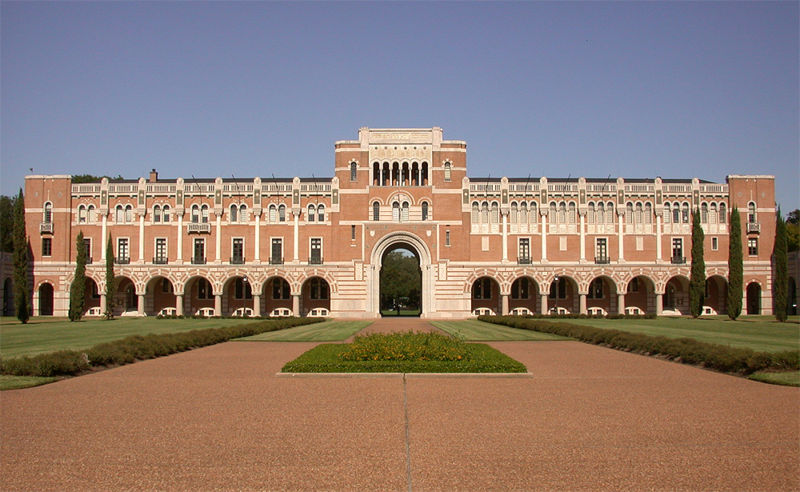
- Lovett Hall at Rice University in Houston
- Host country: United States
- Dates: July 9–11, 1990
- Cities: Houston
- Venues: Rice University; Museum of Fine Arts
- Follows: 15th G7 summit
- Precedes: 17th G7 summit

The 16th G7 Summit was held at Houston between July 9 and 11, 1990. The venue for the summit meetings was the campus of Rice University and other locations nearby in the Houston Museum District.

The Group of Seven (G7) was an unofficial forum which brought together the heads of the richest industrialized countries: France, West Germany, Italy, Japan, the United Kingdom, the United States, Canada (since 1976), and the President of the European Commission (starting officially in 1981). The summits were not meant to be linked formally with wider international institutions; and in fact, a mild rebellion against the stiff formality of other international meetings was a part of the genesis of cooperation between France's president Valéry Giscard d'Estaing and West Germany's chancellor Helmut Schmidt as they conceived the first Group of Six (G6) summit in 1975.

== Leaders at the summit ==
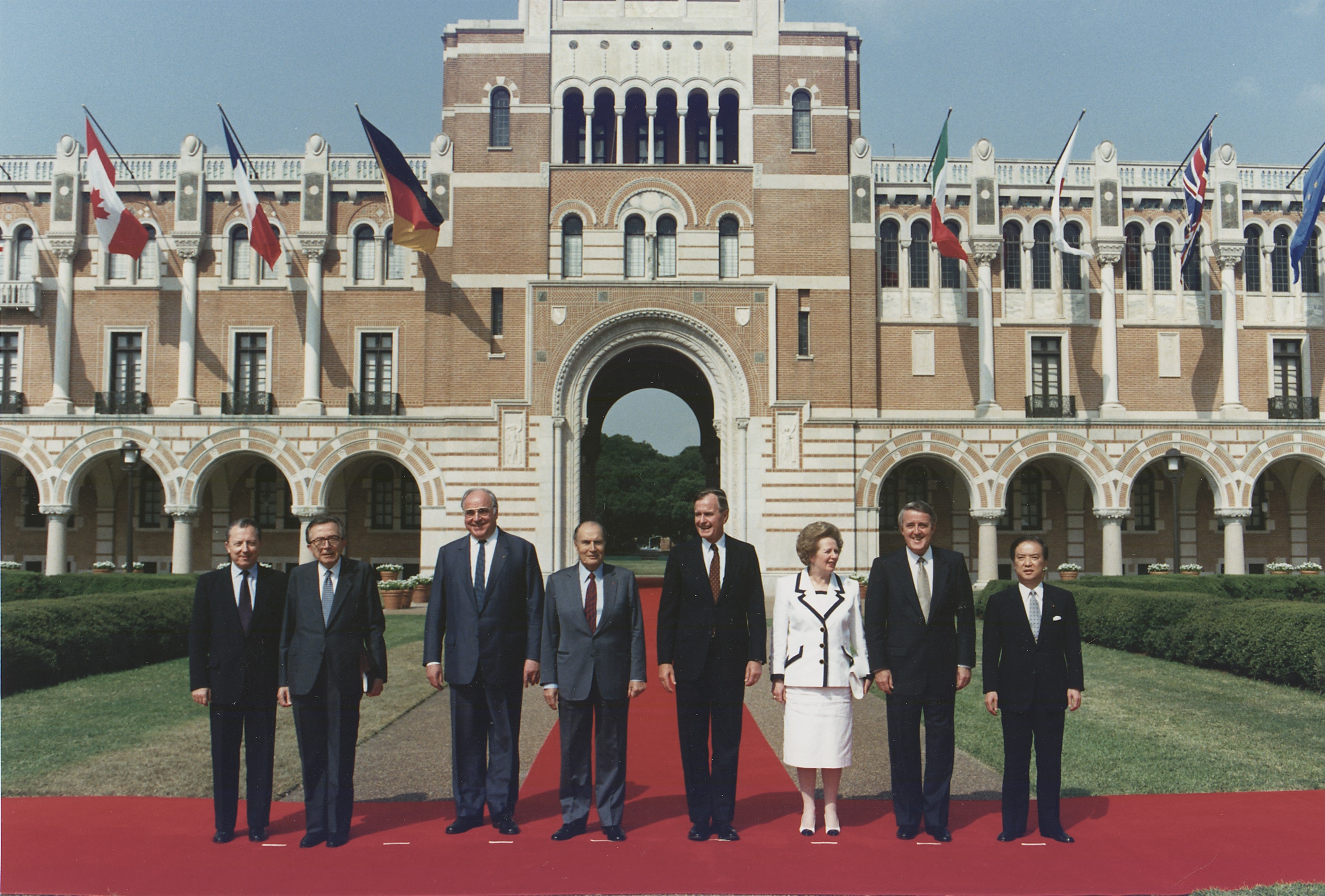
Summit leaders at Lovett Hall: (left to right) Jacques Delors, Giulio Andreotti, Helmut Kohl, François Mitterrand, George H. W. Bush, Margaret Thatcher, Brian Mulroney, and Toshiki Kaifu

The G7 is an unofficial annual forum for the leaders of Canada, the European Commission, France, Germany, Italy, Japan, the United Kingdom, and the United States.

The 16th G7 summit was the first for Japanese Prime Minister Toshiki Kaifu. It was also the last summit for British Prime Minister Margaret Thatcher.

=== Participants ===
These summit participants are the current "core members" of the international forum:

**Core G7 members** Host state and leader are shown in bold text.
Member		Represented by	Title
(Canada)	Canada	Brian Mulroney	Prime Minister
(France)	France	François Mitterrand	President
(West Germany)	West Germany	Helmut Kohl	Chancellor
(Italy)	Italy	Giulio Andreotti	Prime Minister
(Japan)	Japan	Toshiki Kaifu	Prime Minister
(United Kingdom)	United Kingdom	Margaret Thatcher	Prime Minister
(United States)	**United States**	**George H. W. Bush**	**President**
(European Union)	European Community	Jacques Delors	Commission President
(European Union)	European Community	Giulio Andreotti	Council President

== Agenda ==
=== July 9 ===
President George H.W. Bush unofficially opened the summit the night before the first official round of meetings was scheduled. He hosted a rodeo and barbecue with "armadillo races, bull riding, barrel racing, calf scrambling, the Grand Ole Opry, an Old West village, cowboys and Indians, oil rigs, square dancing, a sheriff with silver spurs, Styrofoam cacti, a model of the space shuttle, horseshoe contests, 1,250 gallons of barbecue sauce and jalapenos, 500 pounds of onions, 5,000 servings of cobbler and carrot cake, and 650 gallons of lemonade and iced tea."

=== July 10 ===
The official opening ceremonies were held outside in the Academic Quadrangle at Rice University. The leaders stood on a specially built platform with air conditioners built into the floor which only afforded a measure of relief as temperatures rose to near 100 degrees. This platform was located in front of Lovett Hall, a Romanesque revival administration building designed by Ralph Adams Cram and built in 1912.

At the close of initial speeches by each leader, the group moved inside, into the building's Founders Room, for their first working session in the building's "Founders Room." The talks lasted about two hours.

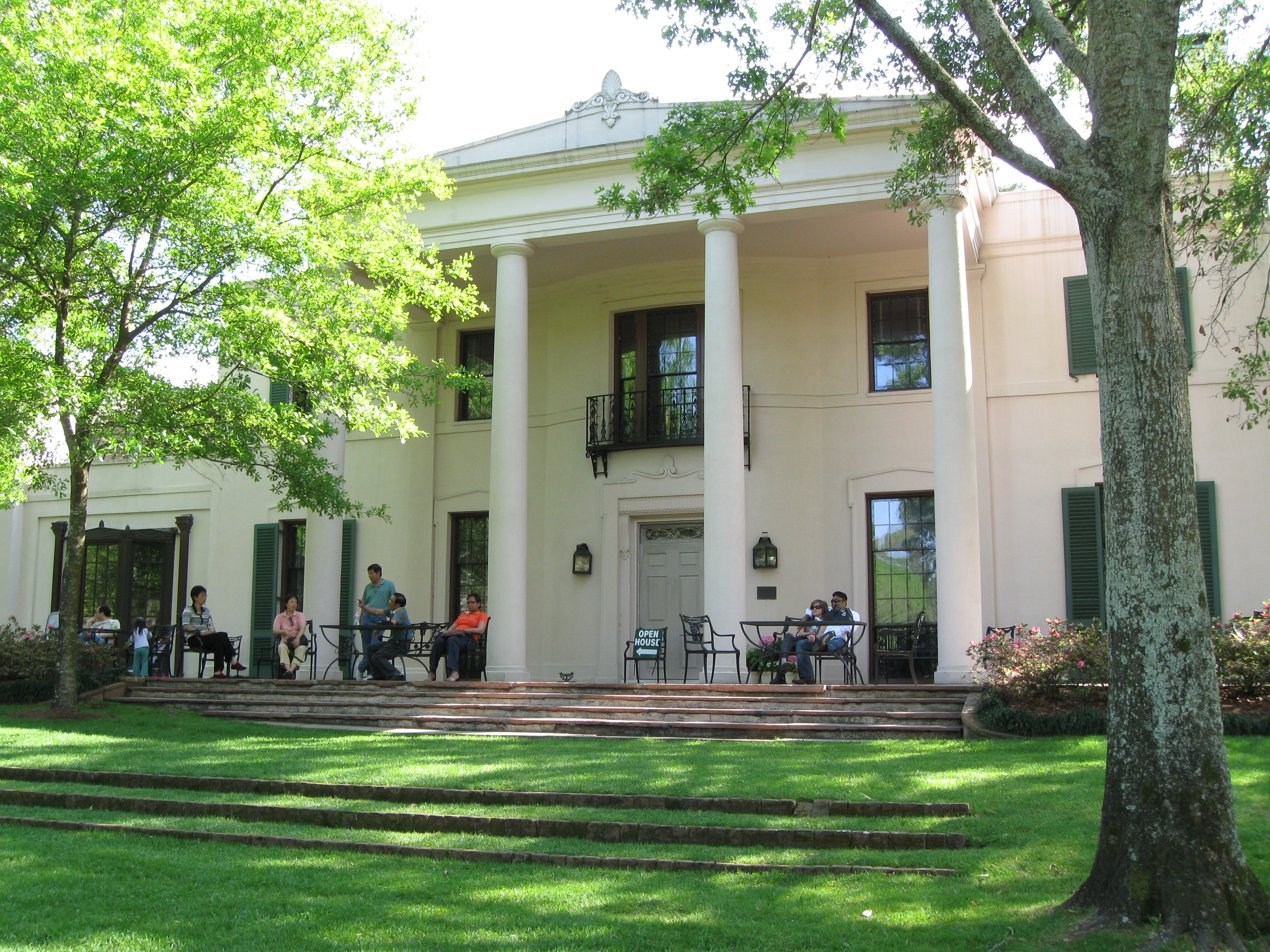
The first day events were capped off with a working dinner at "Bayou Bend."

A working dinner at Bayou Bend, once the home of a philanthropist, Ima Hogg, and now a museum of American decorative arts was scheduled. The food, including tortilla soup and grilled red snapper with basil lime sauce, was prepared by three of the premier chefs in Texas.

=== July 11 ===
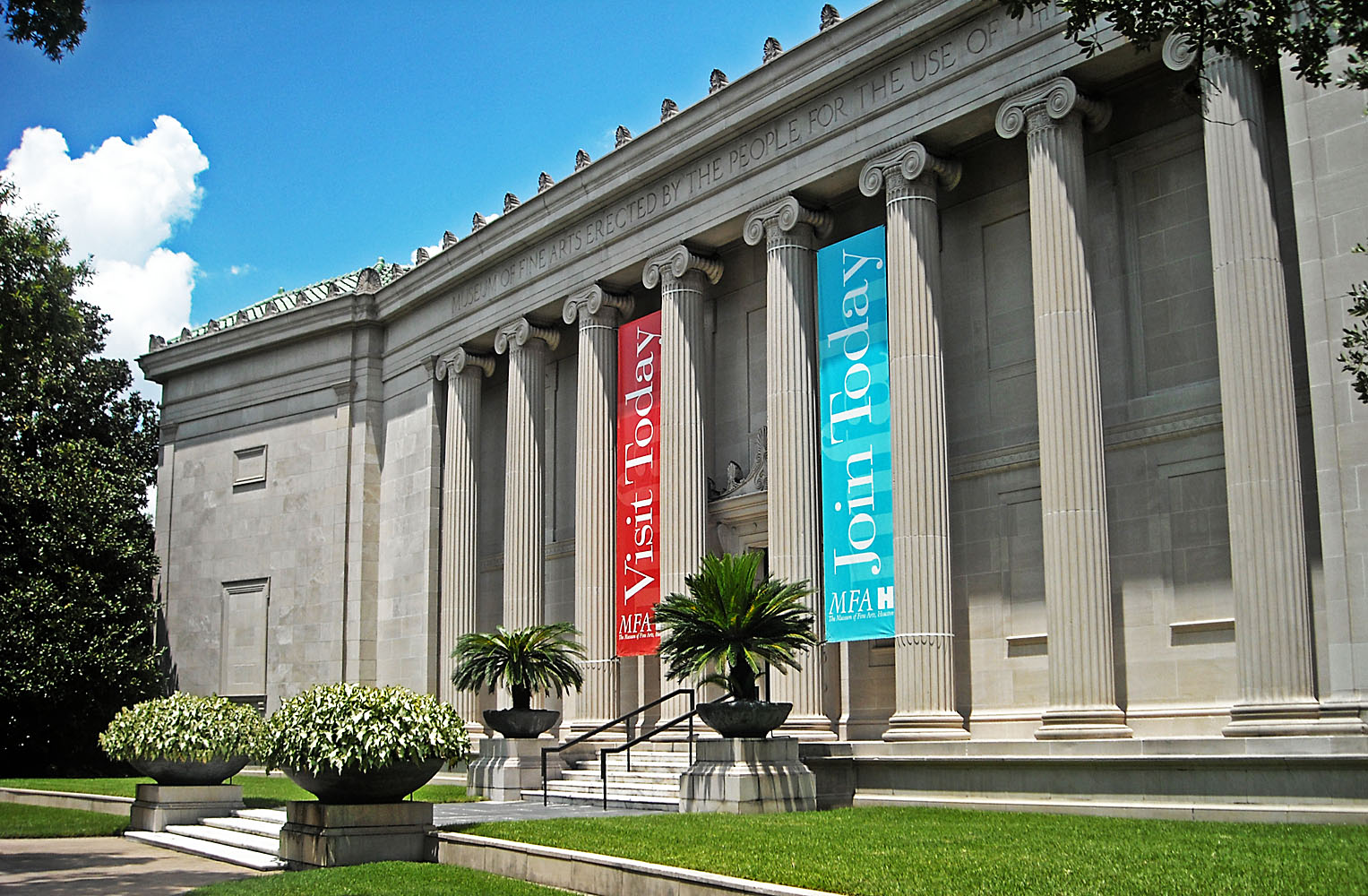
The second day events included a dinner at Houston's Museum of Fine Arts.

In addition to their talks about significant international problems, the world leaders set aside some time to dine together in a formal affair which took place in Houston's Museum of Fine Arts (MFAH).

=== Issues ===
Each leader attending the economic summit has a slightly different perspective about the priorities which need to be addressed by the group working together

The summit was intended as a venue for resolving differences among its members. As a practical matter, the summit was also conceived as an opportunity for its members to give each other mutual encouragement in the face of difficult economic decisions. Issues which were discussed at this summit included:

- The International Economic Situation
- International Monetary Developments and Policy
- The International Trading System
- Direct Investment
- Export Credits
- Reform in Central and Eastern Europe
- The Soviet Union
- The Developing Nations
- Third World Debt
- The Environment
- Narcotics

== Accomplishments ==
In 1990, as in 1989, the summit leaders proclaimed the necessity to fight climate change, restore the Ozone layer, protect the biodiversity and restore forests. http://www.g7.utoronto.ca/summit/1990houston/declaration.html#environment

== Budget ==
Houston spent nearly $20 million on civic beautification projects in advance of the summit.

== Involving the local community ==
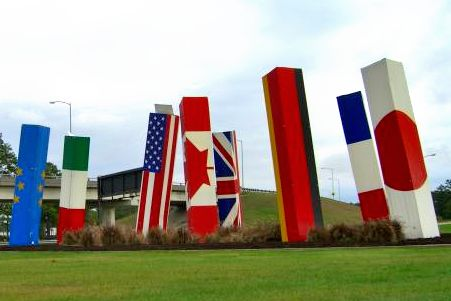
The sculpture in its current location near the entrance to George Bush Intercontinental Airport

Disgraced Enron Chief Executive and Chairman of the Board Kenneth Lay was the co-chairman of the organizing committee for economic summit for G-7 nations.

=== Art Installation ===
A large sculpture was commissioned by Bush for the event. It ultimately consisted of several rectangular light pillars with the designs of the flags of the seven participating countries (plus the flag of Europe). After the summit, the sculpture was relocated to Houston Intercontinental Airport, which was renamed in honor of the former President some years later.

== Gallery of participating leaders ==
=== Core G7 participants ===
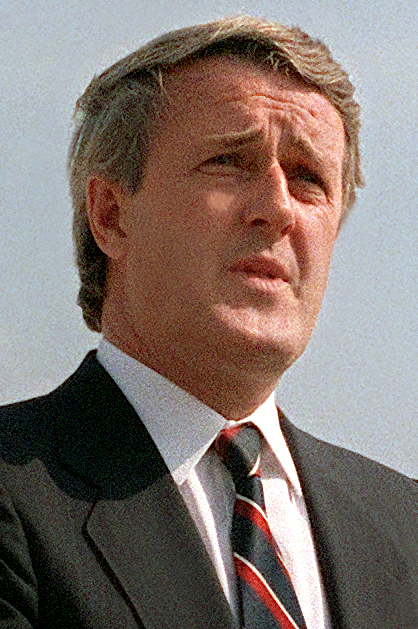
(Canada) Canada
Brian Mulroney,
Prime Minister

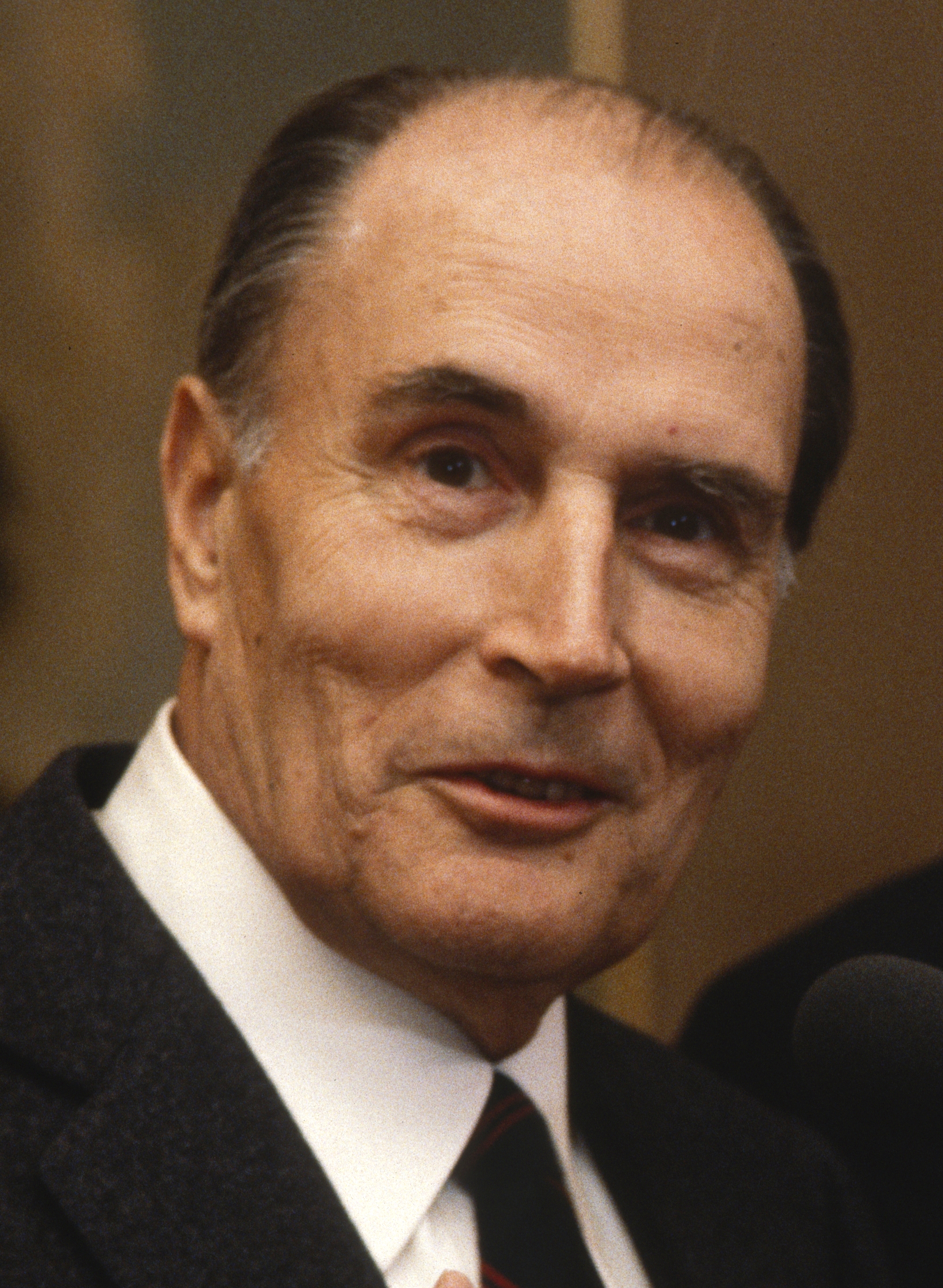
(France) France
François Mitterrand,
President

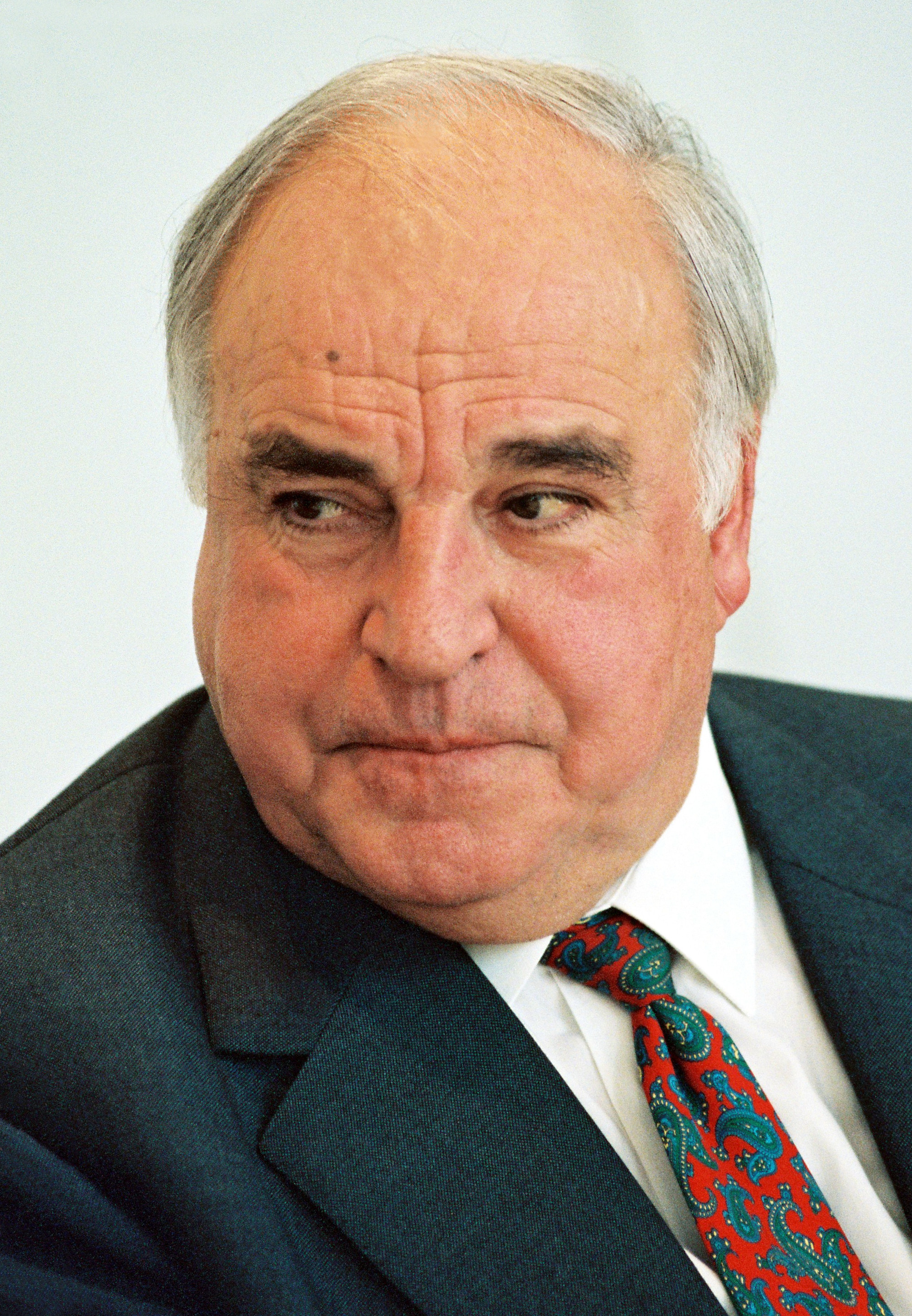
(West Germany) West Germany
Helmut Kohl,
Chancellor

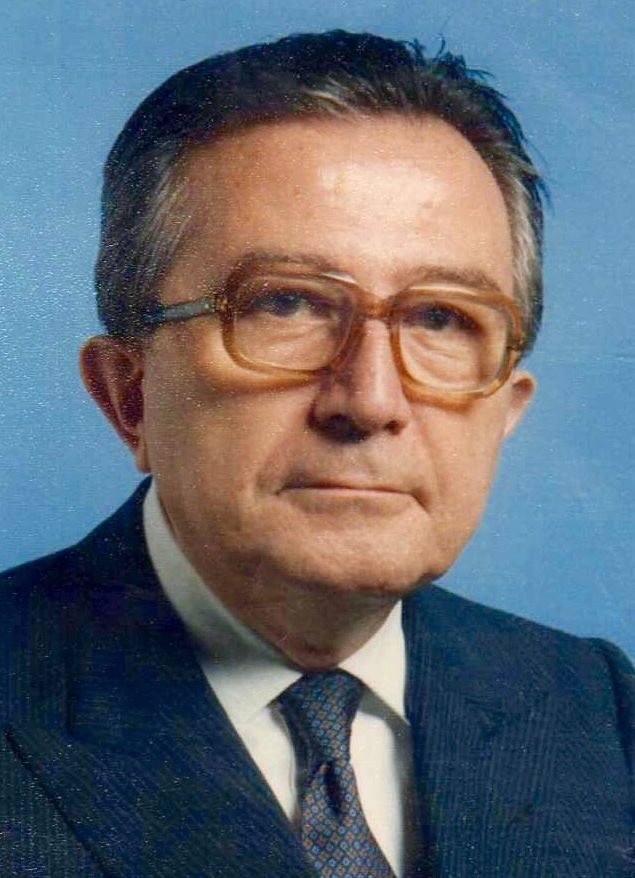
(Italy) Italy
Giulio Andreotti,
Prime Minister

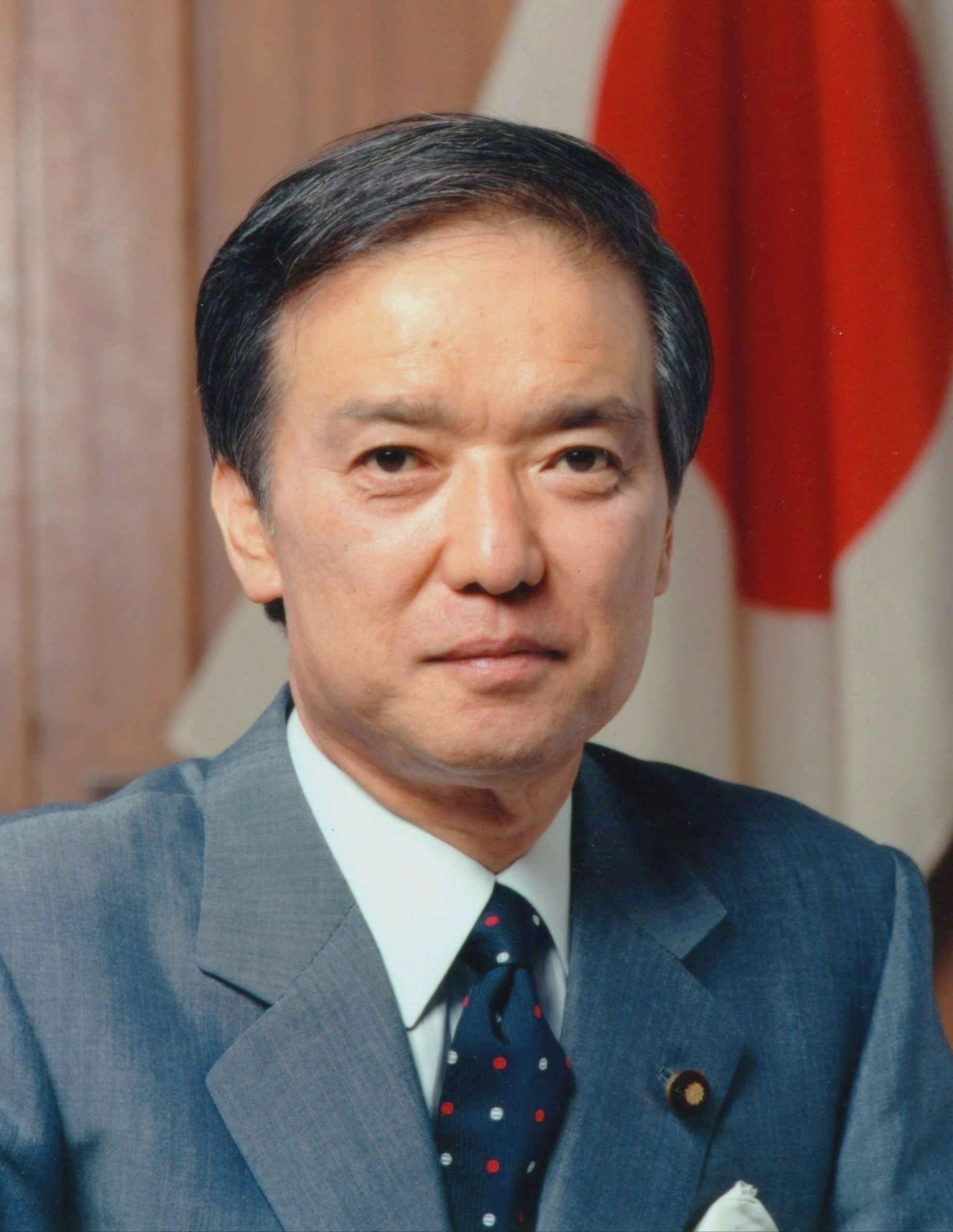
(Japan) Japan
Toshiki Kaifu,
Prime Minister

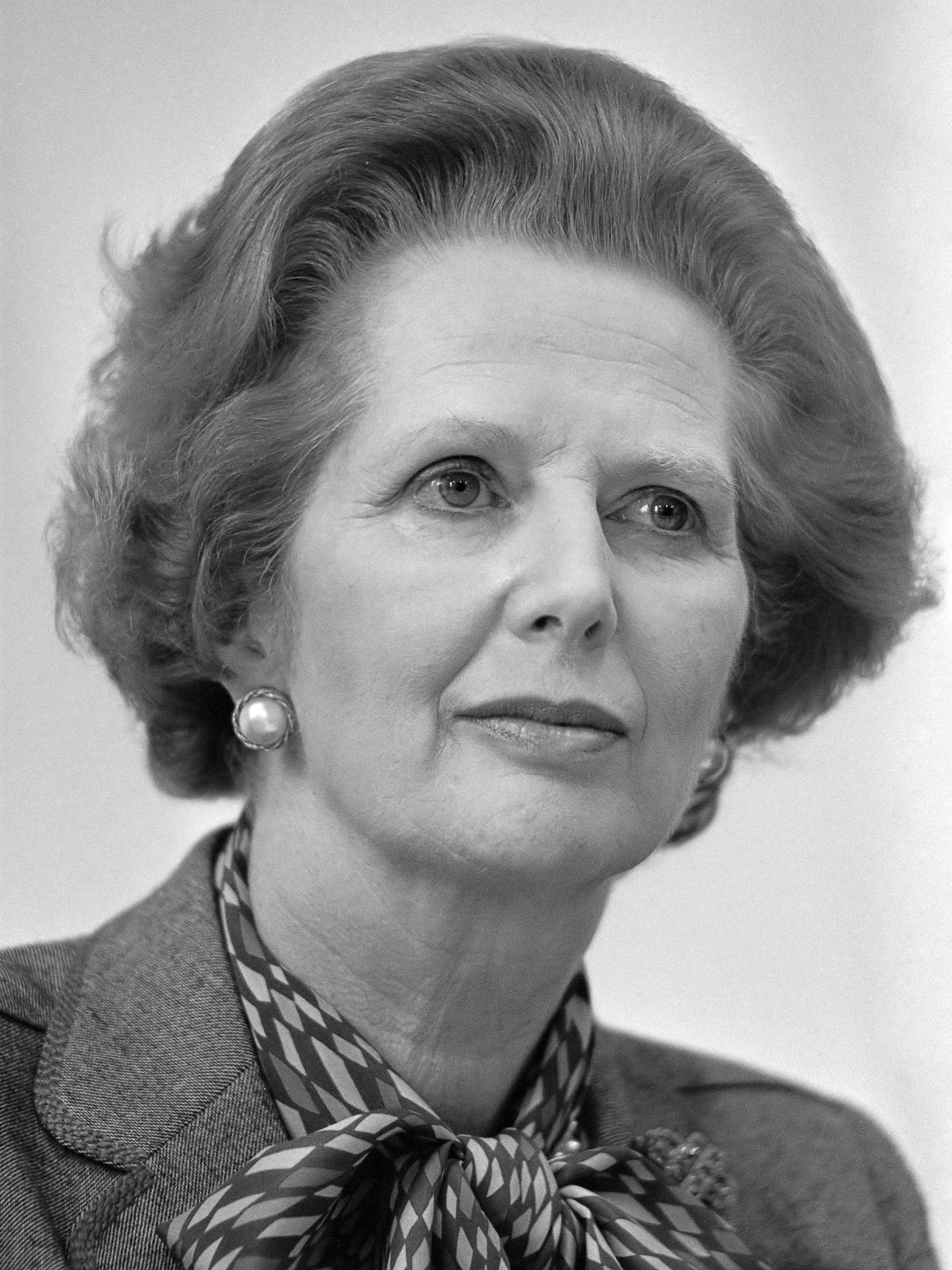
(United Kingdom) United Kingdom
Margaret Thatcher,
Prime Minister

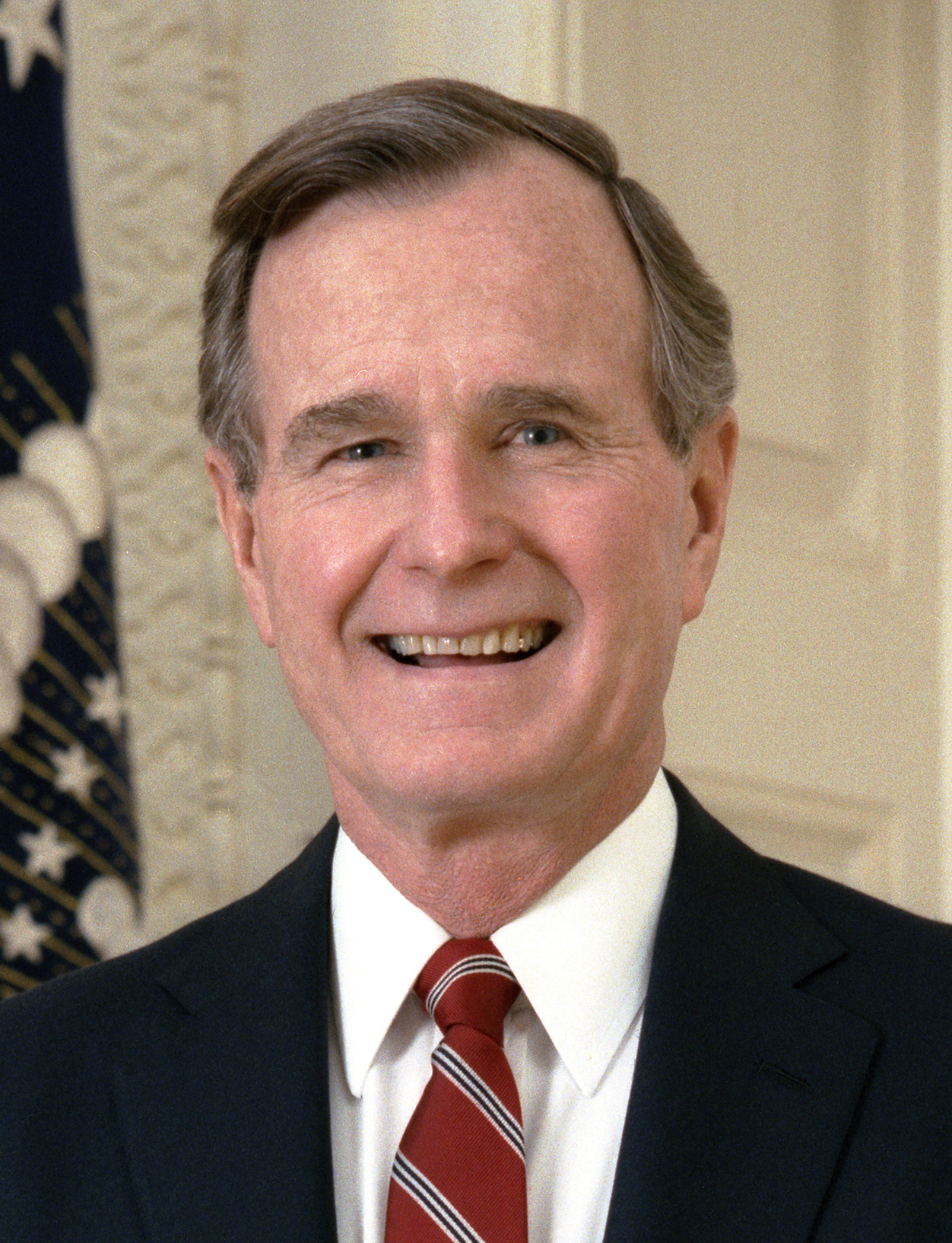
(United States) United States
George H. W. Bush,
President (Host)
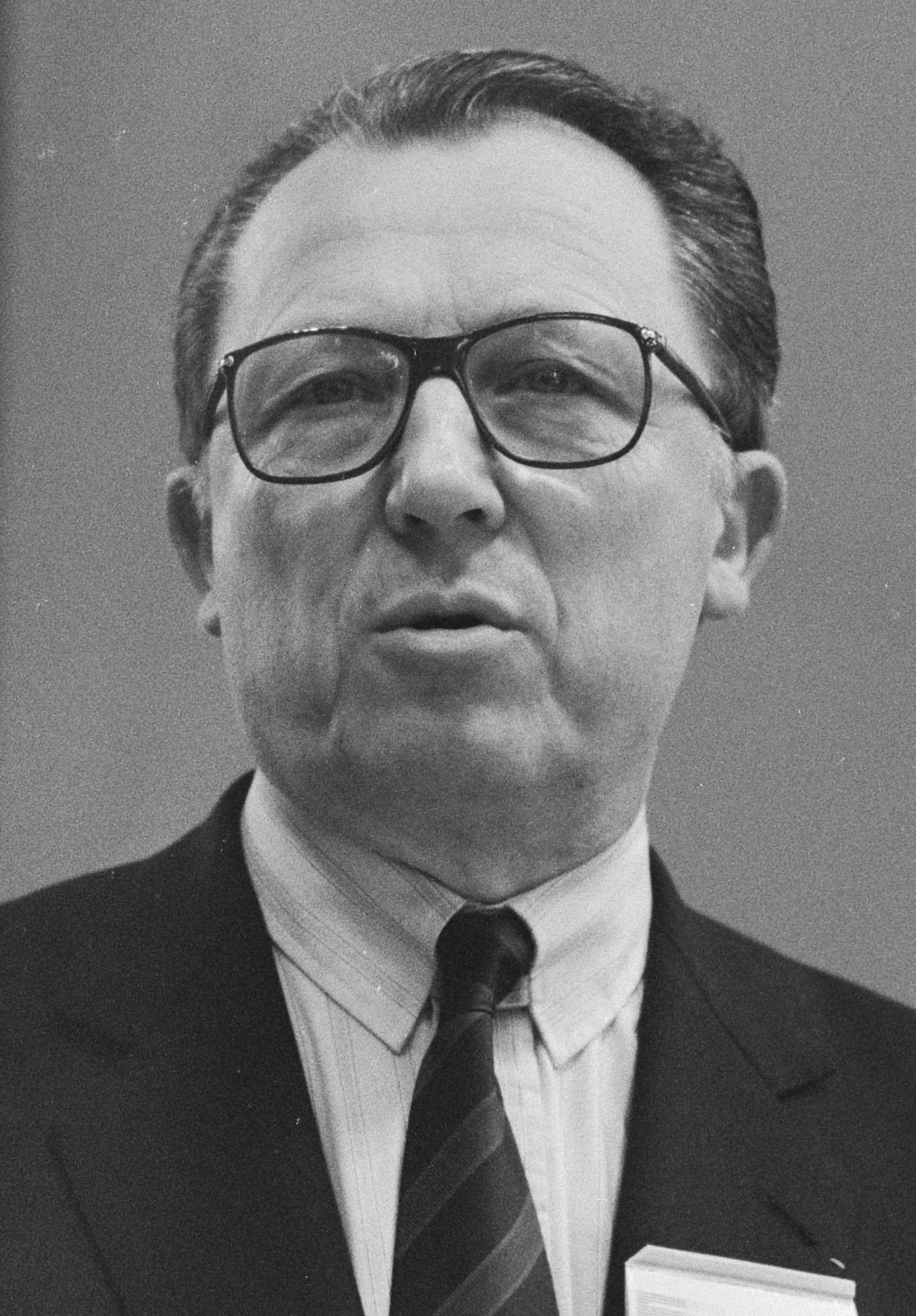
(European Union) European Union
Jacques Delors,
Commission President

== See also ==
- G8
