= 1986 Commonwealth Heads of Government Meeting =

Government meeting

9th Commonwealth Heads of Government Meeting
- Host country: United Kingdom
- Dates: 3 August 1986– 5 August 1986
- Cities: London
- Participants: 7
- Heads of State or Government: 7
- Chair: Margaret Thatcher (Prime Minister)
- Follows: 1985
- Precedes: 1987

Key points
- Sanctions against and divestment from South Africa

The 1986 Commonwealth Heads of Government Meeting was the ninth Meeting of the Heads of Government of the Commonwealth of Nations. It was held in London, the United Kingdom, between 3–5 August 1986, and was hosted by British Prime Minister Margaret Thatcher.

It was a special meeting held between the biennial Commonwealth meetings to consider the recommendations of the Commonwealth Eminent Persons Group regarding economic sanctions against South Africa due to its policies of apartheid. Margaret Thatcher's refusal to support mandatory sanctions resulted in an acrimonious meeting and almost led to a split in the Commonwealth.

== Participants ==
The following nations were represented:

Nation	Name	Position
United Kingdom	Margaret Thatcher	Prime Minister
Australia	Robert Hawke	Prime Minister
Bahamas	Lynden Pindling	Prime Minister
Canada	Brian Mulroney	Prime Minister
India	Rajiv Gandhi	Prime Minister
Zambia	Kenneth Kaunda	President
Zimbabwe	Robert Mugabe	Prime Minister
