= 1985 Commonwealth Heads of Government Meeting =

8th meeting of the Commonwealth Heads of Government

8th Commonwealth Heads of Government Meeting
- Host country: The Bahamas
- Dates: 16–22 October 1985
- Cities: Nassau
- Venues: Lyford Cay
- Participants: 46
- Heads of State or Government: 41
- Chair: Sir Lynden Pindling (Prime Minister)
- Follows: 1983
- Precedes: 1986

Key points
- Apartheid

The 1985 Commonwealth Heads of Government Meeting was the eighth Meeting of the Heads of Government of the Commonwealth of Nations. It was held in Nassau, the Bahamas, between 16 and 22 October 1985, and was hosted by Bahamian Prime Minister, Sir Lynden Pindling. 46 Commonwealth countries participated, with 41 heads of state or government represented.

The Nassau Accord was agreed to calling on the government of South Africa to dismantle its apartheid policy, enter into negotiations with the country's black majority and end its occupation of Namibia. The Commonwealth Eminent Persons Group was appointed to investigate the South African issue and report back with recommendations ahead of the special 1986 meeting in London.

Once released from prison, Nelson Mandela visited the Bahamas and thanked Sir Lynden Pindling for his role in opposing apartheid. Thabo Mbeki also visited the Bahamas when he became president of South Africa.

== Attendees ==
The following heads of delegation attended the 1985 Commonwealth Heads of Government Meeting in Nassau, Bahamas.

Country	Representative	Position
Antigua and Barbuda	Vere Cornwall Bird	Prime Minister
Australia	Bob Hawke	Prime Minister
Bahamas	Lynden Pindling (Chair-in-Office)	Prime Minister
Bangladesh	Hussain Muhammad Ershad	President
Barbados	Bernard St. John	Prime Minister
Belize	Manuel Esquivel	Prime Minister
Botswana	Quett Masire	President
United Kingdom	Margaret Thatcher	Prime Minister
Brunei	Hassanal Bolkiah	Sultan and Prime Minister
Canada	Brian Mulroney	Prime Minister
Cyprus	Spyros Kyprianou	President
Dominica	Eugenia Charles	Prime Minister
Fiji	Kamisese Mara	Prime Minister
Gambia	Dawda Jawara	President
Ghana	D. F. Annan	Vice-Chairman of the Provisional National Defence Council
Grenada	Herbert Blaize	Prime Minister
Guyana	Desmond Hoyte	President
India	Rajiv Gandhi	Prime Minister
Jamaica	Edward Seaga	Prime Minister
Kenya	Mwai Kibaki	Vice-President
Kiribati	Ieremia Tabai	President
Lesotho	Moshoeshoe II	King
Malawi	E. C. I. Bwanali	Minister of Finance
Malaysia	Mahathir Mohamad	Prime Minister
Maldives	Maumoon Abdul Gayoom	President
Mauritius	Anerood Jugnauth	Prime Minister
New Zealand	David Lange	Prime Minister
Nigeria	Ebitu Ukiwe	Chief of General Staff
Papua New Guinea	Michael Somare	Prime Minister
Saint Kitts and Nevis	Kennedy Simmonds	Prime Minister
Saint Lucia	John Compton	Prime Minister
Saint Vincent and the Grenadines	James Fitz-Allen Mitchell	Prime Minister
Seychelles	France-Albert René	President
Sierra Leone	Siaka Stevens	President
Singapore	Lee Kuan Yew	Prime Minister
Solomon Islands	Peter Kenilorea	Prime Minister
Sri Lanka	J. R. Jayewardene	President
Swaziland	Bhekimpi Dlamini	Prime Minister
Tanzania	Salim Ahmed Salim	Prime Minister
Tonga	Tupoutoʻa	Minister of Foreign Affairs and Defence
Trinidad and Tobago	George Chambers	Prime Minister
Uganda	Abraham Waligo	Prime Minister
Vanuatu	Walter Lini	Prime Minister
Zambia	Kenneth Kaunda	President
Commonwealth	Shridath Ramphal	Secretary-General
